= Sainte Marie Majeure =

Sainte Marie Majeure (French: Saint Mary Major) or variant, may refer to:

== Churches ==
- Cathédrale Sainte-Marie-Majeure de Marseille, France (French: Cathedral of Saint Mary Major of Marseilles)
- Église Sainte-Marie-Majeure de Bonifacio, Corsica, France (French: Church of Saint Mary Major of Bonifacio)
- Toulon Cathedral, Toulon, France; a.k.a. Sainte-Marie-Majeure
- Église Notre-Dame la Grande, Poitiers, France (French: Church of Our Lady the Great, lit. 'Saint Mary the Great Church') a Catholic church also called Latin: Sancta Maria Maior, lit. 'Saint Mary Major' in French "Sainte Marie Majeure"

== Other uses ==
- Sainte-Marie-Majeure Seminary, Strasbourg, France
- Abbaye Sainte-Marie-Majeure de Pont-à-Mousson (French: Abbey of Saint Mary Major of Pont-a-Mousson); see List of Premonstratensian monasteries in France

== See also ==
- Sainte-Marie (disambiguation)
- Saint Mary of the Snows (disambiguation)
- Notre Dame des Neiges (disambiguation)
- Santa Maria Maggiore (disambiguation) (Italian: Saint Mary Major)
- Santa María la Mayor (disambiguation) (Spanish: Saint Mary Major)
- Santa Maria Maior (disambiguation) (Portuguese: Saint Mary Major)
- Saint Mary Major (disambiguation)
