= Labro =

Labro may refer to:

== People ==
- Maurice Labro (1910–1987), French film director
- Philippe Labro (1936–2025), French author, journalist and film director

== Places ==
- Labro, Etruscan name of Livorno
- Labro, Lazio, Italy
- Labro Meadows Nature Reserve, Sweden
