= Mary Grand =

Mary, Marie, Maria named Grand, Grande, Great, may refer to:

== People ==
- Mary the Great, Grand Saint Mary, other terms for Mary, mother of Jesus
- Margaret Nolan (1943–2020), British actress who used the stagename 'Marie Legrand' (Mary the Grand)
- Marie Legrand (politician), a French politician who ran in 2007 in Vienne's 1st constituency
- María la Grande (1789–1844), South American indigenous leader
- María Grand (born 1992), Swiss musician

== Places ==
- Church of St Mary the Great, Cambridge, England, UK
- Église Notre-Dame la Grande, Poitiers, France; (French: Great St-Mary Church, lit. 'the Church of Our Lady the Great')
- Mary Grand High School, Pakistan
- Convent of St. Mary the Great, of the Hospitaller Order; see History of the Knights Hospitaller in the Levant
- María Grande, Entre Rios, Argentina; a village

== Other uses ==
- Große Maria (German: Great Mary), a church bell from Bell, Rhein-Hunsrück, Germany

== See also ==
- Mary (disambiguation)
- Saint Mary (disambiguation)
- Saint Mary Major (disambiguation) (another way to write Great Saint Mary)
