= Santa Maria Maggiore (disambiguation) =

Santa Maria Maggiore is a church in Rome.

Santa Maria Maggiore (Italian: Saint Mary Major) may also refer to:

== Churches ==
- Santa Maria Maggiore, Alatri, Lazio
- Santa Maria Maggiore, Assisi, Umbria
- Barletta Cathedral, Apulia
- Santa Maria Maggiore, Bergamo, Lombrady
- Santa Maria Maggiore, Bologna, Emilia-Romagna
- Santa Maria Maggiore, Casacalenda, Abruzzo
- Church of Santa Maria Maggiore (Cerveteri), Lazio
- Santa Maria Maggiore, Florence, Tuscany
- Santa Maria Maggiore, Gazzo Veronese, Veneto
- Santa Maria Maggiore, Guardiagrele, Abruzzo
- Santa Maria Maggiore, Labro, Lazio
- Santa Maria Maggiore, Lanciano, Abruzzo
- Santa Maria Maggiore, Lomello, Lombardy
- Santa Maria Maggiore, Miglionico, Basilicata
- Basilica vetus, former cathedral of Santa Maria Maggiore in Milan, Lombardy
- Santa Maria Maggiore, Mineo, Sicily
- Santa Maria Maggiore, Mirandola, Emilia-Romgna
- Santa Maria Maggiore della Pietrasanta, Naples, Campania
- Santa Maria Maggiore, Nicosia, Sicily
- Santa Maria Maggiore, Racconigi, Piedmont
- Basilica of Santa Maria Maggiore di Siponto, Apulia
- Santa Maria Maggiore, Trento, Trentino-Alto Adige/Südtirol
- Santa Maria Maggiore, Trieste, Friuli-Venezia Giulia
- Santa Maria Maggiore, Tuscania, Lazio
- Santa Maria Maggiore, Vasto, Abruzzo
- Santa Maria Maggiore, Venice, Veneto

== Other uses ==
- Santa Maria Maggiore, Piedmont, a municipality in Verbano-Cusio-Ossola, Piedmont, northern Italy

== See also ==
- Santa Maria (disambiguation)
- Saint Mary of the Snows (disambiguation)
- Santa Maria Maior (disambiguation) (Portuguese: Saint Mary Major)
- Santa María la Mayor (disambiguation) (Spanish: Saint Mary Major)
- Saint Mary Major (disambiguation)
