= False front =

Architectural feature

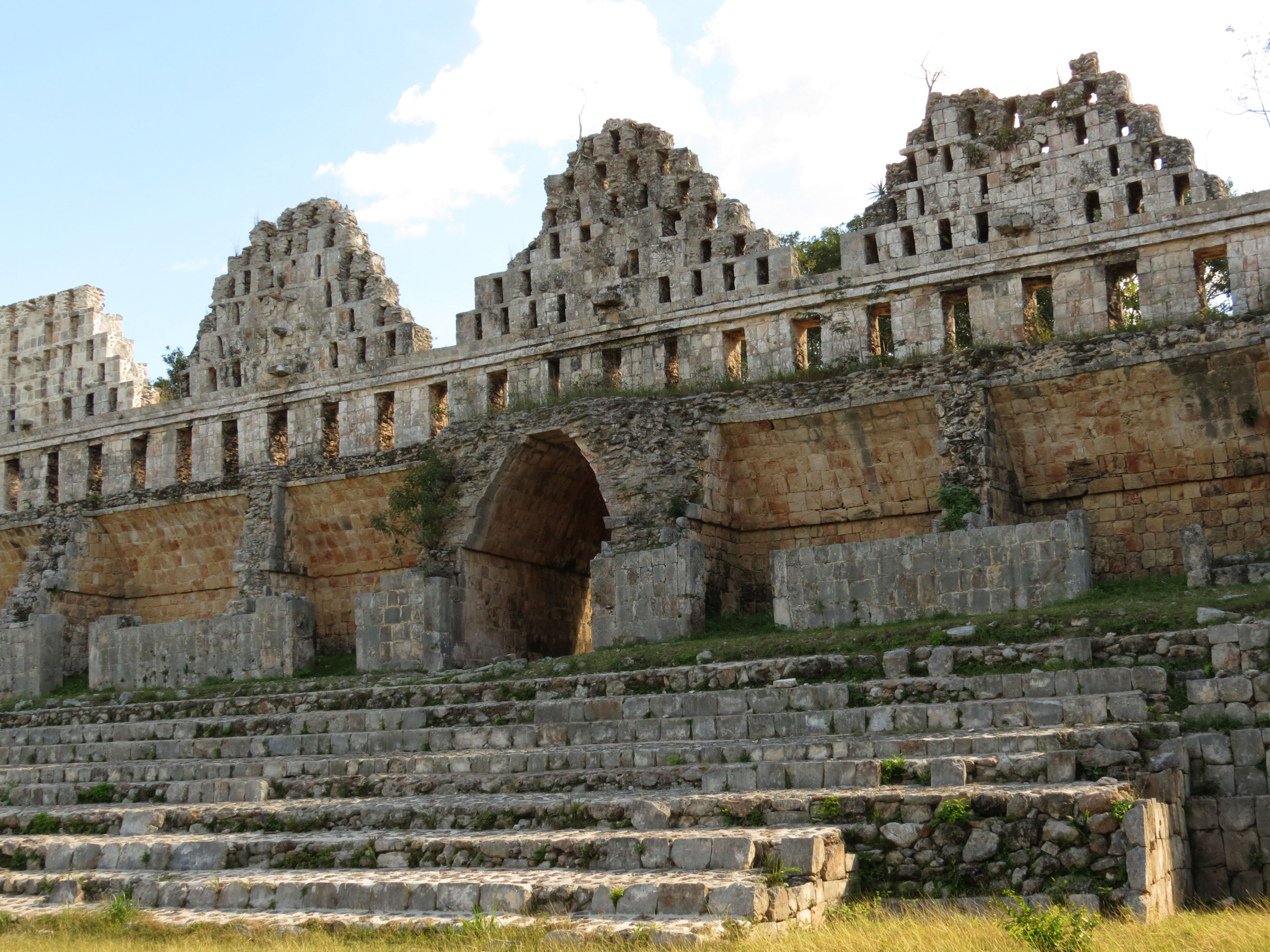
Mayan roof combs in Uxmal

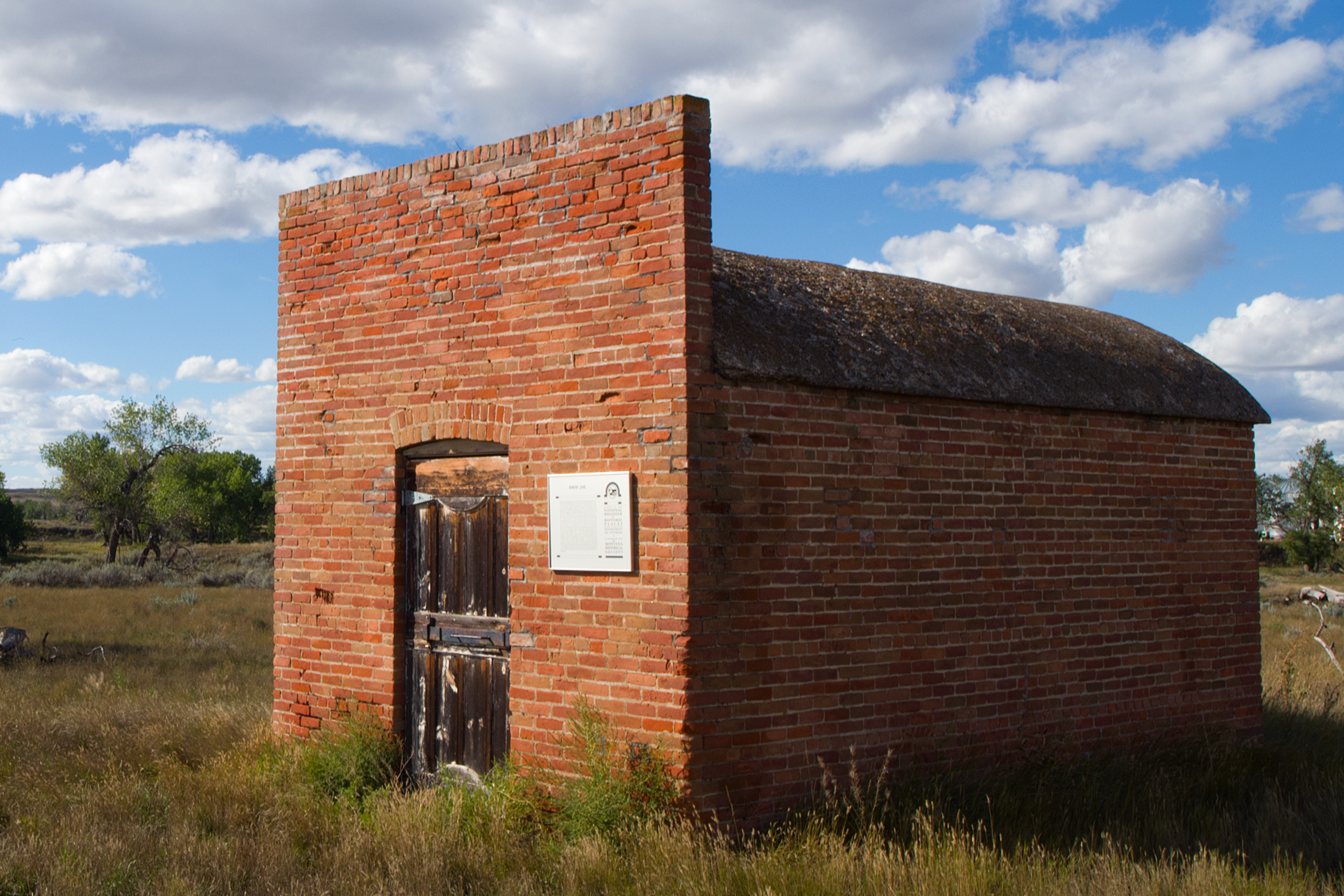
Western false front architecture: Brick false front of Ismay Jail in Montana

In architecture, the false front (also false facade, flying facade, screen wall) is a facade designed to disguise the true characteristics of a building, usually to beautify it. The architectural design and purposes of these wall-like features vary:

- making a building appear larger, more important, and better-built, like in the Western false front architecture, German Blendfassaden (lit. 'blind facades') or Brick Gothic main facades (Schaufassaden, lit. 'show facades'). Some sources also use the term screen facade (German: Schirmfassade) when discussing the Medieval and Renaissance churches, not to be confused with the modern "membrane" screen facade;
- creating a fake appearance to improve aesthetics, an architectural equivalent of trompe-l'oeil;
- in facadism, keeping the old facades with the goal of preserving the visual character of a historical neighborhood while allowing an entirely modern design of the actual buildings. In the view of preservationists, this creates a "Disneyland of false fronts";
- deliberate violation of the truth to materials principle ("false in material") for economical, insulation, or aesthetic purposes, like masonry veneer using a non-structural outer layer of stone or a membrane screen facade;
- hiding a gable roof, like a tall parapet wall, as opposed to cross-sectional facade;
- a purely decorative way to increase height, like the one of a roof comb, a flat structure that tops buildings in Mesoamerican architecture. Sometimes the comb was shifted from the center of the roof to one of the walls, forming a flying facade.

Tradition of "show facades" goes back to the very beginnings of the architecture, when the simplest buildings might have just one opening serving both as a door and a window. The special role of the wall with this opening was stressed through articulation and decoration.

Outside of architecture, "false front" is used to describe a deceptive outward appearance in general, false hair in front (like bangs). In cabinetry, false drawer fronts give sink cabinets the appearance of having drawers (for aesthetical reasons) where the sink and plumbing leave insufficient space for them.

== Facadism ==
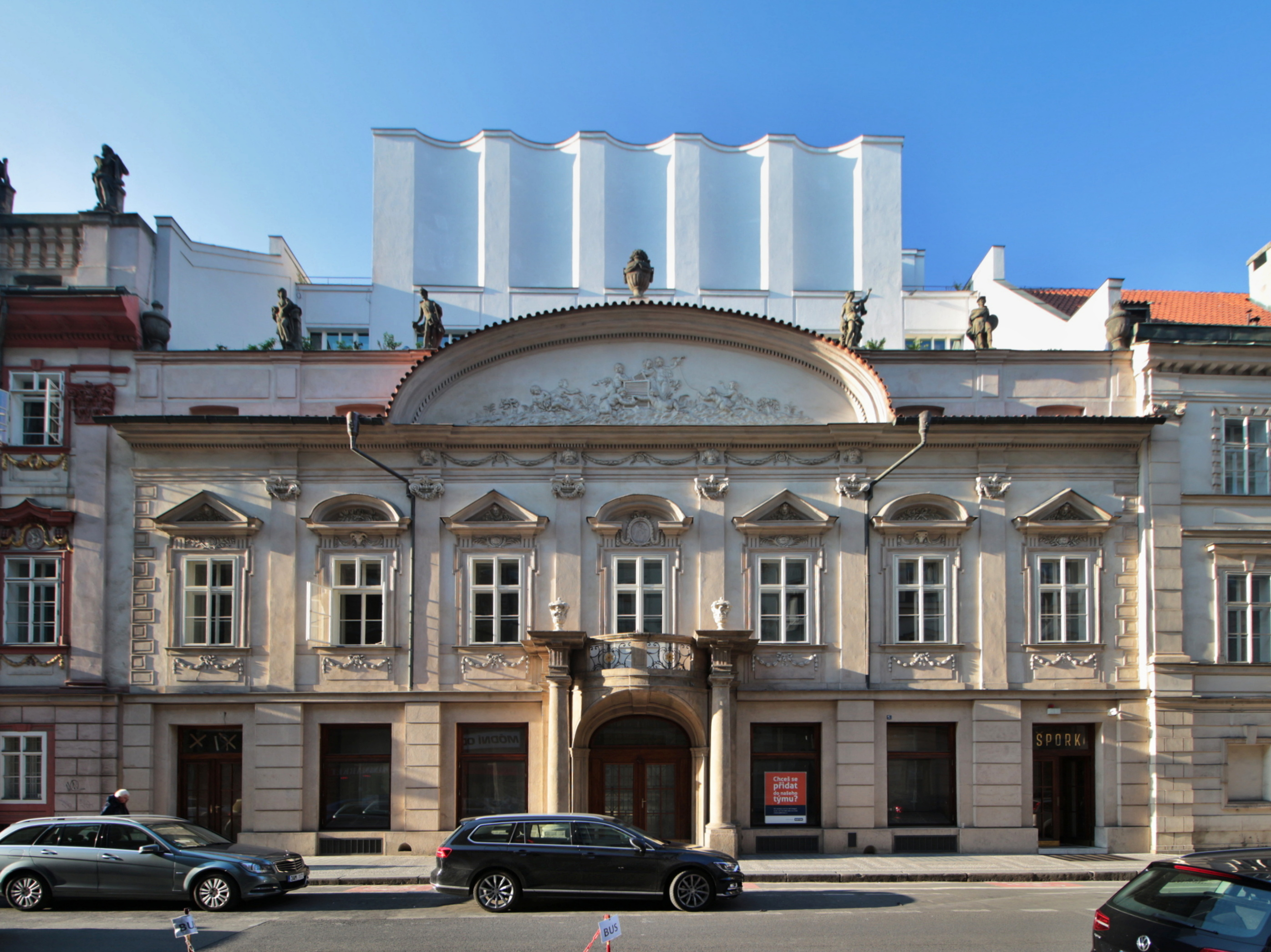
In the early 1920s, the Anglo-Czechoslovak Bank tore down its head office, the Sweerts-Sporck Palace in Prague, and had it rebuilt behind the preserved façade on a design by architect Josef Gočár, visible in the background

Facadism or façadism (also pejorative facadectomy, façadomy) is the architectural and construction practice where the facade of a building is designed or constructed separately from the rest of a building, or when only the facade of a building is preserved with new buildings erected behind or around it.

There are aesthetic and historical reasons for preserving building facades. Facadism can be the response to the interiors of a building becoming unusable, such as being damaged by fire. In developing areas, however, the practice is sometimes used by property developers seeking to redevelop a site as a compromise with preservationists who wish to preserve buildings of historical or aesthetic interest. It can be regarded as a compromise between historic preservation and demolition and thus has been lauded as well as decried.

== Screen facades in Romanesque architecture ==
Screen facade of Church of Notre-Dame la Grande, Poitiers

Popularity of Romanesque church fronts facades in the form of flat, decorated screens (façades-écrans), as opposed to projecting tower-porches, is traced to 11th-century Poitou, western France. Stone vaulting enabled bell towers to be supported over the crossing of the nave and transept, reducing the need for towers at the entrance. Dispensing with the tower-porch also allowed larger western windows to illuminate the vaulted interior and provided a broad surface for arcades and sculpture.

An early example was Saint-Jean-de-Montierneuf in Poitiers, founded in 1069 by William VIII, Duke of Aquitaine. The original scheme included two western bell towers, but construction had barely begun before this arrangement was abandoned in favour of a straight screen façade, dated to approximately 1086–1096. The ground plan of the facade was unearthed during 1990 excavations, with the sculpted fragments reused in the later front indicate that its decoration included carved archivolts. Marie-Thérèse Camus, a French architectural historian, suggested that Montierneuf have served as a prototype for the large, sculpted screen façades of western France, with its design signifying a transition from towered church fronts to the elaborate façades of the 12th century, as in Notre-Dame-la-Grande in Poitiers.

== Show facades ==
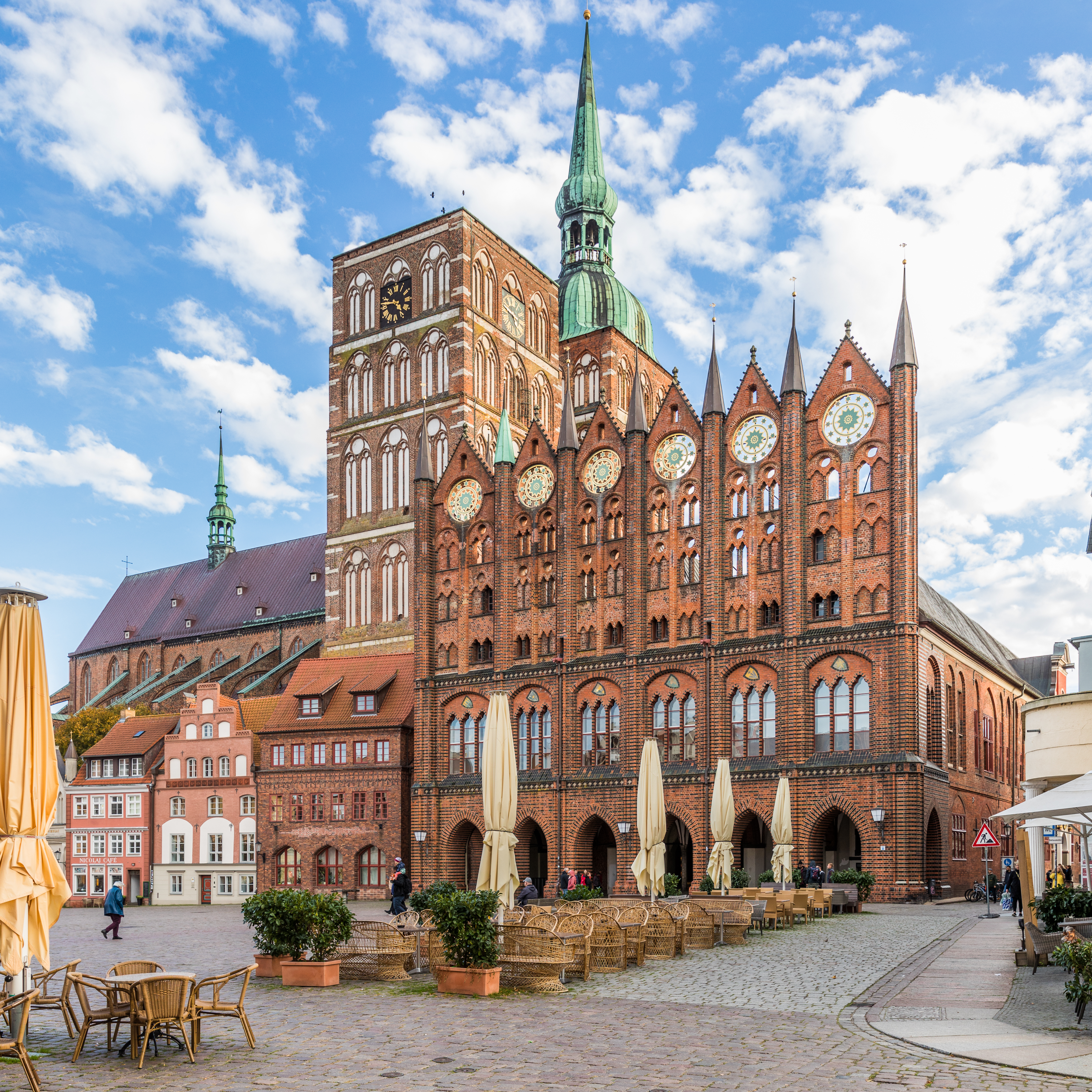
Flying facade of the Stralsunder City Hall

In the Brick Gothic, the Schaufassaden (lit. 'show facades', display facades), the facades facing the main street, were richly decorated and frequently concealed the cross-section structure of the building.

== Lombard architecture ==
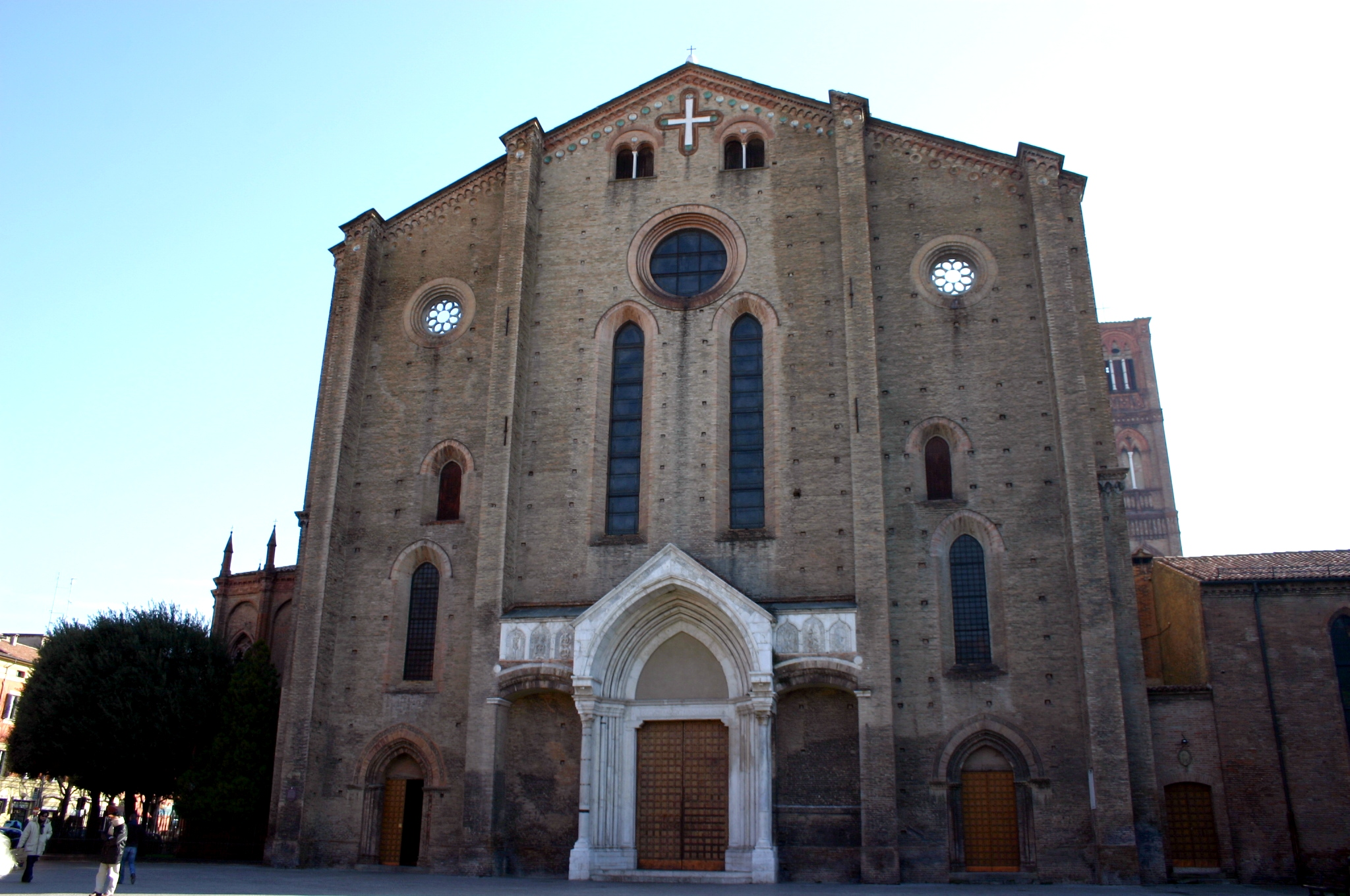
San Francesco in Bologna with the see-through oculi

In Lombard Gothic architecture, the facciata a vento (lit. 'wind facade') is a type of screen facade where the stone facing rises higher than the roofline, characterized by windows (often the round oculi) that open into the empty sky ("sfondanti sul cielo"). Angiola Maria Romanini identified these "windows breaking into the sky" as a defining stylistic hallmark of the region's Gothic architecture.

While the church of San Francesco in Brescia (c. 1254) was traditionally considered the prototype of this style, recent stratigraphical analysis suggests that the upper section of its facade is a later addition. Instead, the Basilica of San Francesco in Bologna (completed 1263) is likely the true innovative prototype of the facciata a vento.

The facciata a vento reduces the building's front to a two-dimensional screen, replacing the earlier Romanesque tradition of the elaborately 3D-sculpted German: Schirmfassade (screen facade). Following its introduction by the Mendicant orders, the style became a distinctively Lombard phenomenon, spreading to Cremona Cathedral, Monza Cathedral, and the (now demolished) Santa Maria della Scala in Milan. The style eventually migrated to the Adriatic coast, influencing architecture in the Marche region.

== Western false front architecture ==
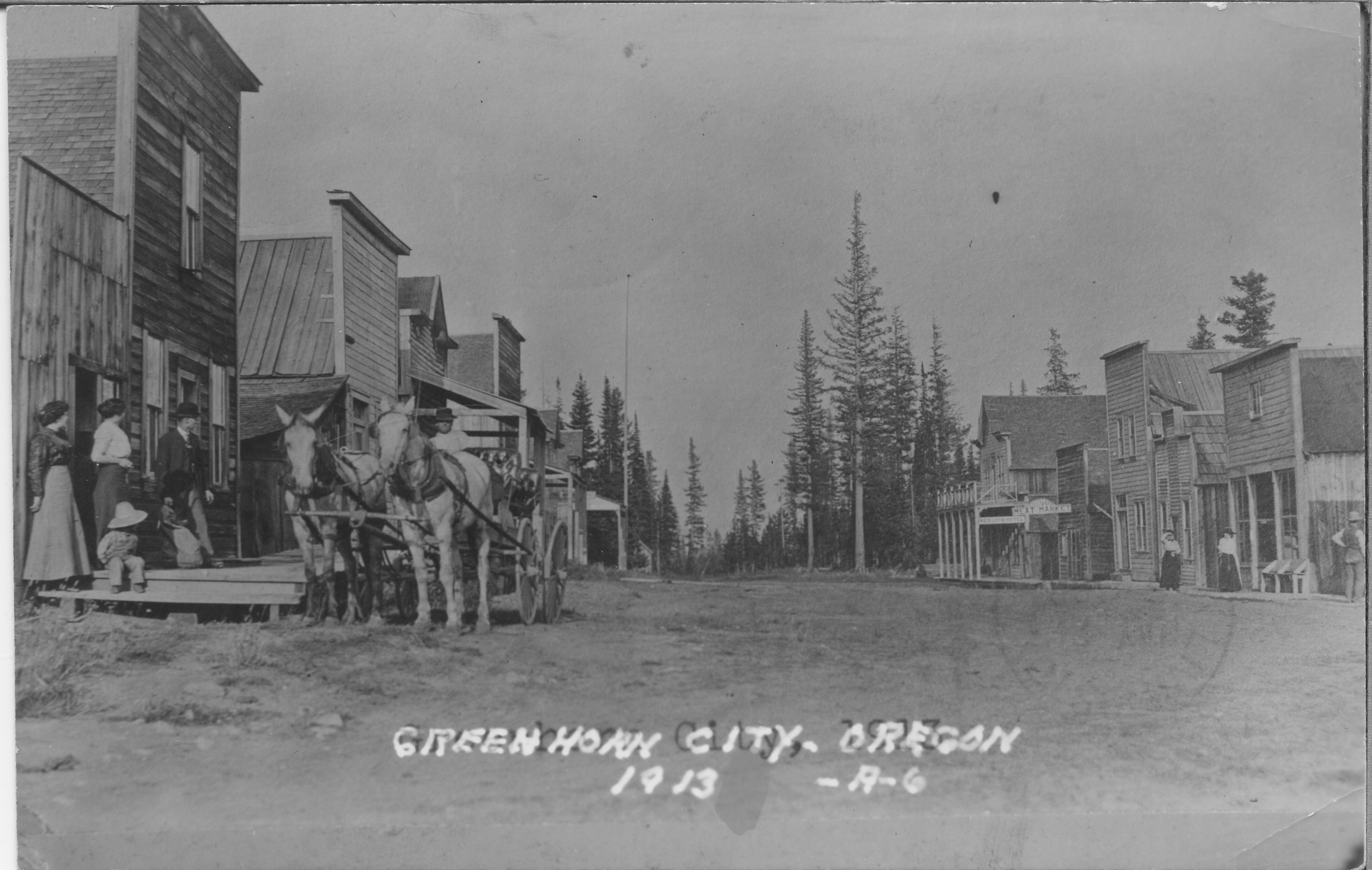
False front commercial buildings in Greenhorn, Oregon, 1913

Western false front architecture or false front commercial architecture is a type of commercial architecture used in the Old West of the United States. Often used on two-story buildings, the style includes a false front facade often hiding a gable roof.

The goal for buildings in this style is to project an image of stability and success. By emulating the rectangular profile of buildings in eastern North American cities, the style attempted to lend a more settled, urban feel to small frontier towns.

- the front façade of the building has a parapet that largely conceals the roof;
- the building either has a front gable, gambrel or a bowed roof; and
- higher grade materials and greater ornamentation that is featured on the façade compared to other sides of the building.

== See also ==
- Fake building, an urban-building-like shell housing unsightly machinery
- Westwork, a structural element that also presents a show facade
- Rood screen and iconostasis, internal decorative walls in church
- Stepped gable, Dutch gable, and clock gable, designs at the top of the triangular gable-end of a building projecting above the roofline
- Bell-gable, a wall extension in the church in lieue of the bell tower
- Potemkin village, the use of structures to make the grim reality appear better
- Cladding (construction), a thin layer of material used primarily for better weather resistance, but also for thermal insulation and appearance
  - Stone veneer, cladding using a thin layer of stone
  - Formstone, a type of stucco imitating stone
- Harvard brick, a technique for building brick facades in imitation of much older ones
- Rustication (architecture), a range of masonry techniques contrasting with smooth ashlar

== Sources ==
- Camus, Marie-Thérèse (1991). "De la facade à tour(s) à la facade-écran dans les pays de l'Ouest : l'exemple de Saint-Jean-de-Montierneuf de Poitiers" [From the tower facade(s) to the screen facade in Western countries: The example of Saint-Jean-de-Montierneuf in Poitiers]. Cahiers de civilisation médiévale (in French). 34 (135): 237–253. doi:10.3406/ccmed.1991.2497. ISSN 0007-9731.
- Ching, Francis D. K. (2011-12-30). A Visual Dictionary of Architecture. John Wiley & Sons. ISBN 978-1-118-16049-7.
- Davies, Nikolas; Jokiniemi, Erkki (2012-05-04). Architect's Illustrated Pocket Dictionary. Routledge. ISBN 978-1-136-44406-7.
- Feirer, Mark D.; Feirer, John L. (2010). Carpentry & Building Construction. Woodland Hills, California: Glencoe/McGraw-Hill. pp. 786–787. ISBN 978-0-07-879784-2.
- Huber, Rudolf; Rieth, Renatehg, eds. (2008-12-31). Das Baudenkmal: Zu Denkmalschutz und Denkmalpflege. Systematisches Fachwörterbuch [The Architectural Monument: On Historic Preservation and Conservation. A Systematic Glossary] (in German). De Gruyter. doi:10.1515/9783110978872. ISBN 978-3-598-11113-6.
- Giese, Francine (2021-03-22). "The Hybridization of Sebka Ornament". Mudejarismo and Moorish Revival in Europe: Cultural Negotiations and Artistic Translations in the Middle Ages and 19th-century Historicism. Brill. pp. 431–460. doi:10.1163/9789004448582_022. ISBN 978-90-04-44858-2.
- Heath, Kingston Wm. (1989). "False-Front Architecture on Montana's Urban Frontier". Perspectives in Vernacular Architecture. 3. Vernacular Architecture Forum: 199–213. doi:10.2307/3514305. ISSN 0887-9885. JSTOR 3514305.
- Koepf, Hans; Binding, Günther (2005). "Schaufassade". Bildwörterbuch der Architektur [Illustrated Dictionary of Architecture] (PDF). Kröners Taschenausgabe (in German). Vol. 194 (4th ed.). Stuttgart: Alfred Kröner Verlag. ISBN 978-3-520-19404-6.
- Kreuz, Gottfried Eugen (2016-07-11). Besonderer Ort, poetischer Blick: Untersuchungen zu Räumen und Bildern in Statius' Silvae (in German). Vandenhoeck & Ruprecht. ISBN 978-3-647-20870-1.
- Lessard, Michel (Summer 1987). "L'art du trompe-l'oeil: le phénomène de la fausse facade" [The art of trompe-l'oeil: the phenomenon of the false front] (PDF). Cap-aux-Diamants (in French). 3 (2): 37–40. ISSN 0829-7983.
- Malone, Carolyn Marino (2004-01-01). facade as Spectacle: Ritual and Ideology at Wells Cathedral. Brill. ISBN 978-90-04-13840-7.
- Pech, Anton; Pommer, Georg; Zeininger, Johannes (2014-09-23). Fassaden (in German). Birkhäuser. ISBN 978-3-99043-087-3.
- Phillips, Mark (2018-06-26). Vocabulary Dictionary and Workbook: 2,856 Words You Must Know. A J Cornell Publications. ISBN 978-0-9727439-4-5.
- Rossetti, Jores (2018). "Il fastigio a vento nei prospetti sacri del gotico lombardo. Il caso del San Francesco di Brescia: nascita o recupero di un modello?" (PDF). Studi e ricerche di storia dell'architettura (in Italian) (3): 30–37. doi:10.17401/STUDIERICERCHE-3/2018-ROSSETTI.
- Stevens, Deirdre A. (May 2008). Changing the Perspective of Facadism within San Francisco (Doctor of Architecture thesis). University of Hawaiʻi at Mānoa.
- Stone, Daniel James (1931). The culture of the Mayas as shown by their ruins (MA thesis). University of the Pacific.
- Thompson, Bethany (1983). Historic Bridge Inventory, Island of Oahu. State of Hawaii, Department of Transportation, Highways Division.
- Treu, M. (2012). Signs, Streets, and Storefronts: A History of Architecture and Graphics Along America's Commercial Corridors. Johns Hopkins University Press. ISBN 978-1-4214-0494-3.
