= Santa María la Mayor =

Santa María la Mayor is the Spanish term for Holy Mary the Major or the Greatest, and is the equivalent of the Italian term Santa Maria Maggiore. As a Marian devotion, it is a common name for churches and sites, including:

== Spain ==
- Santa María la Mayor, Alcañiz
- Santa María la Mayor, Alcaudete
- Real Colegiata de Santa María la Mayor, Antequera
- Santa María la Mayor, Caspe, Aragon
- Santa María la Mayor del Pilar, Caspe, Aragon
- Santa María la Mayor, Calatayud, Aragon
- Co-cathedral of Santa María la Mayor, Emerita Augusta
- Santa María la Mayor, Épila
- Santa María la Mayor, Híjar
- Santa María la Mayor, Huéscar
- Santa María la Mayor, Salas, Asturias
- Santa María la Mayor, Toro
- Santa María la Mayor, Villamuriel de Cerrato
- Santa María la Mayor, Villanueva de Gómez (ruins)
- Santa María la Mayor, Zamora

== Argentina ==
- Reducción de Santa María la Mayor, Argentina

== See also ==
- Santa Maria (disambiguation)
- Saint Mary of the Snows (disambiguation)
- Santa Maria Maggiore (disambiguation) (Italian: Saint Mary Major)
- Santa Maria Maior (disambiguation) (Portuguese: Saint Mary Major)
- Saint Mary Major (disambiguation)
