= Santa Maria Maior =

Santa Maria Maior may refer:

== Places ==
- Santa Maria Maior (Chaves), a parish in the municipality of Chaves
- Santa Maria Maior (Lisbon), a parish in the municipality of Lisbon
- Santa Maria Maior (Viana do Castelo), a parish in the municipality of Viana do Castelo
- Santa Maria Maior (Funchal), a parish in the municipality of Funchal, Madeira

== Churches ==
- Santa Maria Maior de Lisboa, Lisbon, Portugal; a Roman Catholic cathedral
- Church of Santa Maria Maior, Chaves, Portugal
- Cathedral of St. Mary the Great, Viana do Castelo, Portugal

== See also ==
- Santa Maria (disambiguation)
- Saint Mary of the Snows (disambiguation)
- Église Notre-Dame la Grande, Poitiers, France; a Catholic church also called Latin: Sancta Maria Maior, lit. 'Saint Mary Major'
- Santa Maria Maggiore (disambiguation) (Italian: Saint Mary Major)
- Santa María la Mayor (disambiguation) (Spanish: Saint Mary Major)
- Saint Mary Major (disambiguation)
