= Notre Dame des Neiges =

Notre Dame des Neiges (French: Our Lady of the Snows) may refer to:

- Notre-Dame-des-Neiges, Les Basques, Bas-Saint-Laurent, Quebec, Canada; a rural municipality
- Notre Dame des Neiges Cemetery, Mount Royal, Montreal Island, Quebec, Canada; the largest cemetery in Canada
- Abbey of Notre-Dame des Neiges, Ardèche, Vivarais, Auvergne-Rhône-Alpes, Southeastern France, France; a Trappist monastery
- Notre-Dame des Neiges, L'Alpe d'Huez, Huez, Isère, Dauphiné, Auvergne-Rhône-Alpes, Southeastern France, France; a Roman-Catholic church
- Notre-Dame des Neiges (painting), an 1844 painting by Jules-Claude Ziegler

== See also ==
- Saint Mary of the Snows (disambiguation) or Our Lady of the Snows
- Notre Dame (disambiguation)
- Neige (disambiguation)
- Princess Marie des Neiges of Bourbon-Parma (born 1937) French aristocrat
