= Piediluco =

Coordinates: 42.53537°N 12.76079°E

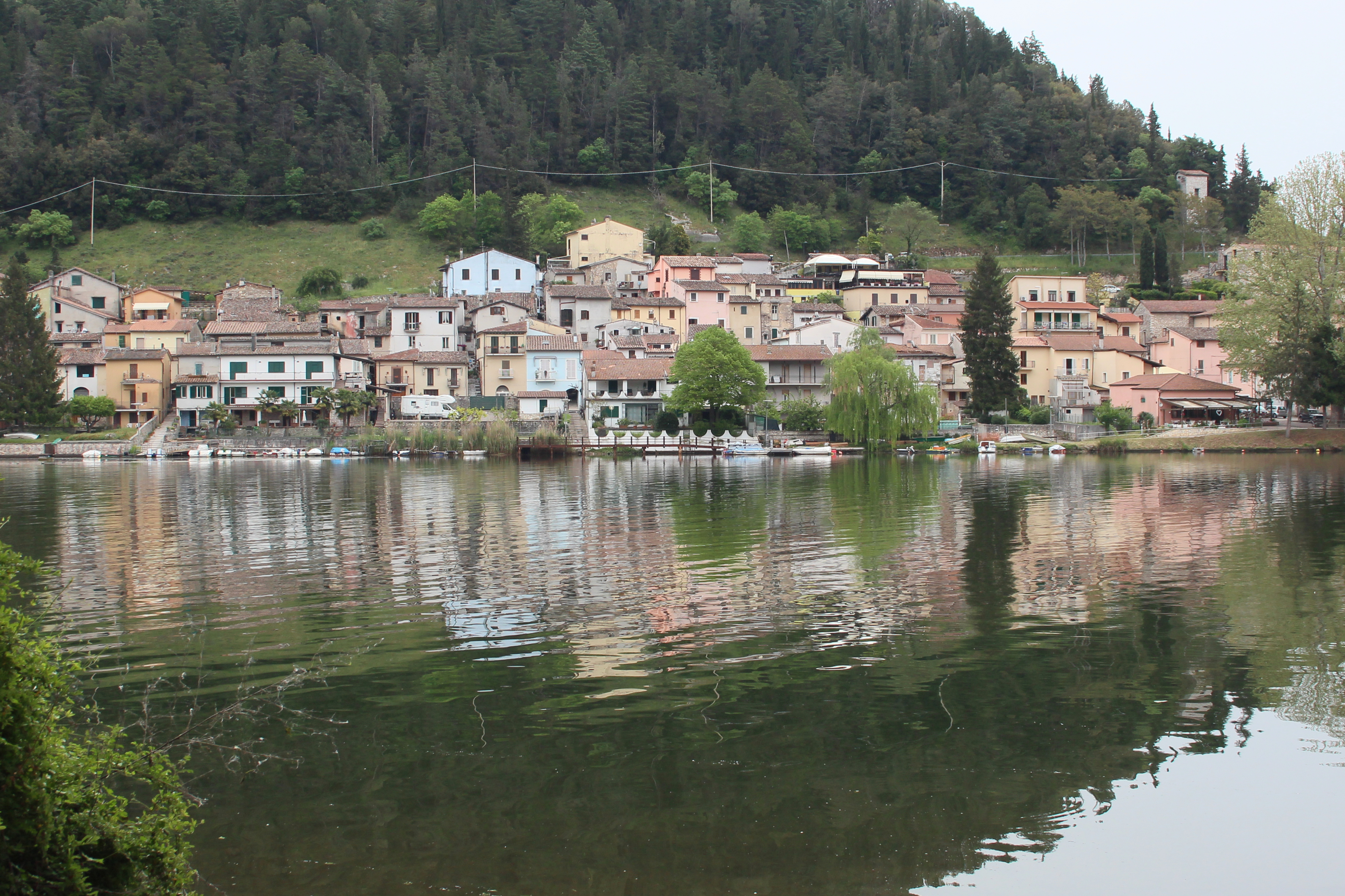
View of Piediluco

Piediluco is a frazione of the municipality of Terni in the Province of Terni, Umbria, Italy. It is 375 metres (1,230 ft) above sea level, and had a population of 367 inhabitants as of 2021.

Formerly an independent municipality, Piediluco was suppressed in 1927 and incorporated into Terni.

== Etymology ==
The name Piediluco recalls that the settlement was established at the foot (pié) of a sacred grove (lucus), believed by some to have been dedicated to the goddess Velia, a term associated with stagnant waters or marshes. The same root is linked to the Velabrum in Rome, the marshy area between the Tiber, the Palatine, and the Capitoline, and is also connected to the name of the river Velino.

== History ==
Some writers identified Piediluco as having arisen on the ruins of the ancient Tiara mentioned by Dionysius of Halicarnassus, although no traces of ancient constructions remain.

The original settlement stood on the summit of the mountain above the present village. It was destroyed by the Lombards and during baronial wars. In later periods Piediluco was a county and also a duchy.

The rocca dominating the settlement, largely rebuilt in 1314 by the cardinal legate Gil Albornoz, was financed in part by the inhabitants of Rieti, who reached an agreement with Blasco Fernández de Belvis, nephew of the cardinal legate. Blasco and Garcia were killed in Piediluco, and Pope Urban V carried out a harsh and bloody retaliation. The two Spaniards were buried in the Basilica of Saint Francis in Assisi. The fortress also served as a place of imprisonment for Corrado Trinci, lord of Foligno.

During the prolonged conflicts between Terni and Rieti over the opening of the Velino riverbed, the inhabitants of Piediluco were allied with Rieti and repeatedly came into conflict with Terni, particularly in the 15th century.

Pope Sixtus IV arrived in Piediluco on 8 October 1476, during an outbreak of plague in Rome, and remained there for two days, drawn by the beauty and pleasantness of the location. Pope Clement VIII visited in 1596 with a large retinue during his inspection of reclamation works in the Rieti plain. The settlement was affected by numerous strong earthquakes.

Pope Clement XI removed Piediluco from Sabina and attached it to the province of Spoleto; it later formed part of the district of Terni.

== Geography ==
Piediluco lies on the Rieti plateau, on the shores of Lake Piediluco, at the foot of a bare and steep mountain crowned by the fortress. Its waters flow from east to west toward an outlet that joins the Velino about 3 kilometres (1.9 mi) before the Marmore Falls. The village lies 7 miles (11 km) from Terni, 3 miles (4.8 km) from Labro, and 6 miles (9.7 km) from Arrone.

The settlement lies at the foot of Mount Caperne, which forms a peninsula in the lake. The surrounding landscape is noted for its beauty, with the lake and green hills contributing to its character.

Opposite the settlement, where the lake narrows and not far from the shore, rises another cone-shaped mountain, known as Caperno or Monte di Sant'Emidio. This mountain is covered in dense and well-preserved woodland of boxwood and holm oak, which serves as a barrier to southern winds. In antiquity it was believed to be sacred to Diana. On its lower slopes stands the small chapel of Sant'Egidio.

Nearby, at a small flat area at the base of this mountain, an acoustic phenomenon known as the Echo of Piediluco can be heard. When the voice is directed toward the village through a kind of natural sounding point, the echo distinctly repeats as many words as can be spoken clearly within an interval of more than two seconds..

The climate is temperate but rather humid, with prevailing winds from the southeast and north.
