= Snowman (disambiguation) =

A snowman is a temporary sculpture made of snow. Snowman or snowmen may also refer to:

== Arts and media ==
=== Fictional characters ===
- Snowman (comics), a Batman villain
- The protagonist in Margaret Atwood's Oryx and Crake
- The Snowman (Courage the Cowardly Dog), the villain in Courage the Cowardly Dog
- Blue Snowman, a fictional villain who appeared in DC Comics' adventures of Wonder Woman
- Snowman, the nickname of Cledus Snow in the Smokey and the Bandit film series, played by Jerry Reed

=== Film and television ===
- The Snowman, a 1982 animated television special based on the book by Raymond Briggs
- The Snowman and the Snowdog, a 2012 animated television special based on the 1982 film The Snowman by Raymond Briggs
- The Snow Man (film), 1899 French short film
- The Snowman (1933), a 1933 animated short film by Ted Eshbaugh
- Der Schneemann, a 1944 German film
- Snowmen (film), a 2010 American film
- "The Snowmen", a 2012 episode of Doctor Who
- The Snowman (2017 film), a British crime drama film

=== Literature ===
- "The Snowman" (fairy tale), a fairy tale by Hans Christian Andersen
- The Snowman (picture book), a 1978 children's book by Raymond Briggs
- The Snowman (Fauser novel), a 1981 crime novel by Jörg Fauser
- The Snowman (Nesbø novel), a 2007 crime novel by Jo Nesbø
- The Snowman, horror novel by R. L. Stine
- The Snowman, a 1965 novel by Charles Haldeman
- The Snowman, a 1973 novel by Arthur Maling
- The Snow Man, a 1921 poem by Wallace Stevens
- Snow Man, a 1999 novel written by Carolyn Chute
- Snowmen (short story), a short story by Steven Millhauser

=== Music ===
- Snowman (band), a band from Perth, Australia
  - Snowman (album), their self-titled album
- "Snowman" (April song)
- "Snowman" (Sia song)
- "Snowman", a song by Anti-Nowhere League from We Are...The League
- "Snowman", the closing track on XTC's album English Settlement
- "Snowman", a track taken from a film The Snowman covered by Rainbow on the album Bent Out of Shape
- "Snow Men", a song by Gen Hoshino from Yellow Dancer
- Snow Man, a Japanese boy band
- The Snowmen (band), an English band known for their 1981 recording of "Hokey Cokey"

== People ==
- Daniel Snowman (born 1938), British historian
- Emanuel Snowman (1886–1970), English jeweller
- Isaac Snowman (1874–1947), English artist, brother of Emanuel
- Jacob Snowman (1871–1959), English medical doctor
- Kenneth Snowman (1919–2002), English jeweller, son of Emanuel
- Nicholas Snowman (born 1944), English arts administrator, son of Kenneth
- "The snowman", a nickname of convicted spy Andrew Daulton Lee (born 1952)
- Snowman, a nickname of rapper Young Jeezy (born 1977)
- Snowman, the nickname of American MMA fighter Jeff Monson (born 1971)
- The Snowman, a professional wrestler from the United States Wrestling Association

== Other uses ==
- "The snowman asteroid", shape of the trans-Neptunian object 486958 Arrokoth
- "Snowman craters", nickname for three overlapping craters on 4 Vesta
- Snowman (horse), a show jumping champion horse
- Snowman or eight-ender, a perfect score in one end of a curling match

== See also ==
- Yeti, also known as the "Abominable Snowman"
- Snow woman (disambiguation)
