= Art Monastery =

The Art Monastery is an American non-profit organization based in Hawi, Hawai'i and founded in San Francisco, California (with previous locations in Calvi dell'Umbria, Labro, Caramanico Terme, and Lecce, Italy; and Springfield, Vermont). The Art Monastery Project was founded by American artists Suiko Betsy McCall and Christopher Fülling in 2007 with the purpose of converting an historic Italian monastery into an international art production center in cooperation with the community that hosts it.

A pilot project was created at the Casale Santa Brigida in Calvi dell’Umbria now known as country house Vista sull'oliveto. In 2010 the Art Monastery Project found residence in the monastery San Antonio of the medieval Italian hill town Labro, 1.5 hours north east of Rome. The building dates back to the 17th century when it was a Franciscan monastery. It now houses also the archives of Labro, a hotel, a theater and a church. The project was later hosted by L'accademia dell Rinascimento Mediterraneo outside Lecce, Puglia, Italy. In 2015, the Art Monastery relocated to a 7-acre farm on the banks of the Connecticut River in southern Vermont. Seven years later, the project seized the opportunity to take up residence on a 14-acre sanctuary and permaculture farm on the Big Island of Hawai'i.

The Art Monastery cultivates personal awakening and cultural transformation through artmaking, spiritual practice, and reciprocal relationship with the earth. The non-profit currently offers meditation & creativity classes, silent meditation retreats, and transformational rituals online and in various retreat centers in California, Alaska, and Vermont.

== Press ==
=== Italian Press ===
On June 2, 2010, an article on the Art Monastery Project appeared in La Repubblica, the second largest circulation Italian daily general-interest newspaper. Articles have also appeared in Rieti newspapers Corriere and Il Messaggero, and the left-of-center paper Il Riformista. The Art Monastery is mentioned in a July 2009 article in NarniNews. On June 26, the Art Monastery was the subject of a radio interview with the mayor of Calvi dell'Umbria on RAI 1.

=== International Press ===
On October 17, 2009, the Art Monastery Project was picked as one of "Five great Workaway working holidays" in the Saturday Evening Guardian.

"'Energetic dreamers' are sought by a community of English-speaking international artists in a former boutique B&B 45 minutes north-east of Rome. The group is transforming an old monastery in Umbria into a non-profit arts centre, and needs help with that, as well as on arts projects, maintaining the grounds, cleaning the pool and guest rooms, organising concerts and artistic productions. You get a tent in an olive grove or shared room in the ex-B&B, can join in meditation and nature walks . . . and if you really fit in you may be invited to stay for good!

=== 2010 Lonely Planet ===
In the 2010 Lonely Planet guide to Tuscany and Umbria, the Art Monastery Project is mentioned three times. For example:

"Fancy a Nick Drake number performed on lute with your dinner? How about a late-night improv game after a round of limoncello (lemon liquor) that you helped make? …You’ll get the requisite pink sunsets over the terrace …view over the idyllic countryside below, and odd wild boar jogging past, but you’ll also experience working side-by-side in the permaculture garden, learning to bake bread, or starting your morning with yoga on the terrace."
