= Snow woman =

Snow woman may refer to:

== Folklore ==
- A female yeti (abominable snowwoman); a crytozoologic and mythological creature of the Himalayas
- Yuki-onna (Japanese: 雪女, lit. 'snow-woman'), a Japanese folkloric creature

== Arts and entertainment ==
- Snow woman, a monster; see List of female monsters in literature
- Snow Woman (story; Japanese: ゆきおんな, romanized: Yuki-onna), a story in the Tokyo Kodomo Club
- The Snow Women (novella), a 1970 sword-and-sorcery novella by Fritz Leiber
- The Snow Woman (novel), a 1968 novel by Stella Gibbons
- The Snow Woman (film; Japanese: 怪談雪女郎, romanized: Kaidan Yukijorō, lit. 'Ghost Story of the Snow Woman'), a 1968 Japanese horror film
- "Snow Woman" (TV episode; Japanese: 雪ん子, romanized: Yukin-ko), a 1968 episode 68 of GeGeGe no Kitarō (1968 TV series)
- "The Snow Woman" part 1,2,3 (TV episodes; Japanese: 雪女, romanized: Yukion'na), several 2010s episodes of Folktales from Japan

== Other uses ==
- snowwoman (sculpture), a female-form snowman, a type of anthropomorphic snow sculpture
- Snøkjerringa Hill (Norwegian: Snowwoman Hill), Ahlmann Ridge, Queen Maud Land, Antarctica

== See also ==
- Snežana (Cyrillic: Снежана; transliterated: Snezhana; lit. Snow Woman), a Slavic female given name
- Our Lady of the Snows (disambiguation)
- Snowman (disambiguation)
- Snow (disambiguation)
- Women (disambiguation)
- Woman (disambiguation)
