= Polyptych of Miglionico =

Altarpiece by Cima da Conegliano

The Polyptych of Miglionico is a large, multicompartment Renaissance-style altarpiece painted in 1499 by Cima da Conegliano and housed in the church of Santa Maria Maggiore in the town of Miglionico, province of Matera, Basilicata, Italy.

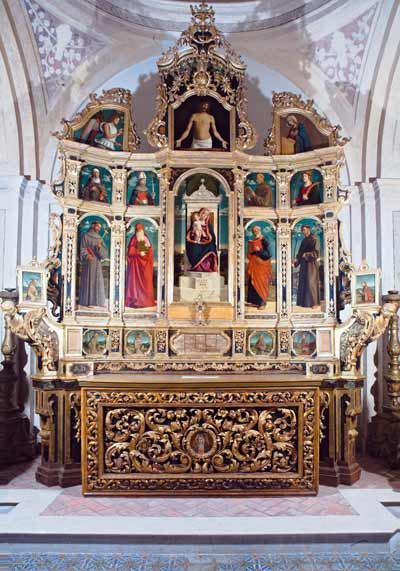
Polyptych in chapel

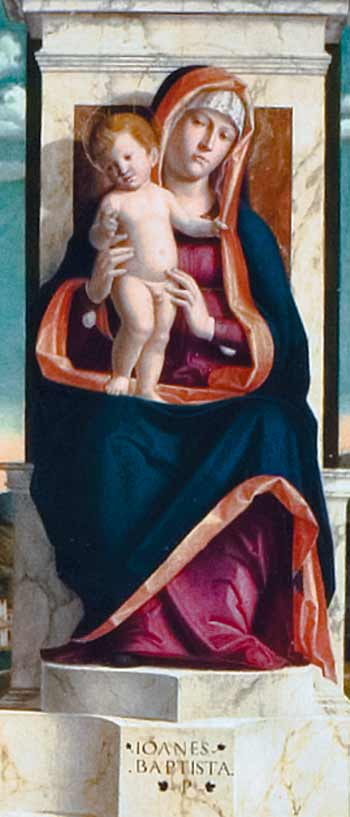
Enthroned Madonna and Child

The large altarpiece consists of 18 wooden panels painted with tempera and oil in a style pioneered by Giovanni Bellini. In the center of the work is an Enthroned Madonna with Child. To the left of the center panel is a standing St Francis of Assisi and St Jerome. To the right, St Peter and St Antony of Padua. Above are half-busts of St Clare, St Louis of Toulouse, St Bernardino of Siena, and St Catherine of Alexandria. Atop the piece is a Christ with an Annunciation. In the base are a series of Franciscan proto-martyrs. The central panel with a nativity scene is missing.

The work was originally present in a Franciscan structure in the Veneto, but acquired in 1598 by the Archbishop Marcantonio Mazzone. The center panel is signed by a JOANES BAPTISTA, which in 1907, along with the stylistic elements, led Martin Wackernagel to attribute the work to Giovanni Battista Cima da Conegliano.
