= Saint Mary Major (disambiguation) =

Saint Mary Major, or Santa Maria Maggiore, is a major basilica in Rome.

Saint Mary Major may also refer to:

== Places ==
- St Mary Major, Exeter, Wonford Hundred, Devon, England, UK; a former parish in Great Britain

=== Churches ===
==== France ====
See Sainte Marie Majeure (disambiguation) § Churches

==== Italy ====
See Santa Maria Maggiore (disambiguation) § Churches

==== Portugal ====
See Santa Maria Maior (disambiguation) § Churches

==== Spain ====
See Santa María la Mayor (disambiguation)

==== United Kingdom ====
- Church of St Mary Major, Ilchester, Somerset, England
- Church of St Mary Major, Exeter, Devonshire, England

== Other uses ==
- Dedication of the Basilica of Saint Mary Major (Saint Mary Major Day), a Roman Catholic feast day celebrated on 5 August
- Mary, mother of Jesus; the major Saint Mary
- St. Mary Major League, a soccer league in Jamaica

== See also ==
- Santa Maria Maggiore (disambiguation) (Italian: Saint Mary Major)
- Santa María la Mayor (disambiguation) (Spanish: Saint Mary Major)
- Santa Maria Maior (disambiguation) (Portuguese: Saint Mary Major)
- Église Notre-Dame la Grande, Poitiers, France; (French: St-Mary the Great Church) a Catholic church also called Latin: Sancta Maria Maior, lit. 'Saint Mary Major'
- Church of St Mary the Great, Cambridge, UK; an Anglican church
- "Mary Major" (pseudonym), an anonymous name, a variant of John Doe
- Kathryn Mary Major (politician), a UK politician who ran in the 2011 Erewash Borough Council election
- Saint Mary of the Snows (disambiguation)
- Saint Mary (disambiguation)
