= Ismay Jail =

- U.S. National Register of Historic Places
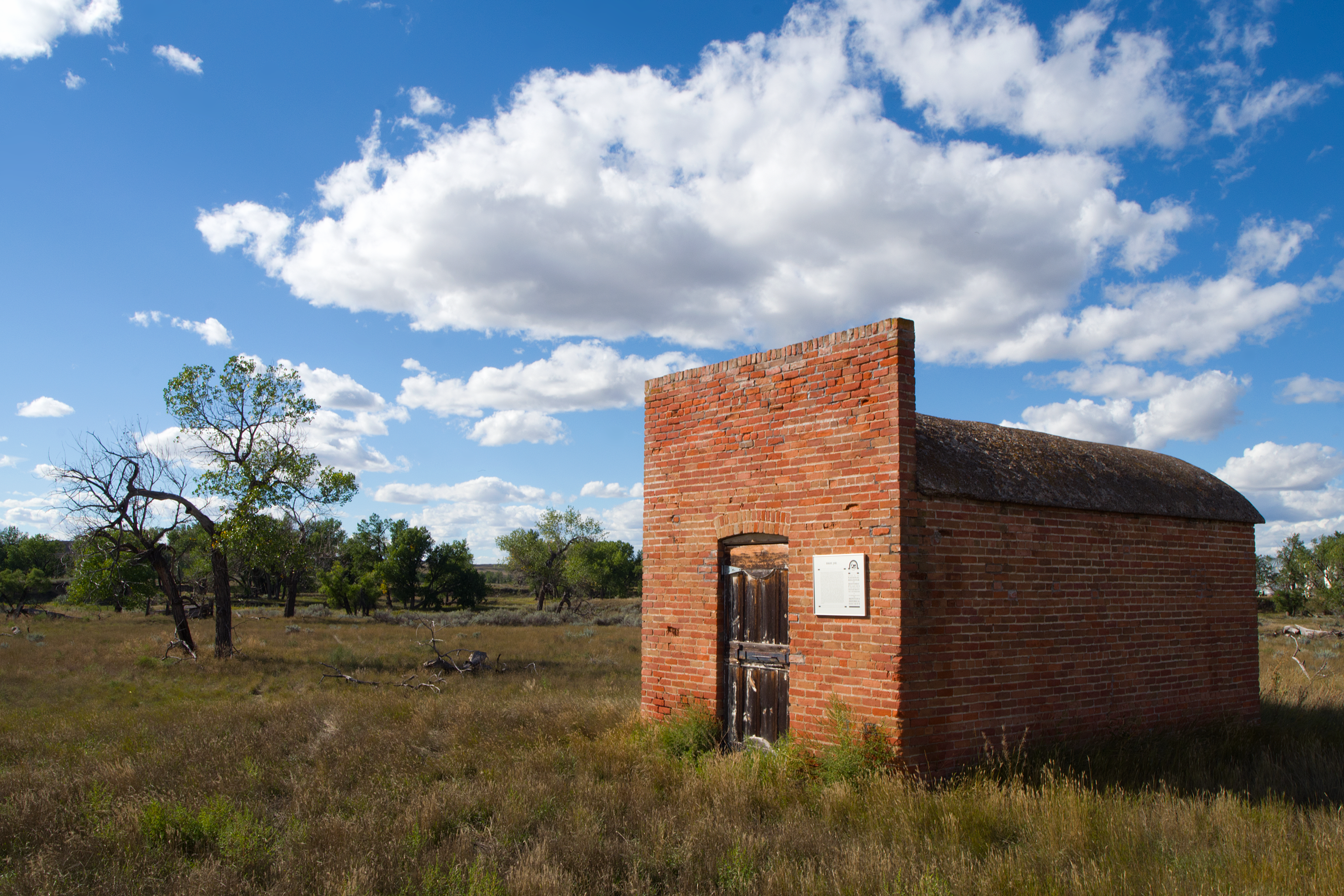

- Location within Montana Location within the United States
- Location: Jailhouse Rd., west of junction with East St., Ismay, Montana
- Coordinates: 46°29′53″N 104°47′34″W
- Area: less than one acre
- Built: 1909
- Built by: Perham, W.T.
- Architectural style: square block jail
- NRHP reference No.: 97000501
- Added to NRHP: June 4, 1997

The Ismay Jail is a National Registered Historic Place located in Ismay, Montana. It was added to the Register on June 4, 1997.

It is a small jail which was built in 1909. It is built of red brick on a concrete slab, and it has a barrel form concrete roof. Its false front rises to 12 feet 8 inches; it has a 20 feet (6.1 m) by 12 feet (3.7 m) plan. It has one 26 by 18 inches (0.66 m × 0.46 m) window on each of its west and north sides.
