= Neige =

Neige (French pronunciation: [nɛʒ], meaning snow) may refer to:

== People ==
- Neige (musician), a French singer, songwriter and musician, leader of band Alcest

== Geography ==
- Lac des Neiges, a waterbody in Lac-Jacques-Cartier, Quebec, Canada
- Piton des Neiges, a shield volcano on Réunion
- Rivière des Neiges, a tributary of the Montmorency River in Lac-Jacques-Cartier, Quebec, Canada

== Other uses ==
- Grand Secretariat (Chinese: 內閣; pinyin: Nèigé), the highest bureaucratic institution in the Ming and Qing dynasty government
- Neige (Black Clover), a character in the manga series Black Clover
- Neige, a character in the video game Mega Man Zero 4
- Neige (film), a 1981 French film

== See also ==
- Niege Dias, a former Brazilian international tennis player
