= Labro, Lazio =

Labro
- Comune
- Comune di Labro
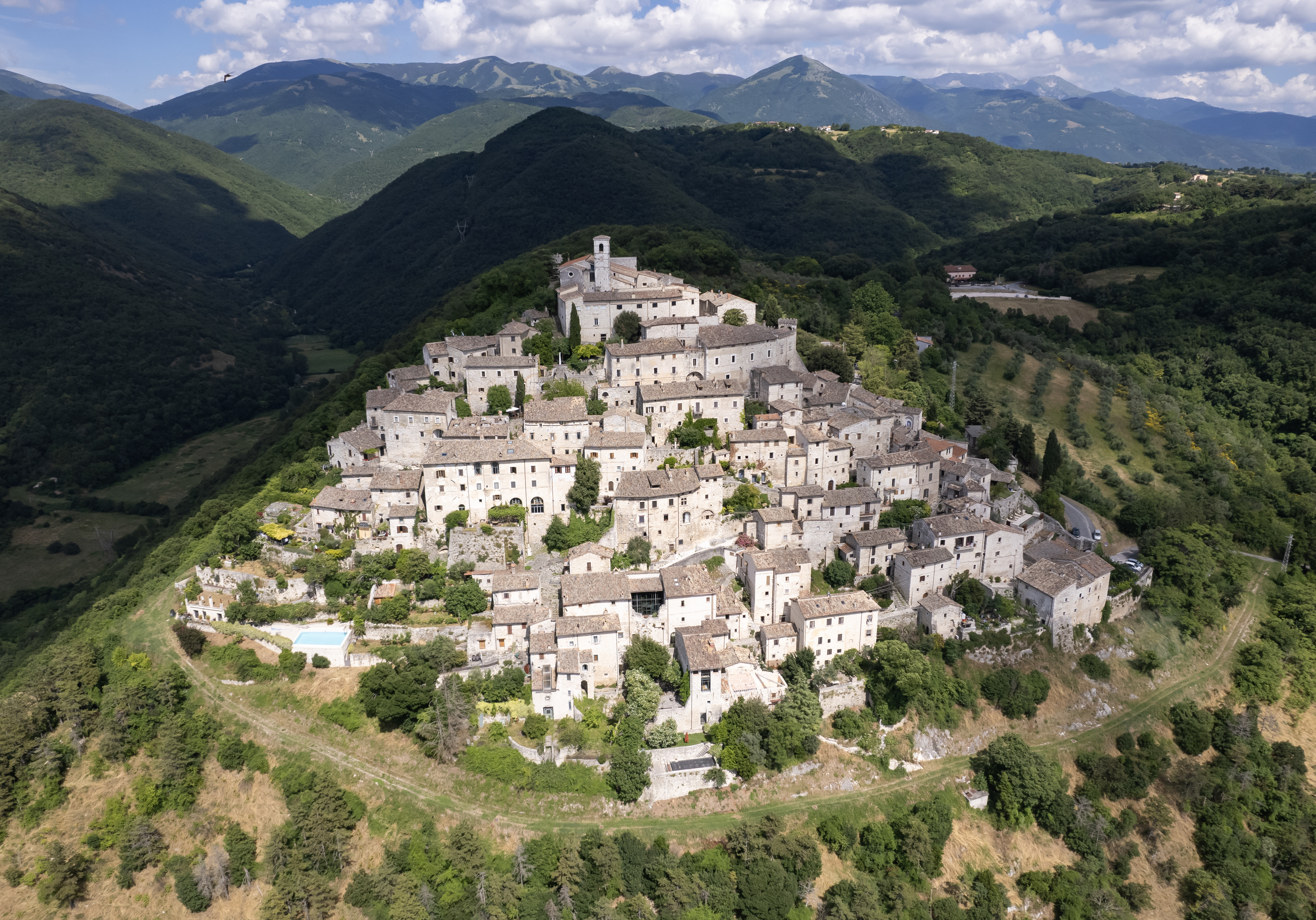
- View of Labro

- Location within Italy Location within Lazio
- Coordinates: 42°32′N 12°48′E
- Country: Italy
- Region: Lazio
- Province: Province of Rieti (RI)

Area
  - Total: 11.4 km^{2} (4.4 sq mi)
- Elevation: 628 m (2,060 ft)

Population (Dec. 2004)
  - Total: 374
  - Density: 32.8/km^{2} (85.0/sq mi)
- Time zone: UTC+1 (CET)
  - Summer (DST): UTC+2 (CEST)
- Postal code: 02010
- Dialing code: 0746

Labro is a comune (municipality) in the Province of Rieti in the Italian region of Latium, located about 70 kilometres (43 mi) northeast of Rome and about 15 kilometres (9 mi) northwest of Rieti. It is a touristic destination and has been awarded with the orange flag.

As of 31 December 2004, it had a population of 374 and an area of 11.4 square kilometres (4.4 mi^{2}). Labro borders the following municipalities: Arrone, Colli sul Velino, Morro Reatino, Terni.

== History ==
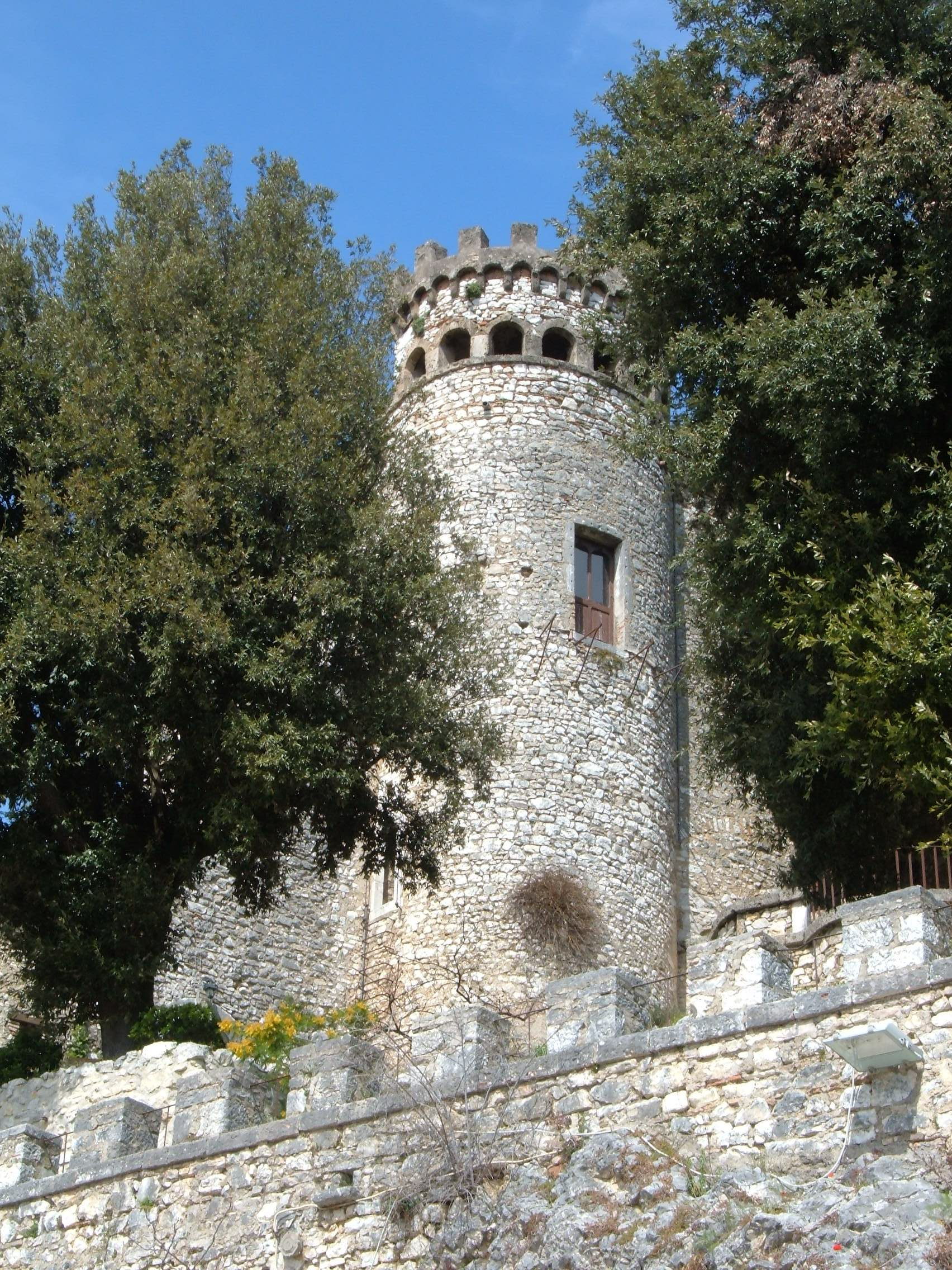
A tower of Labro's Nobili-Vitelleschi castle

Labro was founded between the 9th and 10th century; the first lord of Labro was sworn by Otto I in the year 956. During the Middle Ages, Labro was a possession of the city of Rieti and served as a stronghold to secure the border with the city of Spoleto. For this reason, Labro was involved in a number of battles, in particular with the bordering castle of Luco which was controlled by Spoleto.

After the Second World War, Labro suffered a strong depopulation, which endangered the very survival of the town. To fight the phenomenon and encourage tourism, starting from 1968, the heirs of the Nobili family decided to fully restore all the buildings in the village; the task was carried on by Flemish architect Ivan Van Mossevelde.

== Main sights ==
Labro hosts the 16th century Nobili-Vitelleschi castle.

Among the churches in town is the parish church of Santa Maria Maggiore.

There is an ex-Francescan monastery located in Labro that is run by the Colle di Costa hotel. From April 2010 to August 2013, the hotel shared the space with the Art Monastery Project, an international arts production organization that animated the town with regular performances and exhibitions.

== Demographic evolution ==
Historical population

Year	Pop.	±%
1861	551	—
1871	623	+13.1%
1881	641	+2.9%
1901	735	+14.7%
1911	711	−3.3%

Year	Pop.	±%
1921	718	+1.0%
1931	813	+13.2%
1936	800	−1.6%
1951	725	−9.4%
1961	558	−23.0%

Year	Pop.	±%
1971	382	−31.5%
1981	340	−11.0%
1991	293	−13.8%
2001	352	+20.1%

Source: Data from ISTAT

== Transport ==
Labro has a station on the Terni–Sulmona railway, with trains to Terni, Rieti and L'Aquila.
