= Santa Maria Maggiore, Miglionico =

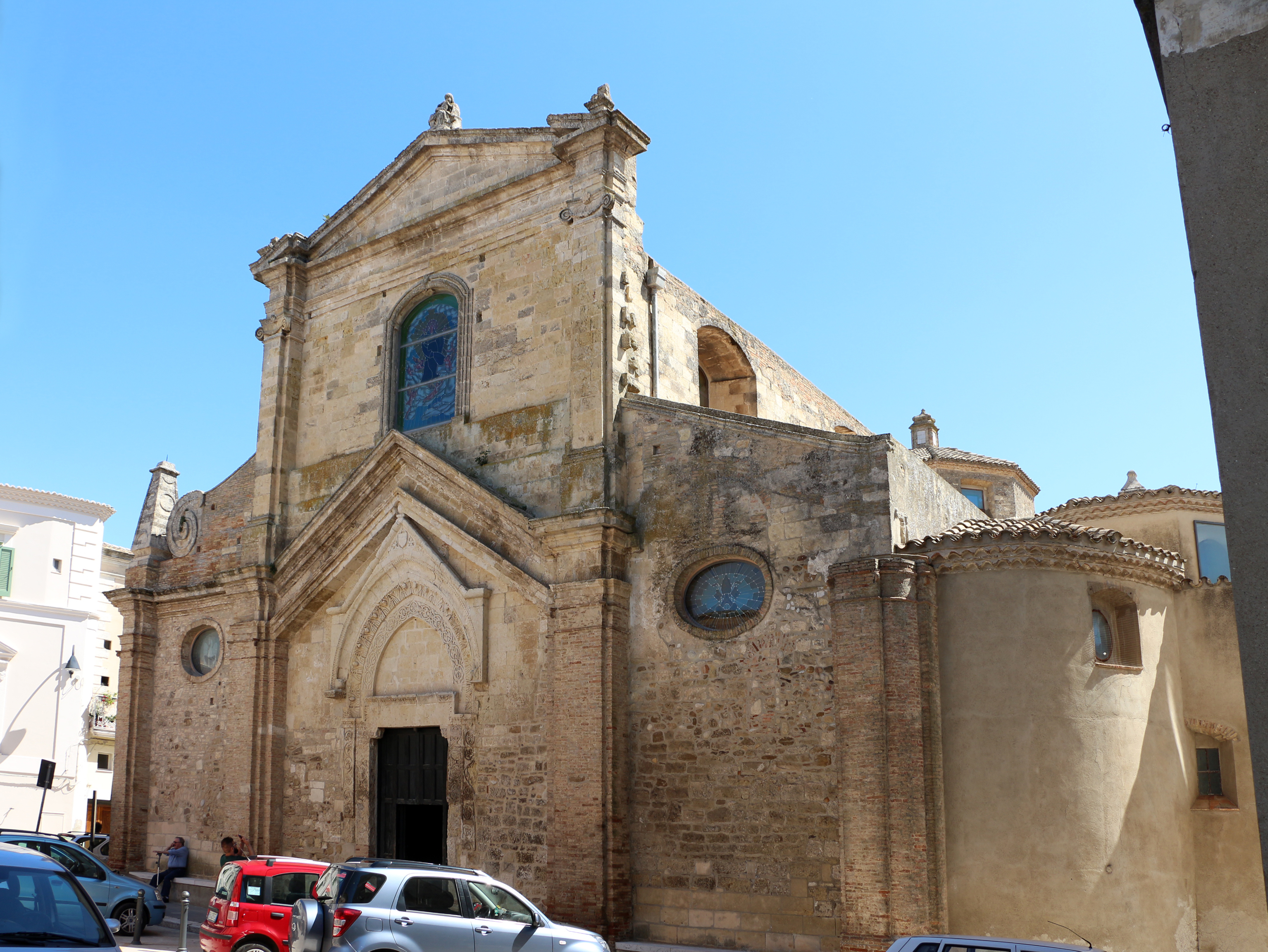
Miglionico, s.m. maggiore (chiesa madre), esterno 02.jpg

Santa Maria Maggiore, also known as the church of San Francesco, is a Roman Catholic church in the town of Miglionico, province of Matera, Basilicata, Italy.

The church with its romanesque belltower, is attached to a small Franciscan convent. The church is mainly notable for housing the Polyptych of Miglionico, a large 18 panel masterpiece painted by Cima da Conegliano in 1499. The work was purchased by the local bishop in 1598, and installed in this chapel in the 18th century.
