= Santa Maria Maggiore, Labro =

Roman Catholic church in Lazio, Italy

Coordinates: 42°31′34.0″N 12°48′03.1″E

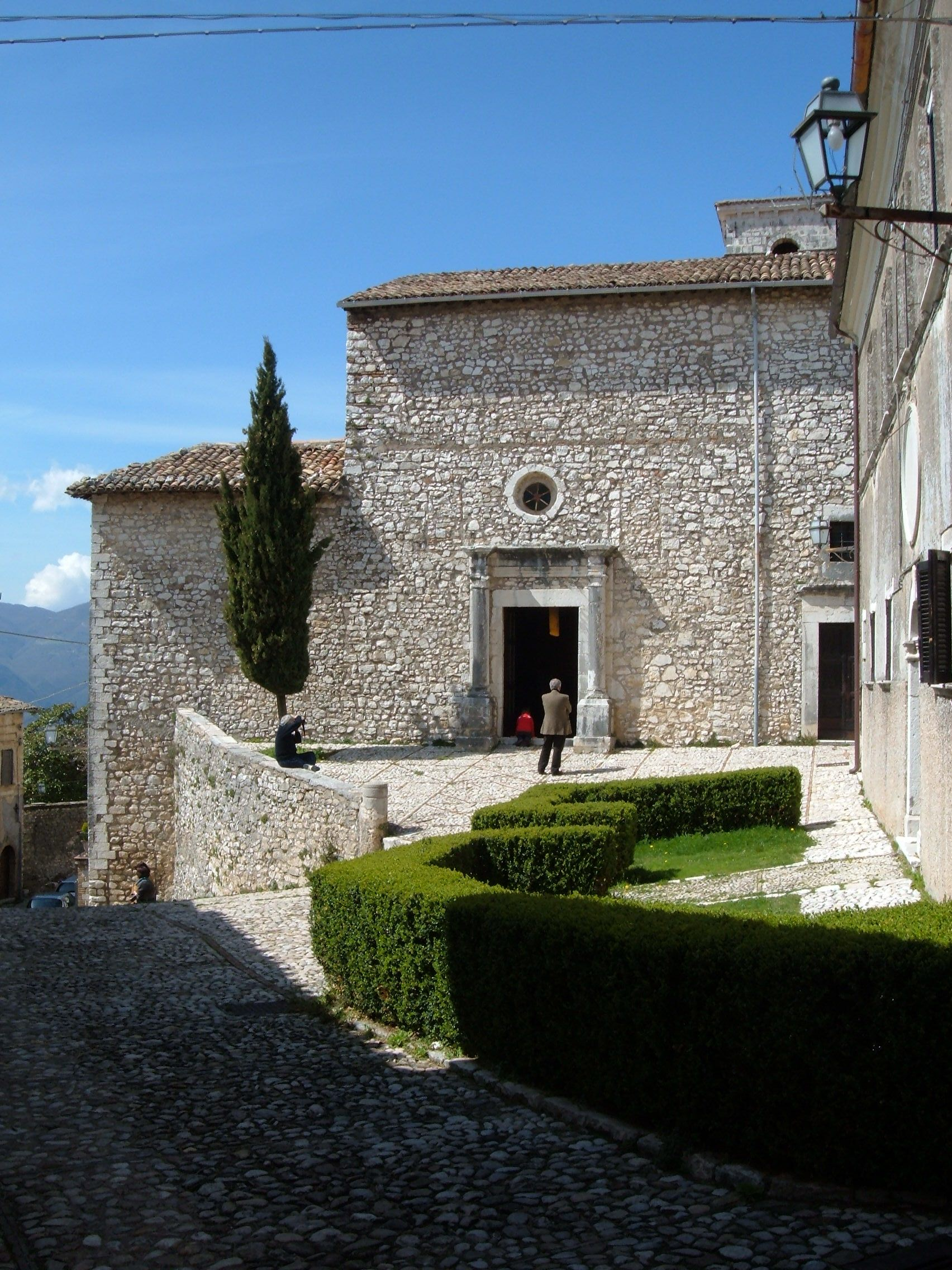
Facade of church

Santa Maria Maggiore is a Roman Catholic church located in the town of Labro, in the province of Rieti, region of Lazio, Italy.

== History ==
A church at the site has been documented since 1398. At the end of the 15th century, at the site of a castle tower, a church and chapel were built at this site. The baptistry and bell tower are somewhat separate from the church. In 1508, the church was elevated to collegiate church by Cardinal Giovanni Colonna, bishop of Rieti. While the exterior is simple, made of irregular stones with a central oculus, two filled in windows, and with a portal flanked by doric pilasters; the interior is notable for Gothic tracery in the arches. The ceilings are painted with a starry sky. There are frescoes from the 16th century Umbrian school depicting an Annunciation.
