= Church of Saint-Jean de Montierneuf =

Roman Catholic church in Poitiers, France

Coordinates: 46°35′21″N 0°20′43″E

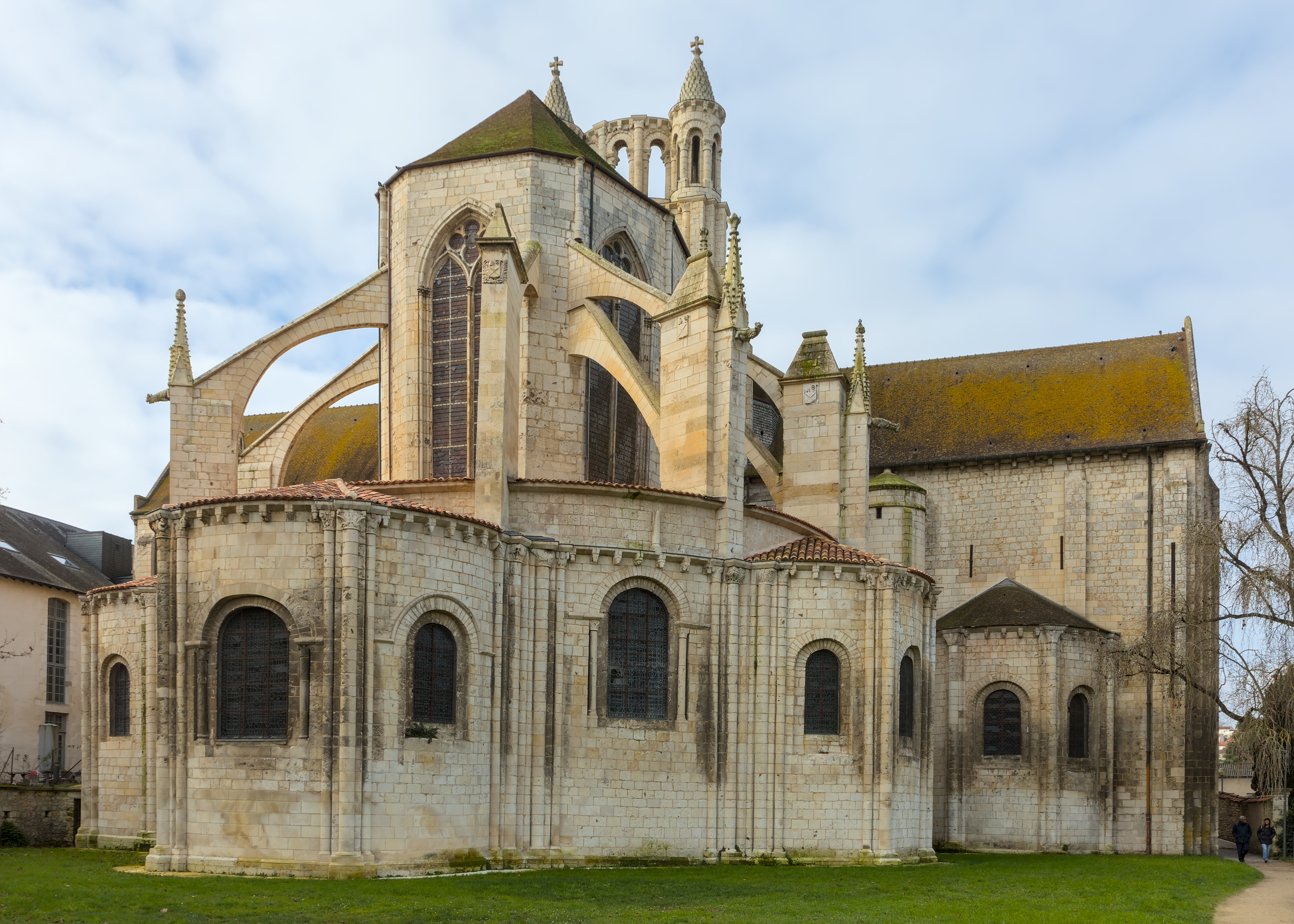
Chevet of Saint-Jean de Montierneuf

The Church of Saint-Jean de Montierneuf is a Roman Catholic church in Poitiers, France.

The church was built in the 11th century and is notable for its Romanesque architecture.

It has been listed as a Monument historique since 1840.

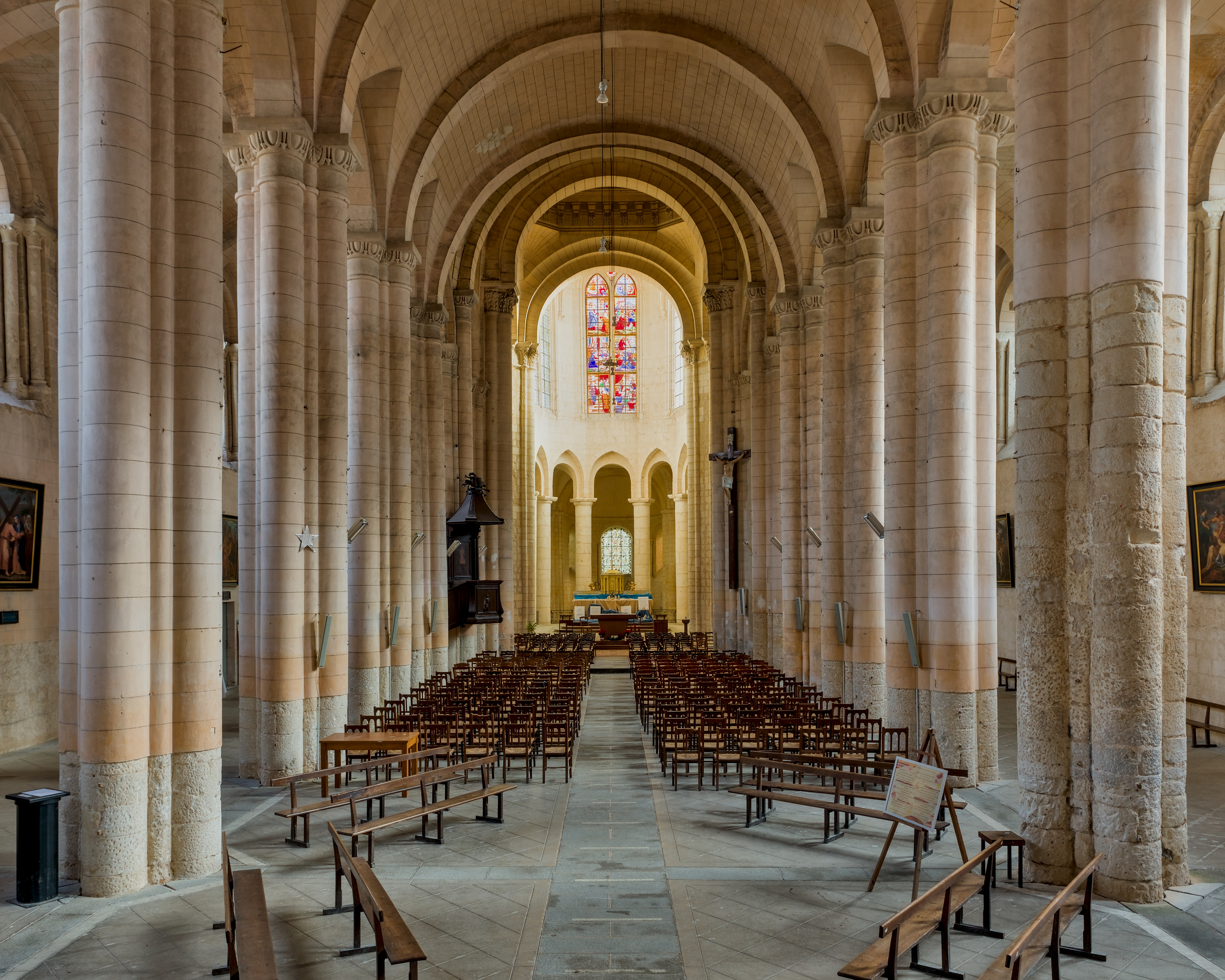
The interior

== See also ==
- High medieval domes
