= Villanueva de Gómez =

- municipality
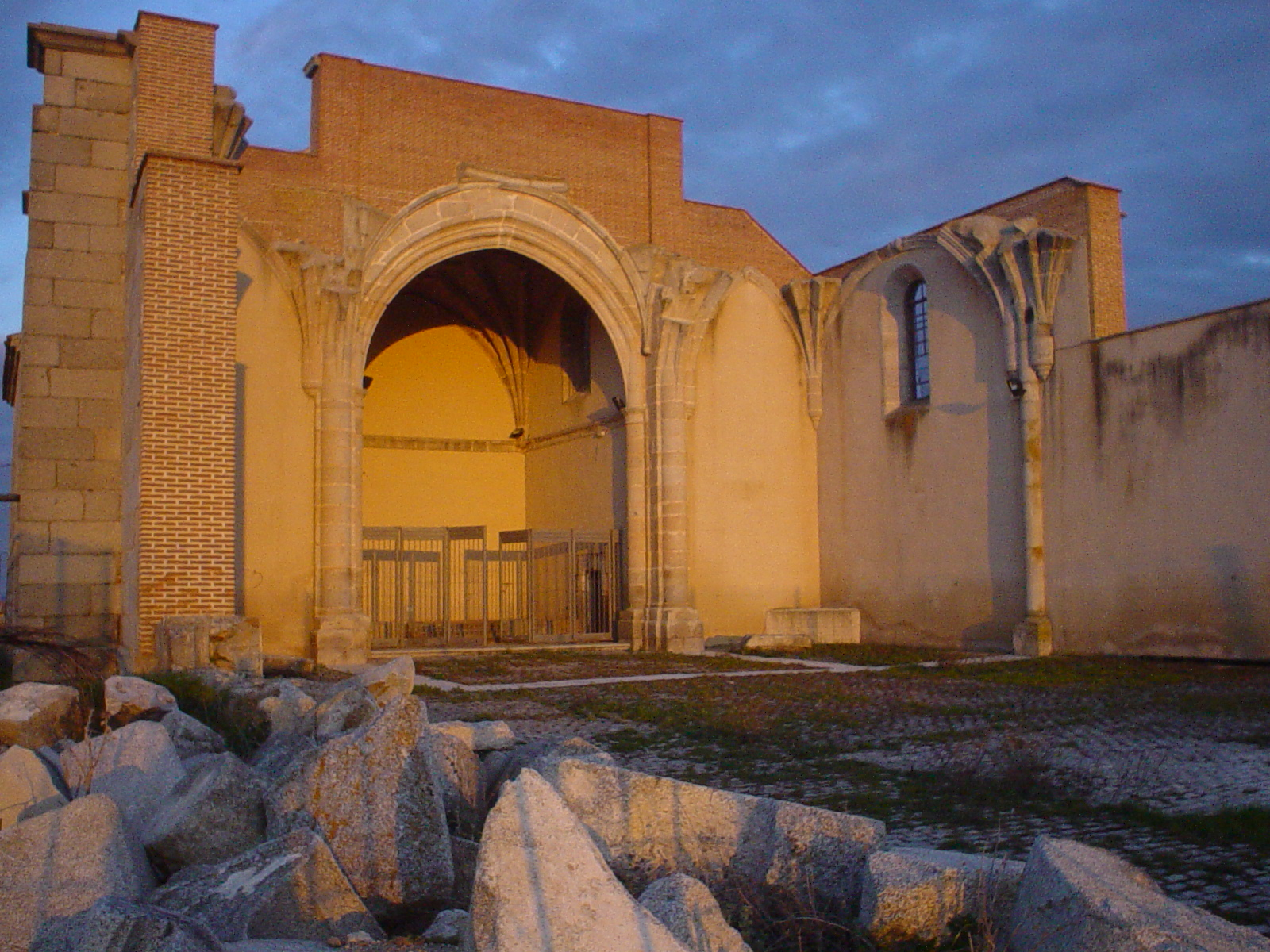
- Ruins of the Santa María la Mayor Church

- Flag Coat of arms

- Location in Spain. Villanueva de Gómez (Spain)
- Coordinates: 40°53′02″N 4°42′55″W
- Country: Spain
- Autonomous community: Castile and León
- Province: Ávila
- Municipality: Villanueva de Gómez

Area
  - Total: 21 km^{2} (8.1 sq mi)

Population (2025-01-01)
  - Total: 119
  - Density: 5.7/km^{2} (15/sq mi)
- Time zone: UTC+1 (CET)
  - Summer (DST): UTC+2 (CEST)
- Website: Official website

Villanueva de Gómez is a municipality located in the province of Ávila, Castile and León, Spain.

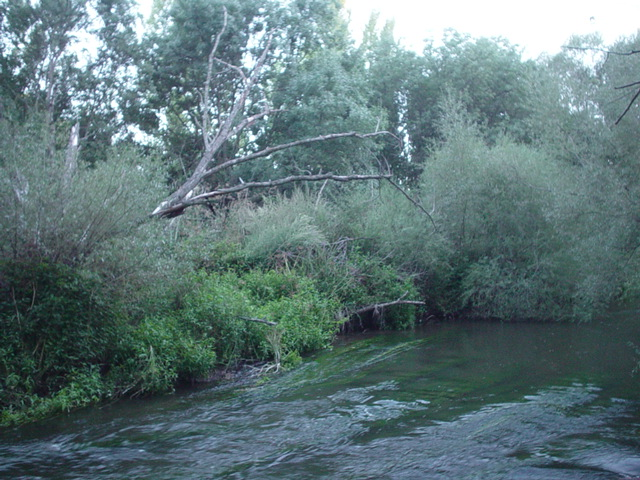
The Adaja River for Villanueva de Gómez.

== Population ==
Historical population
Year	Pop.	±% p.a.
2023	115	—
2024	115	+0.00%
2025	119	+3.48%
Source: INE
