= Labro Meadows Nature Reserve =

Nature reserve in Södermanland, Sweden

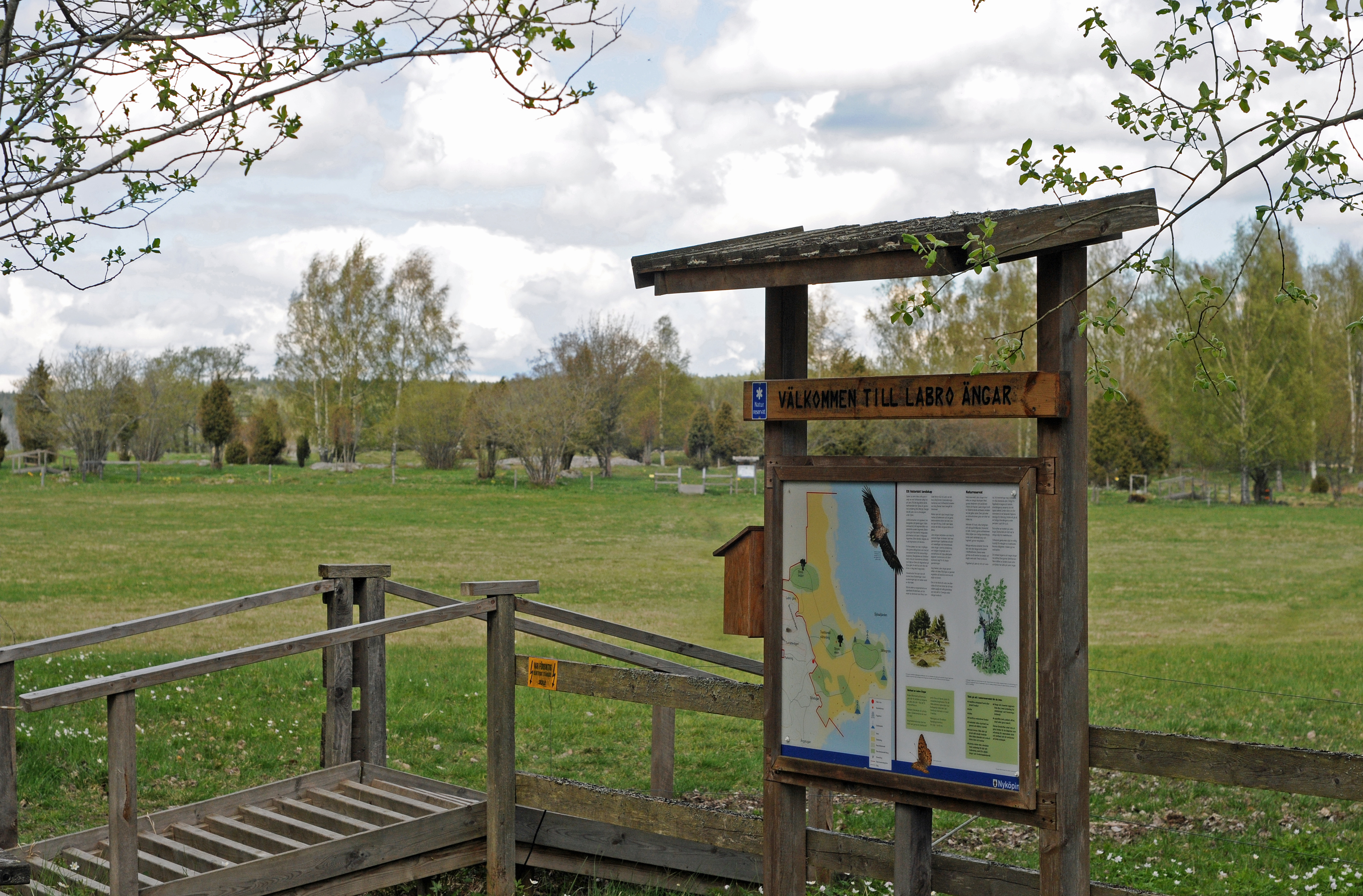

- Location within Södermanland
- Location: Sweden
- Nearest city: Nyköping
- Coordinates: 58°45′18″N 17°05′00″E
- Area: 152.9 ha (378 acres)
- Established: 2003

Labro Meadows Nature Reserve (Swedish: Labro ängar naturreservat) is a nature reserve in Södermanland County in Sweden. It is part of the EU-wide Natura 2000-network.

The nature reserve covers a gently hilly area with meadows and pastures, disused arable land and small hills overgrown with forest. In the eastern part of the nature reserve lies an observation tower for birdwatching. Several paths and information boards also exist within the reserve. The bird-life of the area is rich, with around 190 species observed in the area, out of which approximately 70 regularly breed within the nature reserve. The species include northern lapwing, common redshank and western yellow wagtail. From the flora, field gentian, globeflower, birds-eye primrose and catsfoot can be mentioned.
