= Notre-Dame des Neiges, L'Alpe d'Huez =

Church of Notre-Dame des Neiges
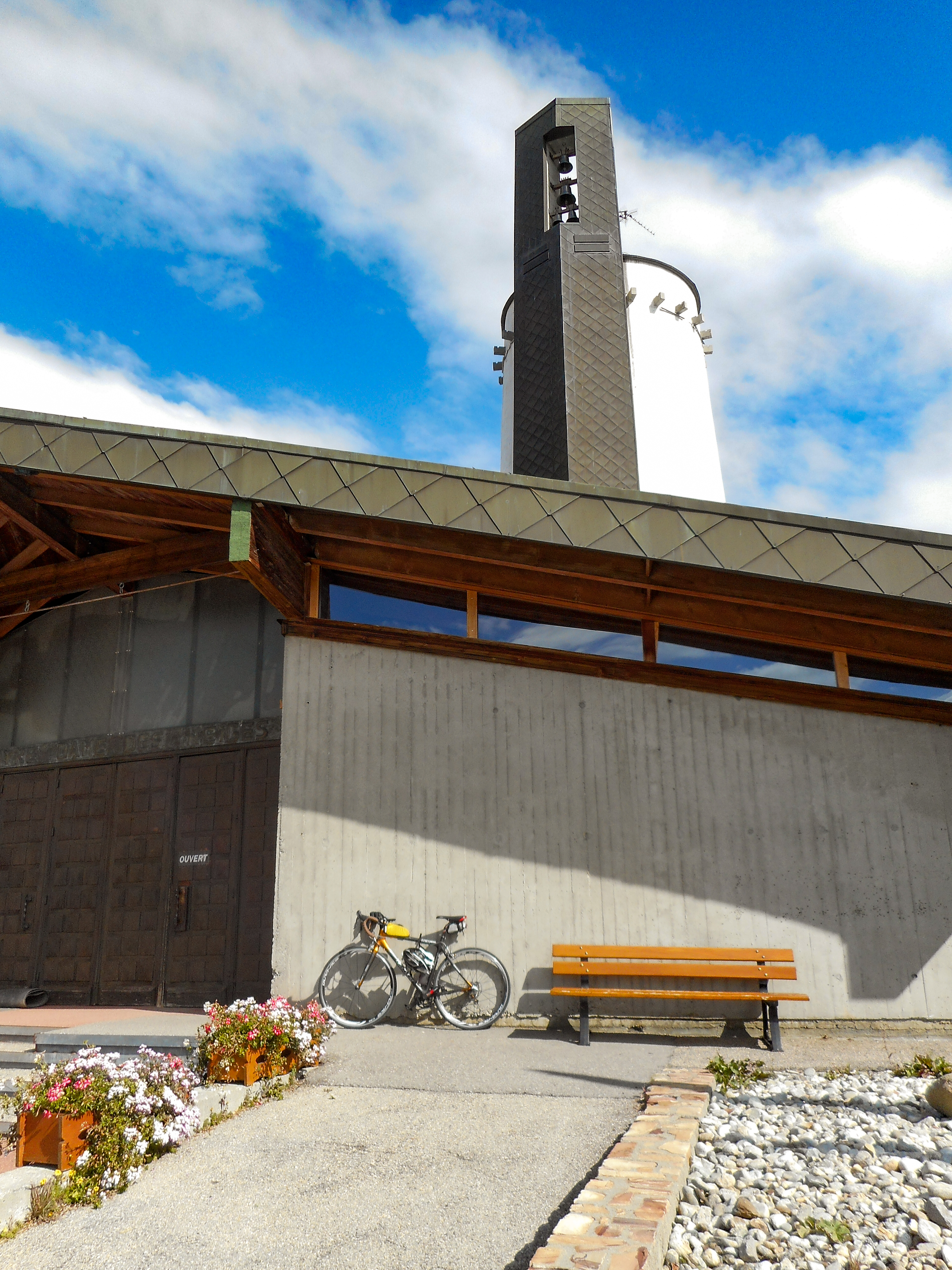
- Exterior of the church

- Location within France

Religion
- Affiliation: Roman Catholic Church
- Province: Archdiocese of Lyon
- Region: Rhône-Alpes
- Rite: Roman Rite
- Status: Active

Location
- State: France
- Coordinates: 45.089600°N 6.068760°E

Architecture
- Architect: Jean Marol
- Style: Modern
- Groundbreaking: 1968
- Completed: 1970

Website
- Association website

Notre-Dame des Neiges French pronunciation: [nɔtʁə dam de nɛʒ], "Our Lady of the Snows") is a church in the municipality of Alpe d'Huez, built in the twentieth century and dedicated to the Virgin Mary.

== History ==
A small chapel, built in 1940, situated in the center of the Alpe d'Huez, was initially dedicated to the Marian cult. In 1960, the priest, Jaap Reuten, asked Jean Le Boucher and architect Jean Marol to build a church-shaped tent, representing Abraham, the first Biblical patriarch, to replace the chapel with a structure visible from the Meije, in preparation for the Olympic Games of 1968.

Stained glass windows surround the nave, oval, representing the life of Jesus Christ according to the Gospel of Mark, made by the artist Arcabas. The church holds a crypt dedicated to St Nicolas and in the choir, there is a pipe organ, whose organ case is in the shape of hand. The instrument was designed by the composer Jean Guillou, and built by the German organ builder Detlef Kleuker.

The church depends on the parish of St. Bernard en Oisans and the Diocese of Grenoble-Vienne. It is managed administratively and culturally by the Association of Our Lady of the Snows.

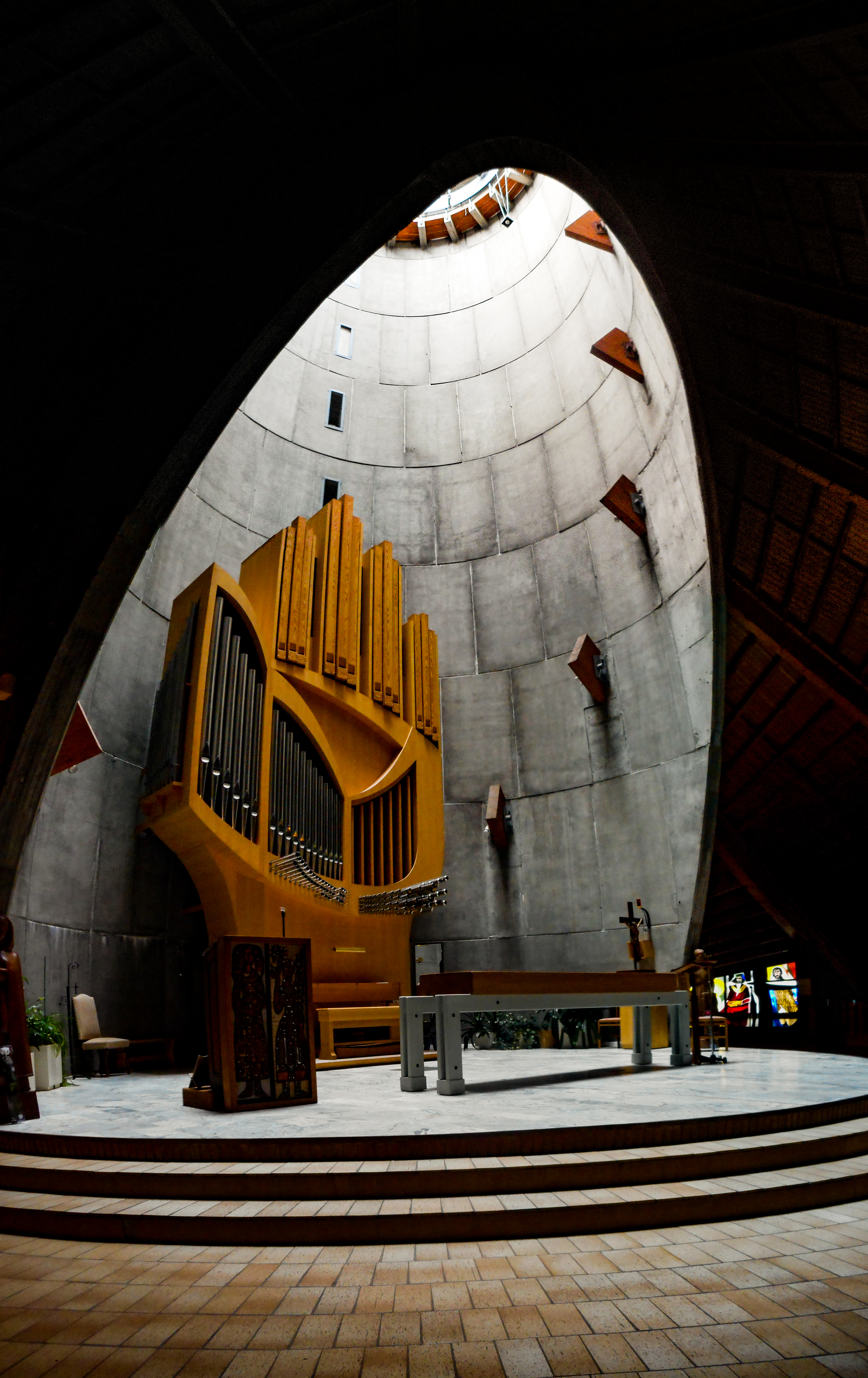
The church organ
