= Saint Mary of the Snows =

Saint Mary of the Snows, also Our Lady of the Snows, may refer to:

== Dedication ==
- Dedication of the Basilica of St Mary Major, a liturgical feast day previously known in Latin as Dedicatio Sanctæ Mariæ ad Nives, translating as "Dedication of the Church of Our Lady of the Snows", in 1969

== Buildings ==
=== Churches ===
- Cathedral Basilica of Our Lady of the Snows, João Pessoa, Brazil
- Cathedral of Our Lady of the Snows (Nuoro Cathedral), Nuoro, Sardinia, Italy
- Chapel of Our Lady of the Snows (Belgrano II Base), Argentine Antarctica
- Chapel of Our Lady of the Snows (Ilha de Maré), Brazil
- St. Mary on the Snow, a church in the historical city center of Prague, Czech Republic
- A neoclassical chapel of Our Lady of the Snows in Prior Park College, Bath, England
- Notre-Dame des Neiges, L'Alpe d'Huez, Huez, France
- Notre-Dame-des-Neiges de Kerbader, Fouesnant, France
- Santa Maria Maggiore, Rome, Italy; also called "Our Lady of the Snows"
- Church of Maria Santissima della Neve, Lercara Friddi, Sicily, Italy
- Our Lady of the Snows, Quarantoli, Modena, Italy
- Knisja tal-Madonna tas-Silġ, near the nearby ancient site of Tas-Silġ, Malta
- Our Lady of the Snows Parish, El Salvador, Misamis Oriental, Philippines
- Our Lady of the Snows convent church in Przeworsk, Poland
- Saint Mary of the Snows Church, Reșița, Caraş-Severin, Romania
- Our Lady of Snows, Masaka, Uganda
- Our Lady of the Snows Parish, Dumarao, Capiz, Philippines
- Saint Mary of the Snows, Mansfield, Ohio, United States
- Our Lady of the Snows, Clarks Summit, PA, Diocese of Scranton, United States of America
- Our Lady of Snows Church, Raia, Goa, India

=== Schools ===
- Our Lady of the Snows, in Methven, New Zealand
- Our Lady of the Snows School, a school in the Roman Catholic Archdiocese of Chicago, Illinois, US
- St. Mary of the Snow (school), in Saugerties, New York, US

=== Basilicas ===
- Basilica of Our Lady of the Snows, Iguape, Brazil
- Basilica of Our Lady of Snows, Pallippuram, Ernakulam, India
- Basilica of Our Lady of Snows, Thoothukudi, Tamil Nadu, India

=== Shrines ===
- Shrine of Our Lady of the Snows in Tekije, Petrovaradin, Serbia
- National Shrine of Our Lady of the Snows, Belleville, Illinois, US
- Our Lady of the Snows, a memorial at McMurdo Station, Antarctica

=== Other buildings ===
- Notre Dame des Neiges Cemetery, in Montreal, Quebec, Canada
- Abbey of Notre-Dame des Neiges, a Trappist monastery in Ardèche, France

== Other uses ==
- "Our Lady of the Snows", an 1897 poem by Rudyard Kipling, included in his 1903 collection The Five Nations
- The Spanish name María de las Nieves often shortened to Nieves and the Portuguese equivalent Neves
- The Caribbean island of Nevis

== See also ==
- Notre Dame des Neiges (disambiguation) ( French: Our Lady of the Snows )
- Saint Mary Major (disambiguation)
- Saint Mary (disambiguation)
- Mary (disambiguation)
- Snow (disambiguation)
- Lady (disambiguation)
- Pulsatilla vernalis ("lady of the snow"), an alpine plant
- Princess Marie des Neiges of Bourbon-Parma (born 1937; French: Princess Mary of the Snows) French aristocrat
- Mary Snow (1902–1978), UK botanist
- Mary McCarty Snow (1928-2021), U.S. composer
- Lady Snow, Pamela Hansford Johnson (1912–1981), UK author
- Snow woman (disambiguation)
