= Church of Notre-Dame la Grande, Poitiers =

Church in Nouvelle-Aquitaine, France

Coordinates: 46°35′00″N 0°20′38″E

Notre-Dame la Grande is a Roman Catholic church in Poitiers, France. Having a double status, collegial and parochial, it forms part of the Catholic diocese of Poitiers. The west front adorned with statuary is recognised as a masterpiece of Romanesque religious art. The walls inside the church are painted.

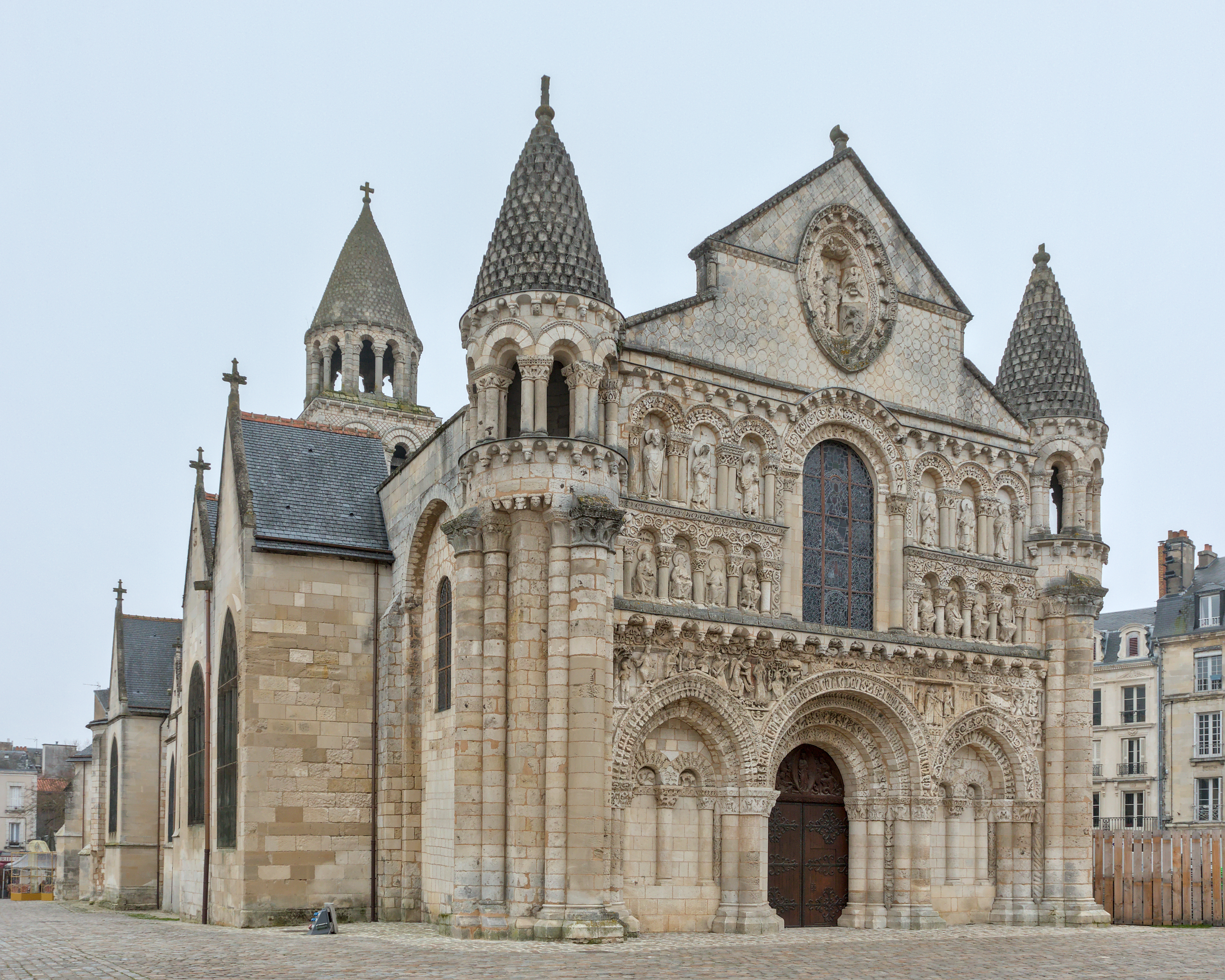
The Église Notre-Dame la Grande, from the Northwest

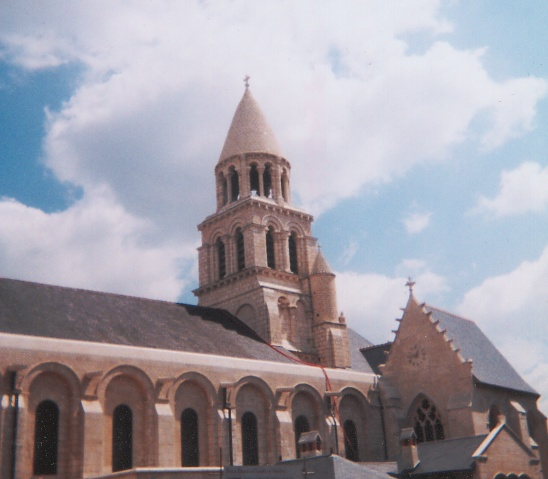
Bell tower

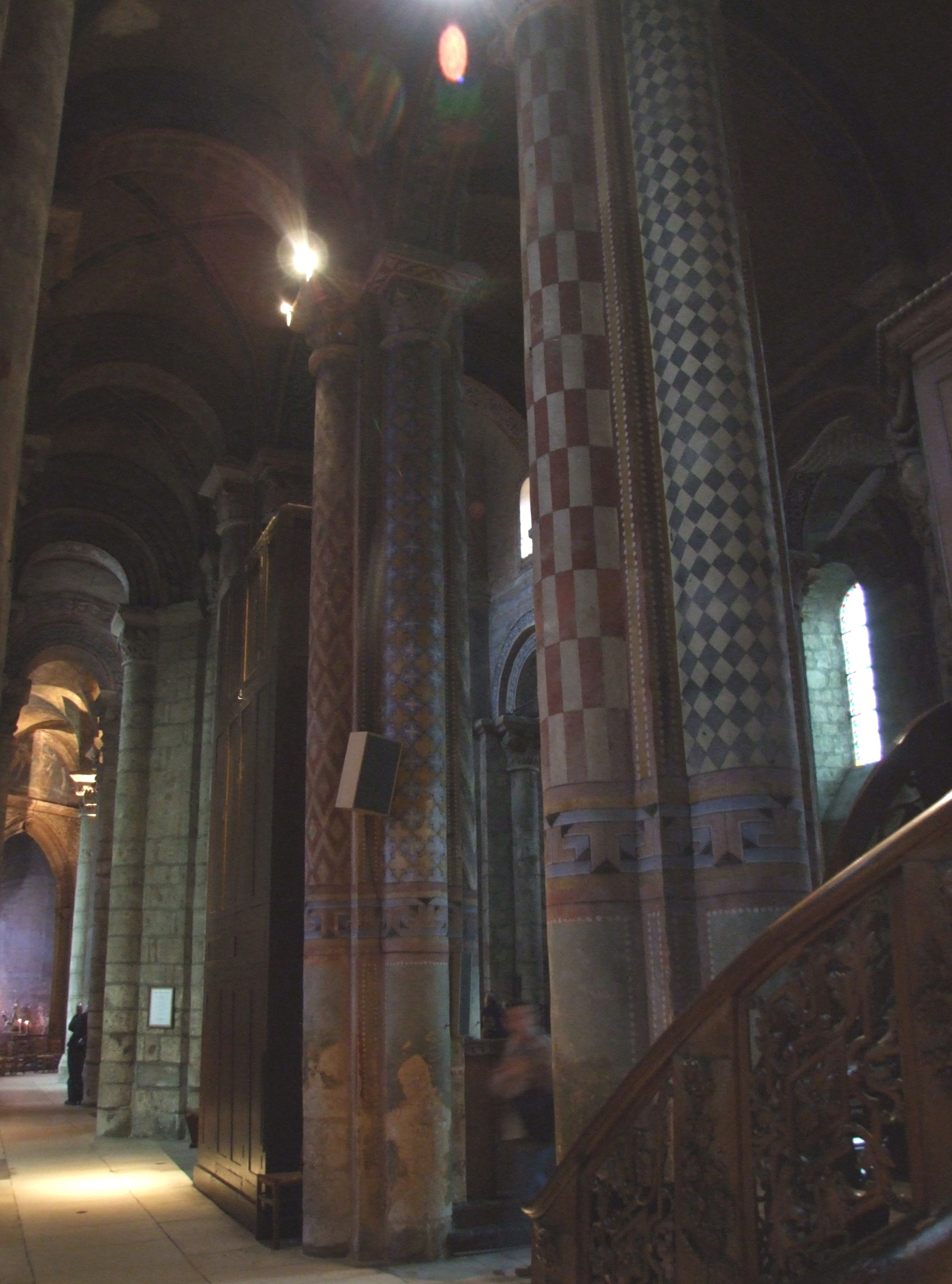
Columns in the nave

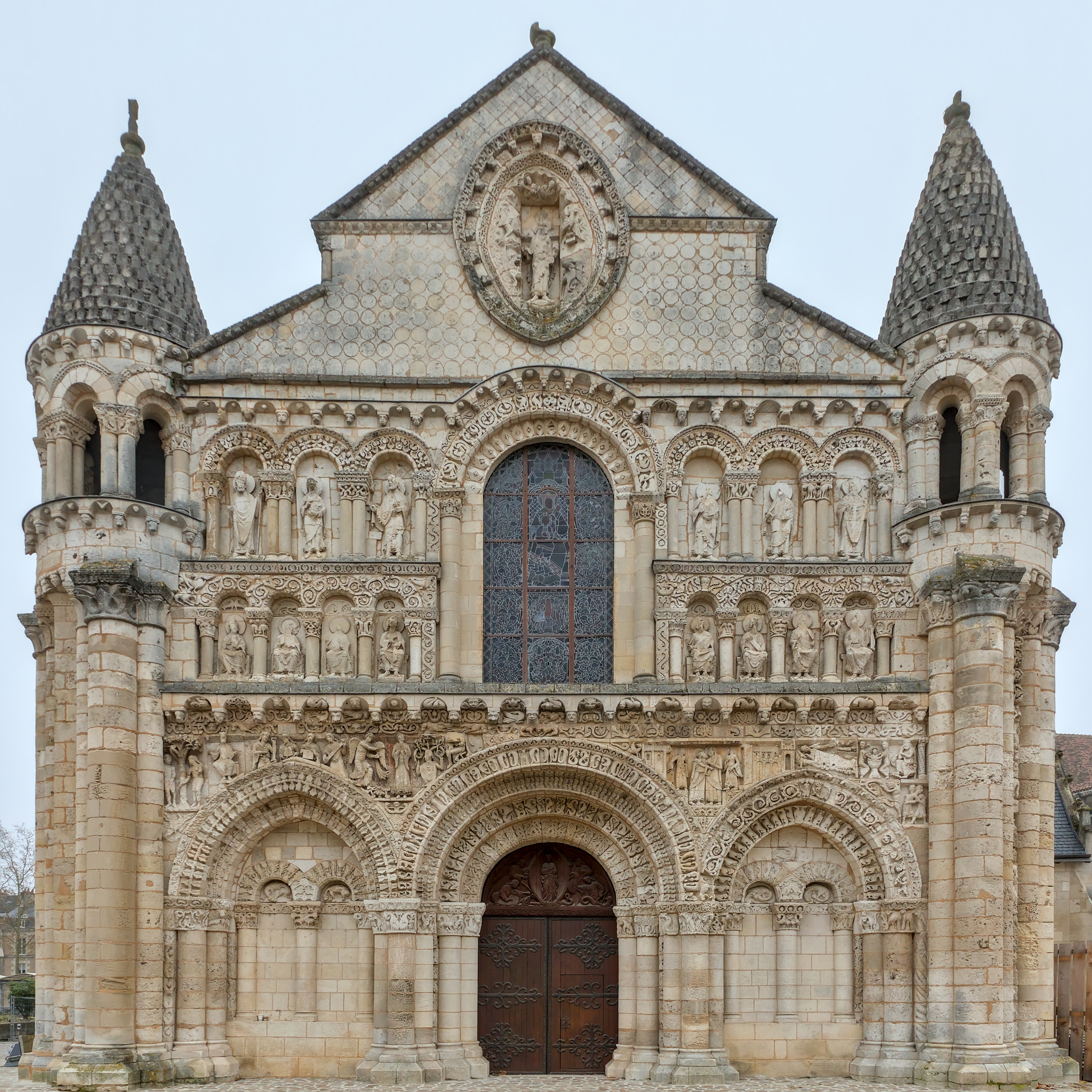
West front of Église Notre-Dame la Grande

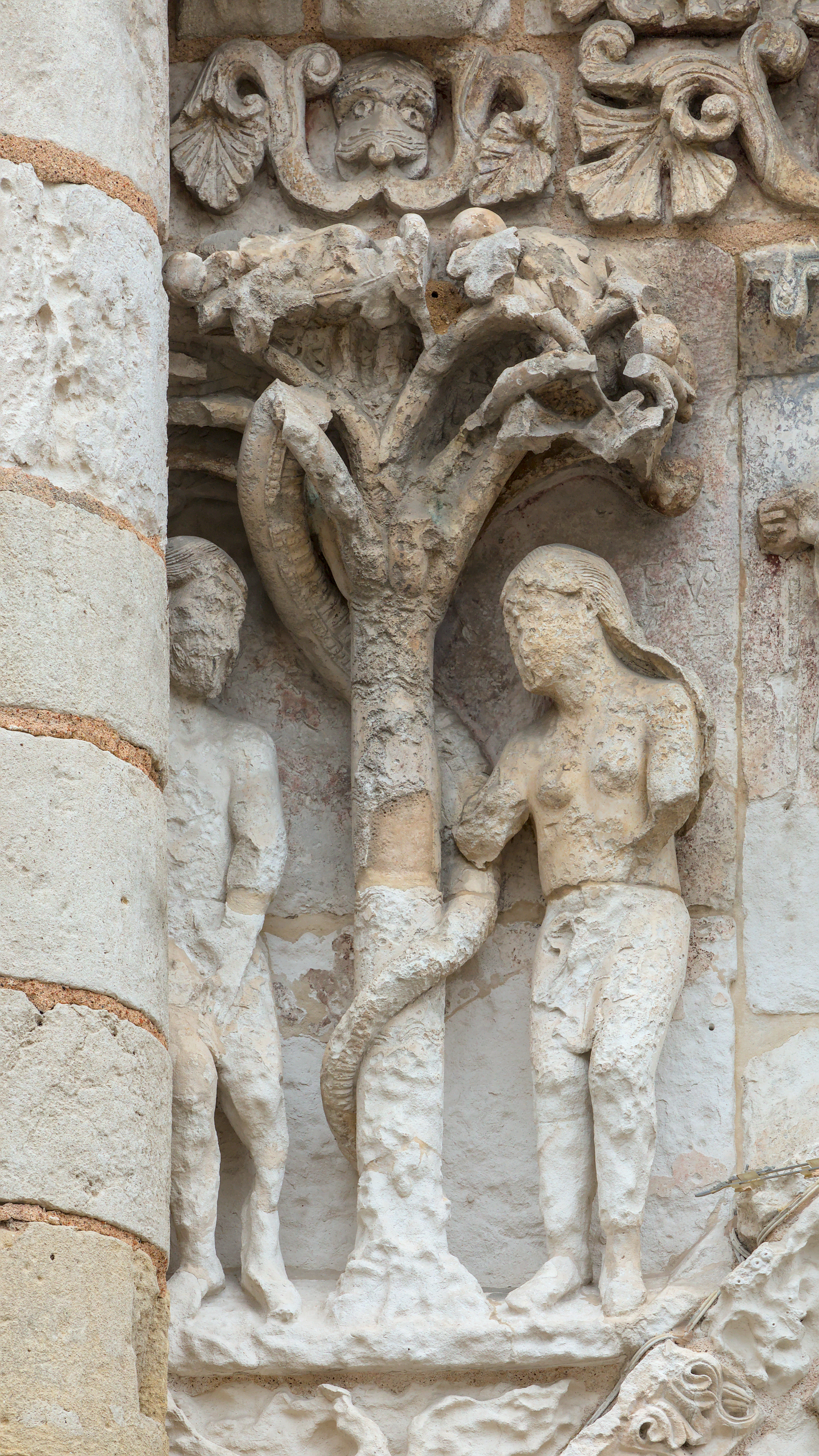
Detail of the frieze : Adam and Eve

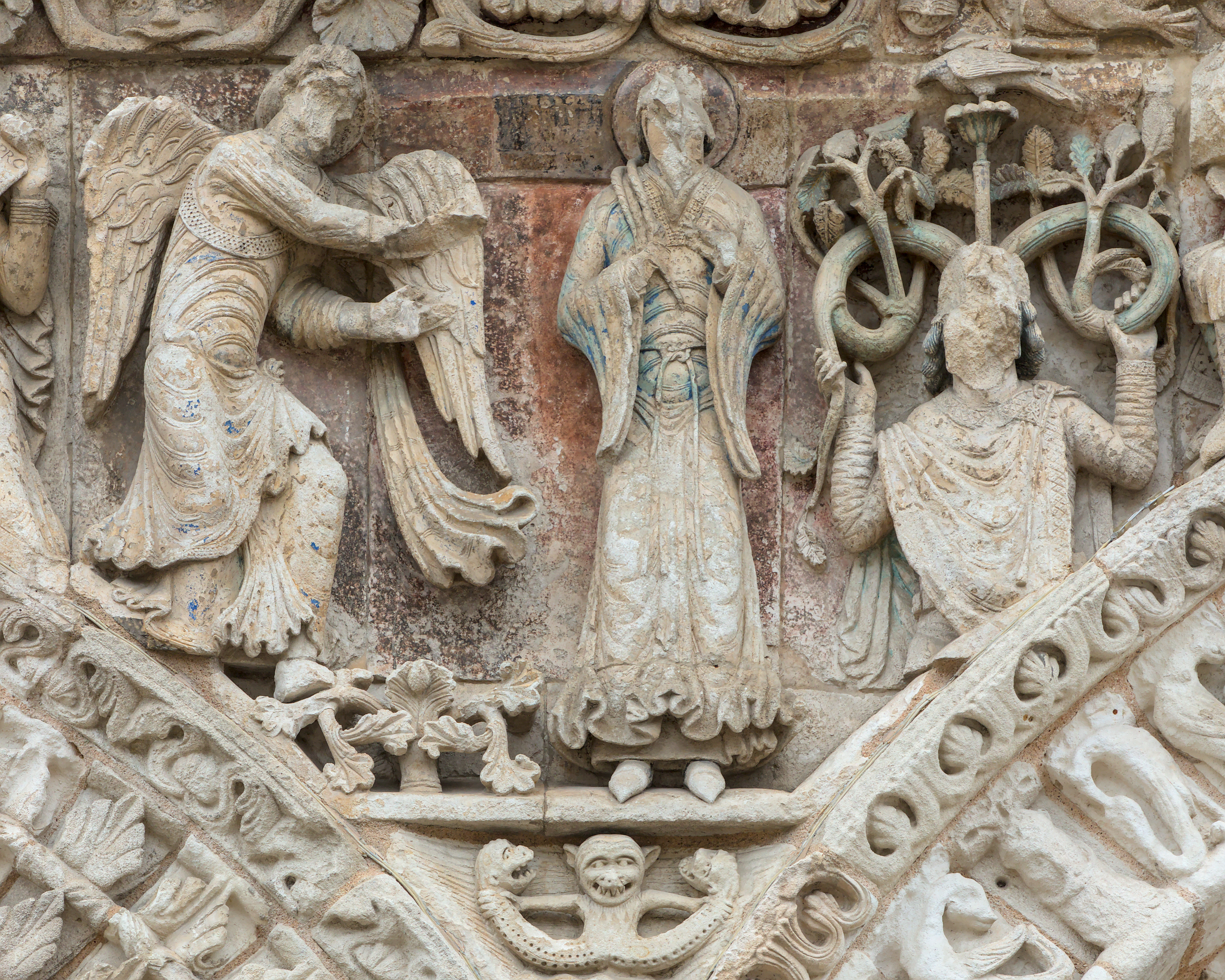
Detail of the frieze : the Annunciation and the Tree of Jesse

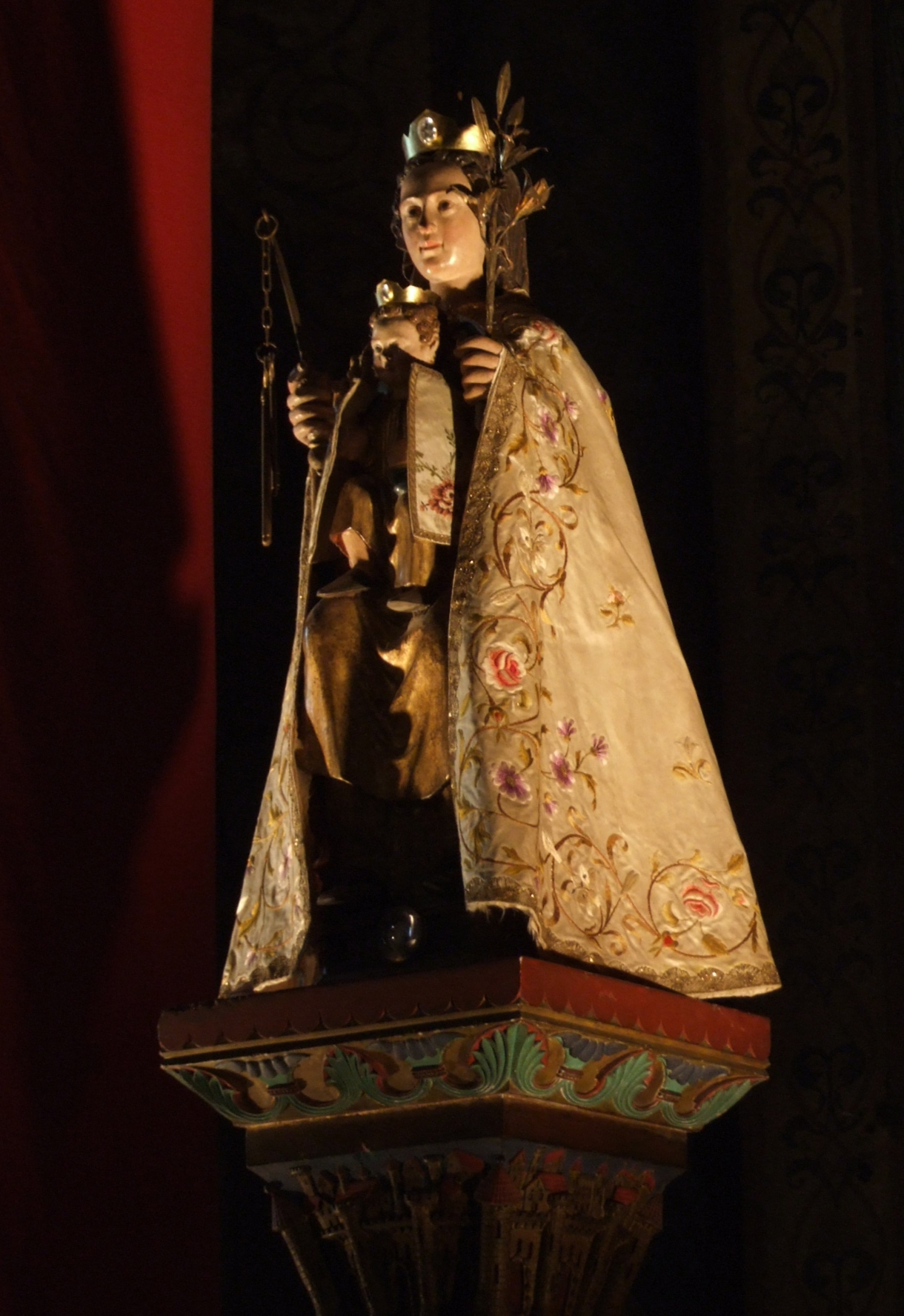
Statue of Our Lady holding the keys of the town

== History and architecture ==
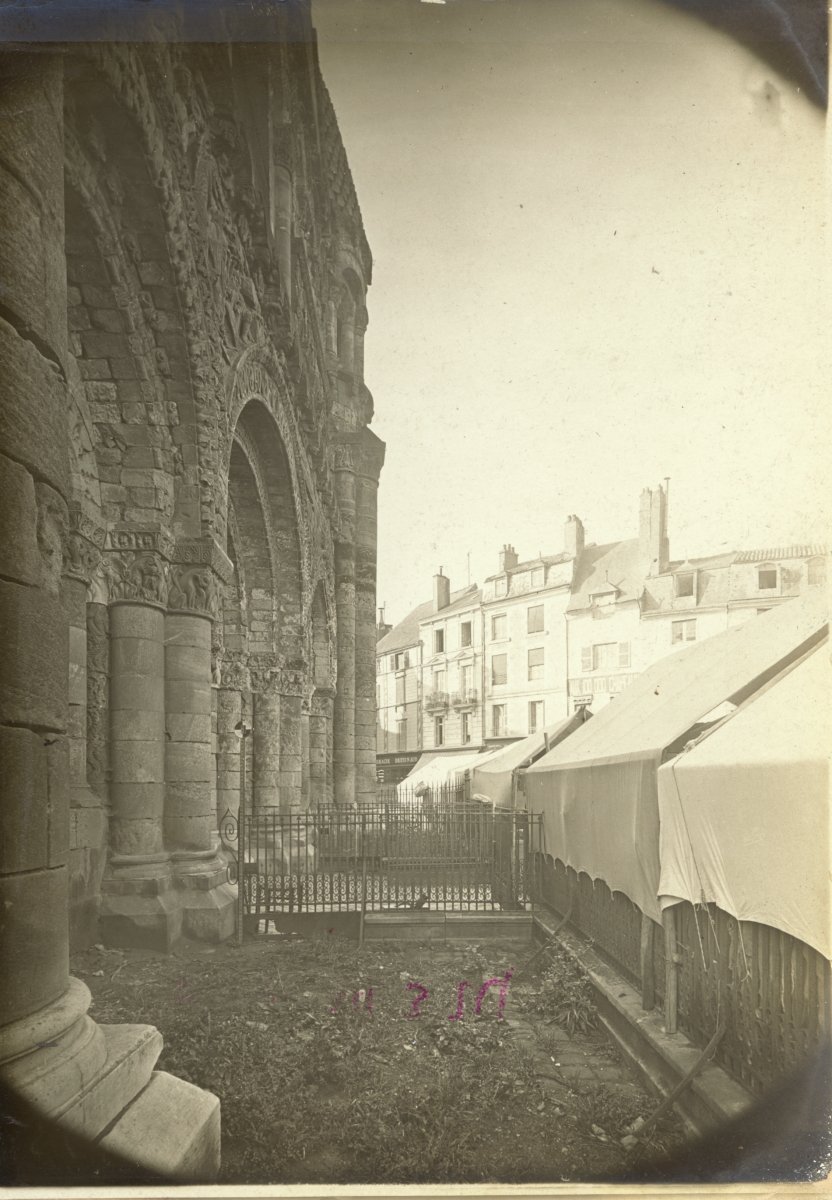
Notre Dame la Grande, Poitiers, France, 1903. Exterior.

The district was already populated in Roman times. The ancient vestiges of a brick and rectangular stone construction can be located near the gutter on the northern wall of the current church.

The church is mentioned in the 10th century, under the name of "Sancta Maria Maior", referring to the Romanesque church of the same name. Its position next to the Palace of the Counts of Poitou-Dukes of Aquitaine (current law courts of Poitiers), is certainly significant as from the political point of view, the bishops of Poitiers were barons of Poitou.

The whole of the building was rebuilt in the second half of the 11th century, in the period of High Romanesque, and inaugurated in 1086 by the future Pope Urban II.

The plan of the church is composed of a central nave with aisles according to a frequent plan in Romanesque architecture of Poitou. The interior has the effect of a "church agora" on just one plane. The barrel vault has a slightly flattened silhouette, whereas the aisles are covered with a groined vault. Outside, the aisles were covered with a terrace punt, the roof being reserved for the nave: thus there was the effect of a basilica on two levels. This silhouette disappeared with the Gothic remodelling. A deambulatory with radiating chapels developed around the church which preserved a part of its murals.

A crypt of the 11th century, dug a posteriori under the choir, also preserves frescos of the time. The plan does not have transepts, for good reasons: buildings were in the north, and the principal street passes to the south. The Romanesque gate is preserved in part to the south. Cut down by this stage, one found there before the Revolution, an equestrian statue representing Constantine. This statue was the counterpart of another, older statue destroyed by the Huguenots in 1562. It is not known if the identity of the first rider had been the same. Behind this statue, on the ground, a small vault dedicated to Saint Katherine was referred to during the Middle Ages.

The bell-tower dates from the 11th century. In the beginning it was much more obvious: the first level is concealed today by the roofs. Located at the site of the crossing, it presents a square base, then over it a circular level of a roof decorated with tiles. This type of roof, frequent in the south-west, was often copied by the architects of the 19th century, in particular Paul Abadie in Angoulême, Périgueux and Bordeaux.

During the second quarter of the 12th century, the old bell-tower-porch which was on the frontage was removed and the church was increased by two spans towards the west. In the south, the turret of a staircase marks the site of this enlargement. It is at that time that the celebrated screen facade was built.

In the north, there was a cloister in the 12th century. It was removed in 1857 for the construction of the metal markets. There remains the door (walled up). Three arches supported by columns duplicated with capitals with foliage were re-installed in the court of the university opposite, as was a pillar on the corner.

Private vaults were added to the Romanesque structure during the 15th and 16th centuries. Of Flamboyant Gothic style, they belonged to the middle-class families of the city, who had been merchants since the end of the Middle Ages. The largest was built in the south by Yvon the Insane, Grand Seneschal of Poitou in the 15th century. His tomb was placed there before the Revolution.

== Interior decoration ==
The Romanesque frescoes do not survive apart from those in the apse vault above the choir and in the crypt. Above the choir one can see an uncommon portrayal of the apocalypse: the Virgin and Child are shown in a mandorla, Christ is in majesty on the vault, between a circle and a square, then the Lamb of God is shown in a circle. All around, under the arches are the Twelve Apostles seated, as on the facade. Historians of art think that this painting served as a model for the sculptures on the facade, the attitudes and the composition being identical. In the angles, angels accompany souls to paradise.

In the crypt, the frescoes show anonymous saints. The whole ensemble was restored by Joly-Leterme in 1851. He had the columns and the vaults repainted with "Romano-byzantine" motifs, departing from a principle current among the restorers of the 19th century, that of the influence of the Crusades on Romanesque art. Fantastical and rather heavy, these paintings have been criticised since then. The writer Joris-Karl Huysmans called them "tattoos".

The carvings of the capitals are sober, using stylised foliage called "feuilles grasses" (thick leaves). Only one capital is historiated: situated in the deambulatory on the south side, it shows the Ascension with Christ standing in a mandorla. The capitals in the choir are inspired by the Corinthian capitals of antiquity. The name "Robertus" appears but the reason for this is unknown. Crosses formy are carved here and there on the columns, in the #combles# and on the bell tower. In the chapel of St Anne, called the Madman's Chapel, are found a Deposition in the Tomb carved in stone and coloured. Dating from the beginning of the 16th century it comes from the former abbey of the Trinity.

== Furniture ==
The church was refurnished after the Revolution. Thus, one finds there a Baroque pulpit carved from wood in the 17th century, coming from the convent, two bronze lecterns of the 16th century. The statue of Our Lady of the Keys dated from the end of the 16th or beginning of the 17th century. The tradition says that it is a copy of the miraculous statue, destroyed by the Huguenots in 1562. Its hieratic, foreign style in the taste of the end of the 16th century, recalls the Romanesque period. The whole of the stained glass dates from the 19th and 20th centuries. The choir organ is end of the 19th century, whereas the large organ is from 1996.

== West Front sculptures ==
Above the two side doors is a set of high reliefs illustrating passages from the Bible. The selected scenes, taken from both Testaments, tell of the Annunciation and the Incarnation of God on earth in the person of Jesus Christ to save humanity.

In 1562, at the time of the sack of Poitiers, the Huguenots broke the heads of the figures which they regarded as idols. In the 17th century, the merchant salters' workshops stood against the west front, causing some deterioration of the calcareous stone by the effects of salt.

An extensive restoration campaign began in 1992: the stones were cleaned in the laboratory and were reinstalled. The inauguration of the restored frontage took place in 1995. It was for this occasion that the artists of Skertzò created a spectacle of multi-coloured lighting (polychromies). Every evening during the summer, at nightfall, the west front of the Church of Notre-Dame-la-Grande was illuminated in a whole palette of colours, a reminder of its past and the mediaeval tradition of painting churches.

=== Left ===
From left to right may be seen Adam and Eve, Nebuchadnezzar II King of Babylon, and the prophets Daniel, Moses, Isaiah and Jeremiah (all four of whom were seen in medieval theology as foreseeing the arrival of a Saviour). Next are the Annunciation, a Tree of Jesse (with Jesus's ancestors) and King David. Together they evoke the relationship which exists between the Old Testament and the New in the Christian Church.

=== Right ===
First is the Visitation, framed by the towns of Nazareth (also symbolising Synagogue) and Jerusalem (also symbolising the Church), both shown as medieval cities. The additional symbolism represents the transition from the Jewish law to Christ's new covenant.

Next are the Nativity of Jesus and the Bathing of the Christ Child (the latter drawn from apocryphal books and including the eucharistic cup, thus foreshadowing the events of Christ's Passion). To the right of the bathing is a perplexed St. Joseph. Below Joseph, two men are shown fighting (according to a recent study (cf bibliography) this is Jacob wrestling with the Angel). Just above, the arcades hold statues of the twelve apostles and two bishops. According to local tradition the bishops are St Hilary of Poitiers and St Martin of Tours.

=== Gable ===
At the top is the parousia, with Christ standing in a mandorla, surrounded by the Tetramorph, below the sun and the moon.

== The legend of the miracle of the keys ==
In the year 1202, the English besieged the city of Poitiers. The mayor's clerk promised to deliver the city to them, on Easter Day, by providing them with the keys to the city in exchange for a large sum of money. In the night, the clerk went to the room of the mayor to steal the keys, but they had disappeared. To his dismay, the mayor also realized that the keys had disappeared and he was alarmed because he realized that treason had been committed. He thus held back his soldiers and went to the church of Notre Dame-la-Grande to request a miracle. There he discovered the statue of the Virgin Mary holding the keys. However, during the night, under the ramparts, frightened by the appearances of the Virgin, Saint Hilary and Saint Radegunda, the English killed each other and fled. This event is represented, in the church, in a stained glass window of the 19th century and on a table of the 17th century.

The church of St-Hilaire-la-Grande of Poitiers preserves three stone statues (the Virgin with the Child, Saint Hilary and Saint Radegunda) which formerly decorated the gate of the moat, the place of the miracle. The legend is not credible from a historical point of view since, in 1202, Poitou formed part of the English duchy of Aquitaine, under the reigns of Henry II and Eleanor of Aquitaine. The oldest account of the legend can be found in Jean Bouchet's Annals of Aquitaine. The legend became very popular, especially after the arrival of the admiral Gaspard II of Coligny in 1569. Until 1887 the citizens of Poitiers celebrated this divine protection by a solemn procession through the city. In the 19th century a statue of the Virgin Mary, with the keys, was set up in the middle of the church.
