= Magnus of Trani =

3nd-century bishop and saint

Saint Magnus of Anagni
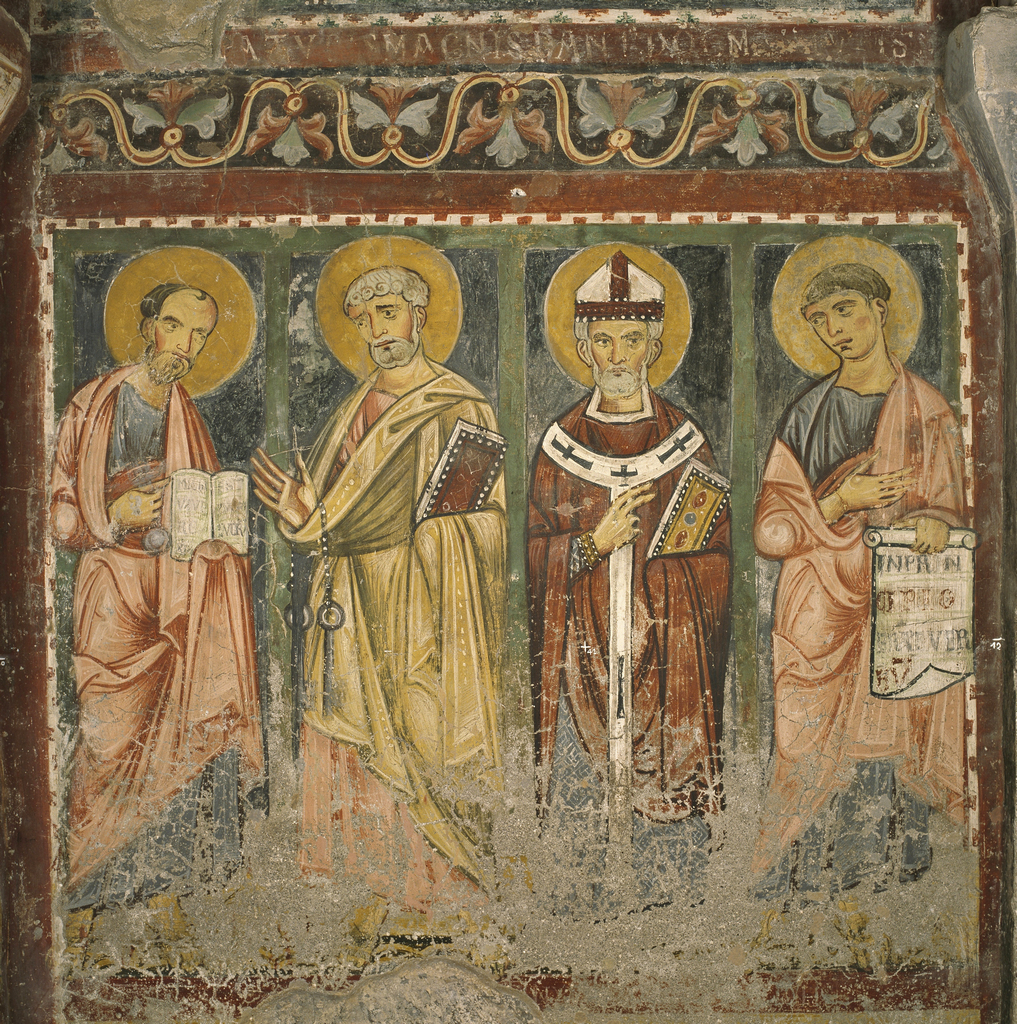

Bishop and Martyr
- Born: Trani
- Died: c. 250 near Fabrateria, probably Fabrateria Nova
- Venerated in: Catholic Church
- Major shrine: Anagni Cathedral
- Feast: August 19
- Attributes: episcopal attire, palm of martyrdom
- Patronage: Anagni; Santi Michele e Magno, Rome; Colle San Magno

Saint Magnus of Trani (Italian: San Magno di Trani; born around 200 AD), also known as Magnus of Anagni, Magnus Episcopus or Magnus of Fabrateria Vetus (probably Fabrateria Nova near Ceprano), is venerated by Catholics as the patron saint of Anagni in the Province of Frosinone (Lazio), together with his apprentice Saint Secundina. According to the legend, he is also associated with the church of Santi Michele e Magno in Rome, from where a skull and an arm were translated to St. Peter's Basilica. Since 1901 the saint is venerated in Louisville, Kentucky, after a set of relics – including a skull – from Anagni were sent to the St. Martin of Tours Catholic Church.

Pope Gregory XIII's Roman Martyrology from the year 1583 referred to Magnus as bishop and martyr of Anagnia. In the revised edition of 2001 he is classified as a martyr from Lazio (since 2004 Fabrateriae Veterus), with the proviso that the data regarding his actual life are uncertain. On August 19, his feast is celebrated in Anagni and many other places.

Hagiographers have always speculated about the saint's true identity. According to the Neapolitan scholar Gennaro Luongo, "the dossier of St. Magnus is among the most intriguing in medieval hagiography due to the variety of texts [...]. The many versions of the Passio or Vita, which have completely ignored the scant but reliable data from liturgical documentation, have – because of the story's evident stereotypical and fabulous character – posed serious difficulties for defining the saint's biographical profile and even his historical identity".

Recent studies suggest that his character may have been a combination of a paleo-Christian martyr from Lazio and a Lombard bishop of Trani. In the 9th and 10th centuries, his cult became intertwined with that of the Eastern military saint Andrew Stratelates ("the Tribune") and his 2,597 fellow warriors from Cilicia, but from the late 11th century onward, his episcopal legacy was claimed almost exclusively by the Anagni Cathedral, where, according to legend, his relics had been transferred from Fondi, and where his Passion was edited around 1100. Probably due to the interaction, a third character evolved – the supposed martyr Magnus of Cappadocia from Caesarea, whose deeds are preserved in several manuscripts, the oldest dating from the 13th-century. The 18th-century Bollandist Willem Cuypers regarded them as distinct figures, alongside Andrew the Tribune, who was at times also referred to as Magnus.

The 19th-century historian Sabine Baring-Gould took Magnus for a "mistaken duplication" of Saint Andrew, due to an additional comma that made one martyr into two. Frederick Holweck suggested that the saint might have been "a product of fancy" or at least have been "manufactured by blundering martyrologists". Their Italian colleague Francesco Lanzoni argued the opposite – that the original story of Magnus, like those of other Italian martyrs, was "torn from its place of origin" and relocated to the eastern provinces. There, it must have absorbed, as we may assume, additional motifs, which later found their way back to Italy, taking root in the Passion of Magnus of Cappadocia. The latter include elements from the Passion of Andrew the Tribune (such as the number of companions) and also from that of Saint Mammes of Caesarea (youth as a shepherd, taming of lions, withstanding the flames, names of persecutors). The 12th-century tradition unequivocally characterizes Magnus as an athleta Christi, thereby emphasizing not only his classical role as thaumaturgus and monastic champion fighting the devil, but also drawing a parallel with contemporary crusading ideals.

The rediscovery of Saint Magnus and the development of his cult, led by Bishop Peter of Anagni (c. 1030–1105) – himself soon to be canonized – formed part of the Gregorian political programme aimed at strengthening the Papal State and enhancing the role of the high-ranking noble families associated with it. Hence, the political strife surrounding the Investiture Controversy also involved the figure of Magnus, possibly explaining the emergence of a second bodily relic attributed to him in Rome during this period. The 13th-century crypt of the Cattedrale di Santa Maria Annunziata in Anagni is dedicated to Magnus and decorated with frescoes of scenes from his life, death, and afterlife, where his shrine is symbolically rendered as the Ark of the Covenant.

The renewed veneration of Saint Magnus in Rome around 1600, on the other hand, might be attributed to Tridentian efforts aimed at centralizing authority within the Papal State and reinforcing the episcopal hierarchy. The strengthening of the particular and the expansion of hagiography – as expressed in the cult of Saint Magnus – formed part of a broader Baroque constellation that reflected the shifting power dynamics of early modern Europe, in line with the cultural logic described by Peter Burke. This same period also witnessed the rise of critical scholarship, notably among the Bollandists, who sought to disentangle overlapping hagiographic traditions in response to growing demands for historical legitimacy. After the Napoleonic period, the cult of Saint Magnus – where it remained active – increasingly became a symbol of local patriotism, tied to the rise of the Italian nation-state. For conservative integralism, the cult may have been seen as too particular, though it did intersect in certain ways with the broader currents of Marian veneration. In the 20th century, Saint Magnus was recognized as the patron of the church of Santi Michele e Magno in Rome (commonly known as the Church of the Frisians), thereby becoming a liturgical centre for Dutch Catholics in Italy.

August 19 is also the feast of Saint Magnus of Cuneo, supposed martyr of the Theban Legion, whose cult in the village of Castelmagno (Piedmont), around the Chapel of San Magno, and elsewhere in the Province of Cuneo cannot be traced further back than the 15th century. Though the Roman Martyrology only lists the bishop from Anagnia, the Acta Sanctorum and other reference works also refer to Magnus of Cappadocia, according to Baring-Gould due to the above-mentioned duplication. The 19th-century scholar Johann Stadler identified 35 saints and blessed with the name of Magnus, including the abbot Magnus of Füssen, the bishops Magnus of Avignon (also commemorated on August 19), Magnus of Oderzo, Magnus of Milan, Magnus of Sens, and the martyr Magnus of Orkneys. Most others have been derived from the martyrology of Jerome.

== Traditional narrative ==
The saint's name is not mentioned in contemporary sources, but has been widely known since the 9th century. The oldest manuscripts of his Passion date from the late 11th or first half of the 12th century, probably based on older legends (see the summary table at the end of this article). Manlio Simonetti published an abbreviated version of the Saint's Passio, apparently derived from a Southern Italian original. A fuller version survives in a 12th-century manuscript from St. Paul's Abbey in Utrecht, its contents published in 1737 by the Bollandist scholar Willem Cuypers. It is believed to correspond to 13th-century manuscripts from Saint-Omer, Bruges, and Spoleto, along with a dozen or so later copies. Caution is warranted, however, as the transmission history of the Passion has not been thoroughly studied. Major revisions of the legend, notably, took place in the city of Anagni during the 12th and 13th centuries. The narrative is embedded in a breviary, long kept in the Anagni chapter archive until it was seized by Pope Alexander VII (1599–1667). The volume subsequently entered through his heirs in the Biblioteca Chigiana before being transferred to the Vatican in 1923. Significant sections were first made public by the antiquarian and canon of Anagni, Giovanni Marangoni, in 1743, and later by the ecclesiastical historian Giuseppe Cappelletti in 1847. Parallel redactions are attested in other Italian manuscripts. A distinct textual tradition, slightly different, emerged in Central Europe from the 12th century onward. Despite its various adaptations, Gennaro Luongo maintains that the legend has a homogeneous core.

The tradition is stratified, as older manuscripts make no mention of Fondi as the site of Magnus's martyrdom. Moreover, certain versions suggest that the opening section of the passion may have circulated as an independent text. The translation of his body to Anagni represents a later accretion, interwoven with narrative elements drawn from the hagiographies of Saint Paternus of Fondi, Saint Secundina of Anagni, and Saint Peter of Anagni. Late medieval and early modern interpolations further shaped the composite image of the saint's life and posthumous veneration. Yet establishing a coherent chronology remains problematic, as the textual tradition cannot be traced back to one or more archetypes due to reciprocal contamination among the various branches. As with many hagiographic corpora, dating is complicated by circular reasoning: legendary timelines are used to substantiate historical claims, which in turn are cited to validate the authenticity of the texts.

=== Bishop in Trani ===
According to the earliest extant manuscripts, Magnus was living in Trani (Apulia) in the early 3rd century AD, the son of a pagan named Apollo. At a young age, he became a shepherd to support his family, tending a rapidly growing flock of sheep and donating his earnings to the poor. An angel, as another manuscript tells us, brought him ten pounds of gold that allowed him to get into the sheep-farming business. Magnus and his father — who received the Christian name Reperatus — were baptized by Bishop Redento of Trani (Latin: Redemptus). After being instructed in the faith, his father died, but not before pledging to give his possessions to the poor. When the bishop died, Magnus was proclaimed bishop of Trani by the whole congregation.

During the persecution of Christians under Proconsul Severinus of Apulia, Magnus was imprisoned in a pagan temple for openly professing his faith in Christ, mocking the idols, and refusing to offer sacrifices. Miraculously, the idols within the temple shattered on their own. In an alternate account, Magnus is the one who destroys the statues. In response to his prayer, the Archangel Michael appeared, unlocked the temple doors, and instructed him to distribute the gold from Jupiter's statue to the poor.

=== Missionary in Lazio ===
Magnus fled northward — either by ship, or more commonly, as most accounts suggest, on foot — and continued his journey disguised as a beggar. A destitute woman who offered him shelter was blessed with divine gifts. In Naples, he stayed for three nights with Saint Januarius (who, in fact, lived half a century later) before heading to Rome to visit the tombs of Peter and Paul. Warned by the angel, Magnus realized just in time that his traveling companion (who had joined him 25 miles or 37 km from Naples) was actually the devil, who had planned to fight him on a hidden place and cast his body down. Subsequent accounts claim that the devil than changed into a snake, or, alternatively, threw himself into a river. The angel then accompanied Magnus on his journey. However, due to flooding, Magnus was unable to cross the river Vulturnus, and no boat was available to carry him across. Nearby, Magnus found an existing church, and the angel told him to remain there: "Stay in this place, for the Lord intends to work many miracles through you." In later versions, particularly those from Central Europe, the angel miraculously lead him across the flooded river to reveal the venerable church where he was supposed to settle down.

Pretending to be poor, Magnus sat down at the ceremonial main doors (ante regias). It was a high feast day, and many people gathered, including a youngster named Paternus, who earlier had a vision about the visitor. Paternus asked for his name ("people call me the great one") and took him into his home, where he was allowed to stay for an extended period. With God's help, Magnus began to heal the sick and exorcize the devils possessing them, and his fame spread throughout the province. The gifts he received from the people were used to build a basilica as the angel had foretold. When 22 robbers attempted to steal the saint's supposed treasures from his monastery, they were struck blind — but in response to their pleas, Magnus healed their eyes and persuaded them to abandon their life of plunder. As a holy man, Magnus worked to spread Christianity in Lazio and adjacent regions. He performed excorsisms among the notables of Sora, Aquino, and Picenum. He also recruited a young woman named Secundina from Anagni, who would subsequently die as a Christian martyr.

During the reign of Emperor Decius (249–251 AD) and the prefecture of Valerian, the persecution of Christians intensified. Alarmed by Magnus's growing fame, the Emperor ordered thirty soldiers to arrest him. Forty miles outside Rome, along the Via Latina, the soldiers encountered the devil, who denounced Magnus as a magician and seducer, advising them to arrest his apprentice Secundina first. If the holy virgin refused to sacrifice to the idols, Magnus was to execute her personally. A certain Tarquinius, a fervent pagan, betrayed her whereabouts. With their prisoner, the soldiers traveled to the church where Magnus was staying. They struck him down and set fire to the church utensils. Magnus asked for time to reflect, locked himself in his cell (cubiculum), and prayed to be taken away. After his death, the soldiers found his body and fled. Other accounts agree, however, that his body was decapitated posthumously, some even suggest that the soldiers chopped his limbs and burned down the monastery. The Utrecht manuscript unequivocally states that he was tortured to death, the 13th-century Anagni frescoes show how the crown of his skull was severed off after death. Paternus, who had witnessed angels carrying Magnus's soul to heaven, buried his teacher with his own hands. Returning to his home, he was arrested. But the soldiers, who had intended to take revenge, died that same night (one account says they killed each other in rage,) and their bodies were devoured by wolves and dogs. This gave Paternus the opportunity to escape. Magnus therefore appeared to Paternus in a dream to comfort him.

=== Martyrer in Fondi ===
Details concerning Magnus's death appear in the Austrian recension of the Passion, preserved in the Magnum Legendarium Austriacum — a legendary compiled in the latter half of the 12th century. The narrative is enriched with motifs drawn from the passion of Magnus of Cappadocia: Magnus is thrown to bears and wolves, who instead show reverence and lick his feet. He is then cast into a burning oven, yet the flames are miraculously extinguished by heavenly dew. Enraged by his sudden death, the soldiers mutilate his corps; Paternus gathers the remains, anoints them with fragrant balm, wraps them in linen, and places them in a marble sarcophagus (theca). He inscribes the tomb with the words Hic requiescit gloriosus martyr et insignis praesul meritis et nomine Magnus (Here rests the glorious martyr and distinguished bishop, by merit and by name Magnus — "the great one"), and places the historia of the saint's life and martyrdom at the foot of the shrine. The narrative implicitly echoes the (re)discovery of Magnus's body in Anagni around 1100, yet omits mention of this event and instead underscores the authenticity and antiquity of his vita. Fondi is not referenced, and Paternus's death is likewise absent.

Only after the discovery of Paternus' body in 1215 at the Abbey of San Magno, and its subsequent transfer — alongside the relics of Honorius and Libertinus — to the Cathedral of Saint Peter, does the cult surrounding Magnus's violent death become tangible in Fondi. During a severe plague outbreak, local noblemen broke their oath of secrecy and revealed the location of the hidden relics. By then, it was generally accepted that Magnus had once been active in Fondi, though his body was later transferred posthumously to Anagni. A subsequent tradition, attested since the first half of the 14th century, suggest that Magnus arrived in Fondi via the Via Appia, where he was delayed at the river, apparently the rivulet Legula or Fiume di S. Magno. After crossing the water, the angel lead him to an estate near the Campus Dimitrianus (or Mitrianus) where he chose to settle down. From this location he conducted his missionary work. It was here, in his hermitage or cave dwelling, that he was slain and buried on the spot — later transformed to the crypt of the Abbey. The details appear only in Italian manuscripts, most of them dating from the 16th and 17th centuries.

The narrative is further elaborated in the Legenda and Passio of Saint Paternus, likewise preserved only in early modern redactions — one of which, however, claims to cite an ancient parchment manuscript from the Cathedral of St. Peter. Their dating and authenticity remain a matter of scholarly debate. It is stated here that Paternus first built a church in Ceprano, before founding the future Abbey of San Magno, erecting a church dedicated to the Holy Virgin on an (Christian) burial ground with subterranean crypts. When soldiers approached, he fled to nearby Monte Arcano, from where he witnessed the torture and slaughter of Magnus and his 2,597 companions. After three days, he descended from his hiding place to bury the saint's body in his cell. He then returned home, where he was arrested, bound in chaims and forced to offer sacrifices to the pagan gods. That night, Magnus appeared in his dream, and led him to Heaven. In another version of the story, Paternus buried all the decapitated bodies and was caught in the act. In memory of the massacre, the chapel of Santuario della Madonna della Rocca was established on the mountain, while the nearby valley was named the Valle dei Martiri, as it "became renowned, drenched in the blood of the saints and filled with their bodies".

The story of Magnus's life and death was also disseminated in a shorthand version — the Epitomae — as well as in breviaries. The most influential account, however, was the vita incorporated around 1400 into the German Der Heiligen Leben, a compendium of saints' lives compiled by Dominican circles in Nuremberg. The compendium became "the most influential model for most of the vernacular legendaries of the fifteenth century." Some 200 manuscripts and over 40 incunabula are known, primarily in High German, but also in Low German and Dutch. Part of these manuscripts include the Passio of Magnus, augmented with narratives concerning Paternus — particularly the printed editions, mostly originating from Augsburg. The Low German version is known as the Lübecker Passional. The Latin text in printed editions of the Legenda Aurea, by contrast, confines itself to Magnus's activity in Trani and the scene of his death.

=== Translation to Anagni ===
The legends surrounding the veneration of Saint Magnus took a definitive in the final decades of the 11th century, following the discovery in Anagni of a sarcophagus containing a skull and bones attributed to him. The core narrative was shaped by the Vita of Saint Peter of Anagni — an influential bishop and (alleged) papal legate — originally conceived by Bruno of Segni shortly after Peter's death in 1105. It was subsequently rewritten before 1180, and reworked around 1325 to align with the devotional framework of the Anagni rite.

Additional details appear in the Translatio Verulam inde Anagniam (Translation from Veroli to Anagnia), likely composed around 1115 by Peter's second successor, Pietro II. This text is preserved in the same 14th-century breviary as the Vita of Saint Peter, along with those of Secondina and a revised version of Magnus's Vita — all collectivily enriched with liturgical additions.

According to the account, tribune Plato of Veroli looted the relics of Saint Magnus from the ruins of Fondi following the Arab raid against Rome in 846, allegedly to safeguard them. As the text goes,

Plato ... moved by divine love, learned that the most precious treasure of the sacred body had long lain neglected and forgotten in the aforementioned place. After consulting with his companions, he went to the site, opened the tomb not without great fear, and, finding the holy bones in a marble sarcophagus, transferred them and brought them with all the religious reverence he could muster to Veroli.

It is a classical account of relic theft (furta sacra). The saint's body was temporarily kept in Veroli, in the crypt of the Cathedral of Sant'Andrea Apostolo, but even there it was not safe. The legend claims that a Muslim overlord named Muca subsequently converted Magnus's crypt into a stable. When the horses placed in the stable began to die, Muca became frightened and sold the relics to citizens of Anagni, who had effectively ransomed their own city to avoid its plunder. It is stated, moreover, that the relics were translated to Anagni Cathedral in the presence of the Bishop Zacharias (who was in fact papal legate to Constantinopel, fl. 877). An alternative legend holds that the saint's relics were looted from Fondi and eventually ended up in the Santi Michele e Magno church in Rome.

== Historical doubts ==
The factual basis of the translation narrative is open to doubt: although Fondi was destroyed twice, neither Anagni nor Veroli was ever besieged by Arab forces. The antiquarian Pasquale Cayro from San Giovanni Incarico was the first, in 1797, to challenge the commonly accepted account. He considered it highly unlikely that the monks and clerics of Fondi would have permitted such a peaceful transfer. Moreover, the 5th-century Martyrology of Jerome listed Magnus as a martyr from Fabrateria, which Cayro identified with Falvaterra, near Ceprano. Magnus may have passed through Fondi on his way back from Rome, but he neither died nor was buried there; his body was later transferred directly to Veroli.

More recently, archaeologists and historians have proposed San Giovanni Incarico, situated along the river Liri, as the place where the legend may have originated. The archaeologist Angelo Nicolai identified a former church where the saint's body might have been interred. In a later phase, the narrative setting must have shifted to nearby Ceprano, where churches dedicated to Magnus and Paternus were present in the tenth and eleventh centuries. Vincenzo Fiocchi Nicolai proposed a subsequent transfer of Magnus's relics to Fondi, possibly in the context of monastic consolidation or episcopal reorganization.

The historian Alessandro Vella has speculated that the relics may have been looted in 862 by imperial troops returning from a military campaign in southern Italy and brought to Rome. How they came to be in Anagni remains unexplained.

== Veneration ==
The cult of a local martyr Saint Magnus was widespread in Lazio and surrounding area's since the 4th or 5th centuries. As a consequence, the saint's relics may have been translated from a local cemetery to the newly founded Abbey of Fondi, erected in 522 by the abbot Saint Honoratus. According to a 9th-century document, the abbey was dedicated to St. Magnus. Magnus is also mentioned in the 5th-century martyrology of Jerome, in which his death place, or more likely his resting place is listed as Fabrateria, probably Fabrateria Nova or San Giovanni Incarico near Ceprano (not Fabrateria Vetus or Ceccano as has been wrongly inferred). His name appears in Bede's martyrology, in the Sacramentarium Gelasianum (8th century), and in many other liturgical calendars and martyrologies. The Gelasian liturgy firmly anchors his name to the August 19 feast, summoning a prayer for release from death's captivity. During the 9th and 10th centuries his fame spread all over Europe, often being associated with that of Andrew the Tribune, due to the martyrologies of Usard, Ado of Vienne, and the so-called Vetus Romanum. Magnus' name is absent from the 9th-century Marble Calendar in the Cathedral of Naples, where only the latter saint is mentioned as Andreas Milex ("the warrior").

The earliest record in the archiepiscopal archive of Trani, dating from 834, states that the town's church was commonly known as the episcopal Church of St. Magnus. A late 10th‑century Greek Gospel from Capua identifies him as the former bishop of Fondi. As a rule, however, he was depicted as a martyr; only from the late 12th century onward was he also described as both bishop and martyr. Around the same time, Andrew and his alleged alter ego faded into obscurity. Occasionally, saints' calendars still mentioned their 2,597 companions, while Magnus of Cappadocia gradually emerged as a distinct figure sharing the same feast day. Andrew made a comeback, however, at the close of the Middle Ages, due to the printing of medieval calendars and martyrologies. Being detached from Magnus, his name was reintroduced in the 1583 Roman Martyrology, where he still can be found. In Fondi, moreover, a local tradition preserved the idea of a valley of martyrs, where Magnus' companions were said to have been killed.

There is some reason to doubt whether the events described in the Translation actually took place in the 9th century. Archaeological research in the Abbey of Fondi suggests that Magnus' relics were cherished here well into the 11th century, when the church was completely rebuilt around the supposed shrine.

The Cathedral of Anagny was rebuilt 1072 to 1104 under the rule the influential bishop Peter of Anagni (fl. 1105), who is said to have discovered the marble sarcophagus holding the Saint's body under the church floor. The chest was sealed with iron bands, which – according to legend – magically loosened. Despite the Greek inscription, Peter was unsure of the saint's identity until it was confirmed by revelation. After Peter was canonized himself, his remains were buried in 1112 next to those of Magnus in the crypt under the main altar. During the reconstruction of the crypt in 1231, the saint's relics were recovered and then ceremonially buried under a new cosmatesque mosaic floor.

Magnus was declared patron saint of Anagni, and was also venerated in Colle San Magno (Frosinone), in San Mango sul Calore and San Mango Piemonte (Campania), in San Mango d'Aquino (Calabria), and many other towns and villages. He enjoyed wide veneration in the lower Latium region as well as in Umbria, Campania and Apulia. In Cittaducale (Lazio) he was rediscovered as the original patron saint during the 17th century.

The newly founded Carolinian Abbey of Saint-Riquier in Picardy cherished his relics as early as the 790s. His veneration in Northern Germany started in the 9th century, when Pope Nicholas I donated the saint's relics to the bishop of Münster, probably destined for the parish church of Everswinkel. Though remaining a minor saint, his popularity was boosted by the consecration of the Saint Magnus church in Braunschweig in 1031, which was followed by several village churches such as Niedermarsberg (Sauerland) in 1043. It is thought that established Benedictine abbeys and episcopal churches played an important role in the spread of his relics and cult to the Frisian, Westphalian and Lower Saxon districts, especially in the dioceses of Münster, Utrecht and Bremen. Accordingly, Magnus became the patron saint of the parishes of Hollum, Anloo, Sande, and Tating. His relics were also mentioned in an 11th-century tradition about a supposed case of dancing mania in the Saxonian village of Cölbigk. Magnus became a popular dynastic name in Germany and Scandinavia. Around the city of Bremen, the veneration of Magnus flowered during the later Middle Ages. About 1250, the Bishop of Minden was able to acquire a finger from Anagni; later the Minden Cathedral claimed to possess large parts of the saint's relics. The St. Vitus Cathedral of Prague cherished a piece of thigh bone.

During the Investiture Controversy, when the pope retreated to Anagni, another set of relics (including a skull and two armbones) appeared in Rome, where they were kept in the Church of Santi Michele e Magno, since its reconstruction in 1141. A plaque from about 1300 tells how three Frisian warriors and a holy virgin had saved the saint's corps from the Saracens in Fondi during the aftermath of the raid against Rome in 846, mirroring the translation story of Anagni. According to the text, divine intervention convinced the Frisians not to take the relics home. They were allowed, however, to take an arm. The saint's relics were brought to Esens in East Frisia, where a silver shrine was carried around in processions during the third quarter of the 12th century. The actual presence of Frisian warriors in Rome could be explained by their loyalty to the imperial camp. A subsequent tradition identified Magnus as the Frisian standard bearer called Magnus Forteman, who was said to have captured the city of Rome on behalf of Charlemagne in 799. Additionally, Magnus was destined to become the patron saint of the Frisian districts of Harlingerland and Wûnseradiel, whereas his relics were spread across additional parishes. Most relics got lost in the Reformation, but the forearm was rescued and translated to Anderlecht near Brussels, where it disappeared at the turn of the 18th century. During the reign of Pope Martin IV (1417–1431) the saint's skull was translated to St. Peter's Basilica in the Vatican. In 1602 the skull was placed in a silver buste, worth 800 florins. Additionally, in 1603 the Chapter of Saint Peter had the other arm also transferred. Since the 19th century, both relics have been kept in a glass casket in the relic chapel. They are displayed to the public on feast days. Some minor relics remained in the Church of Michael and Magnus. Since the 17th century Magnus also serves as patron saint of the Church of Santi Michele e Magno.

In the 1890s the remains of a saint called Magnus (commemorated on August 19) were kept by the Cistercian Sisters of Charity in Anagni, who cherished the relics collected by the 18th-century antiquarians Marcantonio Boldetti and Giovanni Marangoni. As the convent had to be relocated, the relics of Saint Magnus and the virgin Saint Bonosa were brought to Rome and subsequently — with special permission of Pope Leo XIII — translated to Louisville, Kentucky in 1901. Since then, Saint Magnus is venerated as a Roman centurion, who is thought to have been executed 207 AD as he tried to rescue Bonosa (instead of the Saint Secundina) from execution, after which both of them were buried in the catacomb of Pontian. Theoretically, the remains could originate from one of Saint Magnus's namesakes. According to the archaeologist Philip DiBlasi, who conducted research in 2012, the saint was largely of European descent and died in his late forties. Apart from the skull, the skeletal parts are shattered and said to be less than half complete.

== Major types of the Saint Magnus legend ==
In the hagiographic record of Saint Magnus, two manuscript traditions can be distinguished: one focuses on his life and ministry in Trani and Lazio, while the other is closely linked to his supposed martyrdom in Fondi and the translation of his relics to Anagni.

Magnus06 Magnus ep. Tranensis	Trani / Lazio			Fondi / Anagnia		
Passio	BHL 5167 (inc.)	1100-1200	Laurenziana (Umbria, Abruzzi)	BHL 5168	after 1325	Vatican, Chigiano (Anagni) (ed. Cappelletti)
Passio	BHL 5169	1100-1200	Acta Sanctorum (ed. Cuypers) (Utrecht)	BHL 5167	1597 (?)	Alessandrina (Monte Cassino, Anagni?)
Passio	BHL 5171d	1100-1200	Casanatense (Anagni)	BHL 5168a	1602	Vatican (Fondi)
Passio	Vat. Lat. 13012	1100-1200	Vatican (Assisi)	BHL 5172	1500-1700	Naples, Royal Library (Theatines) (Fondi)
Passio	BHL 5171b	1150-1200	Naples, Royal Library (S. Italy)	BHL 5172b	1550-1600	Vallicelliana (Fondi)
Passio	BHL 5170; BHL 5153z (?)	1150-1200	Magnum Legendarium Austriacum (Lower Austria, Passau, Tegernsee)			
Passio	BHL 5171	1400-1500	Brussels, Royal Library (Naples?)			
Epitomae	BHL 5173	1250-1350	Vallicelliana			
Epitomae	BHL 5174	1400-1500	Prose Passionel (Augsburg, Cologne, Lübeck)			
Translatio				BHL 5175	after 1325	Vatican, Chigiano (Anagni)
Vita S. Petri				BHL 6699	1300-1400	Vatican, Borghesiana; Vatican, Chigiano (Anagni)
