= Abbey of San Magno, Fondi =

Italian Monastery

Coordinates: 41.37775°N 13.38424°E

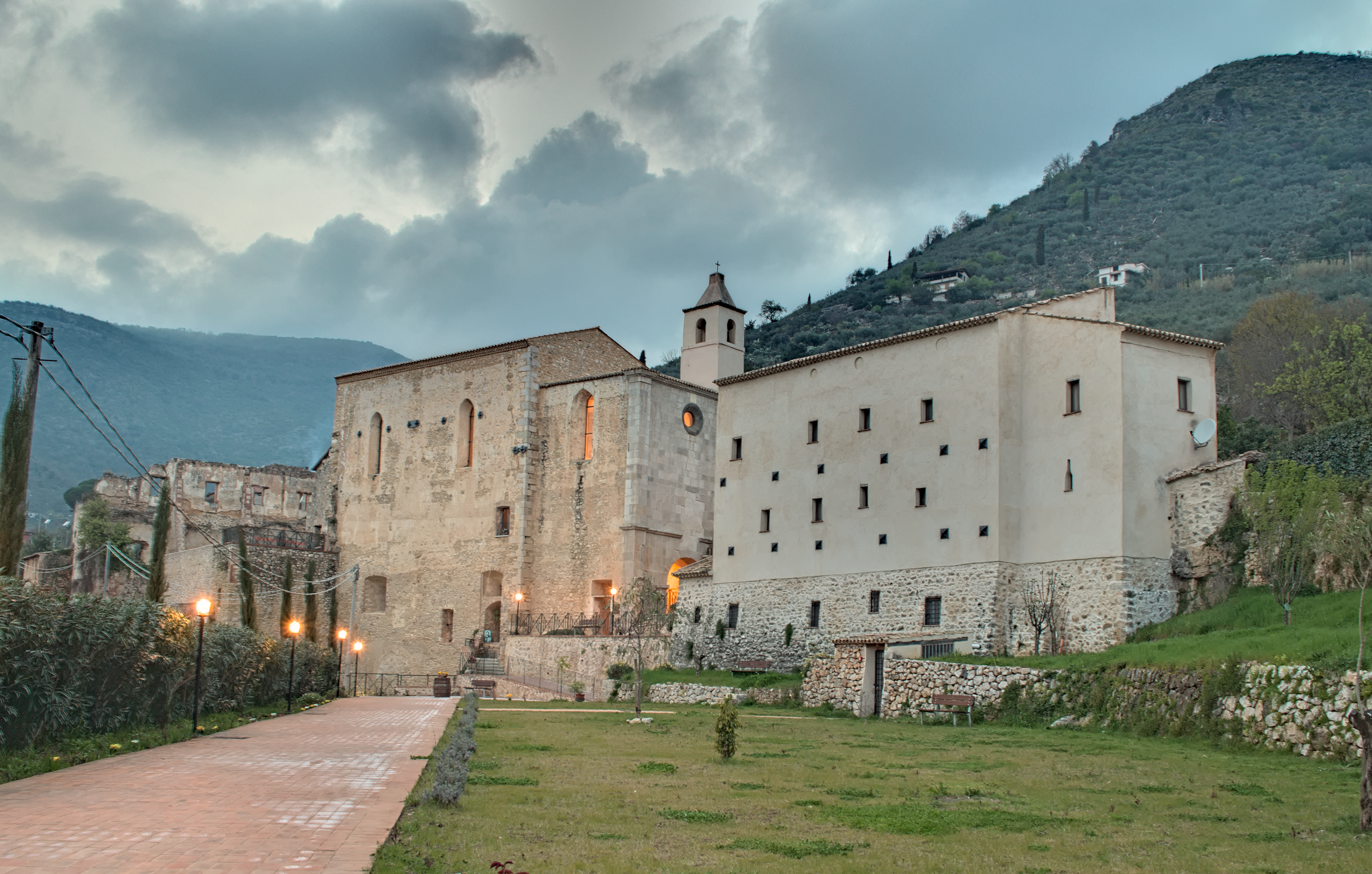
Abbazia San Magno

The Abbey of San Magnus (it:Abbazia di San Magno di Fondi) is a monastery and church at the base of Monte Arcano, outside of the town of Fondi in the province of Latina, region of Lazio, Italy.

== History ==
According to a history by the Pope and Saint Gregory the Great, a Benedictine monastery was erected in 522 by the abbot and Saint Honoratus of Fondi and, according to a 9th-century document, dedicated to St Magnus, putatively an early second century Christian martyr from Lazio, whose memory may have been conflated with that of a bishop of the same name from Trani.

The site was never free of the turmoil of the early medieval period. According to the legend, in 847, during the sack of the town of Fondi, the captain Plato of Veroli looted the relics of San Magnus and moved to them to the cathedral of Sant'Andrea apostolo in Veroli. Putatively during a Saracen raid of Veroli, the remains were bought to safety in Anagni. An alternative legend holds that the saint's relics were translated from Fundi to the Santi Michele e Magno church in Rome, from where they were moved to St. Peter's Basilica. In fact, there are no indications of an early martyr cult, and it is suspected that the remains of Magnus were translated to Fondi in the Early Middle Ages. Because archaeological finds suggest that the veneration of Magnus' relics in Fundi may well have continued until the 11th century, the translation to Anagni must occurred at a later date. It is first mentioned in the Passio of Peter of Anagni by Bruno of Segni, in the early 12th century.

In 1072, the monastery was donated to the Abbey of Montecassino; however in 1492, the pope Alexander VI transferred the monastery to the Olivetan order. In the 15th century under the patronage of Prospero Colonna, the abbey was almost entirely rebuilt. The layout of the original church remains, as does the Romanesque-style crypt. The apse and transept contain remains of 12th-century frescoes. Further damage to the structure was performed during the French occupation of 1797. The structure belongs today to the archdiocese of Gaeta, and is under restoration.

== Bibliography ==
- Nicoletta Cassieri e Daniela Quadrino, Fondi. S. Magno, loc. Divinité inconnue / monastère, in C. Ferrante, J.-C. Lacam, D. Quadrino (ed.), Fana, templa, delubra. Corpus dei luoghi di culto dell'Italia antica (FTD), 4, Regio I. Fondi, Formia, Minturno, Ponza, Roma 2015, pp. 24–28
