= Pandulf of Anagni =

Italian cleric and military commander

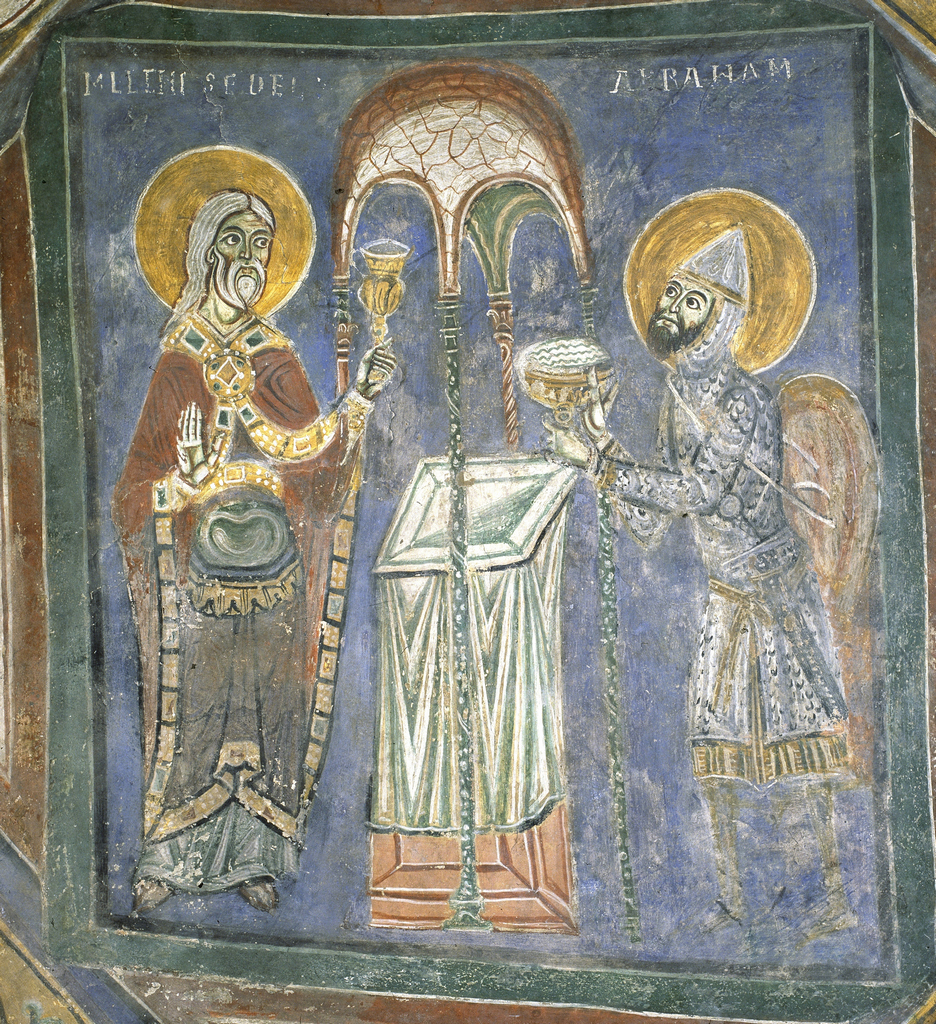
The two sides of Pandulf's career represented in a fresco he commissioned for his cathedral: the priest Melchizedek (left) and the warrior Abraham (right)

Pandulf of Anagni (died 1256) was an Italian cleric and military commander who became the bishop of Anagni in 1237. He came from a prominent family closely connected to a series of popes. In papal service, he led an army into the Kingdom of Sicily during the War of the Keys in 1229. As bishop, he commissioned the frescoes in the cathedral of Anagni.

== Family and papal curia ==
Pandulf was a native of Anagni. He appears in Latin sources as Pandulfus de Anagnia before his election as bishop. He belonged to the family of Conti di Anagni, a branch of the counts of Segni. He was probably related to Pope Gregory IX, who was also from Anagni.

Pandulf was as a subdeacon and chaplain in the Roman curia under Gregory IX. In Gregory's biography in the Liber censuum, he is described as an "experienced" military man (experate providentie virum cum militum). The Liber's modern editor, Carlo Alberto Garufi, misidentified the chaplain Pandulf with Bishop Pandulf of Patti (1235–1244). Both were active in the service of Gregory IX at the same time. Unlike the future bishop of Patti, however, the chaplain is never described as a papal notary. Although he is sometimes identified with the Master Pandulf who served Honorius III, this was more likely the future bishop of Patti.

== Military commander ==
When the pope waged war on the Emperor Frederick II in 1228–1230, Gregory appointed Pandulf as his apostolic legate over the three armies and named him rector of Marittima e Campagna. Pandulf personally took command of the southern force and invaded the Kingdom of Sicily, forcing his way across the Liri at Ceprano on 18 January 1229. He had under him two Sicilian exiles as his captains, Counts Thomas of Molise and Roger of Aquila. His army consisted mainly of infantry raised in the Papal States.

Pandulf's initial advance was highly successful. The Liber celebrates his defeat of the Justiciar Henry of Morra "with just a few infantry and God on his side". He took Monte Cassino after fierce fighting. Resuming his advance in March, he took Gaeta, laid siege to Capua, took Alife and Telese, and joined up with the papal troops of Benevento. Advancing down the Garigliano, he met stiff resistance at Suessa, where he was replaced as legate by Cardinal Pelagius of Albano for reasons unknown. Suessa fell to Pelagius in May. Sometime after his demotion, Pandulf is found among the supporters of Frederick.

== Bishop ==
In 1237, Pandulf became the bishop of Anagni. He is first recorded as bishop elect on 8 June 1237 and was consecrated by 25 May 1238. He continued the restoration of the cathedral of Anagni that had begun with the renovation of the floor in cosmatesque style by Cosimo between 1224 and 1227. He commissioned a series of frescoes and built a new ambo, among other probably changes. He left an inscription: "Bishop Pandulf had this work made in the year of the Lord 1250" (PANDULF EPVS FIERI FECIT HOC OPUS ANO DNI MCCL). The first record of the future Pope Boniface VIII is as a canon witnessing an act of Pandulf's on 16 October 1250. Pandulf made his will on 20 February 1255. He died in Anagni in 1256.

== Bibliography ==
- Donovan, Joseph P. (1950). Pelagius and the Fifth Crusade. University of Pennsylvania Press. ISBN 9780404154165.
- Gianandrea, Manuela (2010). "Creazioni à l'antique: i vassalletto e il fascino della sfinge egizia nel Medioevo romano". Hortus Artium Medievalium. 16: 151–160. doi:10.1484/J.HAM.3.13.
- Gregorovius, Ferdinand (1897). History of the City of Rome in the Middle Ages. Vol. 5, Part 1. Translated by Annie Hamilton. George Bell & Sons.
- Li, Wendan (2021). Die Vita Papst Gregors IX. (1227–1241): Papst und päpstliches Amt in kurialie Sicht. Böhlau Verlag.
- Kamp, Norbert (1975). Kirche und Monarchie im staufischen Königreich Sizilien, 1: Prosopographische Grundlegung: Bistümer und Bischöfe des Königreichs 1194–1266, 3: Sizilien. Wilhelm Fink.
- Maleczek, Werner (1984). Papst und Kardinalskolleg von 1191 bis 1216: Die Kardinäle unter Coelestin III. und Innocenz III. Verlag der Österreichischen Akademie der Wissenschaften.
- Matthew, Donald (1992). The Norman Kingdom of Sicily. Cambridge University Press.
- Montaubin, Pascal (1997). "Entre gloire curiale et vie commune: le chapitre cathédral d'Anagni au XIII^{e} siècle". Mélanges de l'École française de Rome. 109 (2): 303–442. doi:10.3406/mefr.1997.3580.
- Rist, Rebecca (2011). The Papacy and Crusading in Europe, 1198–1245. Bloomsbury.
- Silorata, Mario Bernabò (2007). Gregorio IX e Federico II di Svevia: incontri e scontri tra sacerdozio e impero. Nerbini.
- Sayers, Jane E. (1984). Papal Government and England During the Pontificate of Honorius III (1216–1227). Cambridge University Press.
- Smith, M. Q. (1965). "Anagni: An Example of Medieval Typological Decoration". Papers of the British School at Rome. 33: 1–47. doi:10.1017/S0068246200007303.
- Van Cleve, Thomas C. (1972). The Emperor Frederick II of Hohenstaufen: Immutator Mundi. Clarendon Press.
- Whalen, Brett Edward (2019). The Two Powers: The Papacy, the Empire, and the Struggle for Sovereignty in the Thirteenth Century. University of Pennsylvania Press.
- Zappasodi, Pietro (1908). Anagni attraverso i secoli. Vol. 1. Veroli.
