= Lago di Fondi =

Lake Fondi Lago di Fondi
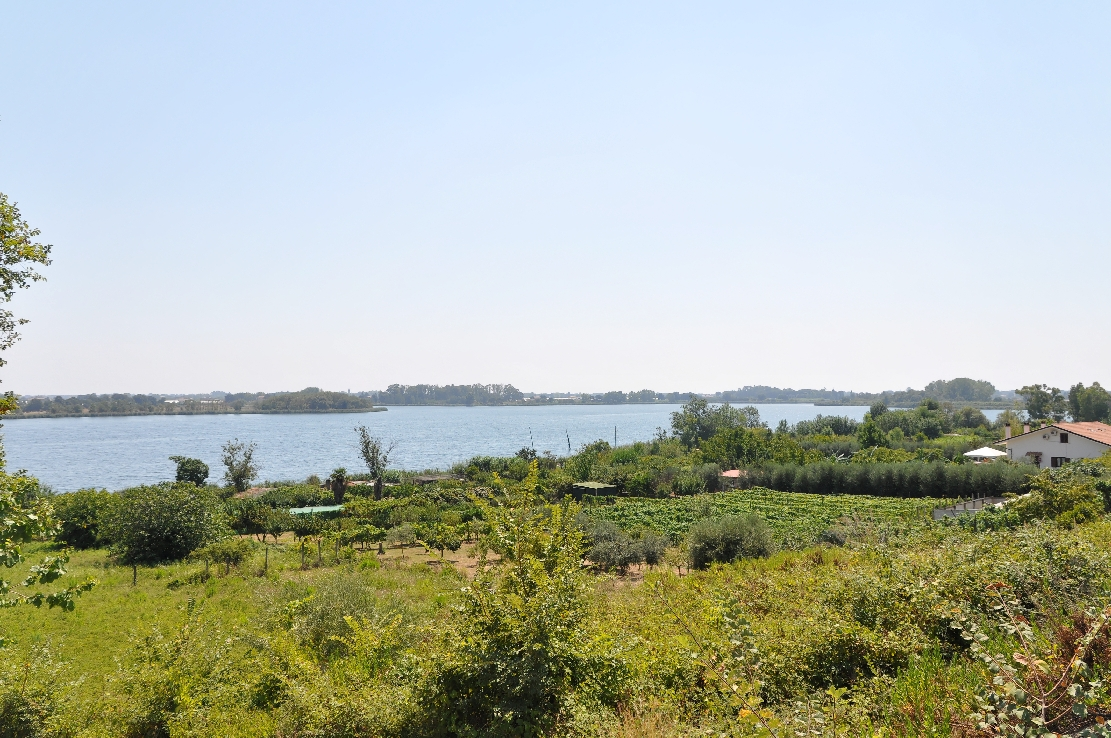
- View of the Piana di Fondi from Temple of Jupiter Anxur over Terracina, looking southeast. The lake and a canal joining it to the Tyrrhenian Sea are visible in the upper left.

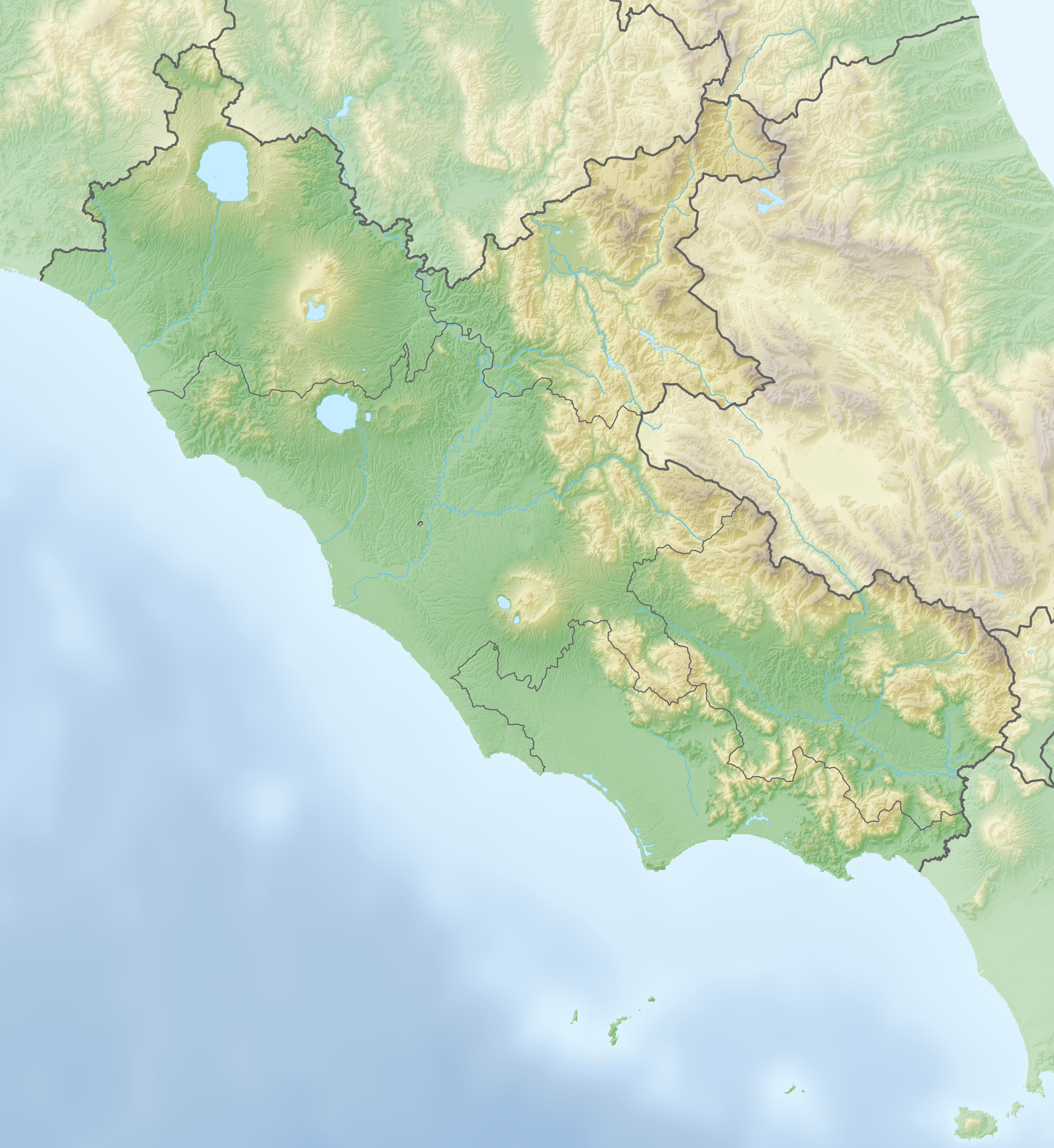
- Location within Lazio
- Location: Province of Latina, Lazio
- Coordinates: 41°19′26″N 13°19′59″E
- Type: Lagoon
- Primary inflows: Canale Portella, Canale S.Vito, Canale Acquachiara
- Primary outflows: Canale Canneto, S. Anastasia, Canale di Vetere
- Basin countries: Italy
- Surface area: 3.8 km^{2} (1.5 sq mi)

Lake Fondi (Italian: Lago di Fondi, Latin: Lacus Fundanus, Lacus Amyclanus) is a brackish lake about 90 km (56 mi) to the southeast of Rome in the Province of Latina, Lazio, Italy, in the region called Sud or "South" Pontino, the western end of which is the Piana di Fondi, "Plain of Fondi". The plain is a basin below the arc of the Monti Ausoni and the Monti Lepini. The lake forms naturally at the west end of the basin in a depression constantly filling with spring water exuding from the base of the mountains, which are a heavily cracked and faulted limestone karst absorbent of most rainfall. In addition to the flows from springs, a number of canals have been constructed from regions of the marsh below sea level to drain water from the marsh into the lake. Pumping stations are required to lift the water into the canals. Before the marsh was reclaimed the lake was part of it. Canals at either end of the lake connect it to the Tyrrhenian Sea.

== Geology ==
All the coastal lagoons of Lazio formed in the same way: an offshore Pliocene graben created by extensional forces in NE and SW directions behind a karst of Mesozoic limestone gradually filled by peaty and fluvial deposition in the Pleistocene. A barrier fringe of sand developed offshore enclosing first a lagoon, then a coastal marsh. The remnant chain of lagoons are brackish due to heavy inflow of fresh water from springs at the base of the porous Volscian Mountains and the intrusion of salt water from the marsh, much of which is still below sea level. The positions of the lakes are determined by local elevations and equilibrium between inflow and outflow. In the last few centuries bonifica or "restoration", of the marshland to produce agricultural land, and associated control of the water channels, have stabilized the lakes as landforms.

== Ecology ==
According to the Water Framework Directive of the European Union the lagoons of Lazio are transitional waters, "partly saline" but "influenced by freshwater flows." Although the geology is the same in this case the ecology is far from it. Transitional waters tend to be biodiverse; each case is a "habitat island" due to variability of the environmental, or abiotic, factors from locality to locality. The ecotomes, or transitional communities created, are unique.

In 2008 a group of scientists from the University of Salento published a study of biodiversity in 26 Italian lagoons. They compared "the taxonomic composition of benthic macro-invertebrate guilds" in the lakes, where a guild is a group of taxa that subsist in the same way. The 944 taxa included 343 families. Any two lakes can be given a percentage similarity based on the number of taxa they contain in common. Using the methods of cladistics the investigators constructed a cladogram of lagoons, grouping them by similarity. The "Central Tyrrhenian Lagoons;" that is, those of coastal Lazio, are divided into two groups: Lake Caprolace with Lake Fusaro, and Lake Fondi, Lake Lungo, Lake Sabaudia, Lake Monaci and Lake Fogliano.

Of the second group, Fondi and Lungo, both of the South Pontino, were most like each other. The other lakes of that group are all of Agro Pontino. All similarities were considered low; only two lagoons overall shared more than 50% of the families. In essence, each lagoon contains its own characteristic species, with a slight similarity for geographic proximity.

== See also ==
- Fondi
