= Günther Zainer =

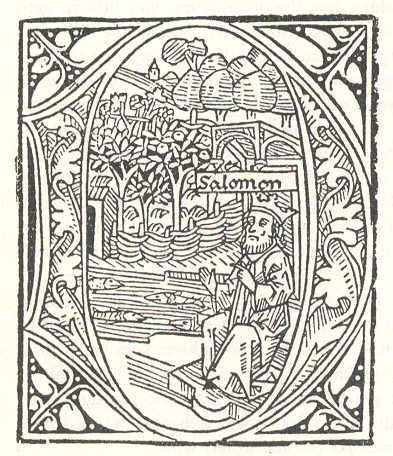
Initial from the German Bible, printed by Zainer in Augsburg in 1477

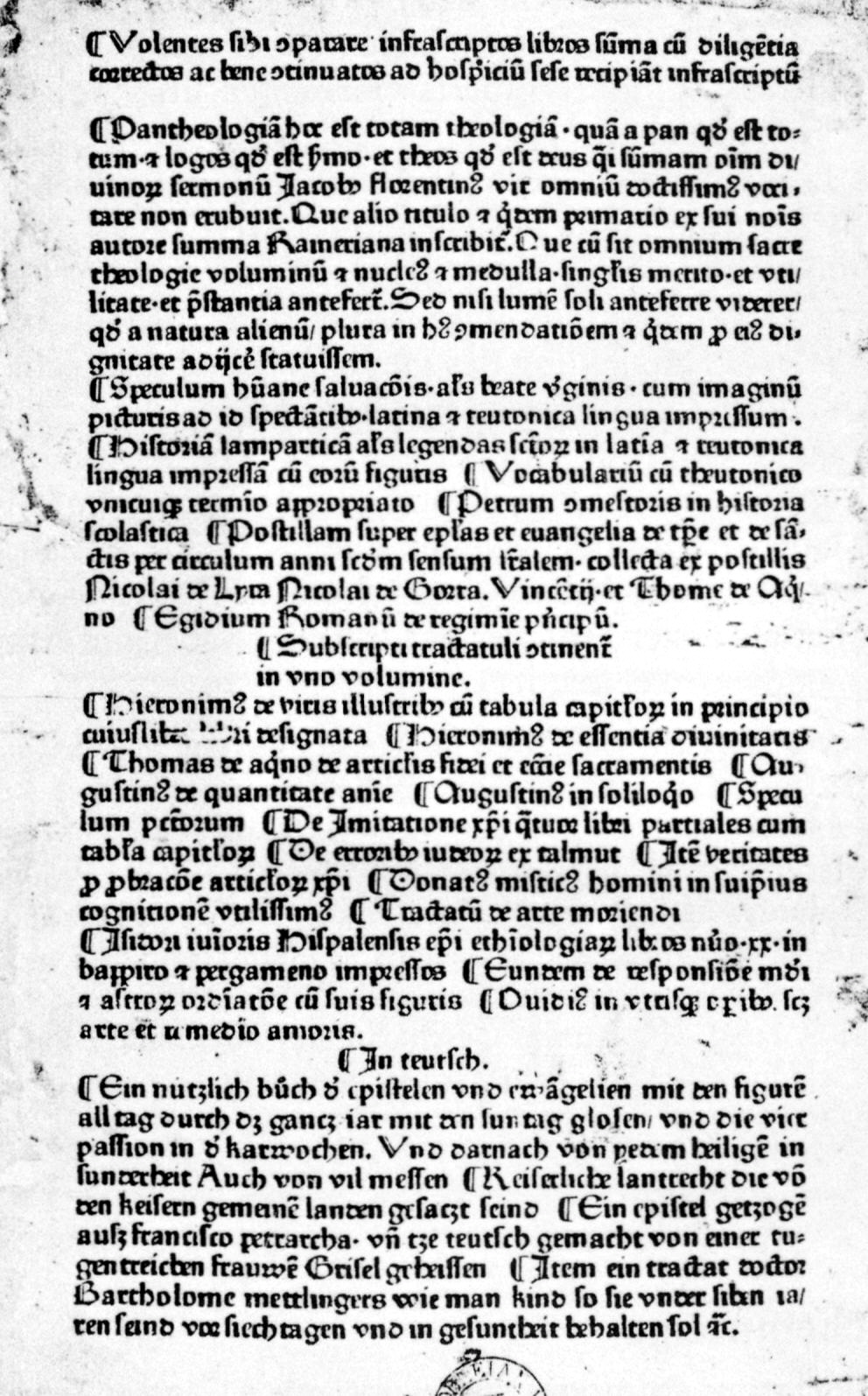
Printed list of works printed by Zainer, ca. 1480

Günther Zainer (or Zeyner or Zeiner) (died 1 October 1478) was the first printer in Augsburg, where he worked from 1468 until his death; he produced about 80 books including two German editions of the Bible and the first printed calendar. He came to Augsburg from Strassburg and printed in 1472–76 three large works of moral instruction. He also printed the first large illustrated book, Jacobus de Voragine's Legenda aurea in 2 volumes with 131 woodcuts, 1471–76. Johann Zainer, the first printer in Ulm, was probably his brother.

== Life ==
Günther Zainer was related to Johann Zainer, a printer at Ulm, perhaps his brother. In 1463 he married Agnes Krieg at Straßburg and was a painter and goldsmith in that town. He probably learnt to print from Johannes Mentelin. In 1468 he began to print in Augsburg. In 1472 he was a burger of Augsburg. Zainer was one of the printers of the new printing shop in the Augsburg St. Ulrich's and St. Afra's Abbey.

== Works ==
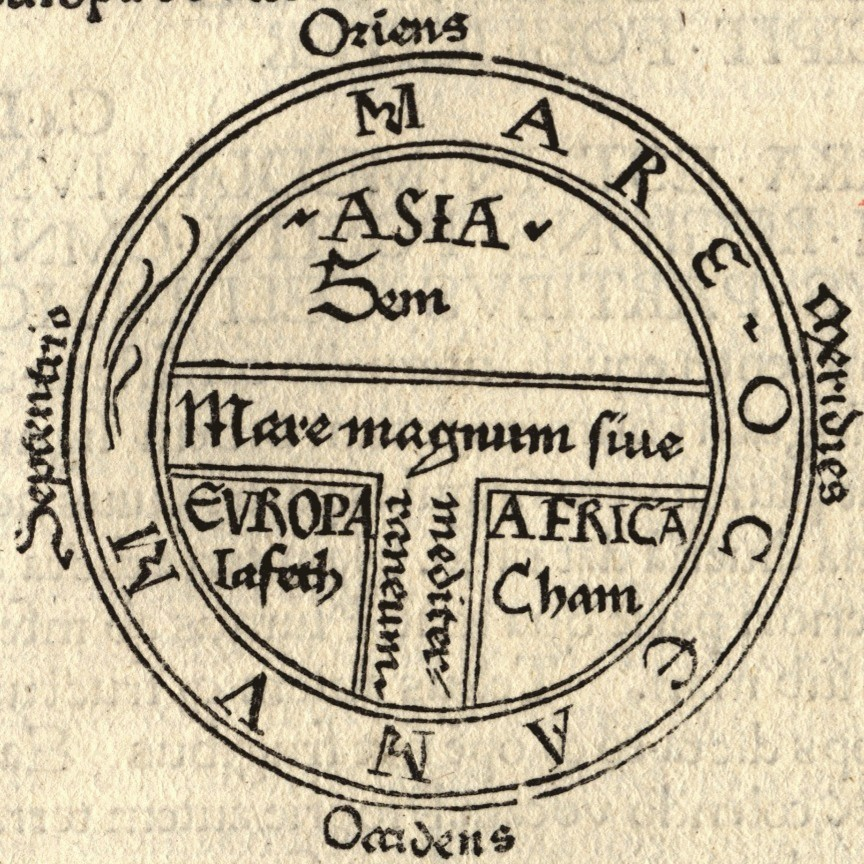
Earliest printed example of a classical T and O map (by Günther Zainer, Augsburg, 1472), illustrating the first page of chapter XIV of the Etymologiae of Isidore of Seville (it shows the continents as domains of the sons of Noah: Sem (Shem), Iafeth (Japheth) and Cham (Ham)).

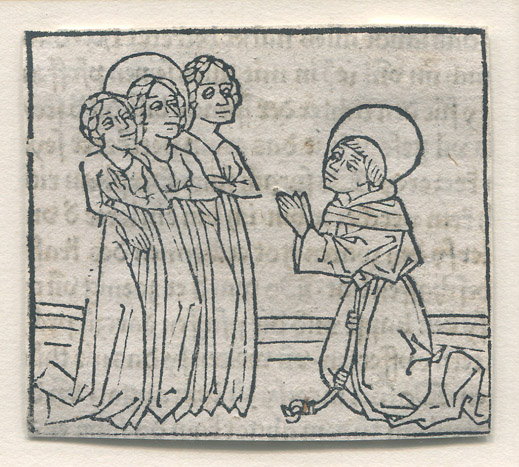
Early woodcut print of a saint kneeling before three women by Zainer, circa 1473.

About 80 books are known to have been printed by Zainer, of which most were for the use of the clergy. Zainer also printed popular literature in German, works on building and medicine and calendars.

In 1468 Meditationes vitae domini was the first book he is known to have printed. The German edition of the Legenda Aurea of Jacobus de Voragine, was the first illustrated book he printed. In 1471/72 Zainer made the first printed edition of the extremely popular Der Heiligen Leben. In 1472 appeared the Etymologiae of Isidore of Seville About 1475 he printed a German edition of the Bible, with a second edition in 1477.

Günther Zainer’s printing was of high quality, as to paper, presswork and typefaces: 32 illustrated books and broadsides with altogether 100 illustrations testify to his interest in decoration. His first German Bible is decorated with 73 ornamental initials.

== Bibliography ==
- Falkenstein, Karl: Geschichte der Buchdruckerkunst in ihrer Entstehung und Ausbildung. Leipzig 1840; p. 157
- Funke, Fritz: Buchkunde. München-Pullach 1969; pp. 86; 164; 226; 228
