= Palazzolo (Rome) =

Hill in Rome

Coordinates: 41°54′2.5″N 12°27′33.3″E

- Hill of Rome
- Latin name: Palatiolum
- Italian name: Palazzolo
- Rione: Borgo
- Buildings: Pontificio Collegio Urbano di Propaganda Fide
- Churches: Santi Michele e Magno
- Events: Conquest of Rome by Henry IV of Germany

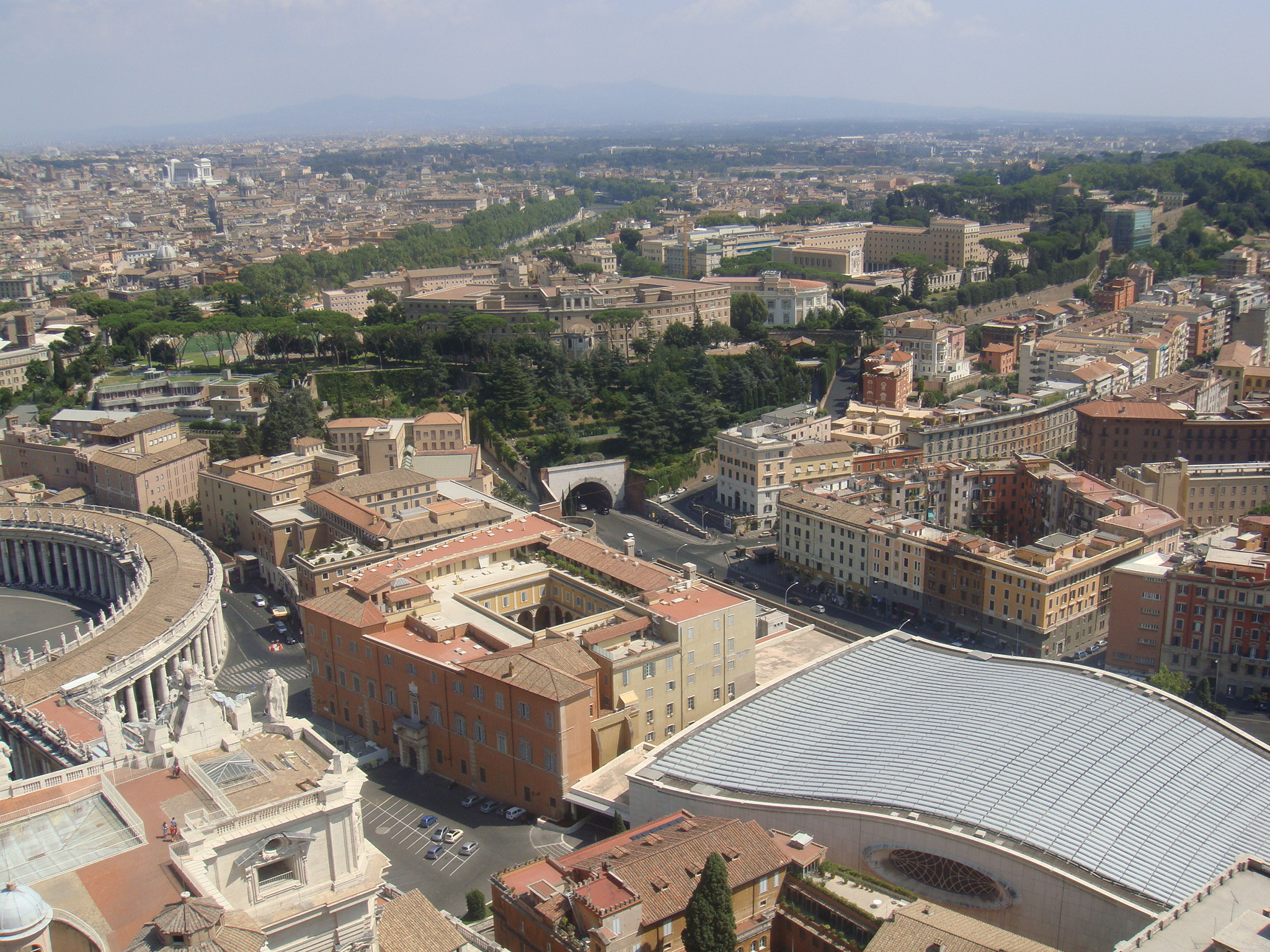
The Palazzolo (the hill to the center-left in the background crowned by umbrella pines) seen from St. Peter's Dome

Palazzolo (or Palazzola, in Latin Palatiolum) is the extreme northern offshoot of the Janiculum Hill which stretches towards Vatican Hill, in the Borgo rione, in Rome.

== Etymology ==
The toponym comes from some Roman ruins located on the hill, called "Palatiolum Neronis", because they are believed to be the remains of a small palace owned by Nero. In the Middle Ages it was also called "mons Neronis", Palaceolum or Palazzola. It is mentioned twice in the etching Grande Veduta del Tempio e del Palazzo Vaticano engraved by Giovanni Maggi and Giacomo Mascardi in 1615, and published by Father Ehrle.

== History ==
The Palatiolum, on whose slopes in the Middle Ages extended the two settlements - the latter fortified - of the Schola Frisiorum (for the frisian pilgrims) and of the Burgus Saxonum (for the Saxon pilgrims), is mentioned for the first time in 1053, when it is cited a "fundum quod vocatur palatiolum" (Latin: a farm which is named little palace). The classical Roman structures were fortified on this occasion by Holy Roman Emperor Henry IV of Germany, who left a garrison of four hundred knights commanded by Ulrich of Godesheim. During the Middle Ages on the hill stood the church of Santa Maria in palazzolo.

The church, which was located "in Civitate Leonina in Monte S. Michaelis", with reference to the Church of the Santi Michele e Magno, national church of the Frisians located on the northern slopes of the hill and still existing, was demolished in the fifteenth century to make way for the vigna Cesi, later vigna Barberini.

Until the end of the nineteenth century the hill was also called by the populace "la palazzina", because there lay a small villa (Italian: palazzina), outbuilding of the Santa Maria della Pietà psychiatric hospital. Because of this, the hill's name was for the Romans synonymous with "madhouse".

== Sources ==
- Paolo dello Mastro (1875) [1431-1484]. Achille De Antonis (ed.). Memoriale di Paolo di Benedetto di Cola dello Mastro dello Rione de Ponte (in Italian). Roma: F. Capaccini.
- Ferdinand Gregorovius (1873). Storia della Città di Roma nel Medioevo (in Italian). Vol. IV. Venezia: Giuseppe Antonelli.
- Umberto Gnoli (1984) [1939]. Topografia e toponomastica di Roma medioevale e moderna (in Italian). Foligno: Edizioni dell'Arquata.
- Castagnoli, Ferdinando; Cecchelli, Carlo; Giovannoni, Gustavo; Zocca, Mario (1958). Topografia e urbanistica di Roma (in Italian). Bologna: Cappelli.
- Delli, Sergio (1988). Le strade di Roma (in Italian). Roma: Newton & Compton.
