= Fondi =

- Comune
- Comune di Fondi
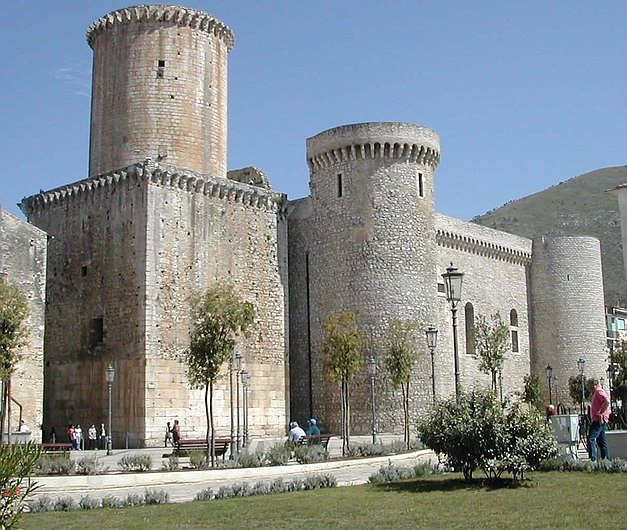
- Castle of Fondi.

- Coat of arms

- Location within Italy Location within Lazio
- Coordinates: 41°21′N 13°25′E
- Country: Italy
- Region: Lazio
- Province: Latina (LT)
- Frazioni: Cocuruzzo, Curtignano, Fasana, Gegni, Passignano, Querce, Rene, Rio Claro, Salto di Fondi, San Magno, San Raffaele, Sant'Andrea, Sant'Oliva, Selva Vetere, Vardito

Government
  - Mayor: Beniamino Maschietto (Forza Italia)

Area
  - Total: 142 km^{2} (55 sq mi)
- Elevation: 8 m (26 ft)

Population (30 November 2017)
  - Total: 39,762
  - Density: 280/km^{2} (725/sq mi)
- Demonym: Fondani
- Time zone: UTC+1 (CET)
  - Summer (DST): UTC+2 (CEST)
- Postal code: 04022
- Dialing code: 0771
- Patron saint: St. Honoratus of Fondi
- Saint day: 10 October
- Website: Official website

Fondi (Latin: Fundi; Southern Laziale: Fùnn) is a city and comune in the province of Latina, Lazio, central Italy, halfway between Rome and Naples. As of 2017, the city had a population of 39,800. The city has experienced steady population growth since the early 2000s, though this has slowed in recent years.

Before the construction of the highway between the latter cities in the late 1950s, Fondi had been an important settlement on the Roman Via Appia, which was the main connection from Rome to much of southern Italy.

== Geography ==
Fondi is the main town of the Plain of Fondi (Piana di Fondi in Italian), a small plain between the Ausoni and Aurunci mountains and the Tyrrhenian Sea. The plain includes three lakes and is agriculturally very fertile. Most in evidence are greenhouses for the production of early crops for sale in Rome. The 15-kilometre (9 mi) long sandy beach stretches from Sperlonga in the south-east to Terracina in the north-west and lies along the Gulf of Gaeta, with views (when the weather is clear) to the Pontine Islands. It is marked by a somehow well-preserved, typical Mediterranean coastal dune landscape.

The territory of Fondi is partially included in the Regional Natural Park of Monti Aurunci.

== History ==
Fondi has an ancient history, beginning with early settlements about 1000 BC: later the area was settled by the Italic tribes of Aurunci and, subsequently, Volsci. According to the legend, it would have been founded by Hercules in memory of the killing of Cacus.

The first historical reference to Fondi dates to 338 BC, at the time of the Latin War, when its inhabitants (together with those of the nearby Formia) gained minor Roman citizenship status (civitas sine suffragio). After a failed attempt of revolt led by Vitruvius Vaccus (330 BC), Fondi remained a Roman prefecture; later (188 BC) it received full citizenship, with a government led by 3 aediles.

The importance of Fondi lay in its position across the old Via Appia. Begun in 312 BC, it was for more than two millennia the main roadway from Rome to southern Italy. Today the historical centre and surrounding wall of Fondi still form a square, as in the Roman camp walls, whose decumanus was formed by the city tract of the Via Appia.

Pope Soter was born in the city around the turn of the first and second centuries.

After the Gothic War and the Lombard conquest of Italy, Fondi remained a dominion of the Eastern Roman Empire. Later a part of the Papal States, in 846 it was burnt out by the Saracens coming from their fortress of Garigliano: they settled there until they were defeated in the Battle of Circeus of 877, and Fondi was passed to the Duchy of Gaeta.

In 1140 Fondi passed to the Dell'Aquila family, of Norman heritage, and then, in 1299, to the powerful Caetani barons (in the person of Loffredo Caetani, nephew of Pope Boniface VIII), who for two centuries made Fondi the centre of their power, and a centre of artistic development as well. Here in 1378 the powerful Count Onorato I Caetani summoned the conclave in which the cardinals elected Clement VII against Urban VI (Western Schism).

The Caetani lost Fondi after Charles VIII of France's expedition to southern Italy, and it was assigned to the condottiero Prospero Colonna. Under the Colonna the city met another period of artistic and cultural splendour, thanks of the court held by Giulia Gonzaga, who lived in Fondi between 1526 and 1534.

In 1534, Fondi was sacked by Barbarossa, who was seeking to kidnap the beautiful Giulia and bring her as a gift to his emperor Suleiman. However, she managed to escape, but many other inhabitants were enslaved in the Barbary slave trade. Another sack followed in 1594, starting the decline of the city, which had in the meantime passed to the Carafa of Stigliano. In 1720 Fondi was acquired by the di Sangro family.

In 1818 the declining city, surrounded by malaria-infested marshes malaria and brigandage, lost the bishopric seat existing there since the very early years of Christianity.

After the Armistice of 8 September 1943, the anti-Fascist novelist Alberto Moravia and his wife Elsa Morante took refuge in Fondi; the experience inspired Moravia's book La Ciociara ("The Woman from Ciociaria") (1958).

== Economy ==
Agriculture in the area around Fondi has always been favoured by the presence of abundant water sources and by the climatic conditions. The traditional production of citrus has been recently supplanted by that of vegetables and fruit of all kinds.

Fondi is the seat of an important market for agriculture and food products which distribute millions of tons of agricultural products every year.

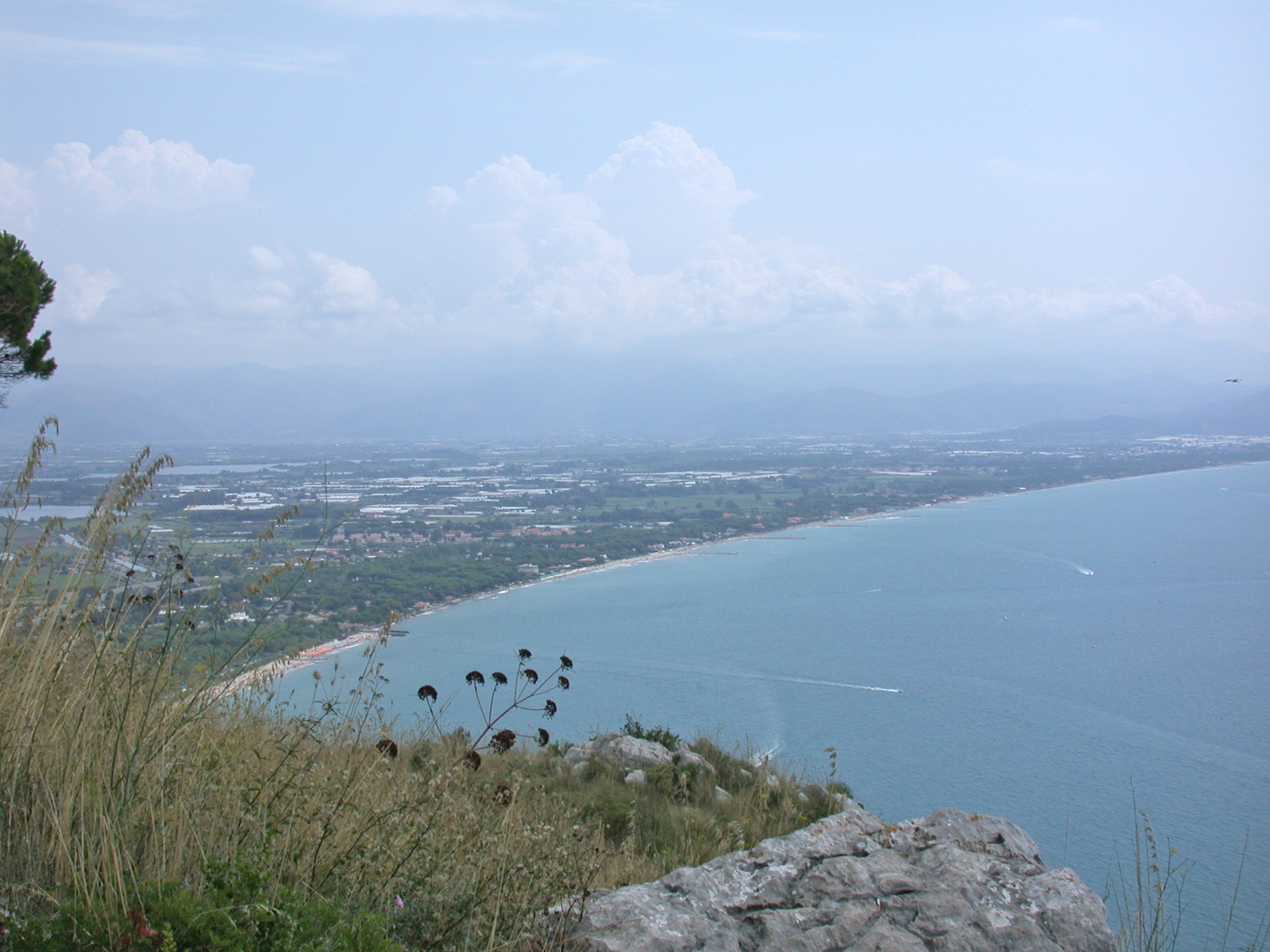
The Fondi seaside and plain towards Terracina.

== Main sights ==
Fondi's main sights include:

- The Castle, with a characteristic round tower standing more than 30 metres (98 ft), symbol of the city. The castle was built in the 14th century by Onorato I Caetani over a stretch of ancient Roman walls. In the 16th century it was the seat of Giulia Gonzaga's court of literates and artists. Since 1987 it houses the city's Museum.
- The adjacent Palazzo del Principe ("Prince's Palace"), constructed in 1466–77 is attributed to the Catalan architect Matteo Forcimanya. Its portals, the mullioned window, the court and the loggiato form a synthesis of Catalan-Gothic and Angevine architectures.
- The Cathedral of St. Peter (Duomo, 14th century) is built over a Roman edifice identified as a temple of Jupiter. It houses the sepulchre of Cristoforo Caetani, a marble bishop cathedra and Cosmatesque pulpit from the 13th century, an Annunciation Tryptych by Cristoforo Scacco and Majesty with St. Peter and St. Paul by Antoniazzo Romano.
- The Collegiata di Santa Maria Assunta, preceded by a wide staircase and built in the 15th century by Onorato II Caetani. It has a Latin cross plant, with an aisle and two naves: main points of interests are a cyborium from 1491 and the venerated statue of the Madonna of the Sky.
- The medieval churches of San Domenico and San Francesco.
- Abbey of San Magno, Fondi

== Twin towns – sister cities ==
Fondi is twinned with:

- Dachau, Germany

== See also ==
- Unicusano Fondi Calcio
- Caetani
- Giulia Gonzaga
- Lake Fondi

== Sources ==
- Di Fazio, M. (2006). "Fondi ed il suo territorio in età romana. Profilo di storia economica e sociale". British Archaeological Reports. Oxford.
- Piscitelli Carpino, M.T. (2002). Fondi tra Antichità e Medioevo. Naples.
