= Santi Michele e Magno, Rome =

Church of St. Michael and St. Magnus
- Friezetsjerke (in West Frisian); Friezenkerk (in Dutch)
- Chiesa dei Santi Michele e Magno (in Italian)
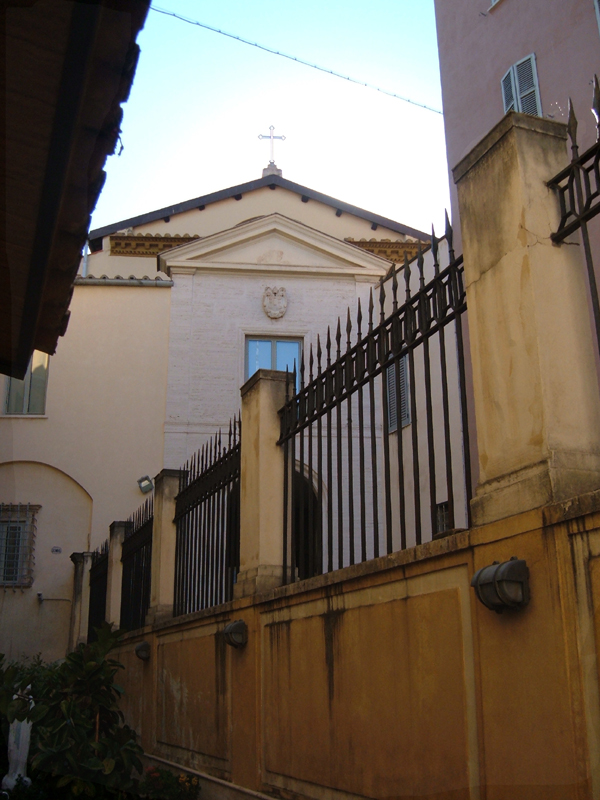
- The church
- Click on the map for a fullscreen view
- 41°54′5.26″N 12°27′32.26″E
- Location: Palazzolo (Rome)
- Country: Italy
- Denomination: Roman Catholic
- Tradition: Roman Rite
- Website: www.friezenkerk.nl

History
- Status: national church of the Netherlands

Architecture
- Architect: François Desjardins
- Architectural type: Church
- Style: Baroque
- Groundbreaking: 1141

Specifications
- Length: 28 metres (92 ft)
- Width: 12 metres (39 ft)
- Height: 20 metres (66 ft)

The Church of Saints Michael and Magnus (Italian: Santi Michele e Magno, West Frisian: Friezetsjerke, Dutch: Friezenkerk) is a Roman Catholic church in Rome, Italy, dedicated to Saint Michael the Archangel and the Bishop Saint Magnus of Anagni. It lies on the northern slope of the Palazzolo hill, in Rione Borgo, near the Vatican, and is the national church dedicated to the Netherlands. It is also known as the "Church of the Frisians" (Dutch: Kerk van de Friezen). In 1989, the church was granted to the Dutch community in Rome. A 19th century source calls the church Santi Michele e Magno in Sassia, due to a location on a Vico dei Sassoni.

== History ==
The first Frisians were converted to Christianity in the 8th century by Saint Willibrord, known as the "Apostle to the Frisians" in the modern Netherlands. The Northumbrian missionary crossed the North Sea with eleven companions to bring the Gospel. From that time on, Frisian pilgrims regularly visited Rome. The old name for the people from the Low Countries who came to Rome has remained in use ever since.

A colony of Frisians was living in Rome as early as the 8th century. The Schola of the Frisians is mentioned at the time of Pope Leo III's return to Rome in 799, at Charlemagne's visit in 800 and by Louis II of Italy in 844. In 845, the Frisians and the inhabitants of the other scholae defended Old St. Peter's Basilica and its neighborhood against a Saracen invasion. The schola was plundered nonetheless. Shortly after, the neighborhood was surrounded by a wall, remains of which can still be seen. Any pilgrim from the Frisian territory who came to Rome would stay in the Frisian hospice, the closest to the St Peter's.

The church is built against the slope of the Gianicolo hill. Thanks to its location it was preserved in the 16th century when all the buildings at the bottom of the hill were demolished for the construction of St. Peter's Basilica. The Church of the Frisians is the only existing building that reminds us directly of the scholae, built around the tomb of St. Peter. No remains of the small settlement's original church survive. Its patron saint was St Michael the Archangel, who liberated Rome from the plague and was a saint favored during the Lombard Kingdom of Italy.

In 1989, the church was granted to the Dutch community in Rome. Mass is celebrated in Dutch every Sunday.

== Description ==
The original church was destroyed during the Sack by the Normans in 1084. In 1141 the new and bigger church was built. It was a Romanesque building, with old columns, and a beautiful bell tower. This bell tower is still admirable, but the church looks very different from when it was built. It was at this time that Saint Magnus of Anagni, whose remains were believed to have been translated to the church in the 9th century, was added as a patron. The events appear to be related to the investiture controversy, when the pope fled to his summer residence at Anagni, where another set of the saint's relics had long been kept. According to a 13th-century plaque, three Frisian warriors and a holy virgin had saved the relics from the Saracens. When they tried to bring them to Frisia, the initiative was stopped by Pope Leo IV, who allowed them to take only some minor relics. Since then, the Saint's corps remained in Rome. His forearm ended in Esens (East Frisia), where it was carried around in processions during the third quarter of the 12th century. A subsequent tradition identified the saint as a Frisian standard bearer called Magnus Forteman. In 1446, Pope Eugene IV deprived the Frisians of the perpetual right to the church.

In the eighteenth and nineteenth century, the interior was transformed to the extent that only small Romanesque details remain visible.

There are two fragments of a tombstone of a Frisian knight called Hebus, who died in 1004 in Rome at the age of 90.

The church has hosted two important relics since the 1990s. These are the stone where Jesus was dedicated in the Temple, known as the Presentation of Jesus at the Temple, and the stone where Abraham bound Isaac. These stones were previously kept in the nearby church of San Giacomo Scossacavalli, destroyed in 1937. The former stone is now used as the main altar of the church.

== Scala Sancta ==
The church's Scala Sancta is to be found in lateral chapel, renovated in 2000.

== Burials ==
- Tomb of Anton Raphael Mengs, designed by Vincenzo Pacetti.

== See also ==
- Frisia
- Willibrord

== Sources ==
- De Blaauw, Sible (1977), The medieval church of San Michele dei Frisoni, Papers of the Netherlands Institute in Rome - Mededelingen van het Nederlands Instituut te Rome, Uitgeverij Van Gorcum, pp. 151–165, ISBN 90-232-2887-1
- Pope John Paul II (1995-11-12). "Dedicazione Del Nuovo Altare Nella Chiesa Dei Santi Michele e Magno" (in Italian).
- Muskens, M. P. M. (1994), De Kerk van de Friezen bij het graf van Petrus: de geschiedenis van de kerk, de kerk in de geschiedenis (in Dutch), Willibrordcentrum, ISBN 88-7621-791-6
- "Geschiedenis Friezenkerk" (in Dutch).
- Official website of the vicariate of Rome - Chiesa Annessa Santi Michele e Magno
- Gigli, Laura (1994). Guide rionali di Roma (in Italian). Vol. Borgo (IV). Roma: Fratelli Palombi Editori. ISSN 0393-2710.
