= Bruno (bishop of Segni) =

Italian Roman Catholic saint

Saint Bruno O.S.B.
- Bishop of Segni
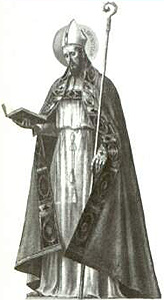
- Church: Catholic Church
- Diocese: Segni
- See: Segni
- Appointed: 1079
- Term ended: 18 July 1123
- Predecessor: Erasmo
- Successor: Trasmondo
- Previous posts: Canon of the Siena Cathedral (1073-1079); Abbot of Montecassino (1107-1111)

Orders
- Consecration: 1080 by Pope Gregory VII
- Rank: Bishop

Personal details
- Born: Bruno c. 1045 Solero, Kingdom of Italy
- Died: 18 July 1123 (aged 78) Segni, Papal States
- Buried: Cattedrale Santa Maria Assunta, Piazza Santa Maria, Segni, Italy

Sainthood
- Feast day: 18 July
- Venerated in: Catholic Church
- Canonized: 5 September 1181; Segni, Papal States by Pope Lucius III
- Attributes: Benedictine habit; Episcopal attire; Pastoral staff
- Patronage: Segni

Bruno di Segni (c. 1045 – 18 July 1123) was an Italian Roman Catholic prelate and professed member from the Order of Saint Benedict who served as Bishop of Segni and Abbot of Montecassino. He studied under the Benedictines in Bologna before being appointed a canon of the cathedral chapter of Siena. He was invited to Rome, where he became a bishop and counseled four consecutive popes. He served as Abbot of Montecassino but when he criticised Pope Paschal II regarding the Concordat of Ponte Mammolo in 1111 the pope relieved him of his duties as abbot and ordered Bruno to return to his diocese, where he died just over a decade later. Bruno's canonization was celebrated on 5 September 1181 under Pope Lucius III, who presided over the celebration in the late bishop's diocese.

== Life ==
=== Early career ===
Bruno was born circa 1045 in Solero either to nobles or parents of modest means named Andrea and Guglielmina. He spent his theological education in the Benedictine house of Santa Perpetua near his town in Asti and at the University of Bologna where he also studied humanities and the liberal arts. It was around this time that he wrote one of his earliest works, Expositio in psalterium Gallicanum, dedicated to his bishop, Ingo of Asti (1072-1079). Bruno became a canon in Siena in 1073, and recollects his life among the canons; perhaps his ordination to the priesthood is to be located in the same period, and around that time was assigned as a pastor there. This happened after he decided to enter the Abbey of Montecassino to be a monk, but during the trip, he fell ill in Siena, where he remained subject to the needs of Bishop Rudolfus (1073–1083), who named Bruno as a canon of the cathedral Chapter.

=== Episcopate ===
Bruno became noted for his defending orthodoxy and for his extensive knowledge of Sacred Scripture and great piety. He was in Rome in 1079, and participated in the Sixth Roman Synod of Pope Gregory VII in February 1079. He was one of those who spoke on the floor of the Synod on the theory of transubstantiation and the theology of the Blessed Sacrament, against the teaching of Berengarius of Tours; at the synod, Berengarius renounced his heresy and was absolved by Pope Gregory. In Rome he was a guest of Pietro Igneo, the Bishop of Albano. Pope Gregory appointed the Bishop of Albano to go to Segni with Bruno, and to persuade the canons of the cathedral Chapter to elect Bruno as their bishop. Bruno was appointed as the Bishop of Segni In 1079, after the canons of the cathedral of Segni selected him. Pope Gregory VII himself, a good friend of Bruno who often sought his counsel, consecrated him a bishop.

According to Peter the Deacon, when the previous bishop of Segni, Erasmus, came to die, the pope asked Bruno to step in as administrator of the Church of Segni. As is traditional in such cases, Bruno pleaded his unworthiness and attempted to refuse. The pope was determined, however, and Bruno set off for Segni. In the meantime, the pope sent a mitre to the leaders of the church at Segni, ordering them to have Bruno consecrated as their bishop. When Bruno realized what was going on, he attempted to flee. Still, on the road in the middle of the night, he met a lady dressed in imperial regalia whose face shone like the sun (a personification of the Church of Segni), who chided him for fleeing from his bride. Struck by this, Bruno returned and allowed himself to be consecrated bishop.

During May and June 1081, the Emperor-elect Henry IV brought his army and his Clement III (Wibert of Ravenna) to the neighbourhood of Rome, and besieged the city. He had to withdraw to the north in the summer, but next year he returned and spent the entire Lenten season. At one of these times, Bruno was travelling from Segni to Rome when Adolfo di Segni, a supporter of Henry IV, who was ambitious to become Lord of Segni in place of the bishop, seized and imprisoned Bruno for three months. He was freed and returned to Rome. King Henry returned at the end of 1082 for a seven-month siege, during which fierce fighting in and around the Leonine City forced Pope Gregory to seek refuge in the Castel Sant' Angelo. Bruno was imprisoned once more, in the Castel Sant'Angelo alongside the pope. Hartmuth Hoffmann remarks that it is doubtful that during the following decade, he would have had the opportunity to deal with his own diocese as usual.

Bishop Bruno of Segni attended the eighth Roman synod of Pope Gregory VII, on 4 May 1082.

=== Career in Roman curia ===
Pope Victor III (1086–1087) named him the Librarian of the Holy Roman Church, and he held the position until he left for Montecassino in 1099. By 1 July 1089, Cardinal Giovanni Gaetani, Cardinal Deacon of S. Maria in Cosmedin, was papal chancellor.

Pope Urban II was elected on 12 March 1088. Bishop Bruno accompanied Pope Urban on his tour of southern Italy, and was present at Salerno on 14 January 1093, where he subscribed a grant of privileges to Abbot Peter of Cava. On 24 August 1093, he was present at the monastery of S. Maria de Panso, a dependency of Montecassino, where the pope consecrated the major church, and Bruno consecrated the chapel in the cloister. He subscribed a papal document dated 6 February 1094 at Santa Maria Nuova in Rome; he also subscribed on 19 March and 5 April.

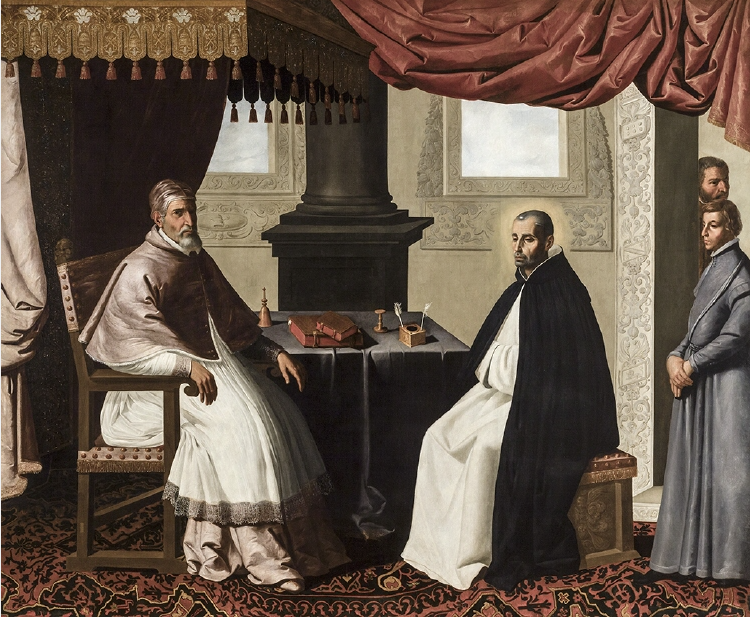
Zurbarán : S. Bruno and Pope Urban II oil on canvas c. 1630

In 1095, Pope Urban was invited by Countess Matilda of Tuscany to visit her domains. Urban held a council at Piacenza during the first week of March, and was gratified and encouraged by the reception he received from every quarter. He was determined to carry his crusade into France, his homeland. Bruno had connections to Pope Urban II, and is found in the papal entourage at Tarascon near Avignon on 11 September 1095, at Avignon on 13 September, and at Cluny on 25 October. Bishop Bruno accompanied the pope to the Council of Clermont on 18 November 1095, where the First Crusade was inaugurated. After the council, Bruno accompanied the pope to Limoges from 23–31 December. On 31 December, the pope consecrated the new basilica in the monastery of S. Martial, and Bishop Bruno was present. The papal party then proceeded to Charroux before going on to Poitiers on 22 January 1096. Bruno accompanied Urban II to Moyenmoutier, near Tours, where, on 3 March, he was invited to consecrate the capella infirmorum. They were at Tours from 3–25 March, where the pope held a synod; and then to Poitiers again from 29–31 March. Their last two destinations were Nîmes on 12 July, where Pope Urban held a synod, and Saint-Gilles on 20 July. In August 1096, the papal suite began its return to Italy and was in Asti on 9 September; they reached Rome by Christmas.

Pope Urban II died in Rome on 29 July 1099, and was succeeded on 13 August 1099 by Cardinal Rainerius da Bieda, who took the name Paschal II.

=== Bruno and Paschal II ===
In the summer of 1100, Pope Paschal embarked on a tour of southern Italy. Bishop Bruno accompanied him and subscribed a papal privilege for the benefit of Abbot Peter of Cava at Salerno on 30 August 1100.

Bernhard Gigalski argues that it was in the second half of 1102, perhaps between August and December, that Bishop Bruno entered the monastic state at Montecassino. Bruno had accompanied Pope Paschal on his trip to Benevento and had taken part in Paschal's synod there. During the trip, he became seriously ill and decided to resign from his secular pursuits and enter the cloister. He points to the statement in the anonymous life (IV. 5) that it had been five years (quinquennio peracto) after his entry that Bruno was elected abbot on 13 November 1107. Peter the Deacon of Montecassino adds that the people of Segni were put out by Bruno's decision, and complained to Pope Paschal. The pope sent messengers to Bruno, ordering him to "take care of his sheep" and to always be available to the pope for ecclesiastical matters; he also demanded to know why Bruno had retired to a monastery without papal permission. Bruno refused the pope and the people of Segni, which caused the pope to ask Abbot Oderisius of Montecassino to allow Bruno to serve the Roman church for forty days every year.

Pope Paschal visited Civita Castellana in September and early October 1105. Bruno subscribed a bull confirming Henricus in the office of provost of S. Donato on 8 September.

He served as a legate to France twice in 1104 and 1106. He undertook a mission to the Kingdom of France along with Prince Bohemond I of Antioch for Pope Paschal II in 1106, and held a council at Poitiers on 25 June 1106. The principal purpose of the mission was the preaching of the crusade. The pope spent the first two weeks of November 1106 in Parma, and on 2 November 1106 Bishop Bruno of Segni subscribed . He remained with the pope for several months after his return to Italy before returning to his cloister.

Abbot Oderisius died on 2 December 1105 and was succeeded by Abbot Otto, who died on 1 October 1107. Forty-four days later, on 13 November 1107, Bruno of Segni was elected abbot of Montecassino.

In October 1108, Pope Paschal visited Montecassino on his way to Benevento. Bruno accompanied Pope Paschal to attend the synod. In the synod, he repeated his objections to lay investiture, and he forbade clerics from wearing expensive secular clothes. He also consecrated Landolfo as Archbishop of Benevento on 8 November 1108.

Bruno was present in Segni on 4 June 1109, to welcome the pope who had come to celebrate the canonization of Bruno's old friend Pietro di Anagni. Bruno is credited with having written the postulatio. Peter, a Crusader and church builder, had died only four years earlier.

Pope Paschal did not object to the pluralism inherent in Bruno's episcopal and abbatial offices until Bruno condemned the pope for signing the Concordat of Ponte Mammolo in 1111. The pope and sixteen cardinals, including Bishop Pietro of Porto, had held captive for sixty-one days, while King Henry V pressed the pope to agree to his solution to the investiture controversy. To persuade the king to a compromise, Paschal granted the emperor a privilegium in the matter of investiture. On 18 April, at Ponte Mammolo on the Anio River, the cardinals who were prisoners along with the pope were compelled to sign the papal promise to observe the agreement which Henry had drawn up. The privilegium was immediately denounced in all quarters. Bruno was minded to write a letter directly to Pope Paschal, complaining that he had heard that his enemies were telling Paschal that he was speaking badly about the pope; he condemned the treaty entered into so treacherously; he asked Paschal to confirm once again his apostolic constitution against investiture. When the bishops of Lucca and Parma and the ministers of the Camaldolese and Vallombrosian chapters asked his views on investiture as heresy and what the pope was thinking, Bruno imprudently wrote that the pope did not like him and did not consult him, but that he himself continued to follow the policy of Gregory VII and Urban II. He invited his correspondents to share his statements with whomever they wished. At a council held at the Lateran in March 1112, Paschal was compelled to retract his grant and modify his opinions in the investiture controversy. Bishop-Abbot Bruno, a vigorous opponent of investiture in any case, was present at the Lateran council of 1112. He made his opinion public in an extreme way in the Lateran synod of March 1116. Paschal gave another speech justifying his conduct, and Bruno arose to say, "Let us praise God and give Him thanks, because our lord and head repents that he had subscribed to that heresy." This produced an uproar, challenging Bruno's claim that investiture was heretical and asserting that Paschal had come to an agreement with King Henry under duress.

=== Return to the diocese ===
Bruno's chastising of the pope led to Paschal II, in turn, chastising Bruno for shirking his duties and obliging him to resign his position as abbot of Montecassino and return to Segni as its bishop. Paschal sent a letter to the monks of Montecassino, ordering them to cease their obedience to Bruno and to proceed to elect a new abbot. Abbot Bruno departed Montecassino on 13 October 1111, and was succeeded by Abbot Gerardus on 17 October 1111.

Bruno once made a serious error when he claimed that priests who committed simoniacal acts could not perform the Sacraments, but he was proven to be wrong since it did not undo the sacrament of ordination despite how severe it was.

When Pope Paschal died on 21 January 1118, he was succeeded by Paschal's chancellor and supporter, Cardinal Giovanni Gaetani (Gelasius II, which left Bruno's situation unchanged. The signing of the Concordat of Worms on 23 September 1122, and its ratification by Pope Calixtus II at the First Lateran Council on 27–30 March 1123, ended the discussion over lay investiture.

Bishop Bruno died at Segni in mid-1123, on 3 July or 31 August, and was buried in the cathedral. His feast day as a saint, 18 July, is sometimes taken as his date of death.

=== Cardinal ? ===
There is a dispute as to whether or not Bruno had been made a cardinal. It is said that he declined the cardinalate. At the same time, other sources suggest he had been made the Cardinal-Bishop of Segni even though the suburbicarian diocese had not existed at that stage. Some scholars suggest that Urban II named him a cardinal in 1086, while others believe that he was named a cardinal on 18 July 1079.

== Works ==
Bruno's published works are considered to be exegetical for the most part. He condemned simoniacal practices in a document written before 1109 entitled Libellus de simoniacis. He authored commentaries on the Book of Job and the Psalms as well as on the four Gospels. Bruno also wrote on the lives of Pope Leo IX and Pietro di Anagni. 145 homilies of his are still preserved.

His works are collected in: J. P. Migne (ed.), Patrologiae Latinae Collectio, Vols. CLXIV and CLXV.

An anonymous "Life of Bruno" (also called "Acta Brunonis") was written in the second half of the 12th century.

== Sainthood ==
Bruno's canonization was celebrated under Pope Lucius III on 5 September 1181 in Segni. He is considered the patron saint of Segni. In 1584, a special Office of the liturgy in his honour was approved by Pope Gregory XIII.

== See also ==
- Bishops of Segni

== Bibliography ==
- Bruno of Segni, "Epistola IV" (complete version), ed. G. Fransen, in: "Réflexions sur l'étude des collections canoniques à l'occasion de l'édition d'une lettre de Bruno de Segni," (in French) Studi Gregoriani 9 (1972), pp. 515–533.
- Gigalski, Bernhard (1898). Bruno, Bischof von Segni, Abt von Monte-Cassino (1049-1123): sein Leben und seine Schriften: ein Beitrag zur Kirchengeschichte im Zeitalter des Investiturstreites und zur theologischen Litteraturgeschichte des Mittelalters. (in German) Kirchengeschichtliche Studien; 3. Bd., 4. Heft. Münster: H. Schöningh, 1898.
- Grégoire, Réginald (1965) Bruno di Segni, exégète médiéval et théologien monastique (in French) Spoleto: Centro Italiano di Studi sull'Alto Medioevo: 1965.
- Grégoire, Réginald (1970). "Note Sur Bruno de Segni". (in French) Recherches de Théologie Ancienne et Médiévale, vol. 37, Peeters Publishers, 1970, pp. 138–142.
- Hoffmann, Hartmuth (1972). "Bruno di Segni." (in Italian) Dizionario biografico degli Italiani 14 (1972), pp. 644–645.
- Hüls, Rudolf (1977), Kardinal, Klerus und Kirchen Roms: 1049-1130 (in German). Tübingen: Max Niemeyer 1977. pp. 129–130.
- Jaffé, Philipp, Regesta Pontificum Romanorum ab condita ecclesia ad annum p. Chr. n. 1198 (in Latin); 2nd ed. by S. Löwenfeld, F. Kaltenbrunner, P. Ewald Vol 1. Leipzig, 1888.
- Robinson, I. S. (1983). "'Political Allegory' in the Biblical Exegesis of Bruno of Segni." Recherches de Théologie Ancienne et Médiévale, vol. 50, Peeters Publishers, 1983, pp. 69–98.
- Rüthing, Heinrich (1969). "Untersuchungen zum ersten Psalmenkommentar Brunos von Segni." (in German) Recherches de Théologie Ancienne et Médiévale, vol. 36, Peeters Publishers, 1969, pp. 46–77.
- Schieffer, T. (1935). Die päpstlichen Legaten in Frankreich vom Vertrag von Meersen (870) bis zum Schisma von 1130. Berlin 1935, pp. 175–178.
- Sollerio, Joannes Baptista (1725). "De S. Brunone episcopo".(in Latin) Acta Sanctorum Julii Tomus IV (Antwerp: Jacobus de Moulin), pp. 471–488.
- Zafarina, L. (1966), "Sul « conventus » del clero rotonano nel maggio 1082," Studi medievali n.s., 7 (1966) pp. 399–403.
