= Legendary (hagiography) =

Collection of biographies of holy figures

A legendary (Latin: legendarius) is a collection of saints' lives. The word derives from the Latin word legenda, meaning 'things to be read'. The first legendaries were manuscripts written in the Middle Ages, including collections such as the South English legendaries or the Golden Legend.

Bollandist Hippolyte Delehaye describes a legend (as compared to a fable, myth, or tale) thus: "The legend, on the other hand, has, of necessity, some historical or topographical connection. It refers imaginary events to some real personage, or it localises romantic stories in some definite spot. Thus one may speak of the legend of Alexander or of Caesar." Hagiography (accounts of the lives of saints) is not intended to be history, but aims at edification, and sometimes incorporates subjective elements along with facts.

== Terminology ==
Legends presuppose an historical fact as basis or pretext. This historical fact may be modified by popular imagination. "Both elements maybe combined in very unequal proportions, and according as the preponderance is to be found on the side of fact or on that of fiction, the narrative may be classed as history or as legend."

The legenda (literally, that which is for reading) included facts which were historically genuine, as well as narrative which Christians now class as unhistorical legend. The term is a creation of the Middle Ages, and has its source in the reading of the prayers used in religious services. Since the days of the martyrs, the Catholic Church recalled to mind her famous dead in the prayers of the Mass and in the Office, by commemorating the names noted in the martyrologies and making mention of incidents in their lives and martyrdom. When the lectio became a matter of precept, the reading matter in the office for the day became in a precise sense legenda (that which must be read).

After the 13th century, the word legenda was regarded as the equivalent of vita (Life) and passio (suffering), and, in the 15th century, the liber lectionarius is comprised under what is known as "legend". Thus, historically considered, legend is the received story of the saints. A "legendary", in Christian literature, is a collection of biographies of saints or other holy figures. The pre-eminent example of the form is the mid-thirteenth-century Legenda aurea or 'Golden Legend', which contained a large number of saints' lives, organised according to the liturgical year. The genre fell into decline following the Reformation.

== History ==
The development of the legend is the result of the introduction of the subjective element into the realm of fact. Every one understands a story in a different fashion and repeats it in their own way. Heroic figures succeed one another, and the latest inherits all the greatness of their predecessors. The Passion of Sergius and Bacchus was based on an earlier lost passion of Juventinus and Maximinus. The author took material from the stories of martyrs of Julian's time rather than that of Galerius.

Hagiographic writing is not intended to be history. It is of a religious character and aims at edification. Inspired by devotion to the saints, it is intended to promote that devotion. As early as the fourth century, Christian writers augmented Josephus' histories with hagiographic and legendary material. Athanasius of Alexandria's Life of Antony is a continuation of the genre of secular Greek biography.

=== Early medieval embellishment ===
Gregory of Tours (d. 594) was acquainted with the apocryphal lives of the Apostles. At the beginning of the 7th century we already find related in Gaul (in the "Passio Tergeminorum" of Warnahar of Langres), as an incident in the local history of Langres, a story of martyrdom originating in Cappadocia.

The cults of saints venerated in Rome spread throughout Europe, partly by the report of pilgrims, and partly through the adoption of service books reflecting the Roman liturgy. Bede's "Martyrology" and Aldhelm of Malmesbury (d. 709) indicate a wide knowledge of this foreign literature. The legends of the "saviour" make their appearance in the Merovingian 7th century up to the middle of the 8th.

=== High Middle Ages ===
The 12th century brings with the new religious orders the contemplative legends of Mary. The thirteenth sees the development of the cities and the citizens, hand in hand with which goes the popularization of the legend by means of collections compiled for the purposes of sermons, vit sanctorum, exempla, or merely to give entertainment. Cæsarius of Heisterbach compiled of a book of hagiography, the Dialogus miraculorum (c. 1219–1223), a collection of 746 miracle stories. James of Vitry wrote about the holy life of the Beguines of Liège, in particular his Life of Marie d'Oignies. Thomas of Chantimpré authored various hagiographical texts, mostly mystical biographies on holy women, all linked to the territory of modern Belgium. In this century also arise the legends of Mary and, in connection with the new feast of Corpus Christi (1264), a strong interest in tales of miracles relating to the Host.

There are only variations of the old concepts of transformation and apparitions, as in the innumerable stories which now circulated of visible incarnation of the Divine Child or of the Crucified One, or of the monstrance being suspended in the air. But the continuity of the concepts is quite evident in the case of the legends of Mary. If in one legend of Mary, the Blessed Virgin put a ring on the hand of her betrothed under quite characteristic circumstances, that is nothing else than the Roman local legend of the betrothal of Venus, as it has been preserved by William of Malmesbury and the "Deutsche Kaiserchronik" of the 12th century.

The most important medieval legend collection was the Latin Legenda aurea or Golden Legend. Around 1400, a German legendary called Der Heiligen Leben ('The Lives of Saints') became the dominant legendary in German, 'unparalleled in its overall popularity in the whole of Europe ... Hardly a work of German literature was read by such a wide audience'.

== Early modern Protestant reception ==
The stories of the saints were supplemented and embellished according to popular theological conceptions and inclinations, and the legend became to a large extent fiction. The Protestant Reformation received the legend in this form. On account of the importance which the saints possessed even among Protestants, the legends have remained in use. The edition of the "Vitæ Patrum", which Georg Major published at Wittenberg in 1544 by Martin Luther's orders, closely follows Athanasius, Rufinus, and Jerome, rejecting merely some obvious fantasies and aberrations, such as, for example, were to be seen in the "Vita s. Barbaræ", the "Golden Legend" of the 13th century, or in the "Vita s. Simeonis Stylitæ" of Pseudo-Antonius.

But the legends of the saints shortly disappeared from Protestantism. It is only in the 19th century, that they again find entrance into official Protestantism in connexion with the Oxford Movement in the Church of England, and the attempts of Ferdinand Piper (d. 1899 at Berlin) to revive the popular calendars.

== Catholic continuities ==
In the usage of the Catholic Church, the legend plays the same part to-day as in the Middle Ages, but it was felt that not all the legends were of equal value, and especially that the editions of the lives of the saints were entirely unsatisfactory. It was the Jesuit Heribert Rosweyde of Utrecht who, at the beginning of the 17th century, undertook to remedy matters by referring to the most ancient texts, and by pointing out how the tales developed.

Rosweyde wished merely to correct the old collections; his idea was to treat the martyrologies, beginning with the most ancient, from the philological standpoint. But his scheme was taken up by other Jesuits, and after his death (1629) was carried out on a large scale. This was with an eye also to sectarian opponents, and in defense of the continuity of Catholic teaching and Catholic life. The Acta Sanctorum of the Bollandists became foundational for investigation in hagiography and legend.

== Contemporary attitudes ==
Hagiography is today considered the province of the historian, who must test the value of the sources of the reports. The Roman Breviary officially designates the lesson for the day as lectio, and the Office of Readings used by the Catholic Church includes some accounts of martyrdoms and the lives of the saints. The Second Vatican Council's Constitution on the Sacred Liturgy directed in 1963 that these accounts were "to accord with the facts of history".

The belief in miracles, considered as such, does not affect the historian, who has only to gather the original authorities together and to say: This is what happened, so far as historical science can determine. Hagiographical literature preserves much valuable information not only about religious beliefs and customs but also about daily life, institutions, and events in historical periods for which other evidence is either imprecise or nonexistent.

== Content and sources ==
Then arises as the next task, to indicate;

1. the contents and
2. the sources of legends.

Manifold as the varieties of legends can seem to be, there are fundamentally not so very many different notions utilized. The legend considers the saint as a kind of lord of the elements, who commands the water, rain, fire, mountain, and rock; he changes, enlarges, or diminishes objects; flies through the air; delivers from dungeon and gallows; takes part in battles, and even in martyrdom is invulnerable; animals, the wildest and the most timid, serve him (e.g. the stories of the bear as a beast of burden; the ring in the fish; the frogs becoming silent, etc.); his birth is glorified by a miracle; a voice, or letters, from Heaven proclaim his identity; bells ring of themselves; the heavenly ones enter into personal intercourse with him (betrothal of Mary); he speaks with the dead and beholds heaven, hell, and purgatory; forces the Devil to release people from compacts; he is victorious over dragons; etc. Of all this the authentic Christian narratives know nothing.

But whence then does this world of fantastic concepts arise? All these stories are anticipated by the Greek chroniclers, writers of myths, collectors of strange tales, neo-Platonists, and neo-Pythagoreans. Examples are in the Hellados periegesis of Pausanias, or the codices collected by Photius in his "Bibliotheca".

Great importance was attached to the reports of miracles in antiquity. The legend makes its appearance wherever people endeavoured to form theological concepts, and in its main features it is everywhere the same. Like the myth (the explanatory fable of nature) and the doctrinal fable, it has its independent religious and hortatory importance. The legend claims to show the auxiliary power of the supernatural, and thus indicate to the people a "saviour" in every need. The worshipper of divinity, the hero-worshipper, is assured of the supernatural protection to which he has established a claim.

Hellenism had already recognized this characteristic of the religious fable. Popular illusions found their way from Hellenism to Christianity, whose struggles in the first three centuries certainly produced an abundance of heroes. The genuine Acts of the martyrs (cf., for example, R. Knopf, "Ausgewählte Märtyreracten", Tübingen, 1901; older less scholarly edition in Ruinart, "Acta Martyrum sincera", Paris, 1689, no longer sufficient for scientific research) have in them no popular miracles.

In numerous cases in which Christian saints became the successors of local deities, and Christian worship supplanted the ancient local worship. This explains the great number of similarities between gods and saints. But how was the transference of legends to Christianity consummated? The fact that the Talmud also uses the same ideas, with variations, proves that the guiding thoughts of men during the period of the first spread of Christianity ran in general on parallel lines. For example, Augustine of Hippo (De cura pro mortuis gerenda, xii) and also Gregory the Great (Dialogues, IV, xxxvi) relate of a man, who died by an error of the angel of death and was again restored to life, the same story which is already given by Lucian in his Philopseudes.

Another example is characteristic tale of the impostor, who concealed the money he owed in a hollow stick, gave this stick to the creditor to hold, and then swore that he had given back the money; this tale is found in Conon the Grammarian (at Rome in Cæsar's time), in the Haggadah of the Talmud (Nedarim, 25a), and in the Christian legends of the 13th century in Vincent of Beauvais. The leading ideas of the legends were presumably transferred individually, and appeared later in literary form in the most varied combinations. Not till the 6th century may the literary type of martyr be considered as perfected, and we are subsequently able to verify the literary associations of ideas.

The pre-Christian religious narrative had already worked up old motifs into romances. There arose in Gnostic circles after the 2nd century the apocryphal accounts of the lives of the Apostles, indicating dogmatic prepossessions. The Christian Church combatted these stories, but the opposition of centuries—the Decree of Gelasius in 496 is well-known—was unable to prevent the narratives from becoming unhistorical as to facts.
