= Andrew Stratelates =

3rd-century Syrian Christian martyr and saint

Saint Andrew Stratelates
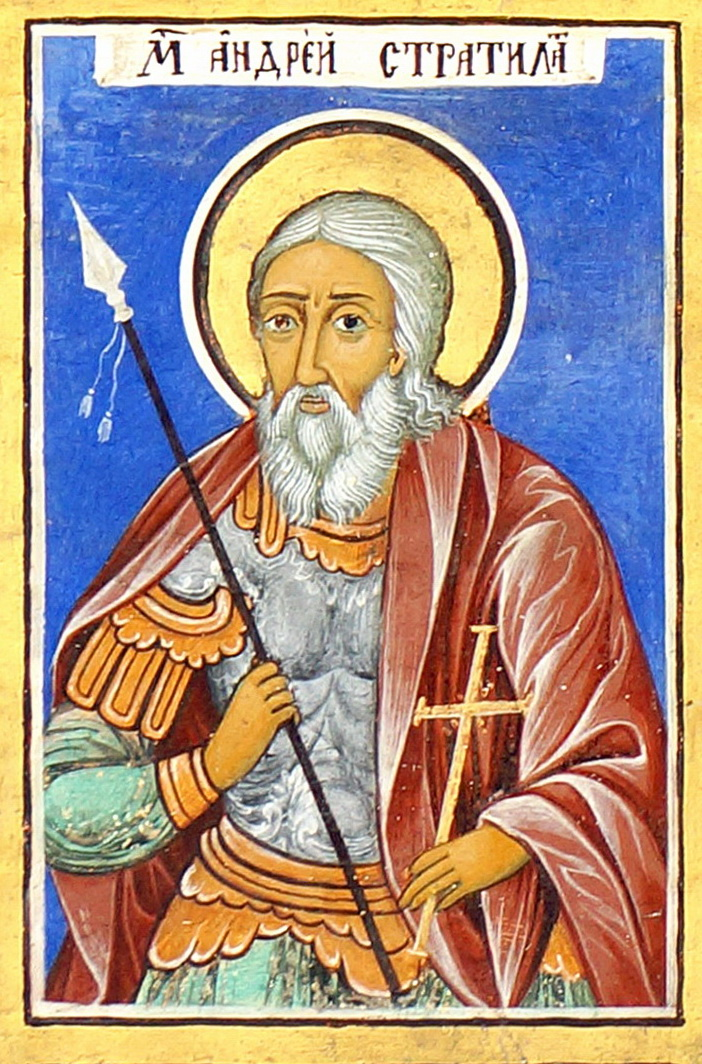
- Icon of Andrew Stratelates

Martyr
- Born: mid-3rd century
- Died: AD 300; Taurus Mountains, Roman Asia Minor
- Venerated in: Catholic Church; Eastern Orthodox Church
- Feast: 19 August
- Attributes: Depicted as soldier holding a Pilum
- Patronage: Syria, army, soldiers

Andrew Stratelates, also known as Andrew the Tribune (Greek: Ἀνδρέας ὁ Στρατηλάτης, tr. Andréas o Stratelátes) or Andrew the Commander is a 3rd-century Roman soldier who is commemorated with his 2,593 soldiers as martyrs by the Catholic Church and the Eastern Orthodox Church on 19 August.

== Life ==
Little is known about his early life except that he was a Syrian by birth and a military commander in the Roman army during the reign of emperor Maximian (284–305). When a large Persian army invaded the Syrian territories, the governor Antiochus entrusted St. Andrew with the command of the Roman army, giving him the title of "Stratelates" ("Commander"). Invoking Christ to aid him and a small detachment of pagan soldiers in battle, St Andrew proceeded against the adversary and routed the numerous host of Persians. Although he gloriously returned to Antioch, having gained a total victory, certain men denounced him to the governor Antiochus, saying that he was a Christian who had converted the soldiers under his command to his faith.

== Trial and death ==
Andrew was summoned to trial and then tortured. Some of his soldiers were crucified while others were locked in prison. Antiochus sent the report of charges to the emperor to decide whether to impose the death sentence upon the imprisoned commander. The emperor, who knew how the army loved St. Andrew, feared a rebellion, thus freeing them, while secretly ordering their execution on different pretexts. St. Andrew went with his faithful soldiers to Tarsus to be baptized by the local bishop Peter and Bishop Nonos of Beroea, but later fled towards mount Taurus after local persecutions in the Cilician city. In a deep gorge inside the mountains, the Roman army ambushed them, slaughtering St. Andrew and all of the 2,593 soldiers that were with him on that day.

== See also ==
- 20,000 Martyrs of Nicomedia
- Forty Martyrs of Sebaste
- Saints Sergius and Bacchus
