= Der Heiligen Leben =

1400 German collection of Saints' biographies

Der Heiligen Leben ('The Lives of Saints'), also known as Passional, was a German legendary, compiled by a Dominican friar from Nürnberg around 1400. Today, 197 manuscripts are known, along with 33 High German and 8 Low German imprints; the oldest imprint is that of Günther Zainer (Augsburg, 1471/72) and the latest is from Strassburg (1521). The 1502 edition had a print run of 1000 copies, an exceptional figure for the time. The collection originally contained 251 legends and became 'the most influential model for most of the vernacular legendaries of the fifteenth century', and was 'unparalleled in its overall popularity in the whole of Europe ... Hardly a work of German literature was read by such a wide audience'.
