= Pietro of Anagni =

Italian Roman Catholic saint

Saint Pietro of Anagni

Bishop of Anagni
- Born: Salerno, Italy
- Died: 3 August 1105
- Venerated in: Catholic Church
- Canonized: 4 June 1109 by Pope Pascal II
- Feast: 3 August

Peter of Anagni (died 3 August 1105) was a Benedictine monk, bishop and papal legate.

Born in Salerno, he entered the Benedictines and so distinguished himself as a monk that Pope Gregory VII appointed him Bishop of Anagni. As bishop, he improved the spiritual welfare of the city and started rebuilding the city's cathedral. He was then sent as papal legate to the Byzantine Empire where he was able to convince Emperor Michael VII Doukas to provide funds and craftsmen to building of the cathedral. The new cathedral also included a hospital where, contrary to modern hospitals, accommodation and care was provided for free not only to the sick but also to travellers. Pietro joined in 1096 the forces of Bohemond of Taranto during the First Crusade on their way to the Holy Land and later returned by way of Constantinople, Palermo and Salerno.

Pietro died on 3 August 1105. He was canonized in 1109 by Pope Paschal II, a mere four years after his death. His feast is on 3 August.
