= Anagni Cathedral =

Catholic cathedral in Anagni, Italy

- Cattedrale di Santa Maria Annunziata; Cattedrale di Anagni
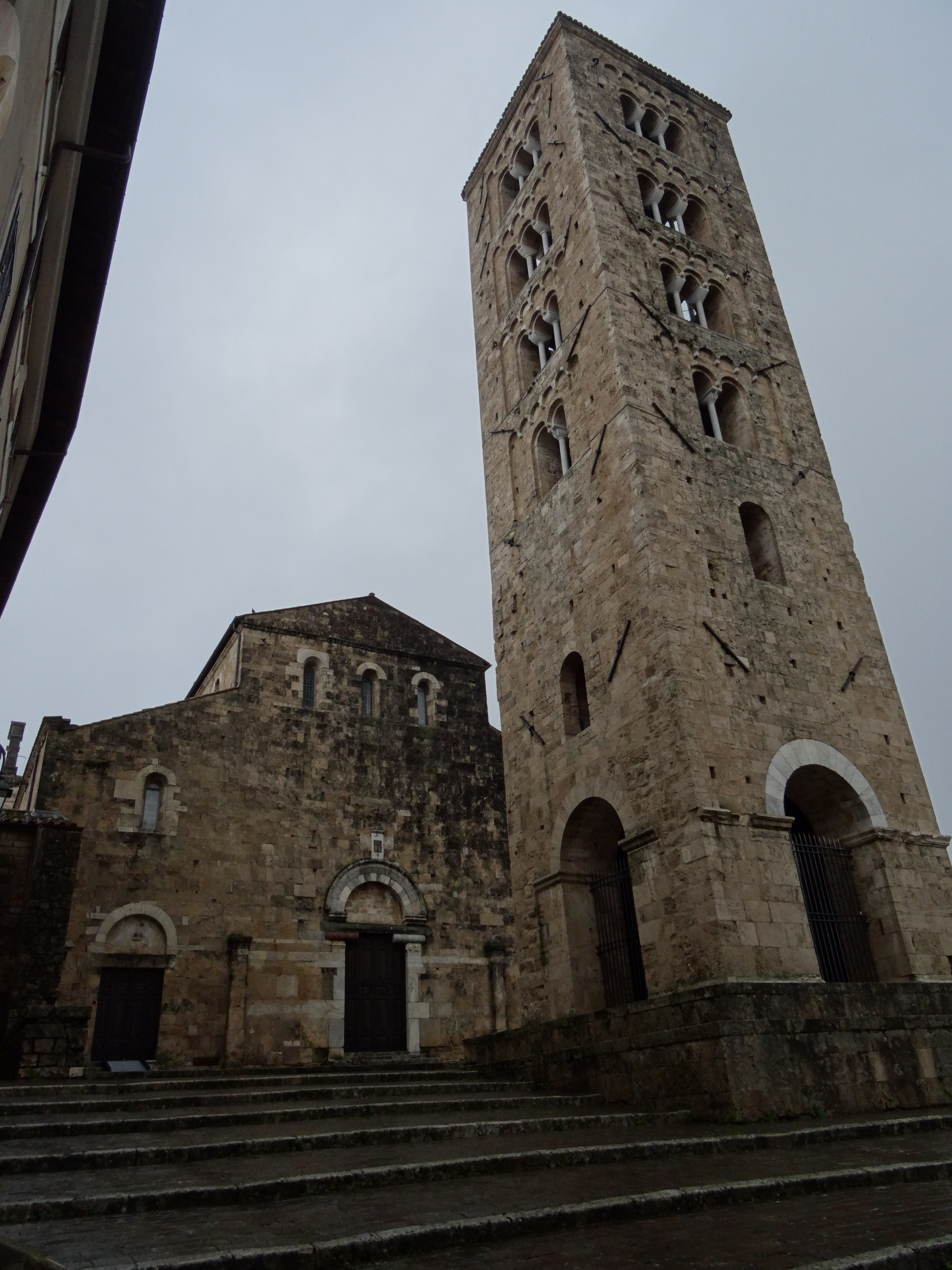

Religion
- Affiliation: Roman Catholic
- Prefecture: Diocese of Anagni-Alatri

Location
- Location: Lazio
- Country: Italy
- Interactive map of Anagni Cathedral
- Prefecture: Diocese of Anagni-Alatri
- Coordinates: 41.74284°N 13.16197°E

Architecture
- Style: Gothic-Lombard
- Founder: Michele VII Ducas
- Groundbreaking: 1072
- Completed: 1104

Website
- http://www.cattedraledianagni.it/

Anagni Cathedral (Italian: Cattedrale di Santa Maria Annunziata; Cattedrale di Anagni) is a Catholic cathedral in Anagni, Lazio, Italy, home to the cathedra of the Diocese of Anagni-Alatri. It is a Marian church dedicated to the Annunciation of the Blessed Virgin Mary.

== History ==
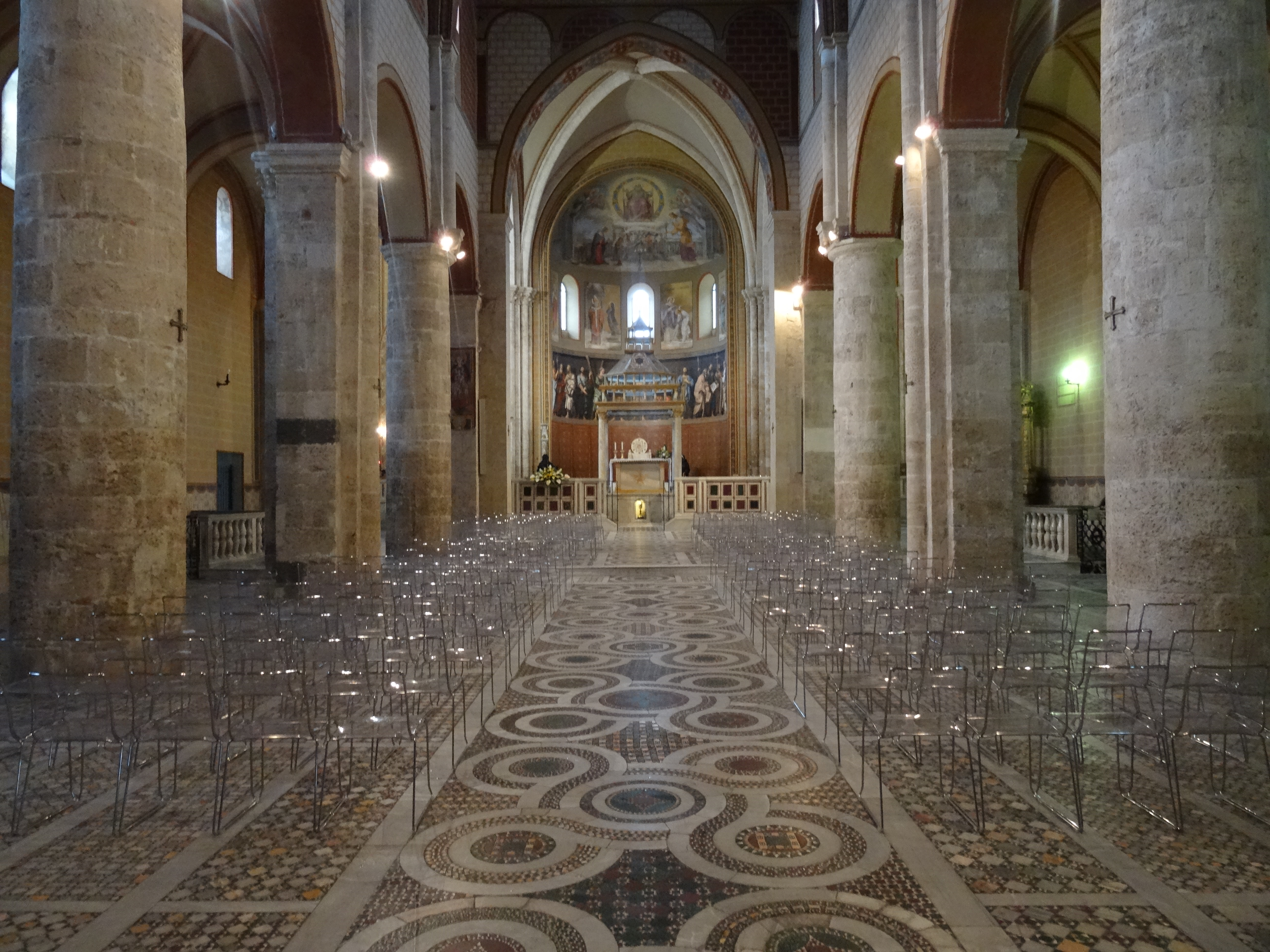
Interior.

The cathedral is the episcopal seat of the Diocese of Anagni-Alatri.

The church was built in a Romanesque-style during 1072-1104 patronized by the Byzantine emperor Michele VII Ducas. Agnani served as the summer residence of the Popes in the 12th and 13th centuries. Bernard of Clairvaux (1174) and Clare of Assisi (1255) were canonized at the cathedral. Frederick Barbarossa was excommunicated here in 1160 by Pope Alexander III.

== Interior ==
The interior is in a Gothic-Lombard style after the refurbishment in 1250. The interior pavement (1231) was set in cosmatesque mosaic. The interior lunette over the main portal depicts the Madonna and child between Saints Magno and Secondina (late 13th century). The ciborium on the main altar was completed by Vassalletto in 1267. The frescoes of the apostles on the apse walls were painted in the 17th century by Borgogna. While the frescoes in the half-dome apse with was completed in the 19th century by Giovanni and Pietro Gagliardi.

There is a wooden triptych of the Saviour in the right nave.

== Crypt ==
A stairwell on the left side of the church descends to the crypt. It is dedicated to St Magnus, the patron saint of Agnani. During the episcopate of Pandulf from 1237 until 1256, the walls were covered with frescoes depicting biblical scenes, many now severely damaged. Likely a number of artists worked in the crypt, including followers of Pietro Cavallini. Behind the altar, below a depiction of Christ and the Madonna is a depiction of St Thomas and other bishops. Other altars are dedicated Saints Secondina, Aurelia, and Neomisia; an altar dedicated to Holy Martyrs; and finally an altar dedicated to Bishop Pietro da Salerno and the Holy Virgin Oliva. The mosaic pavement was completed by the Cosma family in 1231. A narrow passageway leads to the oratory of St Thomas Beckett, also frescoed with stories of the Genesis and other mythical Biblical episodes, saints and other human figures, including a Templar sketchy sinopia.

== Views ==
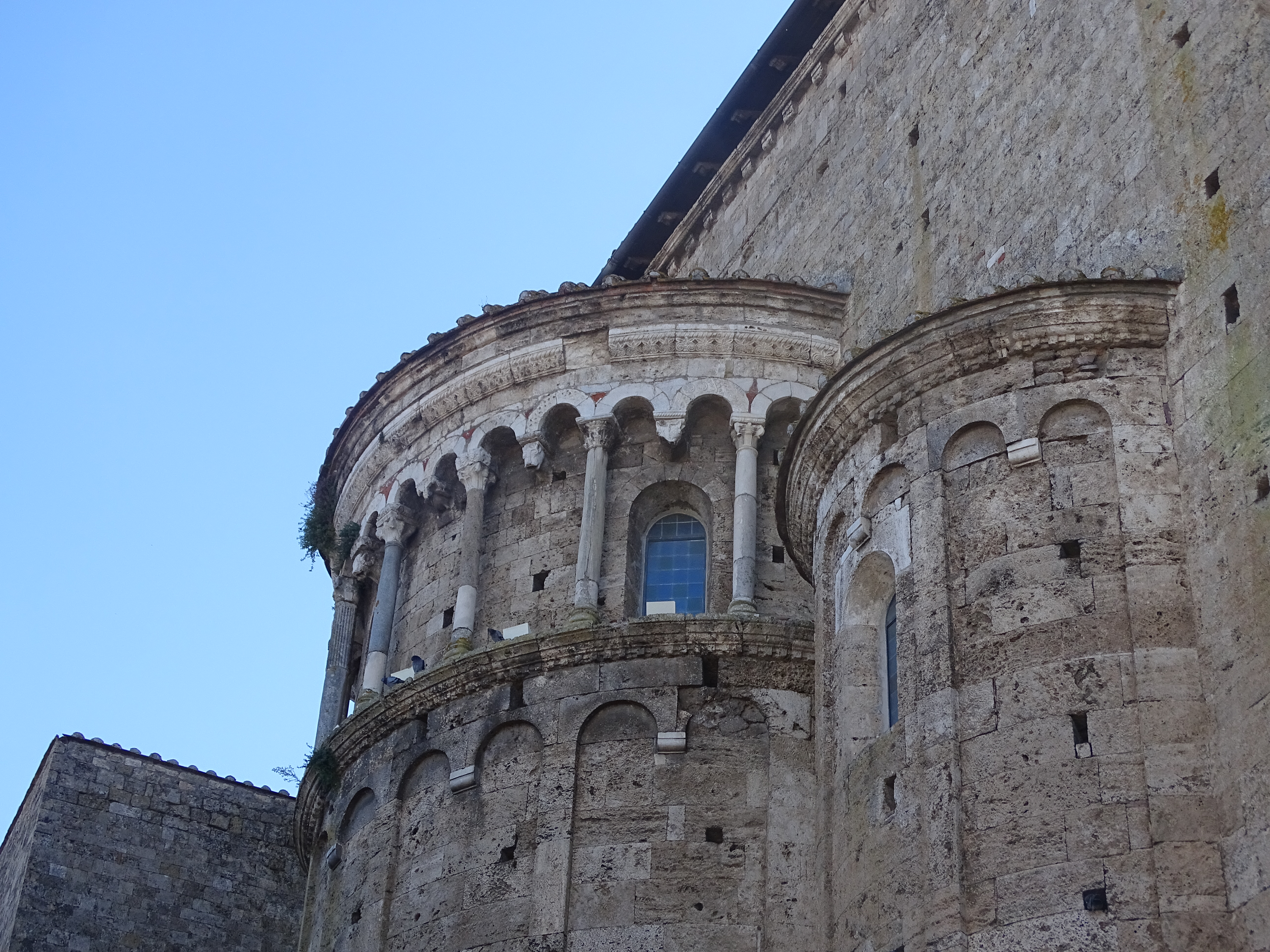
Exterior

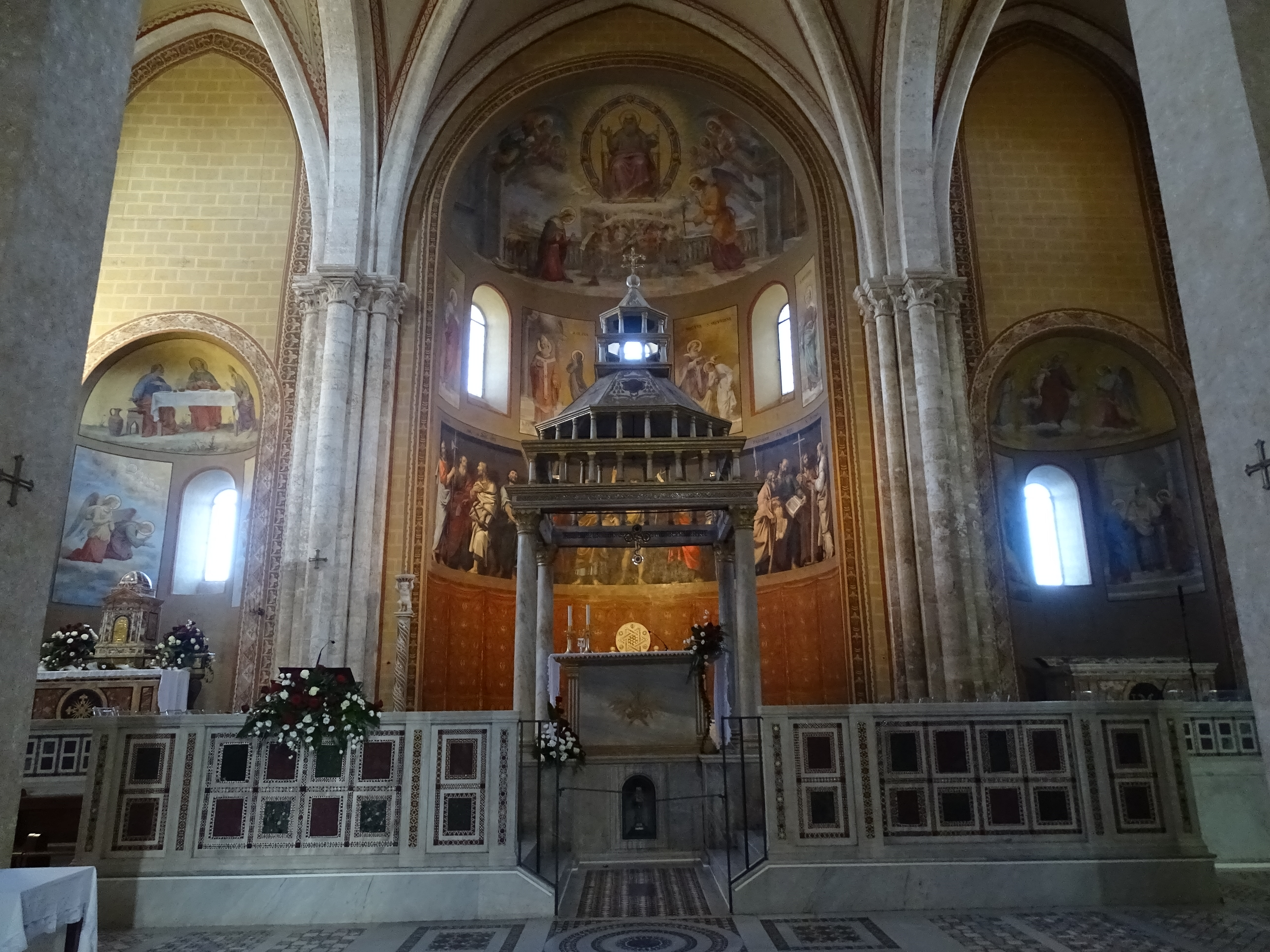
Nave

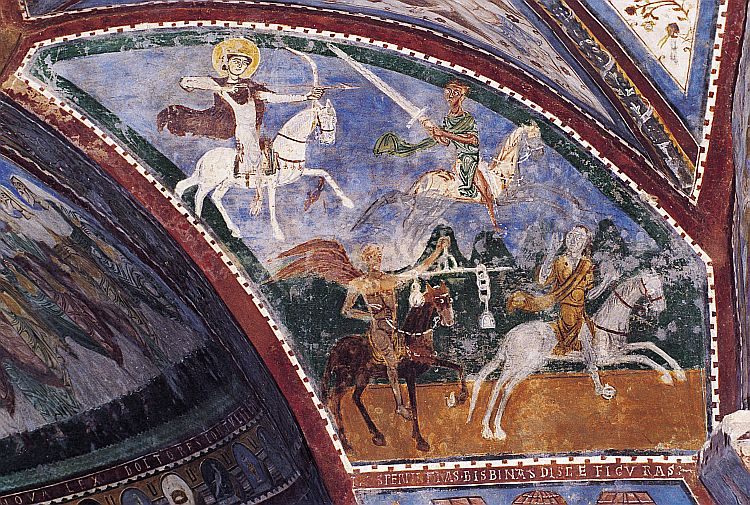
Four Horsemen

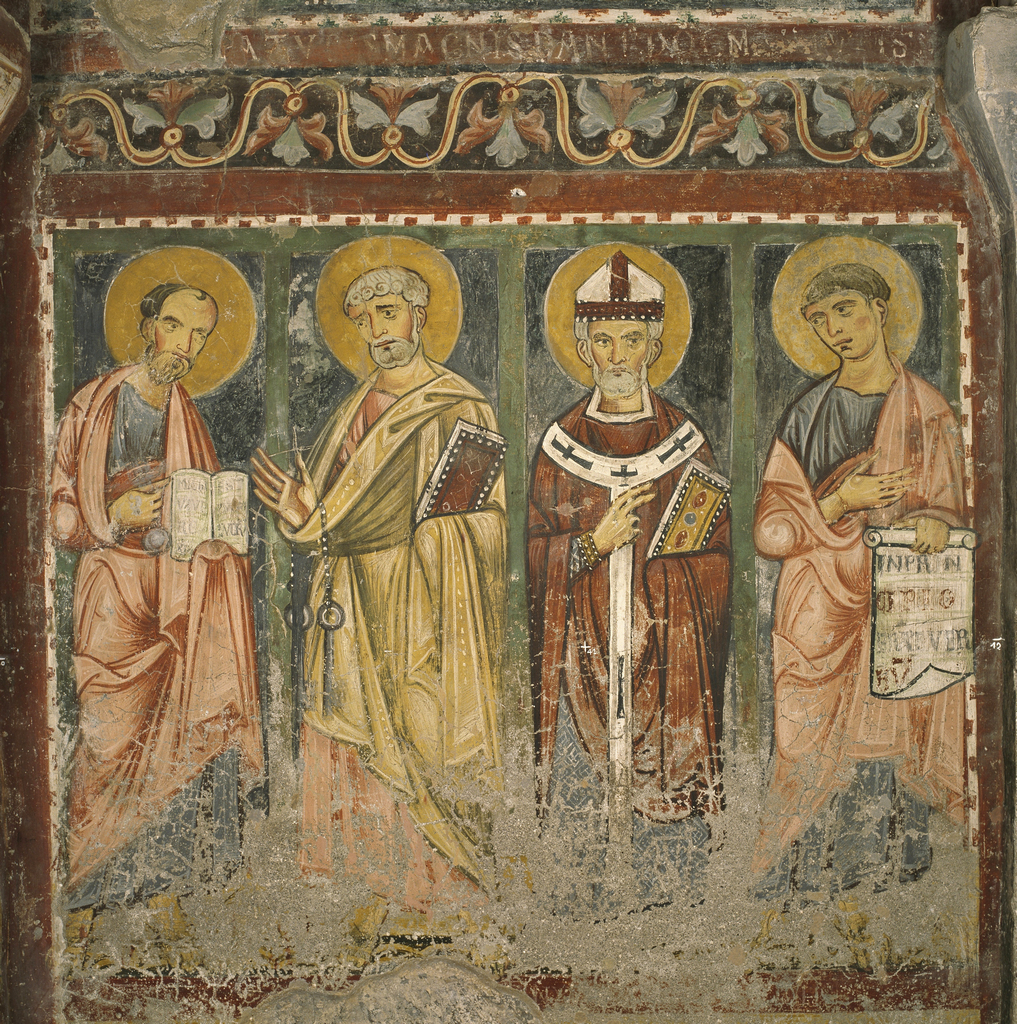
Fresco

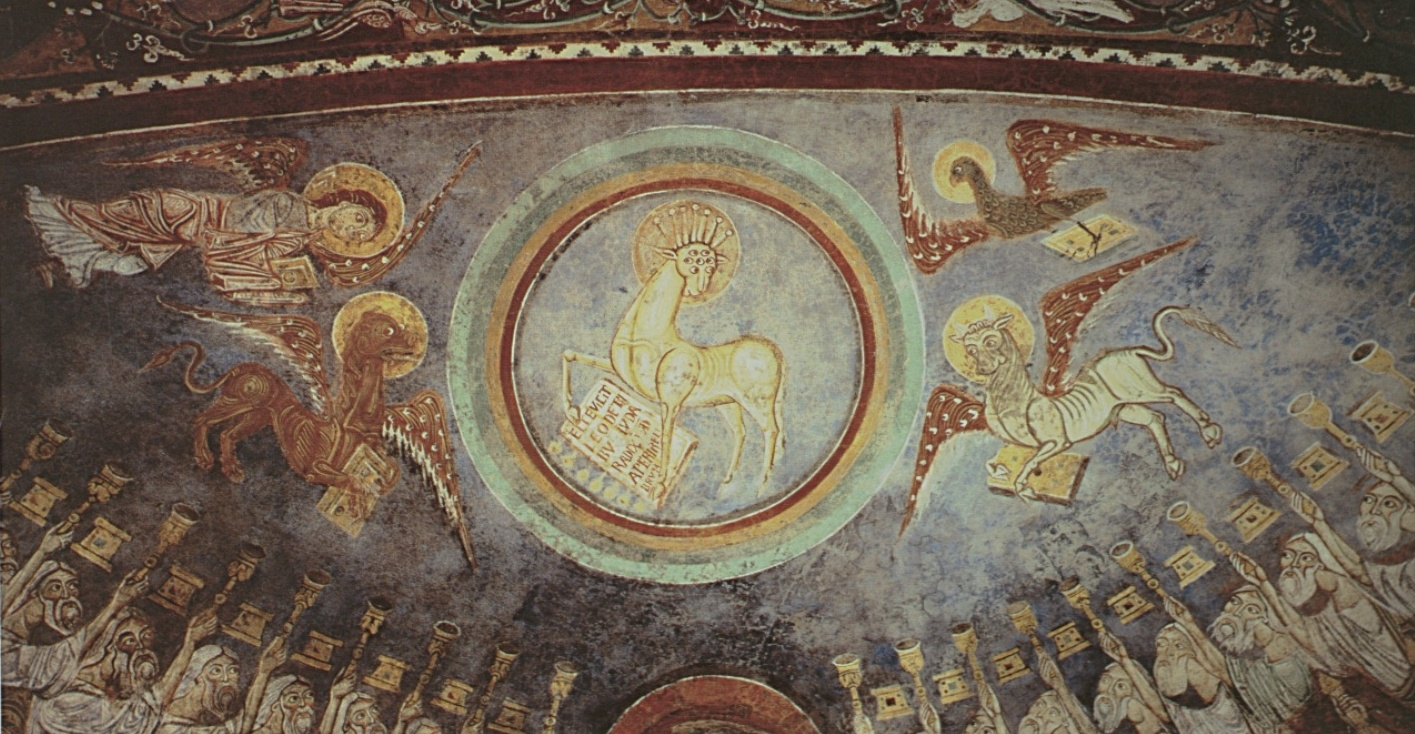
Adoration of the Lamb
