= Caroline Goodson =

Archaeologist and historian

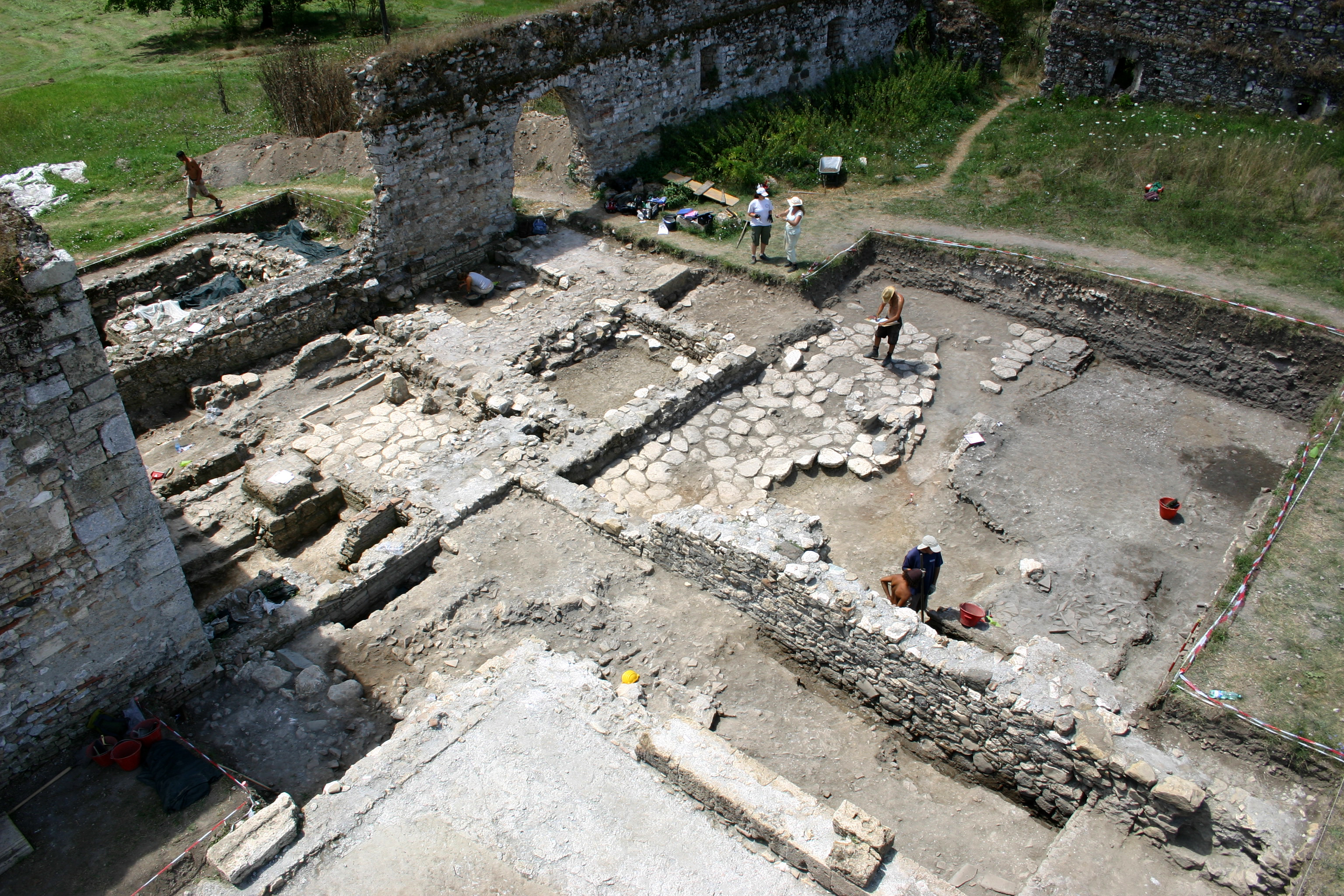
The excavation of the church of S. Pietro in Villa Magna, 2009.

Caroline Jane Goodson is an archaeologist and historian at the University of Cambridge, previously at Birkbeck College, University of London. In 2003 she won the Rome Prize for medieval studies of the American Academy in Rome. In archaeological work, Goodson is most closely associated with the Villa Magna site in Italy where she has been field director since 2006.

== Early life ==
Caroline Jane Goodson was brought up in Corpus Christi, Texas. She began her advanced education at Rhode Island School of Design from where she graduated with a Bachelor of Fine Arts degree in 1997 with a specialism in printmaking and art history. She received her master's degree from Columbia University in 1998 where she studied at the Department of Art History and Archaeology. She then studied in Italy at the Scuola Interdisciplinare di Metodologie Archeologiche of the Istituto Internazionale di Studi Liguri in Bordighera after which she returned to Columbia University from where she received her doctorate in 2004.

== Career ==
Goodson was first appointed as a teaching fellow at Columbia University on 2003/04. In 2004/05 she was a research associate at the Medieval Institute and a visiting professor at the University of Notre Dame.

From 2005 to 2018, Goodson was a lecturer at Birkbeck, University of London, first in medieval history and later in medieval archaeology and history. She is a fellow of the Royal Historical Society, the American Academy in Rome from where she received the Rome Prize in 2003, and the Società degli Archeologi Medievisti Italiani.

Goodson has worked on a number of archaeological sites, mostly in Italy, of which the most significant has been the Villa Magna site where she has been field director since 2006.

In 2007, she was awarded the Blackwells Prize for her article "Material memory: Rebuilding the basilica of S. Cecilia in Trastevere, Rome" which appeared that year in the journal Early Medieval Europe. In 2016, she was awarded a Leverhulme Trust Research Fellowship for a project, "Urban gardening in Early Medieval Italy: cultivating the city."

Goodson's research interests lie in early medieval Mediterranean society and culture, the archaeology of daily life and the material culture of the everyday, urban gardening, and the diversification of city spaces in the Middle Ages.

== Selected publications ==
=== Books ===
- Walls and memory: The Abbey of San Sebastiano at Alatri (Lazio), from late Roman monastery to Renaissance villa and beyond. Brepols, Turnhout, 2005. (Edited with Elizabeth Fentress, P. Laird and S. Leone) (Disciplina Monastica 2) ISBN 9782503515779
- Cities, texts and social networks, 400-1500: Experiences and perceptions of medieval urban space. Ashgate, Aldershot, 2010. (With Anne Elisabeth Lester and Carol Symes) ISBN 9780754667230
- The Rome of Pope Paschal I (817-824): Papal power, urban renovation, church rebuilding and relic translation. Cambridge University Press, Cambridge, 2010. (Cambridge Studies in Medieval Life and Thought 77) ISBN 978-0521768191

=== Articles and chapters ===
- "Material memory: Rebuilding the basilica of S. Cecilia in Trastevere, Rome" in Early Medieval Europe, 15.1 (2007), pp 20–52.
- "Roman archaeology in medieval Rome" in Rome: Continuing encounters between past and present, Dorigen Caldwell and Lesley Caldwell (Eds.), Ashgate, Aldershot, 2011, pp. 23–45.
- "L’eredità di una villa imperiale in epoca bizantina e medievale" in Archeologia Medievale, 29 (2012), pp. 57–86. (With E. Fentress)
