= Palazzo Gottifredo =

Coordinates: 41.7261°N 13.3437°E

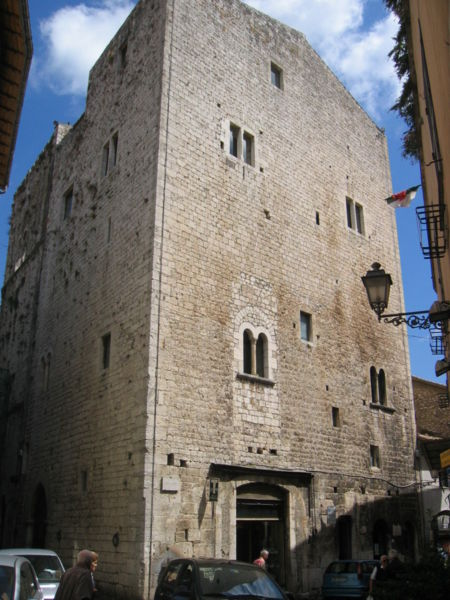
Gottifredo Palace

Palazzo Gottifredo is a large medieval house in Alatri in the Lazio Region of Italy. It lies at the confluence of the main streets of Alatri at the time of the palace's construction: the first, coming from the north city gate of San Pietro; the second, from west, arrives from the ancient Via San Francesco which passes through the gate of the same name; the third from gate St Nicholas, to the east.

Both the size of the palace and the morphology of the interior spaces suggest that Cardinal Gottifredo di Raynaldo, ordered its construction, and wanted several functions: defence, government and entertainment. Since 1932, the oldest part of the palace, which corresponds to the tower facing the intersection of the three streets— in Alatri known as the Trivio (crossroads)— has housed the City Museum.

== Design and construction of the building ==
The entire monument has a central part (slightly curved to follow the line of the street) on which lies the principal door (with a pointed arch and double moulding) and two towers, one on the crossroads and the other on the opposite side. The Palace was designed in the 13th century. Constructuction is assigned between 1229, when Gottifredo was Canon of the local Cathedral, and 1286, a year before his death, when was appointed Podesta of the town.

=== The construction ===
The first tower on the crossroads is Romanesque in style and anterior to the central part of the building. Starting from the first tower the entire palace was completed in a second phase, following the model of the medieval tower house. The house had an inner porch and was a multifunctional structure given that its surface has both small windows (for defence) and large mullioned windows (for halls and dwelling rooms). Later, during a third building phase, the multivalent function of the palace was stressed. On the ground floor there were the stables, on the first floor the home of the Cardinal and on the third floor a large Assembly Hall covered by a roof supported by three stately pointed stone arches typical of Gothic architecture.

=== From the Government of Gottifredo to the earthquake of 1349 ===
The Gottifredo Palace was the centre of local politics and was a symbol of stability. The season of its full functionality and magnificence, however, did not last long. The death of Gottifredo left a vacuum of power that was followed up in 1296 by an unbroken series of violence, looting and destruction. Half a century later, the strong earthquake caused the collapse of the central part of the palace. The pointed arches on top floor collapsed on the floors below. Later a courtyard was realized in place of the hall on top floor and two buildings were rebuilt.

=== From the age of decline of the city to eighteenth century ===
After Gottifredo the town declined. The town was subjugated to the papacy, which limited the autonomy of the city but did not guarantee its safety. The fate of the building was the same as the entire town. Probably the palace continued to be the Podestas’ residence, but it is certain that subsequent interventions (because of the other earthquakes of 1654 and 1703) were modest. It is likely that in 1700 there was the construction of a smaller palace with an autonomous structure, which used the main entrance of the Gottifredo, but remodelled the interior of the second tower and changed the floors at different heights from the original project. By doing this some of the windows on the façade of the building were also changed.

=== The recent reconstruction of the great hall and roof ===
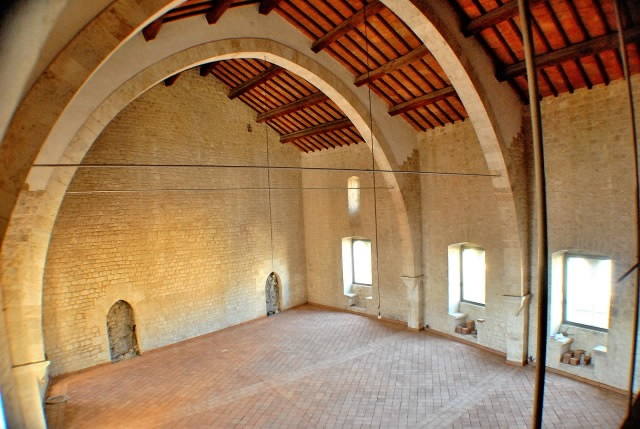
The great hall with pointed arches on the top floor of the Gottifredo Palace, restored in 2010

The 20th century was marked by some sporadic interventions, the most important of which occurred between 1920 and 1930. In 2006 a large restoration of the building began. The architects Giovanni Fontana and Alfredo Spalvieri have resumed the project of Enrico Pavone who forty years ago designed the total reconstruction of the collapsed parts. Their project keeps the palace with all the most important interventions made over the centuries but imposes the original arch structure. After more than 650 years, the last floor was entirely rebuilt, while the arches at the intermediate level have been left in order to maintain the 18th century interventions.

== The interior ==
Without considering some of the rooms on the ground floor which originally served as stables, and that now house small shops, the Gottifredo Palace is essentially divided into two parts, at present entirely separate: one is the tower-house, accessed by Corso Cavour, which is part of the municipal assets and includes the museum; the other is the remaining and larger part of the building, with the ample portal on Via Emanuele Lisi. The building is owned by various individuals and includes the inner tower, the eighteenth-century palace and the central body with the great Gothic Hall by the pointed arches.

=== The museum ===
The Museum consists of an epigraphical section and a demo-anthropological section.

=== The eighteenth-century apartments ===
They are currently under restoration. They have high chestnut panelled ceilings and eighteenth century frescoes.

== Sources ==
- Giuseppe Zander, Il palazzo del Cardinal Gottifredo ad Alatri, in “Palladio” 1952, fase 2a, pp. 109–112
- Enrico Pavone, Progetto di restauro del palazzo Gottifredo in Alatri, in “Bollettino di Storia e Arte del Lazio Meridionale”, IV, 1966
- Giovanni Fontana e Alfredo Spalvieri, "Il Palazzo Gottifredo ad Alatri. Progetto per il restauro, il miglioramento statico, la ricostruzione e la riqualificazione funzionale", in Territori. Periodico dell'Ordine degli architetti della Provincia di Frosinone, maggio-dicembre 2010, pp. 5–20
