= Le Jeu d'Adam =

12th-century liturgical drama

Le Jeu d'Adam (Latin: Ordo representacionis Adae, English: The Play of Adam) is a twelfth-century liturgical drama written in the Anglo Norman dialect of Medieval French. While choral texts and stage directions are in Latin, the spoken text of the play is in the vernacular, which makes Adam the oldest extant play written in any old French dialect. It is a dramatic representation of the temptation and fall of Adam and Eve, the story of Cain and Abel, and a series of prophets including Isaiah and Daniel. The latter part of the play is largely taken from the Latin Sermo Contra Judaeos, Paganos et Arianos, attributed to pseudo-Augustine. It is part of the medieval tradition of mystery plays, which developed from dramatic elements in the celebration of Mass, and includes choral music.

The opening statement of the piece describes part of the set:

Let paradise be constructed in a prominently high place [constituatus paradisus loco eminentori]; let curtain and silken hangings be placed around it at such a height that those persons who will be in paradise can be seen from the shoulders upwards; let sweet-smelling flowers and foliage be planted; within let there be various trees, and fruits hanging on them, so that the place may seem as delightful as possible [ut amoenissimus locus videatur].

Past scholarly consensus had held that the play was to be presented outside the church, possibly with Paradise being located at the top of the stairs to the west door, such that the church doors would stand in for the gates of Heaven. However, the positioning of the play's staging has always been a matter of scholarly controversy, and recent work by Christophe Chaguinian, drawing on the body of scholarship before him including the work of Grace Frank, has persuasively argued that the play was staged inside. Chaguinian writes that 'The stage directions do not indicate that it was played outside and this assertion, commonly expressed, seems influenced by the old theory according to which lay religious drama was the final product of the evolution of liturgical drama.' The traditional idea of the play as performed outside the church fits in with the traditional placing of Adam in the context of mystery plays, an early vernacular drama understood as a hinge-piece between dramatised liturgy and lay religious drama, such as later English Biblical play cycles. This view has been cast into doubt by the publication of MS Tours 927 and the Provenance of the Play in 2017, which necessitates a re-evaluation of prior assumptions about the play.

The author of the Adam is unknown, although we can assume from his knowledge of Latin that he was in a religious position. Chaguinian and others have recently suggested that the play might be attributed to a large secular Cathedral school, given its large cast and vernacular setting and the fact that the Beauvais Play of Daniel, which is fairly close to Adam chronologically, has been contextualized as a Cathedral school play.

The text of Adam is preserved only in a single manuscript, MS Tours 927, held in the Municipal Library of Tours, France. The MS shows evidence of having been written by a scribe from the Loire valley, including orthographic mistakes and marginal verse in Occitan, although the play itself would appear to be in the Norman dialect, conventionally assumed to be Anglo-Norman. (We might therefore assume that the play as we have received it is a copy of an older original.)

== Modern performances ==
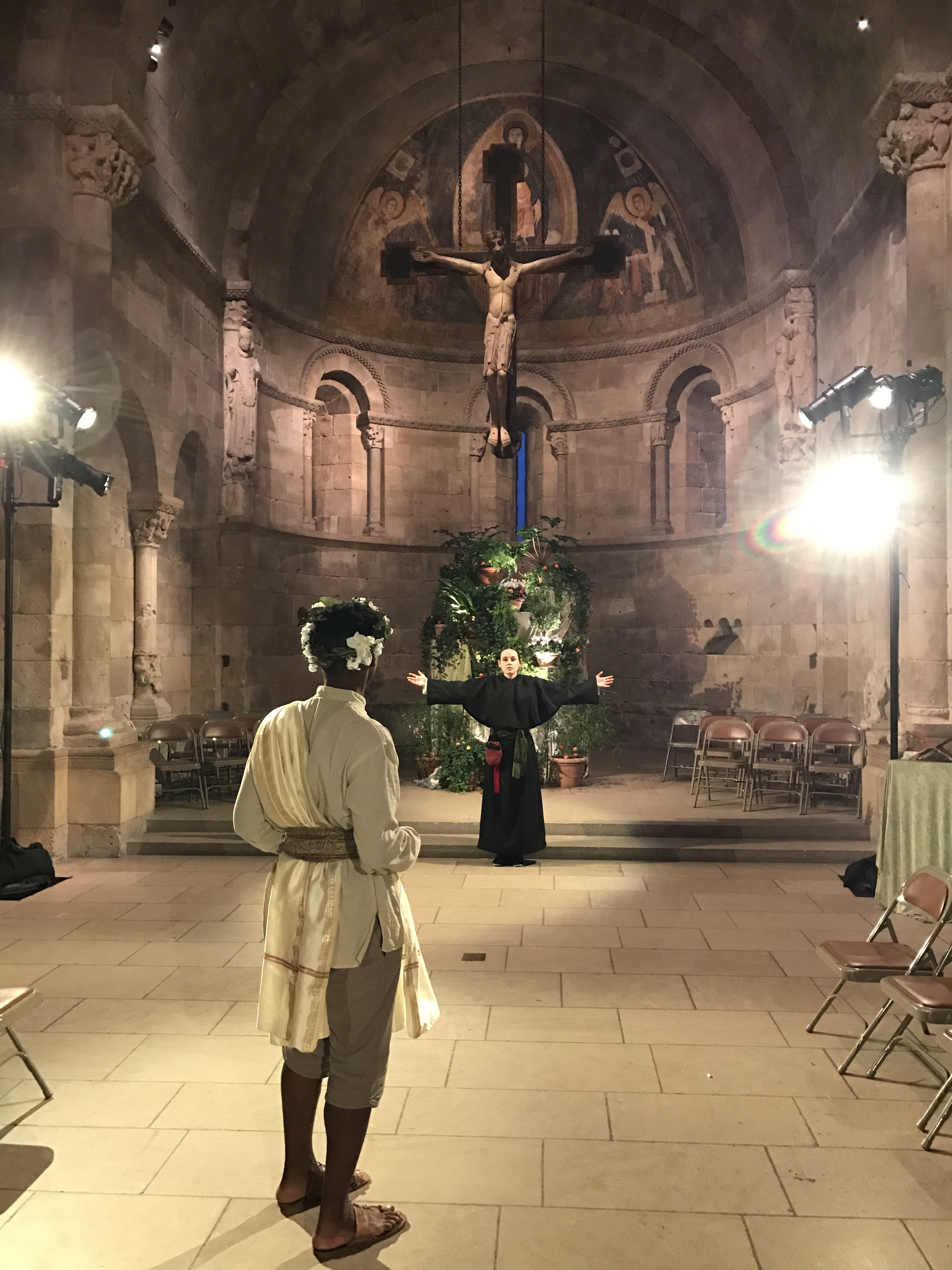
The Play of Adam at the Cloisters (2016). Christian Wilson as Adam, Allie Wessel as The Devil. Directed by Kyle A. Thomas. Translation by Carol Symes.

The 2009 English translation of the play by Carol Symes in The Broadview Anthology of British Literature was staged at the Metropolitan Museum of Art's Cloisters Museum in New York City in December 2016. That production, directed by Kyle A. Thomas, also traveled to the campus of the University of Illinois, Urbana-Champaign where it was filmed and made publicly available.
