= Maria Raffaella Cimatti =

Italian Roman Catholic nun

Blessed Maria Raffaella Cimatti HSM
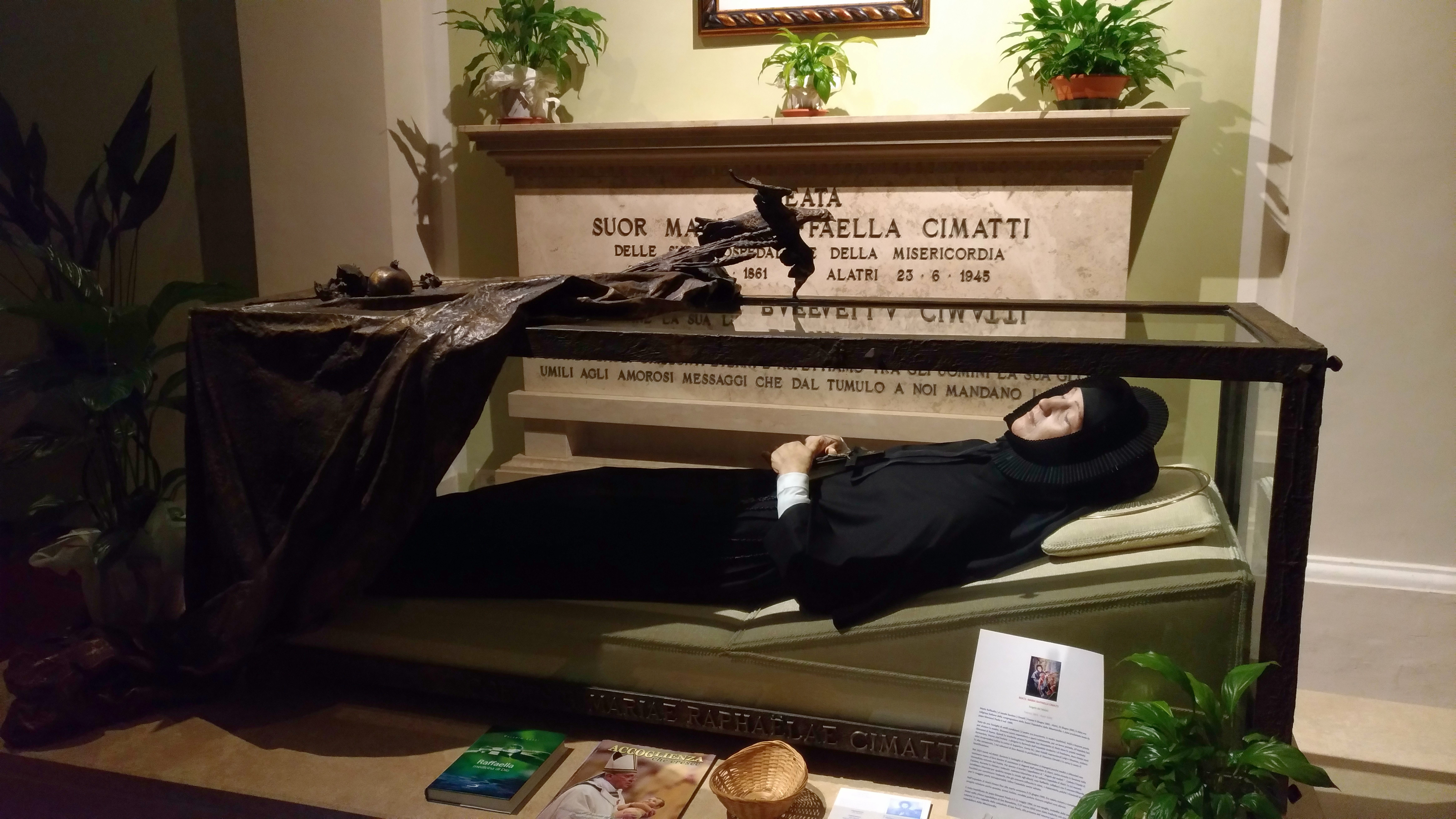

Virgin
- Born: Santina Cimatti; 7 June 1861; Celle, Faenza, Ravenna
- Died: 23 June 1945 (aged 84); Alatri, Frosinone, Kingdom of Italy
- Venerated in: Roman Catholic Church
- Beatified: 12 May 1996, Vatican City by Pope John Paul II
- Major shrine: Alatri Cathedral
- Feast: 23 June

Maria Raffaella Cimatti (7 June 1861 – 23 June 1945) was an Italian member of the Hospitaller Sisters of Mercy, a religious institute dedicated to medical care. She was beatified by the Catholic Church in 1996.

== Biography ==
She was born Santina Cimatti on 7 June 1861 in Celle, a village now a part of Faenza in the Province of Ravenna, to Giacomo Cimatti and his wife, Rosa Pasi. Her father was a farmworker and her mother a weaver. After Santina, the couple had five boys: Domenico, Paolo and Antonio, who all died in infancy, and Luigi and Vincenzo, who both later joined the Salesians of Don Bosco. Upon her father's death in 1882, Cimatti helped her mother by schooling her brothers, though from a young age she wanted to enter religious life.

After her brothers joined the Salesians and the local parish priest took her mother in, Cimatti, who was then freed of family obligations, went to Rome and joined the Hospitaler Sisters of Mercy in 1889. There she was given the religious name Maria Raffaella and dedicated her life to helping the sick the following year, taking her temporary religious vows in 1890. In 1893 she was sent to St. Benedict Hospital in Alatri, Frosinone, to study nursing and to serve as a pharmacist's assistant. She took her perpetual vows in 1905.

Later, Cimatti was sent to nurse for her first posting at the Umberto I Hospital in Frosinone, where in 1921, she was also placed in charge of the convent as prioress. Her primary duty during her career was as hospital pharmacist. In 1928 she was sent back to the convent in Alatri, where she served as prioress until 1940, when she asked to be allowed to retire from her administrative duties and to serve the Sisters, the patients, the students and the hospital staff. She was diagnosed with a fatal disease in 1943. The following year, under the German occupation of the city during World War II, she nursed the war wounded and personally interceded with the German Generalfeldmarschall Albert Kesselring at his headquarters in Alatri when rumors of bombing the city surfaced. The city was spared. She died on 23 June 1945 in Alatri, and buried in a little chapel which served the hospital.

== Veneration ==
A steady veneration of Cimatti having developed after her death, a canonization process was opened on 6 June 1962 in Alatri by Vittorio Ottaviani, the local bishop. For five years, the Ordinary Process on the Reputation of Holiness was conducted and the Rogatory Process took place in Faenza in 1967. Between 1988 and 1989 her intercession in a miraculous healing was investigated.

The cause was accepted for further investigation by the Congregation for the Causes of Saints of the Holy See, which led to a decree declaring her life to have been one of heroic virtue in 1994, making it possible for her beatification. She was beatified on 12 May 1996 by Pope John Paul II in St. Peter's Square in Vatican City, and her remains were moved from the hospital chapel to the Cathedral of St. Paul in Alatri.
