= Madonna di Loreto, Anagni =

Catholic church in Frosinone province, Italy

Coordinates: 41°44′32.6″N 13°09′28.5″E

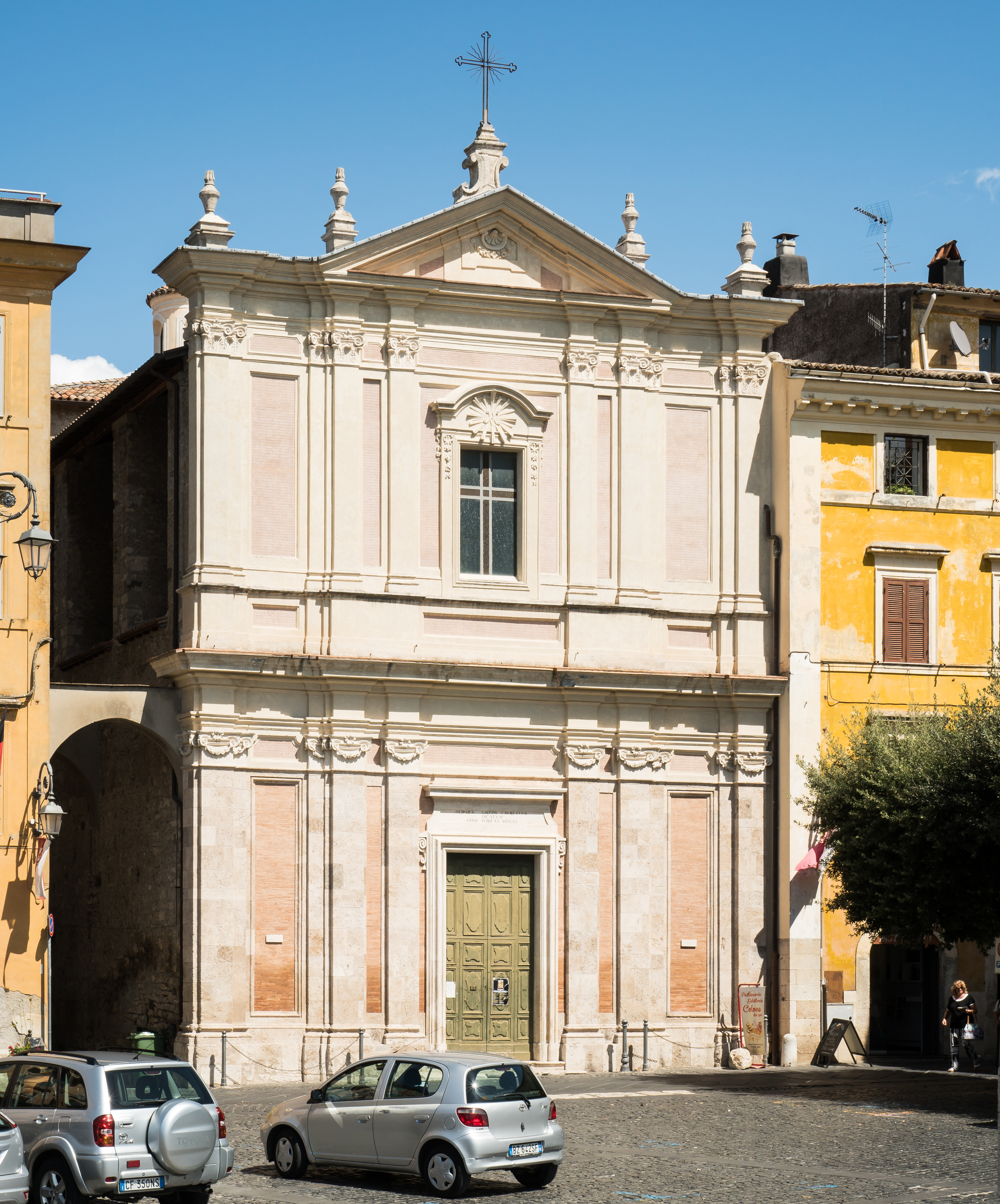
Madonna di Loreto Church

Madonna di Loreto is a Roman Catholic church located in front of the Piazza Cavour in the town of Anagni, province of Frosinone, region of Lazio, Italy.

== History ==
A church at the site was originally dedicated to Santa Balbina, however during the jubilee year of 1750 under the patronage of the bishop Bacchettoni, the present church was erected. The tall and slender two story facade abounds in pilasters, and leads to a single nave with side chapels. The presbytery has a small dome and lantern. The first altarpiece on the left has a canvas depicting St Blaise, St Lucy, and Saint Apollonia by Taddeo Zuccari. The main altarpiece, encased in a polychrome marble frame depicts the Transfiguration of the Madonna of Loreto with Holy Bishop Magno and Saint Balbina (1755) by Magno Tucciarelli.
