= Giovanni Fontana (poet) =

Giovanni Fontana (born 1946) is an Italian poet, performance artist, author and publisher.

== Career ==
Fontana was born in Frosinone, Lazio. He has been dealing for forty years with multi-code languages, intermedia techniques, sound poetry and visual poetry.

Interested in the relationship between the arts, he came to a new conception of text and theorized the concepts of "pre-textual poetry" and the "epigenetic poetry". His visual compositions present themselves as real scores, as pre-texts through which to attain a performance dimension. From the latter half of the 1960s, he has experience in theatre with the dramatic art groups. In 1968, he founded a small experimental theatre company. For the theatre he wrote texts, and he also worked as scenographer and musician. His first visual poems are dated around the years of 1966–1968 and they develop parallel to sound experimentations on magnetic tape, which later were used in theatre (1968–1972).

Fontana has published books and records. Among his works are the score-text Radio/Dramma (1977), the visual poetry works Le lamie del labirinto (1981) and L'uomo delle pulizie (1984), the collection of poetry Scritture lineari (1986), the poems La discarica fluente (1997), Frammenti d'ombre e penombre (2005), Questioni di scarti (2012), the monograph Testi e pre-testi (2010) and two novels: Tarocco Meccanico (1990) and Chorus (2000). Fontana wrote theoretical and critical essays, including "La voce in movimento" (2003), "Poesia della voce e del gesto" (2004), "Le dinamiche nomadi della performance" (2006), "L'opera plurale" (2009).

Fontana was the curator of the CD Verbivocovisual. Antologia di poesia sonora 1964–2004 for the magazine Il Verri; he founded La Taverna di Auerbach, an international magazine of intermedial poetics, and the magazine of sound poetry Momo (voci, suoni & rumori della poesia), and he is an editor of the audiomagazine Baobab. With his visual poems he took part in many exhibitions in Europe, in the Americas, in Japan and Australia, giving performances and installations in thousands of festivals for new poetry and electronic art.

=== Bibliography ===
- Radio/Dramma, Geiger, Torino, Italy, 1977;
- Le lamie del labirinto, Dismisuratesti, Frosinone, Italy, 1981;
- L'uomo delle pulizie, Dismisuratesti, Frosinone, Italy, 1984;
- Scritture lineari, Hetea, Alatri, Italy, 1986;
- Tarocco Meccanico, Altri Termini, Napoli, Italy, 1990;
- Homaly Altrove, Pensionante de' Saraceni, Caprarica di Lecce, Italy, 1990;
- Chorus. Romanzo per voci a battuta libera, Piero Manni Editore, Lecce, Italy, 2000 [ISBN 88-8176-171-8; 9788881761715];
- Paysages, ovvero La favola breve dei sensi confusi, Archivio Poiesis, Alatri, Italy, 2000;
- "Art Action in Italy", in Art Action, 1958-1998, Inter/éditeur, Québec, Québec, 2001[ISBN 292050019-8; 9782920500198];
- La voce in movimento. Vocalità, scritture e strutture intermediali nella sperimentazione poetico-sonora, Ed. Harta Performing & Momo, Monza, Italy, 2003 [ISBN 88-88421-01-7; 9788888421018];
- Poesia della voce e del gesto, Editoriale Sometti, Mantova, Italy, 2004 ISBN 978-88-7495-023-2;
- "Arte Acción en Italia", in Arte Acción, IVAM, Institut Valencà d'Art Modern, Valencia, Spain, 2004 [ISBN 84-482-3714-5; 9788448237141];
- Frammenti d'ombre e penombre, Fermenti, Roma, Italy, 2005 ISBN 88-87959-88-9;
- Le dinamiche nomadi della performance, Edizioni Harta Performing, Monza, Italy, 2006;
- L'opera plurale: intermedialità, drammaturgia delle arti, poesia d'azione, Edizioni Harta Performing, Monza, Italy, 2009;
- Testi e pre-testi, Fondazione Berardelli, Brescia, Italy, 2009;
- Wasted time, Redfoxpress, Achill Island, Ireland, 2011;
- Giovanni Fontana digerisce l'anima, Marcantoni Arte Contemporanea, Pedaso, Italy, 2012;
- Le arti del suono - Poetiche fonetiche ed altre, Aracne Editrice S.r.l., Roma, Italy, 2012, ISBN 978-88548-5694-3;
- Questioni di scarti, Edizioni Polìmata, Roma, Italy, 2012, ISBN 978-88-96760-25-3;
- Déchets, Dernier Télégramme, Limoges, France, 2014, ISBN 978-2-917136-70-6;
- Italian Performance Art (with Nicola Frangione and Roberto Rossini), Sagep Editori, Genova, Italy, 2015, ISBN 978-88-6373-337-2;
- Penultime battute, Eureka Edizioni, Corato (Bari), Italy, 2017;
- Fonemi (Memorie d'Artista, Artist book n. 43), Ed. Galleria Peccolo, Livorno, Italy, 2017;
- In fluenti traslati. L'opera poetica di Arrigo Lora Totino, Fondazione Berardelli, Brescia, Italy, 2018;
- Discrasie - Sessioni metacritiche, Collana Entroterra, Edizioni Novecento Libri, Roma, Italy, 2018, ISBN 978-88-94340-63-1;
- La voix et l'absence, Dernier Télégramme, Limoges, France, 2019, ISBN 979-10-97146-24-5;
- No A <–> No Z, with Klaus Peter Dencker, Achill Island, Ireland, 2019;
- Epigenetic Poetry (edited by Patrizio Peterlini), Danilo Montanari Editore, Ravenna, Italy, 2020, ISBN 978-88-85449-59-6;
- Il corpo denso, preface by Barbara Meazzi, Campanotto Editore, Pasian di Prato (Udine), Italy, 2021, ISBN 978-88-456-1741-6;
- Paysages, ovvero La favola breve dei sensi confusi, preface by Eugenio Miccini, new edition, Fondazione Bonotto, Colceresa (Vicenza), Italy, 2021.
- HIC, edited by Giorgio Moio, Città di Castello (PG), Bertoni Editore, 2021, ISBN 9788855354141.
- Je sens [donc je son, preface by Barbara Meazzi, Marseille - Limoges, Cipm & Dernier Télégramme, 2021, ISBN 979-10-97146-41-2.
- Inventario, preface by Salvatore Luperto, Edizioni Milella, Lecce, 2022, ISBN 978-88-3329-013-3.
- The Poetic Machine, Redfoxpress, Achill Island, Ireland, 2022.
- La discarica fluente, preface by Giorgio Patrizi, Diaforia and dreamBOOK edizioni, Viareggio, 2023, ISBN 9788899830762.
- Controcanti – Testi per musica, preface by Barbara Meazzi, Molesini Editore, Venezia, 2024, ISBN 9791281270060.
- Solo flight, Achill Island, Ireland, Redfoxpress, 2026.
- Le scritture di Bérénice – Dinamiche della voce e maschere sonore, preface by Gabriella Giansante, Quaderni di Bérénice n. 18, Valencia (Spain), El Doctor Sax, 2026, ISBN 9798254817000.

=== Discography ===
- Oggi Poesia Domani, audio tape "Baobab" 3, Reggio Emilia, Italy, 1979;
- Il Dolce Stil Suono, audio tape "Baobab" 4, Reggio Emilia, Italy, 1980);
- Sep-tic, audio tape "Vec" 7, Maastricht, Holland, 1980;
- Ulise's Dog, audio tape "Vec" 9, Maastricht, Holland, 1981;
- Hark, audio tape "Vec" 14, Maastricht, Holland, 1982;
- Voooxing Poooêtre, vinyl record LP 33 rpm, Comune di Bondeno, Bondeno, Italy, 1982;
- The Voice, audio tape "Area Condizionata" 2, Forte dei Marmi, Italy, 1983;
- Mail Music, vinyl record LP 33 rpm, Ed. Armadio Officina, Monza, Italy, 1983;
- Nuovi Segnali, audio tape, Ed. Maggioli, Rimini, Italy, 1983;
- Poema Larsen, vinyl record 45 rpm, Ed. 3Vi Tre, Cento, Italy, 1983;
- Audio Child, audio tape, Ed. Gajewski, Amsterdam, Holland, 1984;
- Tracksound, audio tape, Ed. Tracce, Pescara, Italy, 1984;
- To post a tape, audio tape, Ed. Minimart, Cesson, France, 1984;
- Italics Environments, vinyl record LP 33 rpm, Ed. Armadio Officina, Monza, Italy, 1985;
- Polipoesia, vinyl record 45 rpm, Ed. 3Vi Tre, Cento, Italy, 1985;
- Antologia Polipoetica, audio tape, STI Ed., Zaragoza, Spain, 1986;
- Inter K-7 '87, audio tape, Ed. Le Lieu, Québec, Canada, 1987;
- Spagna-Messico-Italia, vinyl record LP 33 rpm, Ed. 3Vi Tre Pair, Cento, Italy, 1988;
- Past & Modern Sound Poetry in Italy, audio tape, "Slowscan" 8, Hertogenbosch, Netherlands, 1988;
- FIRA 89, audio tape edited by José Iges, RNE, Madrid, Spain, 1989;
- Storia della Poesia Sonora, audio tape "Baobab" 18, Reggio Emilia, Italy, 1989;
- Baobab Festival, audio tape "Baobab" 19, Reggio Emilia, Italy, 1990;
- FIRA 90, audio tape edited by José Iges, RNE, Madrid, Spain, 1990;
- Baobab Italia 1990/91, audio tape "Baobab" 21, Reggio Emilia, Italy, 1992;
- Building Plans & Schemes - Radio Art & Telephone Networking, audio tape, Radio Omroep, Limburg, Holland, 1993;
- L'in-canto del verso, 4 audio tapes edited by Giovanni Fontana and Luca Salvadori, "Baobab" 23, Reggio Emilia, Italy, 1994;
- Italia 1995, 4 audio tapes, "Baobab" 27, Reggio Emilia, Italy, 1995;
- Momo 1, audio tape Momo, Ed. Rouge et Noir, Frosinone, Italy, 1996;
- "Prospettiva 4", in Wirrwarr by Umberto Petrin, CD, Splasc(h) Records, Varese, Italy, 1996;
- Radio Art, CD, Ed. Harta Performing, Monza, Italy, 1997;
- Opérette d'artistes, CD, Fractal Music, Production Station Mir, Hérouville St. Claire, France, 1998;
- Elettrocabaret - Riletture futuriste di Giovanni Fontana, CD + artist booklet, Edizioni Farsettiarte, Prato, Italy, 1999;
- Il gioco delle voci, CD enclosed to the book Chorus, Ed. Piero Manni, Lecce, Italy, 2000;
- Homo Sonorus, An international anthology of sound poetry, 4 CD + book, The National Center of Contemporary Art, Kaliningrad Branch, Russia, 2001;
- La voce in movimento, "Momo" 2, CD + book edited by Giovanni Fontana, Ed. Rouge et Noir, Frosinone, Italy, 2003;
- Verbivocovisual – Antologia di poesia sonora 1964-2004, edited by Giovanni Fontana, CD enclosed to the magazine Il Verri, n° 25, Ed. Monogramma, Milano, Italy, 2004;
- Erratum #4. Sound review. Noise + Art + Poetry, 3 CD, Edited by Erratum Musical, Besançon, France, 2004;
- Krikri 2006, CD, Ed. Krikri, Gand, Belgium, 2006;
- Il mondo è stato riconsiderato. Poesie italiane del secondo Novecento, CD edited by Endre Szhàrosi, Bölcsész Konzorcium HEFOP Iroda, Budapest, Hungary, 2006;
- Per le segrete stanze, CD enclosed to the catalogue "Wunderkammern", Ed. Artpages, Isernia-Napoli, Italy, 2007;
- Stanza segreta, CDrom, "Le son d'amour – Leçon d'amour", Doc(k)s 5/8, Akenaton production, Ajaccio, France, 2008;
- Ex macchina ricordi, CD edited by Pierre-André Arcand, Avatar – Ohm, Québec, Canada, 2008;
- Piedigrottesco 2009, "Futurismo – 100 anni", Stagione dei concerti del Conservatorio di Frosinone, Ed. speciale del Conservatorio, Frosinone, Italy, 2009 [Giovanni Fontana, voice; Luca Salvadori, prepared piano];
- Sento [dunque suono, DVD enclosed to the magazine "In pensiero", n° 02, gennaio/giugno, 2009, Ed. Michelangelo libri, Roma, Italy, 2009;
- Hypervox, antologia sonora 1968-2009, personal anthology, CD enclosed to the book Testi e pre-testi, Ed. Fondazione Berardelli, Brescia, Italy, 2009;
- Épidémie, DVD enclosed to the magazine Doc(k)s, 4ème Série, n° 13/14/15/16, Edition Akenaton, Ajaccio, France, 2011;
- Corpo a corpo, personal anthology, CD enclosed to the magazine The New Lotta Poetica, n° 1/2012, Fondazione Sarenco e Parise Editore, Cunettone ai Colli, Italy, 2012;
- Di bocca in bocca, DVD enclosed to the magazine Doc(k)s, 4ème série, n° 17/18/19/20, Edition Akenaton, Ajaccio, France, 2013;
- Huellkurven 2, online sound poetry magazine, Wien 2014;
- Epigenetic Poetry, LP 33 rpm, Ed. Recital, Los Angeles, U.S. 2016;
- Cellar Vol. 2, CD, produced by Sean McCann, Ed. Recital, Los Angeles, U.S., 2017.

=== Videography ===
- Conoscenza sottile/sottile inganno 1, by Giovanni Fontana, Video 2000, prod. Poiesis, Alatri, Italy, 1984;
- Conoscenza sottile/sottile inganno 2, by Giovanni Fontana, Video 2000, prod. Poiesis, Alatri, Italy, 1985;
- Improvvisa improvvisazione, by Giovanni Fontana, Video 2000, prod. Poiesis, Alatri, Italy, 1985;
- Conoscenza sottile/sottile inganno 3, by Giovanni Fontana, Video 2000, prod. Poiesis, Alatri, Italy, 1987;
- Espèces Nomades, edited by Françoise Dugré and Richard Martel, Prod. Le Lieu, Québec, Canada, 1987;
- Le Voci della Scrittura, by Antonello Capurso and Giorgio Weiss, Prod. RAI, Dipartimento Scuola Educazione, Roma, Italy,1988;
- Videor 1, by Orazio Converso, Prod. La Camera Blue, Roma, Italy, 1988;
- Videor 2, by Orazio Converso, Prod. La Camera Blue, Roma, Italy, 1989;
- Videor 3, by Orazio Converso, Prod. La Camera Blue, Roma, Italy, 1989;
- Interzone, by Richard Martel and Nathalie Perrault, Prod. Les Editions Intervention, Québec, Canada, 1992;
- Artist report, by Seiji Shimoda, Prod. Shimoda, Nagano, Japan, 1994;
- Perforium, by Gyorgy Galantai, Prod. Artpool, Budapest, Hungary, 1995;
- NIPAF 95, by Seiji Shimoda, Prod. Nipaf E.C., Nagano, Japan, 1995;
- Tot Brossa, by Sarenco, Archivio del cinema e del video d'artista, Verona, Italia, 1997/98;
- Harta performing 4-30 / 1-98, Commonpress of Italian Performing Arts, edited by Nicola Frangione, Ed. Harta Performing, Monza, Italy, 1998;
- Poesia Totale, an exhibition curated by Enrico Mascelloni and Sarenco, videocatalogue by Piero Matarrese and Pierpaolo Murru, Digital Videoart Verona, Verona, Italy, 1998;
- Apple Poem, by Giovanni Fontana, prod. Poiesis, VHS, Alatri, Italy, 1998;
- Parole in libertà continuing, Paula Claire presenting work by Gino Severini, Carlo Belloli, Giovanni Fontana, Mirella Bentivoglio, Alberto Faietti, Paula Claire at the Estorick Collection of Italian Art, London, Ed. Int. Sound & Visual Poetry Archive, Oxford, 1999;
- Viatge a la Polinèsia, "Volume XXIV: Poesia a la vista: videopoesia", videoperformance, Propost, Centre de Cultura Contemporània de Barcelona, Barcelona, Spain, 1999;
- Poésie en action, DVD-Rom, edited by Philippe Castellin and Jean Torregrosa, Doc(k)s, n° 29/33 (CD enclosed), Ed. Akenaton, Ajaccio, France, 2003;
- Varianti. Suono, parola, immagine, DVD by Leonardo Vecchi, editing Rodolfo Canaletti, Teatro San Matteo, Piacenza, Italy, 2004;
- Chorus, by N. Ricciardulli and G. Kristensen, Itinerari Armonici / Angelus Novus, L'Aquila, Italy, 2004;
- John Giorno. Voices in your head, by Antonio Poce, DVD, Centro Hermes, Ferentino, Italy, 2004;
- Nuvolari, text and voice by Giovanni Fontana, music by Valerio Murat, video by Antonio Poce, DVD, prod. "Hermes Intermedia", Ferentino, Italy, 2005;
- Coppi, voice by Giovanni Fontana and others, music by Valerio Murat, video and text by Antonio Poce, DVD, prod. "Hermes Intermedia", Ferentino, Italy, 2006;
- 5th International Krikri Festival of Polypoetry, DVD 4/5, TVF, ArtvideoTV, Gent, Belgium, 2006;
- Visez au coeur, voice by Giovanni Fontana and others, music by Valerio Murat, video by Antonio Poce, DVD, prod. "Hermes Intermedia", Ferentino, Italy, 2006;
- Sirene e incanti, text and voice by Giovanni Fontana, music and video by Antonio Poce, DVD, prod. "Hermes Intermedia", Ferentino, Italy, 2006;
- Fluxus & Happening Friends, camera by Jean-François Boudreault, Georges Sheedy, Odile Tremblay; editing Paul Brunet; DVD PAL, prod. Le Lieu, Centre en Art Actuel, Québec, Canada, 2007;
- Diavolo/Figura, voice by Giovanni Fontana, text by Elmerindo Fiore, music by Giampiero Gemini, video Antonio Poce, DVD, prod. "Hermes Intermedia", Ferentino, Italy, 2008;
- Venti e zero cinque, DVD, text and voice by Giovanni Fontana; music and video Antonio Poce; sound editing Valerio Murat; prod. "Hermes Intermedia", Ferentino, Italy, 2009;
- iCaroballa, DVD, text by Nanni Balestrini; voices Nanni Balestrini and Giovanni Fontana; music Luca Salvadori; directed by Giovanni Fontana; prod. "Hermes Intermedia", Ferentino, Italy, 2009;
- Pneumastolfo, DVD, text and voice by Giovanni Fontana; music and video Antonio Poce; sound editing Valerio Murat; prod. "Hermes Intermedia", Ferentino, Italy, 2009;
- Trentunesimo sparo, DVD, testo poetico e voce di Giovanni Fontana, musica di Alessandro Cipriani, video di Giulio Latini, 2009;
- I prati del paradiso, poems by Aldo Palazzeschi, music by Giancarlo Cardini; voice by Giovanni Fontana, DVD, Studio audio-digitale Daniele Palermini, Frosinone, Italy, 2009;
- Creazione Improvvisa, DVD edited by Dipartimento di Musica Jazz del Conservatorio di Frosinone, Frosinone 2009;
- La caravane de la parole, by Jean-François Dugas, DVD NTSC, Prod. Le Lieu, Centre en art actuel, Québec, Canada, 2009 [2 DVD];
- Fotodina(ni)mismo, DVD prod. "Hermes Intermedia" [text and voice by Giovanni Fontana; music by Ennio Morricone; video Antonio Poce; sound editing Valerio Murat], 2009;
- Poema Bonotto, video poem by Giovanni Fontana, box with USB and printed sheets, critical text by Marco Maria Gazzano, edited by Patrizio Peterlini, Fondazione Bonotto, Molvena, Italy, 2017.
