= San Giacomo, Anagni =

Church in Italy

Coordinates: 41°44′49″N 13°09′00″E

San Giacomo is a Roman Catholic church located on Via Regina Margherita in the town of Anagni, province of Frosinone, region of Lazio, Italy.

== History ==
A monastery in the town was putatively founded by St Dominic himself, this church was built alongside the monastery under the papacy of Pope Innocent IV, and dedicated to St James and St Lucy. Saint Thomas Aquinas was said to have resided in the monastery. In 1770, the church was refurbished in a late Baroque style by the Cardinal Juan Tomás de Boxadors, who was ordained in the Dominican order. In 1873, the monastery was suppressed and converted first into a hospital, and later a boarding school Regina Margherita.

The church has a cosmatesque mosaic floor. The main altar tabernacle has been attributed to Vassaletto. The main altar has an early medieval painted crucifix.
