= Sant'Andrea, Anagni =

Building in Anagni, Italy

Coordinates: 41°44′37″N 13°09′16″E

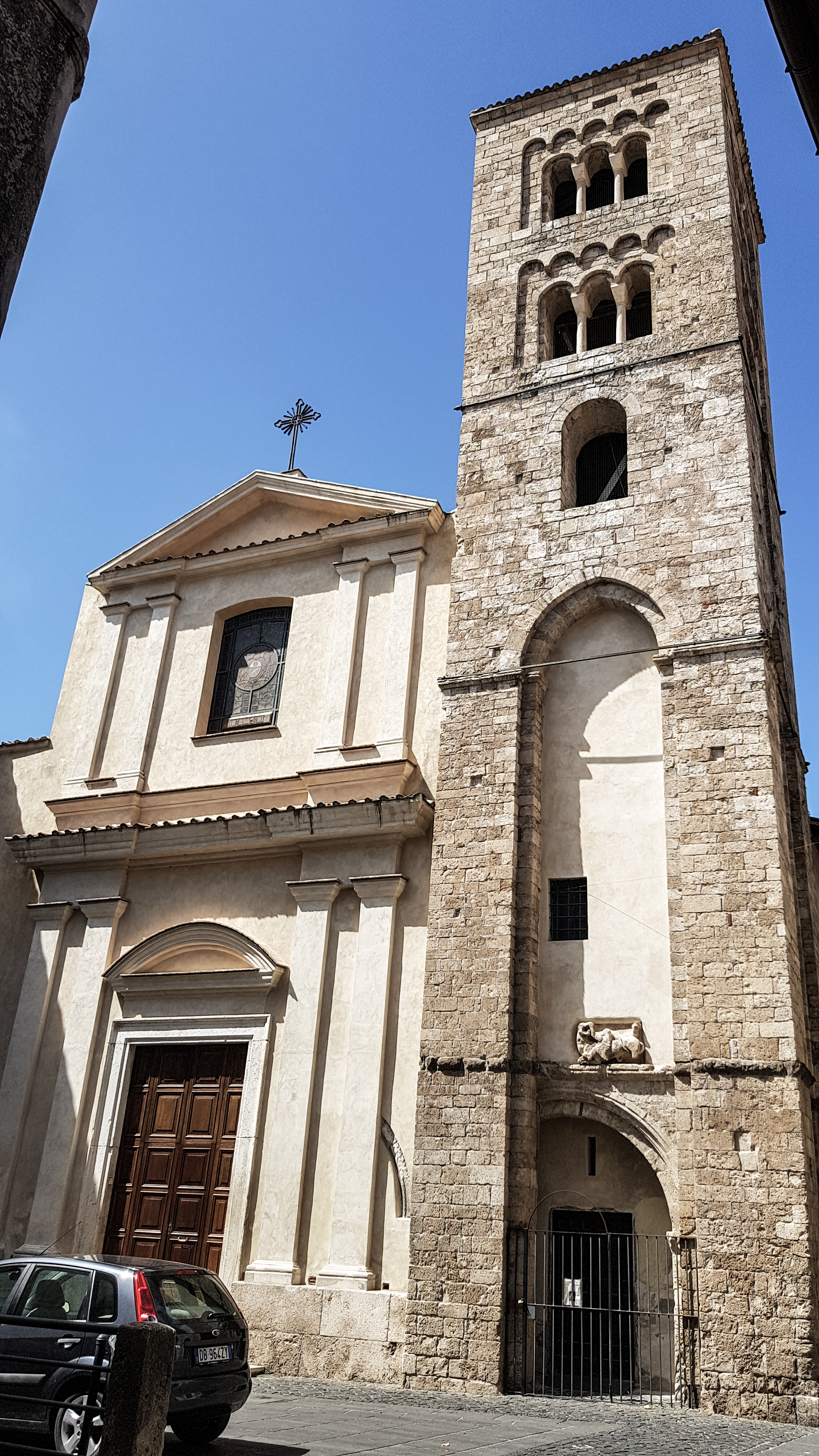

Sant'Andrea is a Roman Catholic church located on Via Vittorio Emanuele in the town of Anagni, province of Frosinone, region of Lazio, Italy.

== History ==
A church at the site is documented by 1003. Between 1263 and 1276, the church was rebuilt under Bishop Landone Conti in a Gothic style. Of the Romanesque structure, a few structures remain, among them the crypt, which was once part of the Church of San Vito. In the 16th century, Cardinal Benedetto Lomellino refurbished the church; with another restructuring between 1748 and 1751. The present facade was added in 1761. The interior has a single nave. The main altarpieces depict St Andrew:

- Virgin Mary with Saint Andrew and others by Giorgini
- Calling of St Andrew and Martyrdom of St Andrew (1894) by Gagliardi.
- A Triptych of the Savior, with Mary, Andrew and the donor Gregorius Francisci in central panel, and San Magno and Santa Secondina on the lateral panels, attributed to the school of Cavallini and Torriti.
