= Santa Maria Maggiore, Alatri =

Church building in Alatri, Italy

Coordinates: 41.7262°N 13.3422°E

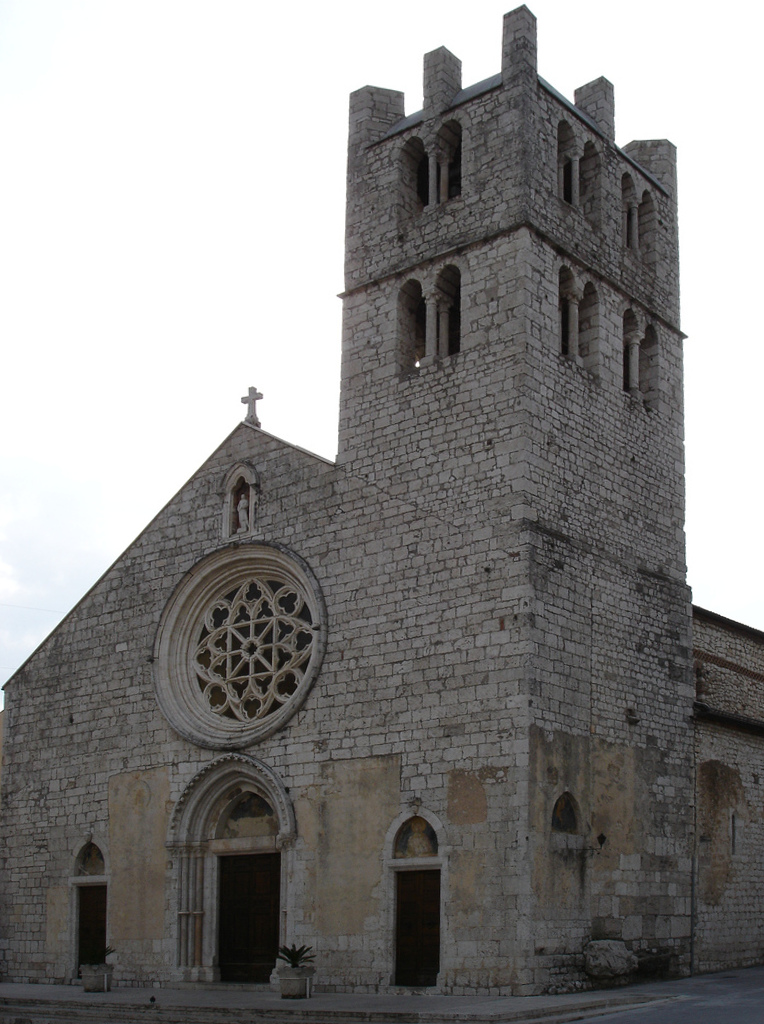
Façade of Santa Maria Maggiore.

Santa Maria Maggiore is a church in Alatri, Latium, central Italy. It was founded in the 5th century, over the ruins of an ancient temple dedicated to Venus, although it was mentioned for the first time in 1137. It was later renovated in Romanesque style and received further Gothic additions during the 13th century.

The church has a pointed façade with a central rose window from the early 14th century, whose pattern is reproduced at the center of the rose window of the nearby church of San Francesco. There are three portals, decorated with frescoed lunettes (a Madonna with Child is still visible in the central one) which were once protected by a portico, demolished in the 19th century.

The bell tower was added in 1394, as testified by an inscription of Pope Boniface IX. It had a cusp-like top, which crumbled down during an earthquake in 1654, together with a statue of St John the Baptist which was in a niche above the rose window. The sober interior has a nave and two aisles divided by pillars. Artworks housed in the church include the so-called "Madonna of Constantinople", a polychrome wooden sculpture completed by a polyptych (13th century), the late-Gothic Triptych of the Redeemer by Antonio di Alatri, an early 15th-century Virgin with Child and St. Salvatore and the 13th-century baptismal font. The marble tabernacle dates from the 15th century.

== See also ==
- Santa Maria Maggiore - Basilica in Rome and burial place of Pope Francis
