= Education Justice Project =

The Education Justice Project is a project of the University of Illinois at Urbana–Champaign to "build a model college-in-prison program that demonstrates the positive impacts of higher education upon incarcerated people, their families, the communities from which they come, the host institution, and society as a whole." It was founded in 2006 by Education professor Rebecca Ginsburg. Since 2009, the program has provided classes to more than 220 incarcerated people, primarily at Danville Correctional Center.

== Funding ==
The three sources of funds for the project are the University of Illinois, grants, and private donations. Approximately 25% of the donations they receive are from private donations. The estimated value of donated time on the part of faculty, graduate students, staff, and community members amounted to more than $200,000. Professors and grad students are not paid for teaching in the program - the program is volunteer-based.

In 2017, the project received a $1 million grant from the Andrew W. Mellon Foundation. The funding will go toward developing a men's college-in-prison program at Danville Correctional Facility, along with further course offerings at a nearby women's prison, a new speaker's series, and an effort to improve the evaluation process of the program.

== Impact ==
As of 2019, more than 220 people have taken classes through the program, including an estimated 5 students now in grad school.

=== Criticisms ===
One of the main criticisms of the program is that although students can earn credits, that are transferable to a full degree program at a college or university, the program does not directly enable participants to earn a bachelor's degree. Additionally, Ginsburg acknowledges that the program needs "a better way to measure [its] success."

== See also ==
- Carol Symes
