= Carol Symes =

American historian

Carol Symes (born 1966) is an American medieval historian at the University of Illinois at Urbana-Champaign. Symes founded the Education Justice Project's Theatre Initiative and directed a full-length production of William Shakespeare's The Tempest at Danville Correctional Center in 2013. She is also the executive editor of the academic journal The Medieval Globe."

== Early life ==
Carol Symes received her advanced education at Yale University from where she received her BA. She earned her M.Litt from the University of Oxford and her Ph.D from Harvard University. She has a Certificate in Stage Combat from the Society of British Fight Directors, which she earned while training at the Bristol Old Vic Theatre School. She is a member of Actors Equity.

== Career ==
Symes is a professor at the University of Illinois at Urbana-Champaign.

Symes founded the Education Justice Project's Theatre Initiative and has appeared in Our Play, a medley of scenes by William Shakespeare performed at the Danville Correctional Center in 2012 and in Shakespeare's The Tempest at Danville in 2013 which she also directed.

== Selected publications ==
- History in deed: Medieval society and the law in England, 1100-1600. Harvard Law Library, Cambridge, Mass., 1993.
- A common stage: Theater and public life in medieval Arras. Cornell University Press, Ithaca, 2007.
- Western civilizations. 17th edition. W.W. Norton & Co., New York, 2011. (And multiple later editions)
- Cities, texts and social networks, 400-1500: Experiences and perceptions of medieval urban space. Ashgate, Aldershot, 2010. (With Anne Elisabeth Lester and Caroline Goodson) ISBN 9780754667230
