= Sant'Agostino, Anagni =

Coordinates: 41°44′33″N 13°09′24″E

Sant'Agostino is a Roman Catholic church located in the town of Anagni, province of Frosinone, region of Lazio, Italy.

== History ==
While an older church was likely attached to an Augustinian convent, a new church was under construction in 1556, when the town was sacked by the Imperial troops under the Duke of Alba. Reconstruction proceeded until 1575, likely under the guidance and designs of Giovanni Antonio Dosio, who worked under Torquato Conti to rebuild the walls of Anagni. A subsequent reconstruction took place in the 18th century. With the suppression of the monastic order in 1873, the church became a barrack for the Carabinieri. Presently, due to structural instability, the church is closed.

The main altarpiece was a Madonna and Child with St Augustine attributed to the school of Carlo Maratta. On the side altars were canvases from the 19th century. A chapel dedicated to those fallen in the first world war was covered with photos of the soldiers.
