= Scolopi, Alatri =

Church in Frosinone province, Italy

Coordinates: 41°43′35.4″N 13°20′34.2″E

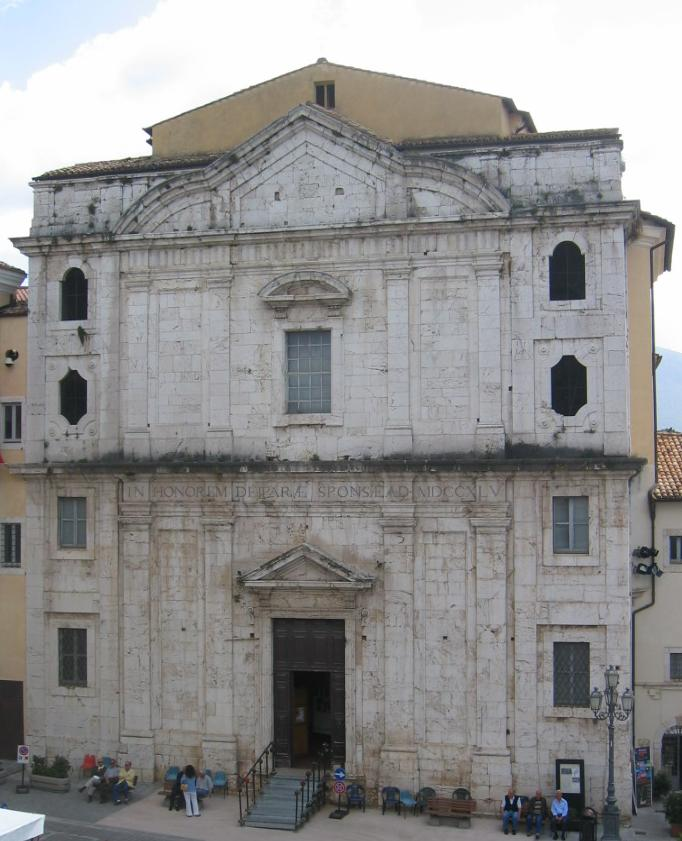

The Church of the Scolopi or Chiesa degli Scolopi is a late-Baroque style, Roman Catholic but now deconsecrated church in Alatri, province of Frosinone, in the region of Lazio, Italy. The term Scolopi is derived from the last two words of the formal name of the Piarist order: chierici regolari poveri della Madre di Dio delle scuole pie (in Latin Ordo Clericorum Regularium Pauperum Matris Dei Scholarum Piarum).

== History and description ==
The church was designed by the priest of the Piarist Order, Benedetto Margariti da Manduria, and built between 1734 and 1745. It was dedicated to the Marriage of the Virgin. The travertine marble facade has a central wing with two orders of Tuscan pilasters. The tympanum is a triangle with undulating superior sides. Initially, this was meant to be flanked by two bell-towers, but these were never built. The interior layout is that of a Greek-cross with a central dome. The interiors are decorated with monochrome painted stucco. The altarpieces include a Marriage of the Virgin (1731, main altar) painted by Carmine Spinetti, while the canvases on the lateral altars depict a Crucifixion by Benedetto Mora and a San Giuseppe Calasanzio, founder of the order of the Piarists. The church is used for exhibitions.
