= San Silvestro, Alatri =

Church in Alatri, Italy

San Silvestro is a Romanesque style, Roman Catholic church in Alatri, province of Frosinone, in the region of Lazio, Italy. The church was dedicated to the Saint and Pope Sylvester I.

== History and description ==
The 10-11th century church is built with stone with a single nave, to which a left nave and sacristy were added in 1331. The exterior has few windows, the apse retains fragments of a 12th-century fresco depicting St Sylvester and the Dragon. Other 13th and 14th century frescoes depict scenes from the gospels and saints. The 9th century crypt has ribbed ceilings and Byzantine-style frescoes.
