= Villa Magna =

Building in Anagni, Italy

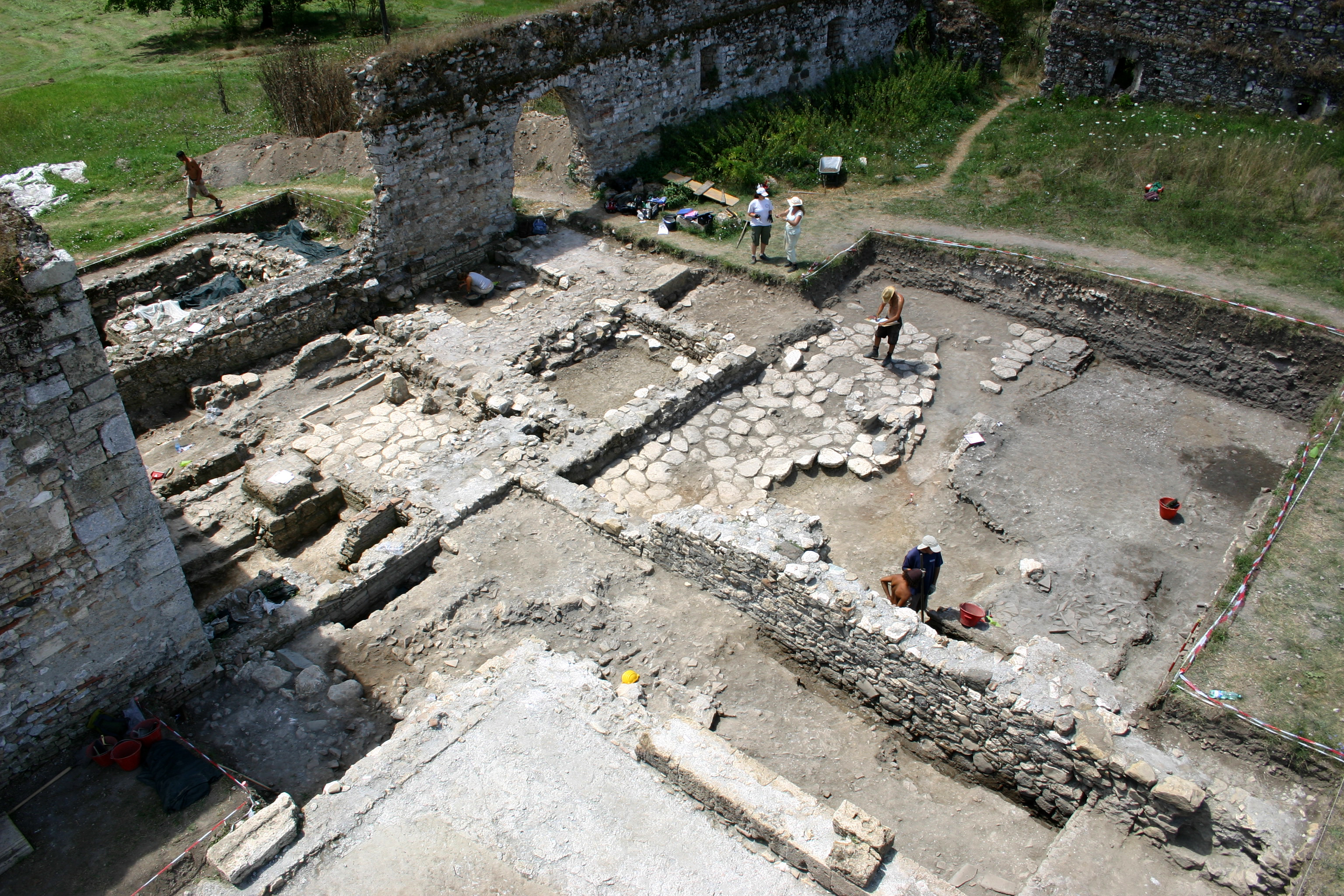
- The excavation of the church of S. Pietro in Villamagna underway, 2009.

- Location within Italy
- 41°40′57.47″N 13°6′41.91″E
- Type: villa
- Periods: Roman Imperial
- Cultures: Roman
- Location: Anagni
- Region: Lazio

Site notes
- Public access: Yes

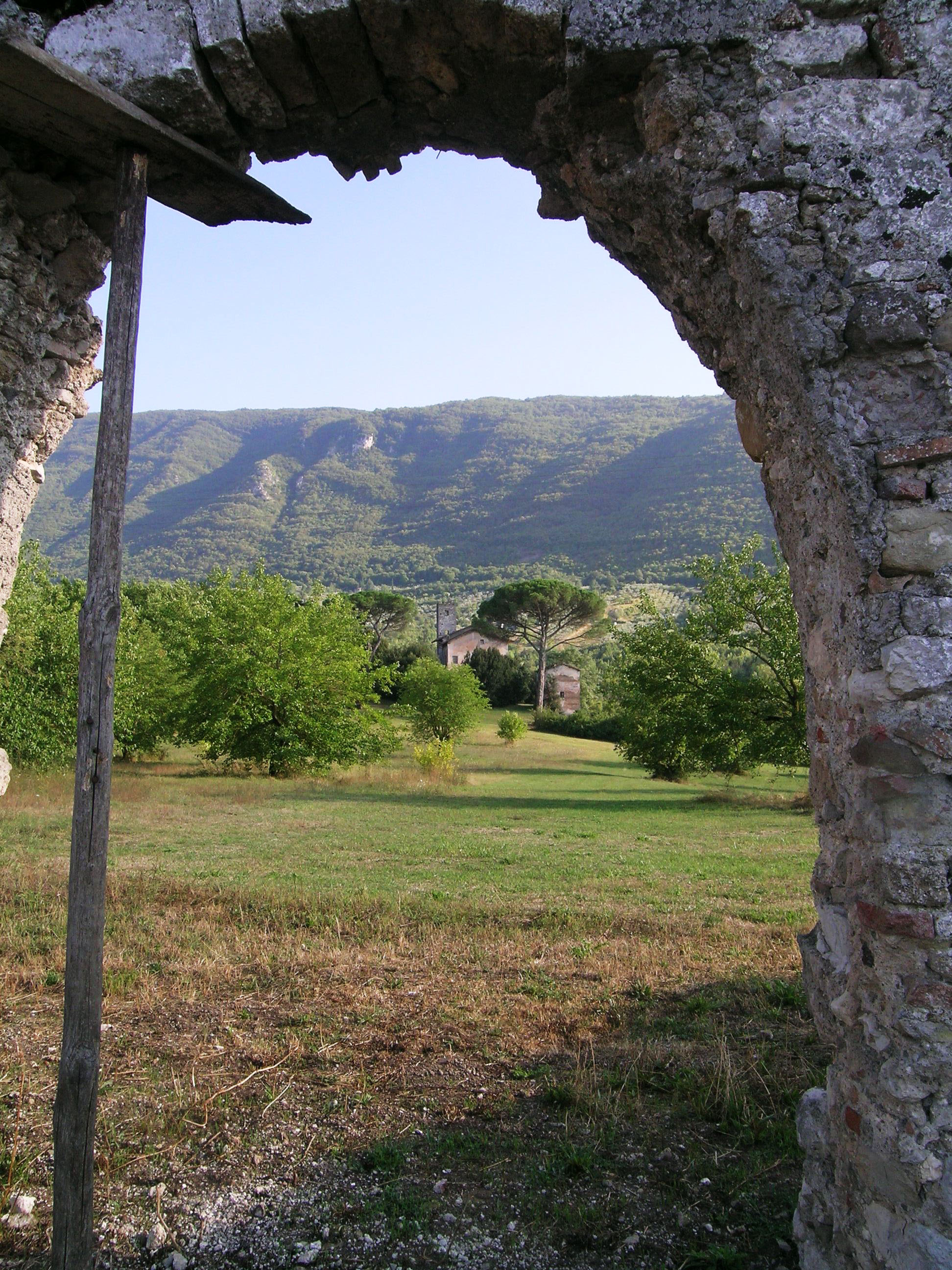
A view of the 19th-century casale built on top of the Roman villa.

Villa Magna is a large imperial ancient Roman villa near the modern town of Anagni, in Lazio, central Italy. The site lies in the Valle del Sacco some 65 km south of Rome, at the foot of the Monti Lepini, directly under the peak known as Monte Giuliano. The villa was excavated between 2006 and 2010.

The location retains the name "Villamagna" attesting to the local memory of the imperial villa and its successive occupation as a monastery and lay community (casale), which have obscured the earlier remains.

It was recognised as imperial property from the elaborate and exceptional winery-cum-banquetting room described in letters by Marcus Aurelius in 140-5 AD.

== History ==
=== The Roman Period ===
The villa is likely to have been constructed over a Republican villa rustica. It may have become the property of Pompey the Great in the 60s BC and was taken over as imperial property after his sons' death. The villa was greatly expanded from the 120s AD and was used by Antoninus Pius (r.138-161). The elaborate winery and its use described in the letters of Marcus Aurelius indicate that the villa was used to hold an important regional religious and secular festival celebrating the vintage, the vendemmia for Latium. The power, wealth and extravagance of the emperor was emphasised in the winery which is an early form of ceremonial winery in imperial villas of the late 2nd to early 3rd century (such as the imperial Villa of the Quintilii) which replaced the earlier integration of ceremony and ritual in Republican and Augustan atria.

In 207 under Septimius Severus the road that led to the villa was paved, according to an inscription now in the cathedral of Anagni.

Sometime afterwards (Phase II) the winery was modified including a new semi-circular room. Later (Phase III), the winery was levelled and useful materials removed followed by abandonment and roof collapse.

==== Letter of Marcus Aurelius ====
At the age of 23, the future emperor Marcus Aurelius visited the villa where his adoptive father Antoninus Pius was staying. In letters to his tutor, Fronto, he describes two days spent there at a festival inaugurating the vintage of Latium:

We set out to hunt, did great deeds; we did hear that boars had been captured but saw nothing ourselves. We did climb a steep enough hill; then in the afternoon we came home, I to my books. So taking off my boots and my clothes I read on my bed for two hours Cato’s oration On the property of Pulchra and another in which he impeached a tribune. It is no good sending me books, for these have followed me here….

We are well. I overslept a little, because of my slight cold, which seems to have calmed down. From five until nine I read Cato’s Agricultura and wrote, less badly, thank god, than yesterday. Then I paid my respects to my father….Having cleaned my throat I went to my father and assisted him at sacrifice. Then I went to lunch. What do you think I ate? Just a little piece of bread, but I saw others devouring beans, onions and herrings filled with roe. Then we gave ourselves to the vintage, and sweated together and were joyous and so on, and as the author says ‘ we left some high bunches on the vines’. At the sixth hour we came home.

I studied a little and badly. Then with my little mother sitting on the bed I chattered a lot… The gong rang, that is, it was announced that my father was going to the bath. Then we, bathed, ate in the oil pressing room – we didn’t bath in it, but had dinner having bathed, and happily heard the peasants jesting.

=== Middle Ages ===
The earliest document attesting to the monastery dates from the 10th century and describes the foundation of the monastery by three nobles from Anagni. A series of very interesting charters and trials from the eleventh through 13th century speak to a small rural monastery with properties in the area of the original fundus, which despite its meagre size and income managed to become embroiled in regional and papal politics of the central Middle Ages, culminating in the suppression of the monastery in 1297 by Pope Boniface VIII. After the death of the monastery, the village remained at least for a little while, however, as it is referred to as a castrum in 1301 and 1333, and a castrum dirutum in 1478. The castrum walls and church are still standing today.

== The Site ==
The remains visible above ground, covering at least 12 hectares, consist of:

- three ranges of cisterns fed by an aqueduct which probably led from a spring at the base of the wooded hill
- a range of substructures (underlying a 19th-century casale) which were the basis villae for some part of the ancient villa, and
- various traces of substructures on the long ridge running down from the casale towards the road.

The most spectacular excavated building is the winery/banquetting hall which included a lavishly decorated dining area, baths and the wine production and storage areas with a large doliarium lying under the pressing floor, where the workers trod the grapes. The doliarium was paved with precious marble, as was the banqueting hall in front of it, where the emperor and his guests would have watched the ceremonial pressing of the grapes. In the same building were found the baths where the emperor and his suite bathed. Excavations brought to light vast quantities of exotic marble, mosaic and fresco which once decorated it. The complex was entered via a monumental staircase and corridor lined with marble with bands of pavonazetto and with white mosaic flooring. This building has similarities to that at the imperial Villa of the Quintilii near Rome.

The baths to the south had a different orientation to the winery and seem to be a separate building, but the monumental staircase and corridor connected the two parts and they are both clearly within the overall scheme. The marble panelled veneers of the walls of the staircase and corridor had a low dado of red portasanta marble above which was a moulding in white luna marble. The panels included portasanta, giallo antico and porphyry marbles and had collapsed onto the pavement where imprints in the mortar allowed their reconstruction.

The only other extensively excavated building is the so-called "barracks", to the north of the complex which includes 31 small rooms with beaten earth floors. Eight infants were found interred inside and the rooms have little decoration, some domestic pottery and some hairpins. The few hearths and storage vessels indicate it may have been for seasonal workers and the lack of contemporary burials indicates no stable labour force.

A possible nymphaeum lies beside the access road, and a possible amphitheatre or vivarium (for wild animal hunts) can be seen to the south from aerial photography. Of the pars urbana, or residential part, there are some remains of the villa entrance and finds show the luxury enjoyed at the villa.

== Sources ==
- M. Mazzolani, Anagnia (Forma Italiae, Regio I, vol. 6) (Rome, 1969).
- De Minicis, E. (1979–1982). "Il monastero di Villamagna e il suo territorio nell'alto medioevo". Bollettino dell'Istituto di Storia e di Arte del Lazio Meridionale. 11: 59–75.
- Scarpignato, A. (1979–1982). "Villamagna dalla metà del secolo XII e i suoi rapporti con gli abitanti di Sgurgola e Gorga". Bollettino dell'Istituto di Storia e di Arte del Lazio Meridionale. 11: 77–91. ISSN 0578-9850.
- Motta, R. (1979–1982). "Decadenza del monastero di Villamagna dalla fine del XIII secolo". Bollettino dell'Istituto di Storia e di Arte del Lazio Meridionale. 11: 93–103. ISSN 0578-9850.
- Monasticon Italiae. I. Roma e Lazio, ed. F. Caraffa (Cesena, 1981), pp. 122–3, n. 28.
- S. Carocci, "Ricerche e fonti sui poteri signorili nel Lazio meridionale nella prima metà del XIII secolo: Villamagna e Civitella", in Il sud del Patrimonium Sancti Petri al confine del Regnum nei primi trent’anni del Duecento. Due realtà a confronto, Atti delle giornate di studi, Ferentino 28-29-30 ottobre 1994 (Rome, 1997), pp. 112–44.
- Flascassovitti, C. D. (1994). Le Pergamene del Monastero di S. Pietro di Villamagna (976-1237). Lecce. hdl:11587/112092.
- De Meo, M. (1998). "S. Pietro di Villamagna presso Anagni: una villa romana si trasforma in abbazia". Quaderni di Architettura e Restauro. 2. Rome.
- G. Giammaria, ed. "Villamagna", Monumenti di Anagni 3 (Anagni, 1999).
- E. Fentress, S. Gatti, C. Goodson, S. Hay, A. Kuttner, M. Maiuro, "Excavations at Villa Magna", Fasti Online Documents & Research: 68
- E. Fentress, C. Fenwick, C. Goodson, S. Hay, M. Maiuro, "Excavations at Villa Magna", Fasti Online Documents & Research: 97
- D.Booms, F.Candilio, A. Di Miceli, C. Fenwick, E. Fentress, C. Goodson, M. McNamee, S. Privitera, R. Ricciardi. "Excavations at Villa Magna 2008". FOLD&R: 126.
- E. Fentress, C. Goodson, M. Maiuro. 2009. "Excavations at Villa Magna 2009". FOLD&R: 169.
- E. Fentress, C. Goodson, M. Maiuro,"Excavations at Villa Magna 2010". FOLD&R: 207.
- Fentress, Elizabeth; et al. (2016). Villa Magna: An imperial estate and its legacies: Excavations 2006–10. Archaeological Monographs of the BSR. Vol. 23. London: British School at Rome. doi:10.15184/aqy.2017.202. ISBN 978-0-904152-74-6.
