= Cambridge Studies in Medieval Life and Thought =

Academic Publication

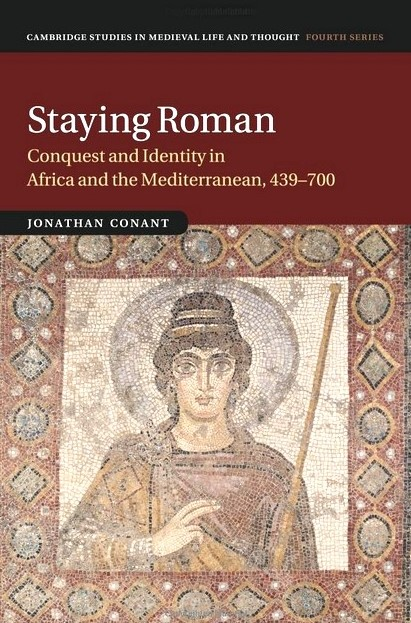
Staying Roman by Jonathan Conant, 2015, from the fourth series of Cambridge Studies in Medieval Life and Thought.

The Cambridge Studies in Medieval Life and Thought is a book series on medieval life and thought published by Cambridge University Press. The series was initiated by G.G. Coulton in 1921 and is now on its fourth series which is edited by Rosamond McKitterick.
