= Danville Correctional Center =

Prison in Danville, Illinois, United States

Coordinates: 40.1303°N 87.5365°W

- Interactive map of Danville Correctional Center
- Location: 3820 E Main Street Danville, Illinois
- Status: Open
- Security class: Medium
- Capacity: 1,854
- Opened: 1985
- Managed by: Illinois Department of Corrections
- Warden: Trent Allen

The Danville Correctional Center is an adult male prison of the Illinois Department of Corrections in Danville, Illinois. The facility is located about 5 miles east of central Danville and is located near the Illinois-Indiana border. The prison was opened in October 1985 and has an operational capacity of 1,854 prisoners.

Convicted child sex offender Amos Yee was incarcerated there.

== See also ==
- Education Justice Project
