= Early Medieval Europe (journal) =

- Discipline: History
- Language: English

Publication details
- Publisher: John Wiley & Sons
- Frequency: Quarterly

Standard abbreviations
- ISO 4: Early Mediev. Eur.

Indexing
- ISSN: 0963-9462 (print); 1468-0254 (web)

Links
- Journal homepage

Early Medieval Europe is a quarterly peer-reviewed academic journal covering the history of Europe from the later Roman Empire to the eleventh century. It is published by John Wiley & Sons.

== Abstracting and indexing ==
The journal is abstracted and indexed by:

- EBSCO databases
- Arts & Humanities Citation Index
- British & Irish Archaeological Bibliography
- Current Contents/Arts & Humanities
- GEOBASE
- International Bibliography of Periodical Literature
- ProQuest databases
- Scopus
