= Alatri Cathedral =

Roman Catholic cathedral in Alatri, Lazio, Italy

Coordinates: 41°43′30″N 13°20′39″E

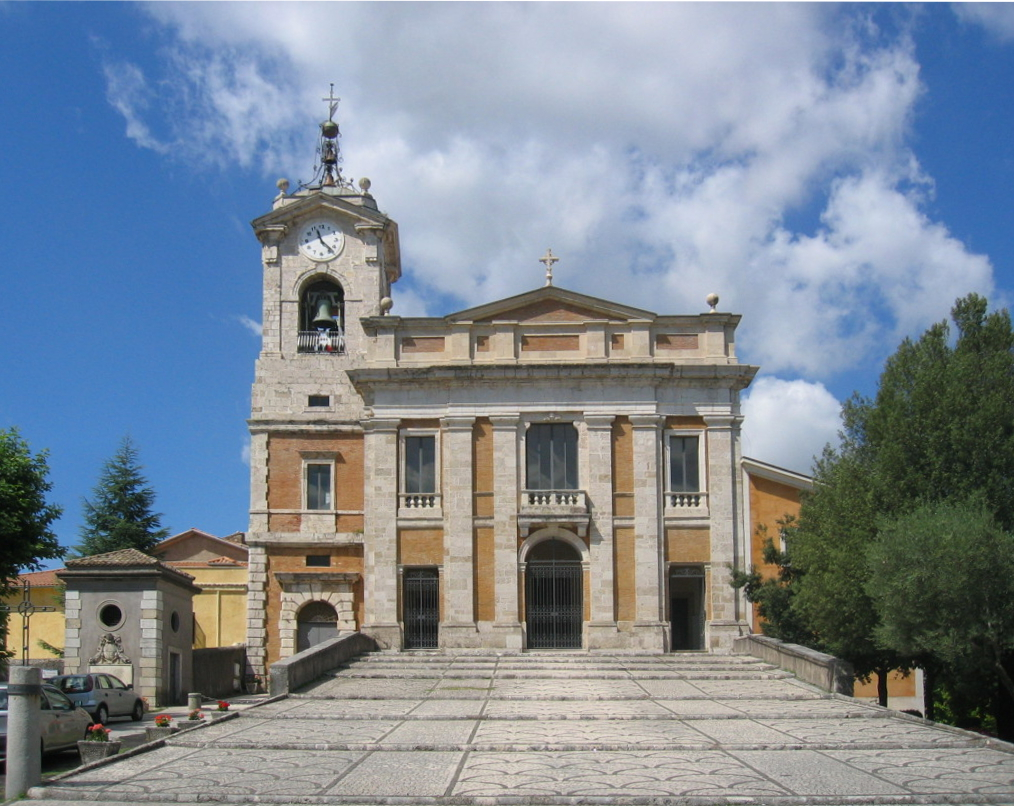
19th-century cathedral exterior

Alatri Cathedral, otherwise the Basilica of Saint Paul (Italian: Duomo di Alatri; Basilica concattedrale di San Paolo apostolo), is a Roman Catholic cathedral in Alatri, Lazio, Italy, dedicated to Saint Paul. It was formerly the cathedral of the Diocese of Alatri. Since 30 September 1986 it has been a co-cathedral of the Diocese of Anagni-Alatri. Pope Pius XII declared it a basilica minor on 10 September 1950.

== History ==
Location of Alatri Cathedral

The cathedral was built on what was once the centre of the acropolis of Alatri over the remains of an ancient shrine of the Hernici and of a temple dedicated to Saturn. References to a cathedral go back to the first half of the 11th century: a cathedral chapter is documented here in 930. Under Pope Innocent II (1130–1143), probably in 1132, the relics of the martyred saint Pope Sixtus I were translated here, and in honour of this the cathedral was refurbished: the main altar was completed in 1156. Further works took place through the 13th century, when in honour of the visit of Pope Honorius III the screen and the ambo, both by the Cosmati, were added, of which some traces still remain in the cathedral today.

During the 16th century the internal walls were painted with frescoes of episodes from the translation of the relics of Saint Sixtus, now hidden by the modernising works of the 17th and 18th centuries which produced the cathedral as it appears today. The present façade and campanile by Jacopo Subleyras were added between 1790 and 1808, and the cornice and the tympanum in 1884. Finally, in 1932 the Chapel of St. Sixtus was built to house the relics of Saint Sixtus, in commemoration of the 800th anniversary of their translation to Alatri.

During his visit to the diocese in 1950, Pope Pius XII granted the cathedral the status of basilica minor.

== Description ==
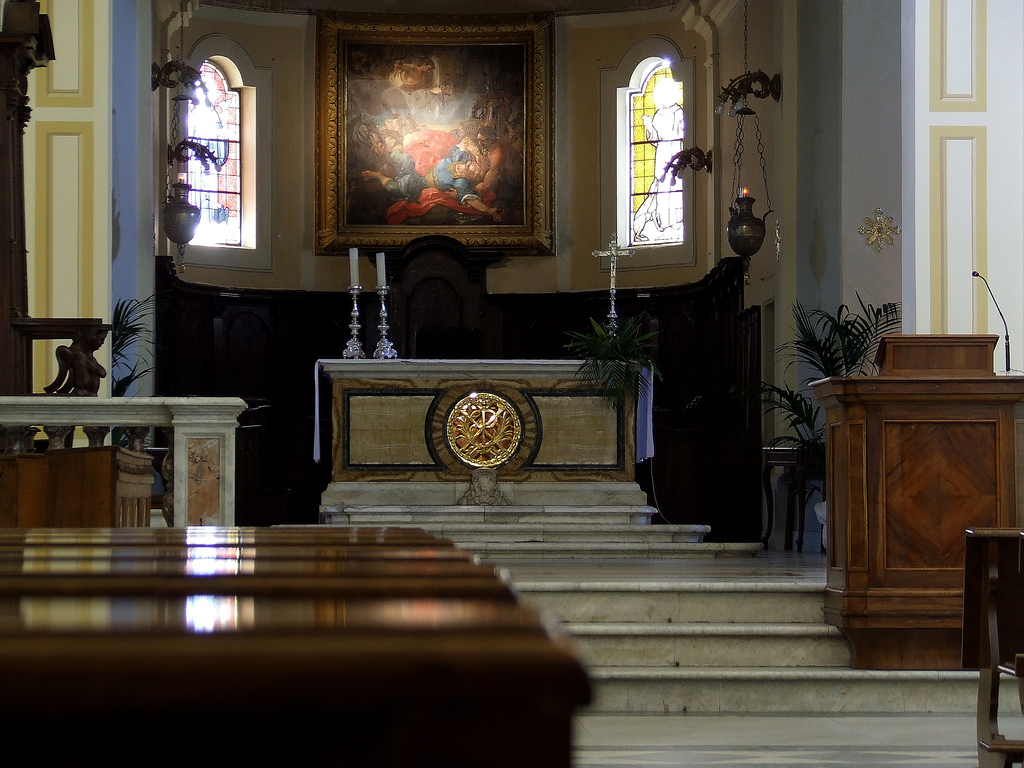
Interior detail

The façade, in stone and opus latericium, is from the end of the 18th century and the beginning of the 19th. The interior has a Latin cross ground plan, with three aisles separated by pilasters and a raised transept.

As well as the relics of Sixtus I, the cathedral also keeps those of the Roman Saint Alexander from the Catacombs of Callixtus, translated to Alatri in 1640, and the Ostia incarnata, from the Eucharistic miracle of Alatri of 1228. The cathedral's works of art include a copy of Guido Reni's Crucifixion; the face of Saint Sixtus in chased and repoussé silverwork (1584); and the Madonna del suffragio, a sculpted wooden group of figures executed in 1639.

In a chapel are the remains of Blessed Maria Raffaella Cimatti, transferred here on 27 March 2010 from the church of St. Benedict.
