= Alatri =

- Comune
- Comune di Alatri
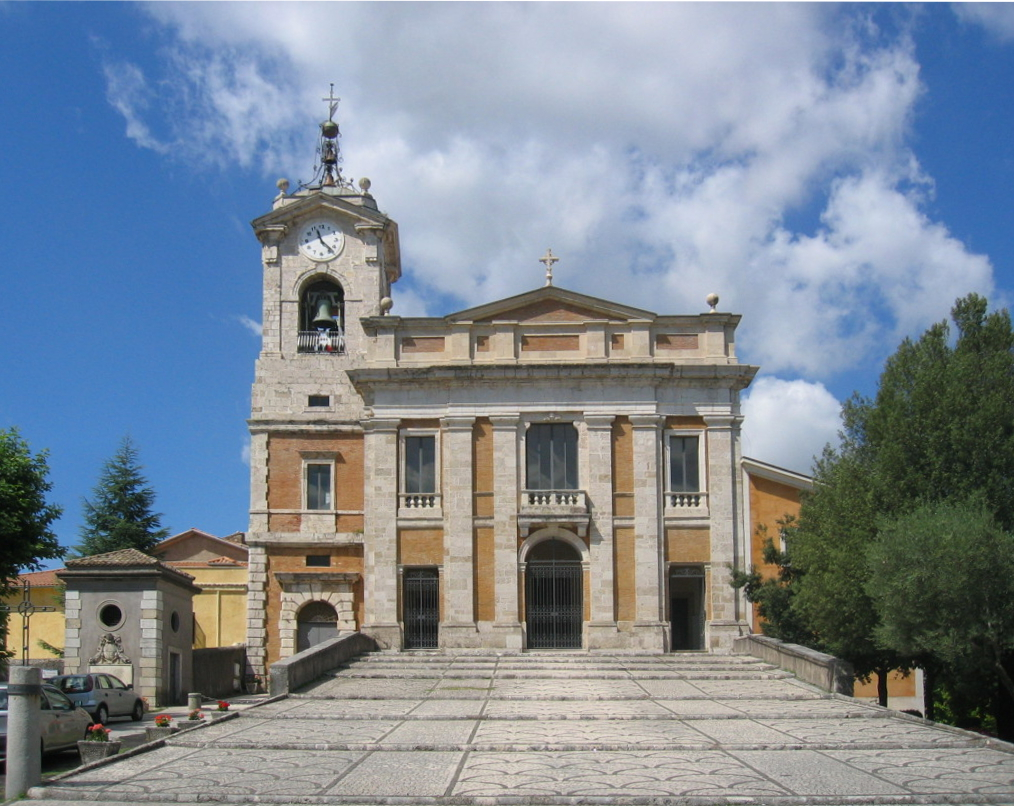
- Basilica of San Paolo.

- Coat of arms

- Location of Alatri in Italy Alatri (Lazio)
- Coordinates: 41°43′30″N 13°20′30″E
- Country: Italy
- Region: Lazio
- Province: Frosinone (FR)
- Frazioni: See list

Government
  - Mayor: Maurizio Cianfrocca (PD)

Area
  - Total: 97 km^{2} (37 sq mi)
- Elevation: 502 m (1,647 ft)

Population (30 April 2017)
  - Total: 28,807
  - Density: 300/km^{2} (770/sq mi)
- Demonyms: Alatresi, Alatrensi or Alatrini
- Time zone: UTC+1 (CET)
  - Summer (DST): UTC+2 (CEST)
- Postal code: 03011
- Dialing code: 0775
- Patron saint: St. Sixtus
- Saint day: First Wednesday after Easter
- Website: Official website

Alatri (Latin: Aletrium) is an Italian town and comune of the province of Frosinone in the region of Lazio, with c. 30,000 inhabitants. An ancient city of the Hernici, it is known for its megalithic acropolis.

== History ==
The area of the modern city was settled as early as the 2nd millennium BC.

Aletrium was a town of the Hernici which, together with Veroli, Anagni and Ferentino, formed a defensive league against the Volsci and the Samnites around 550 BC. In 530 they allied with Tarquinius Superbus' Rome, confirming the Etruscan influence in the area attested also by archaeology. Alatri was defeated by Rome in 306 BC and forced to accept the citizenship. In Cicero's time it was a municipium, and continued in this position throughout the imperial period.

After the fall of the Western Roman Empire, the city decayed, the only respected authority being represented by the Christian bishop. During the reign of Theodoric the Great (5th century AD) the patrician Liberius promoted the construction of a monastic community, one of the most ancient in the West, where in 528 St. Benedict sojourned briefly. In 543, during the Gothic Wars, Alatri was sacked and destroyed by Totila's troops.

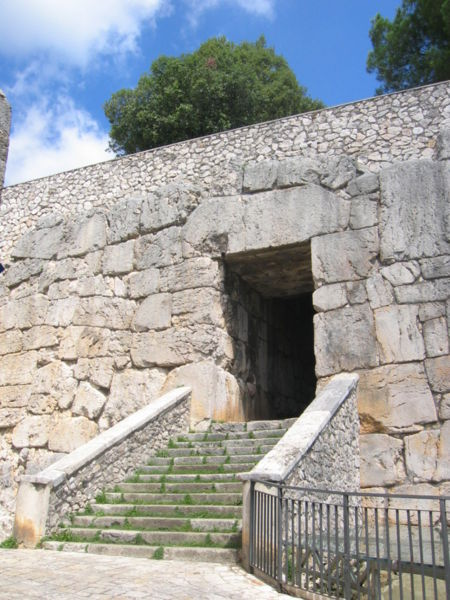
The Porta Maggiore.

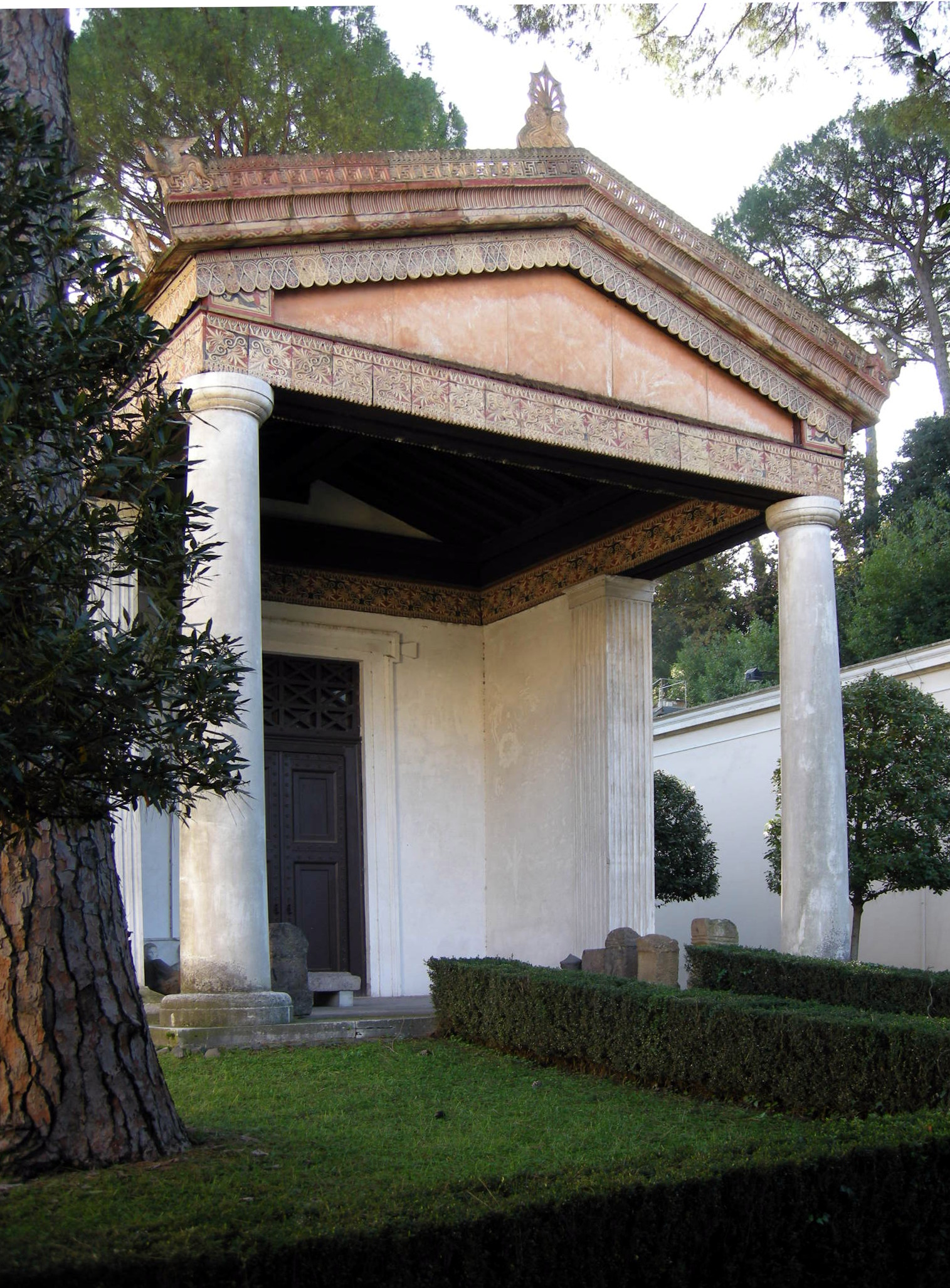
Reconstruction of Etruscan-style temple of Alatri in National Etruscan Museum, Rome.

In the 12th century the city became an important stronghold of the popes when they were obliged to leave the then unsafe Rome. In the following century it became a free commune, although under the authority of the bishops and the pope, governed by consuls until 1241, when a podestà was introduced. In the following centuries it flourished economically and expanded, conquering Collepardo, Guarcino, Trivigliano, Vico and Frosinone, though often hampered by inner strife. In the 15th century Alatri started to lose its freedom, due to the involvement of Ladislaus of Naples and Pope Martin V. After the short seigniory of Filippo Maria Visconti in 1434, the city had to accept papal suzerainty.

Struggles with the neighbouring communes continued, and in 1556 it was occupied by Spanish soldiers. During the Roman Republic, it remained loyal to the pope. During the Napoleonic occupation (1809–1814) numerous members of the papal administration, as well as bishop Giuseppe della Casa, were deported to France. It became part of Italy in 1870.

During World War II it suffered heavy destruction and human victims.

== Main sights ==
=== Ancient remains ===
Alatri has well-preserved polygonal fortifications constructed from well jointed local limestone. It is almost entirely an embanking wall, as is the rule in the cities of this part of Italy, with a maximum height, probably, of about 9 metres (30 ft). Two of the gates (of the perhaps five once existing) are still to some extent preserved, and three posterns are to be found.

In the centre of the city rises a hill which was adopted as the citadel. Remains of the fortifications of three successive periods can be traced, of which the last, perhaps a little more recent than that of the city wall, is the best preserved. In the first two periods the construction is rough, while in the third the blocks are very well jointed, and the faces smoothed; they are mostly polygonal in form and are much larger (the maximum about 3 by 2 m) than those of the city wall. A flat surface was formed partly by smoothing off the rock and partly by the erection of huge terrace walls which rise to a height of over 15 metres (49 ft), enclosing a roughly rectangular area of 220 by 100 metres (720 by 330 ft). Two approaches to the citadel were constructed, both passing through the wall; the openings of both are rectangular. The architrave of the larger, known as Porta Maggiore, measures about 5 metres (16 ft) in length, 1.5 metres (4.9 ft) in height, 1.8 metres (5.9 ft) in thickness; while that of the smaller is decorated with three phalli in relief. Later, though probably in ancient times, a ramp was added on the northern side. In the centre of the arx was a building on the site of the present cathedral, of which only a small portion is preserved. Remains of a high-pressure aqueduct, which supplied the town with water and was constructed with other public buildings by L. Betilienus Varus, may still be traced. A temple was excavated in 1889 about a half-mile north of the town, and many fragments of the painted terracottas with which it was decorated were found. A reconstruction of it has been erected in the National Etruscan Museum at Rome.

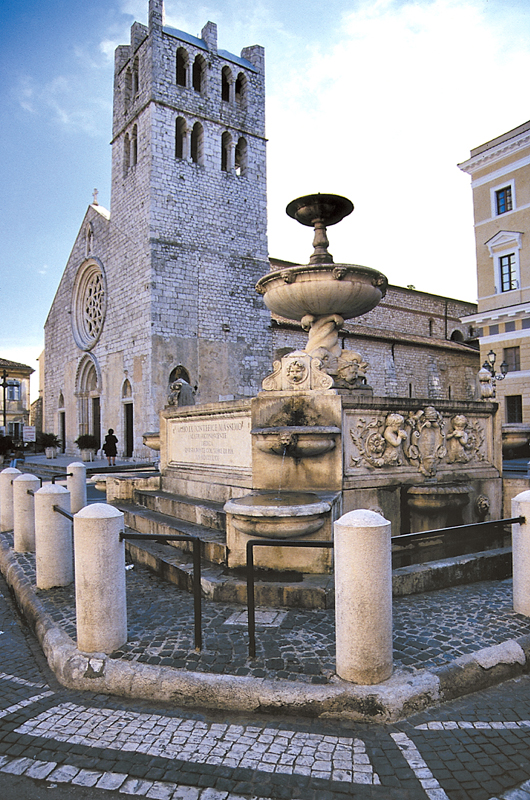
Church of Santa Maria Maggiore and Fontana Pia.

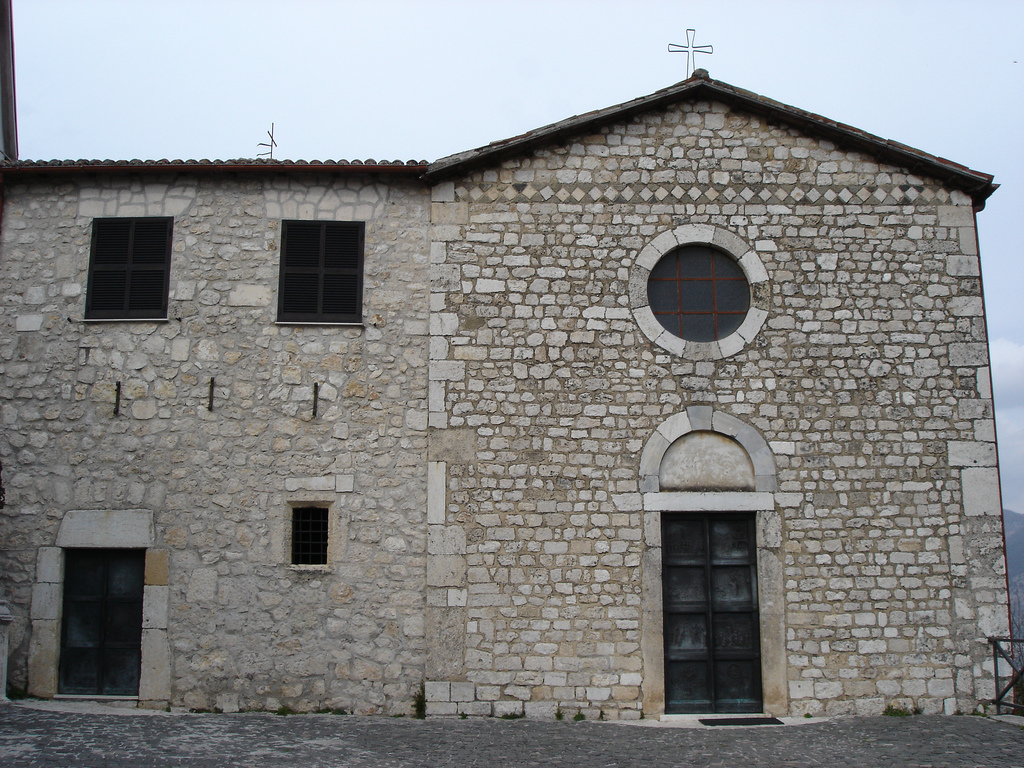
The ancient church of St. Sylvester.

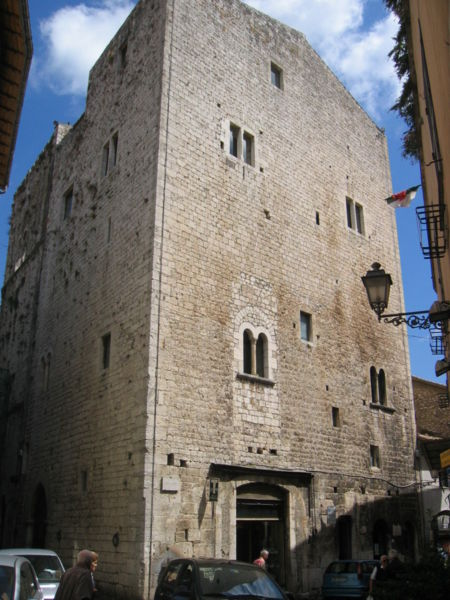
Palazzo Gottifredo.

=== Other ===
- Cathedral of San Paolo: main church, documented since 930, has Cosmatesque decorations dated to 1222, although the external facade is from a late–18th-century restoration. The layout is that of a Greek cross plan, with a long transept. One of the relics in the church, is the late 13th-century Ostia Incarnata; according to tradition it was a eucharistic wafer that miraculously transubstantiated into flesh.
- Collegiata of Santa Maria Maggiore: collegiate church likely first erected in the 5th century atop the site of a temple of Venus. First mentioned in 1137, it was restored in Romanesque times and largely rebuilt in the 13th century by craftsmen from Burgundy. The façade has a large 14th-century rose window. The three gates have frescoed lunettes with, in the central one, a Madonna with Child from the late 14th century. The bell tower was added in 1394; until an earthquake in 1654, it had a cusp cover. The sober interior has a nave and two aisles divided by robust pilasters, with an inner narthex. The left chapels are from modern restorations. Among the artwork housed in the church, a Constantinopolis Madonna (13th century), the Redeemer Tryptych by Antonio di Alatri, and a Madonna with Child and St. Salvatore (early 15th century).
- San Francesco: Gothic-style church built by the Franciscans in the late 13th century. It is a compact edifice with original gate and rose window similar to that of Santa Maria Maggiore. The interior has a single nave and Baroque decoration. It houses a Deposition painted by Neapolitan school (17th century), and partly ruined 15th-century frescoes. The most striking feature is however the relic of part of St. Francis' mantle, donated in 1222 to the city by the saint himself.
- Santo Stefano: Church from (c. 1000). Of the original edifice, only the main portal remains.
- San Silvestro: Church from (10th-11th centuries). It has two naves, the second added in 1331. The simple and evocative interior houses a precious fresco depicting St Sylvester and the Dragon (12th century). The crypt (9th century) has a fresco of a Blessing Saint in Byzantine style.
- Chiesa degli Scolopi (1734–1745)
- Gottifredo Palace (mid-13th century), the residence of the powerful feudatory cardinal Gottifredo di Raynaldo from Alatri. It is formed by two towerhouses in different styles. It houses the Town Museum.
- Public Records Office: located in the Piazza Santa Maria Maggiore, the registry houses all public records including Births, Deaths and Marriages for the city going back to the 18th century.

In the neighborhood are:

- The Castle of Osteria di Alatri, also known as La Grancia di Tecchiena.
- The Badia di San Sebastiano, built in the 6th century by Liberius.
- Chiesa delle XII Marie ("Church of the 12 Marys"), a small church from the early 15th century, with interesting frescoes of Saint by Antonio da Alatri

== Subdivisions ==
=== Rioni ===
Alatri is divided into the following rioni (quarters):

- Civette
- Colle
- Fiorenza
- Piagge
- Portadini
- San Simeone
- Santa Lucia
- Sant'Anna
- Sant'Andrea
- Scurano
- Spidini
- Valle
- Vineri

-

=== Frazioni ===
Chiappitto, Pacciano, Porpuro, Valle Santa Maria, Carvarola, Capranica, Fontana Vecchia, Maddalena, Piedimonte, Madonna delle Grazie, Melegranate, Montecapraro, Vignola, Valle Carchera, Montesantangelo, Montelarena, Pezza, Allegra, Basciano, Pignano, Castello, Collefreddo, Madonna del Pianto, Montelungo, Montereo, Monte San Marino, Pezzelle, Preturo, Sant'Antimo, San Valentino, Vallecupa, Vallefredda, Valle Pantano, Vallesacco, Valle S.Matteo, Villa Magna, Cassiano, Castagneto, Fraschette, Seritico, Santa Caterina, Vicero, Aiello, Canarolo, Collelavena, Costa San Vincenzo, Maranillo, Cavariccio, Colletraiano, Imbratto, Piano, S. Colomba, Scopigliette, Cucuruzzavolo, le Grotte, Magione, Mole Santa Maria, San Pancrazio, Vallemiccina, Sant'Emidio, Canale, Prati Giuliani, Quarticciolo, Quarti di Tecchiena, Tecchiena, Campello, Mole Bisleti, Cuione, Fontana Santo Stefano, Fontana Sistiliana, Frittola, S. Manno, Arillette, Collecuttrino, Colle del Papa, Laguccio, Montelena, Quercia d'Orlando, San Mattia, Carano, Fontana Scurano, Magliano, Cellerano, Fiume, Fiura, Fontana Santa, Riano, Abbadia, Case Paolone, Fontana Sambuco, Gaudo, Intignano, Colleprata.

== International relations ==
Alatri is twinned with:

- Clisson, France, since 2000
- Dirfys, Greece
- Gétigné, France, since 2003
- Gorges, France, since 2003
- Saint-Lumine-de-Clisson, France, since 2000
