= St Marie's Church =

St Marie's Church may refer to:

- St Marie's Church, Bury, Greater Manchester, UK
- St Marie's Church, Halifax, West Yorkshire, UK
- St Marie's Church, Rugby, Warwickshire, UK
- Cathedral Church of St Marie, Sheffield, South Yorkshire, UK
- St Marie's Church, Widnes, Cheshire, UK
- Tirana Catholic Church of St Marie, Tirana, Albania
- Ste. Marie Church (Manchester, New Hampshire)

== See also ==
- St Mary's Church (disambiguation)
- St Marie (disambiguation)
- Marie (disambiguation)
- Saint Marie (disambiguation)
- Sante Marie
