= Marie =

Marie may refer to the following.

== People and fictional characters ==
- Marie (given name), including a list of people and fictional characters with the name
  - List of people named Marie
- Marie (Japanese given name)
- Jean Gabriel-Marie, French composer
- Jean Gabriel Marie (1907–1970), his son, French romantic composer

== Arts and entertainment ==
=== Film, television and stage ===
- Marie (1980 TV series), an American television show
- Marie (1985 film), an American biography of Marie Ragghianti
- Marie (2020 film), a documentary short about homebirths
- Marie (talk show), hosted by Marie Osmond
- Marie (TV pilot), a 1979 American pilot with Marie Osmond
- Marie, a 2009 ballet by Stanton Welch

=== Literature ===
- Marie (novel), by H. Rider Haggard, 1912

=== Music ===
- Marie, a 2008 EP by the Romance of Young Tigers
- "Marie" (Cat Mother and the All Night Newsboys song), 1969
- "Marie" (Johnny Hallyday song), 2002
- "Marie" (Sleepy Hallow song), 2022
- "Marie", a 1929 song written by Irving Berlin that was a hit for Tommy Dorsey, Rudy Vallée, Nat Shilkret, Franklyn Bauer, The Four Tunes, and The Bachelors
- "Marie", a 1988 song by The Cockroaches, the flip-side of "Hey What Now!"
- "Marie", a song by Townes Van Zandt, popularized by Willie Nelson

== Places ==
- Marie, Alpes-Maritimes, France
- Marie, Arkansas, U.S.
- Marie, West Virginia, U.S.
- Lake Marie, Oregon, U.S.

== Ships ==
- SS Marie, several steamships
- USS Marie, several United States Navy ships

== Other uses ==
- Marie, Queen of Rodrigues, a statue of the Virgin Mary in Port Mathurin
- Marie biscuit, a type of sweet biscuit
- Mars Radiation Environment Experiment (MARIE), a spacecraft instrument

== See also ==
- Maria (disambiguation)
- Marie Antoinette (disambiguation)
- Mariya, a given name
- Mary (disambiguation)
- Saint Marie (disambiguation)
- Sainte-Marie (disambiguation)
