= Saint Maria =

Saint Maria is an alternative term for Mary, mother of Jesus.

Saint Maria may also refer to:

- Amandina of Schakkebroek (1872–1900), Belgian Catholic saint and Franciscan sister, also known as Saint Maria Amandina of Schakkebroek
- Carmen Elena Rendiles Martínez (1903–1997), Venezuelan Catholic saint and religious sister, known religiously as María Carmen
- Faustina Kowalska (1905–1938), Polish Catholic saint and nun, whose full name is Maria Faustina Kowalska
- María de las Maravillas de Jesús (1891–1974), Spanish Catholic saint
- Maria Goretti (1890–1902), Italian Catholic saint and martyr
- Maria Micaela Desmaisieres (1809–1865), Spanish Catholic saint and nun
- Maria Skobtsova (1891–1945), Russian Orthodox saint and martyr
- Maria Troncatti (1883–1969), Italian Catholic saint
- Mary Magdalene, Christian saint and disciple of Jesus, also known as Maria Madgalene
- Mary Magdalene de' Pazzi (1566–1607), Italian Catholic saint and nun, also known as Maria Magdalene de' Pazzi

== See also ==
- Saint Mary (disambiguation)
- Santa Maria (disambiguation)
- Saint Marie (disambiguation)
