= Sancta =

Sancta may refer to:

- Scala Sancta, a set of 28 white marble steps that are Roman Catholic relics located in an edifice on extraterritorial property of the Holy See in Rome, Italy
- Sancta Susanna, an early opera by Paul Hindemith in one act
- Sancta Civitas, an oratorio by Ralph Vaughan Williams
- Sancta Sanctorum, a Roman Catholic chapel entered via the Scala Sancta
- Sancta Sapientia or Hagia Sophia, Istanbul, Turkey
- Silvester Petra Sancta (1590–1647), Italian Jesuit priest, and heraldist

== See also ==
- Sancta Maria (disambiguation)
