= Palace of the Popes in Anagni =

Building in Anagni, Italy

Coordinates: 41°44′33″N 13°09′38″E

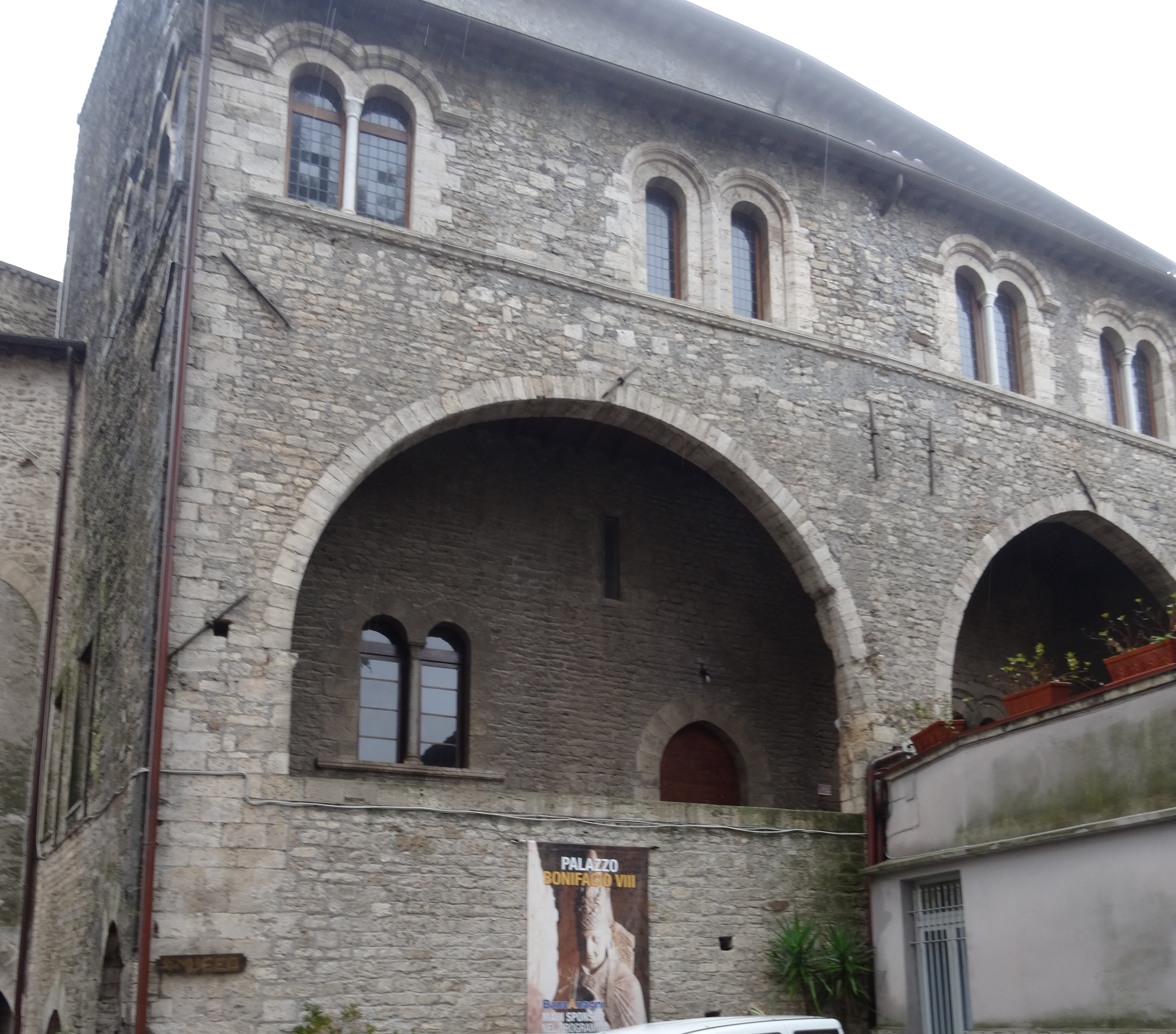
The Palace of the Popes in Anagni.

The Palace of the Popes in Anagni, sometimes called the Boniface VIII Palace (Palazzo Bonifacio VIII), is a building in the ancient hill town of Anagni in central Italy, in the hills east-southeast of Rome. It is closely associated in history with Pope Boniface VIII, was later bought by his nephew Peter II Caetani, and now houses a museum named after the Pope. It is at present part of a property owned by the Cistercian Sisters of Charity and used in part as their motherhouse.

== History ==
=== Ancient Prominence ===
There are multiple reasons for the papacy's ongoing interest in the Anagni area. Firstly, its proximity to Rome is of importance. Secondly, it has historically been used as a place for respite. In the days of the Roman Empire it is recorded that several emperors spent their summers in Anagni to escape the heat of Rome by means of the town's altitude and Rome's endemic diseases by means of the town's isolation. Visitors included Marcus Aurelius, Septimius Severus, Commodus and Caracalla. Later, the collapse of the Roman Empire brought with it a collapse of Anagni's population and parts of the lower town became overgrown.

=== Bishops and Popes ===
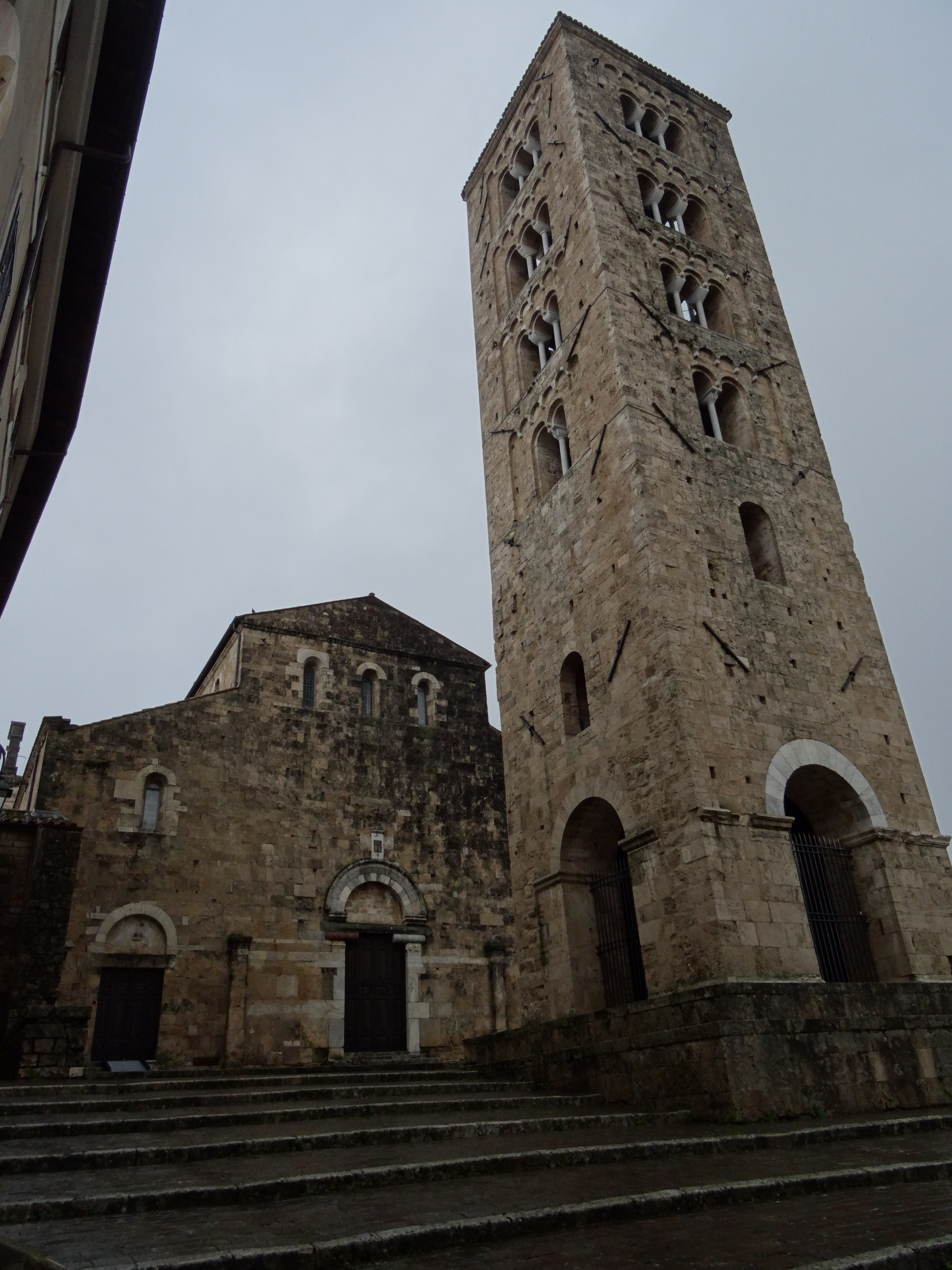
Front and Campanile of the Anagni Cathedral.

There has been a Bishop of Anagni since at least the 5th century, while the present Anagni Cathedral, known to have been built on the site of a temple dedicated to the goddess Ceres, dates to the 9th century.

The Popes, too, were active at Anagni. It was in Anagni in 1122 that Pope Callistus II promulgated the Concordat of Worms. Additionally, the Englishman Pope Adrian IV, born Nicholas Breakspeare, died there in 1159. In 1160, Pope Alexander III excommunicated the Emperor Frederick Barbarossa in Anagni Cathedral. This presence continued in other centuries, for in 1255 Saint Clare of Assisi was canonized in the same cathedral by Alexander IV (1254–1261). He likewise chose the same location to move to in the dispute between the University of Paris and the Mendicant Orders by condemning, on 5 October 1256, William of Saint-Amour's work De periculis novissimorum temporum (On the Dangers of the Last Days). This papal presence, as shown below, in later times intensified.

=== The Counts of Segni ===
It is difficult to disentangle the different construction phases of the various parts on the palace as it now exists. Some suggest there were seven phases in the construction: in the late 12th or early 13th century a late medieval fortification with two towers would have been incorporated into the main block, which would have led to a structure transversed by arches surmounted by wooden ceilings. The fact that the measurements employed seem to be French has led to the hypothesis that the workforce was French or French-trained, possibly through the Cistercian order. In fact, not far away, at Fossanova, Cistercian monks from outside Italy were working on the construction of Fossanova Abbey, consecrated in 1208 by Pope Innocent III, who was born Lothar of Segni at Gavignano near Anagni.

Arms of the Counts of Segni

Were this suggestion true, it would lend support also to the notion that Innocent had a role in the earliest structure on the site. However, the construction of the southern wing and two floors resting on the previous fortifications, along with the heightening of the wing to the north, would have been undertaken in the time of Innocent's next-but-one successor, Pope Gregory IX Conti, like Innocent, and a total of seven other popes, (including Clement III, Alexander IV and much later Innocent XIII), a member of the noble clan of the Counts of Segni. The enlargement of the east wing, on the other hand, was presumably the work of the Caetani.

Other hypotheses have proposed that most of it was simply built by Pope Boniface VIII, while others have thought it possible to identify no less than fifteen different phases of construction, nine traceable to the 10th-11th and 15th centuries, others in the earlier 13th century effected the joining of two separate residences of the end of the 12th century, thus creating a modest romanesque palazzetto with an adjacent tower. This would then have been modified later in the same century according to Gothic tastes and enlarged by powerful arches mounted on tall columns.

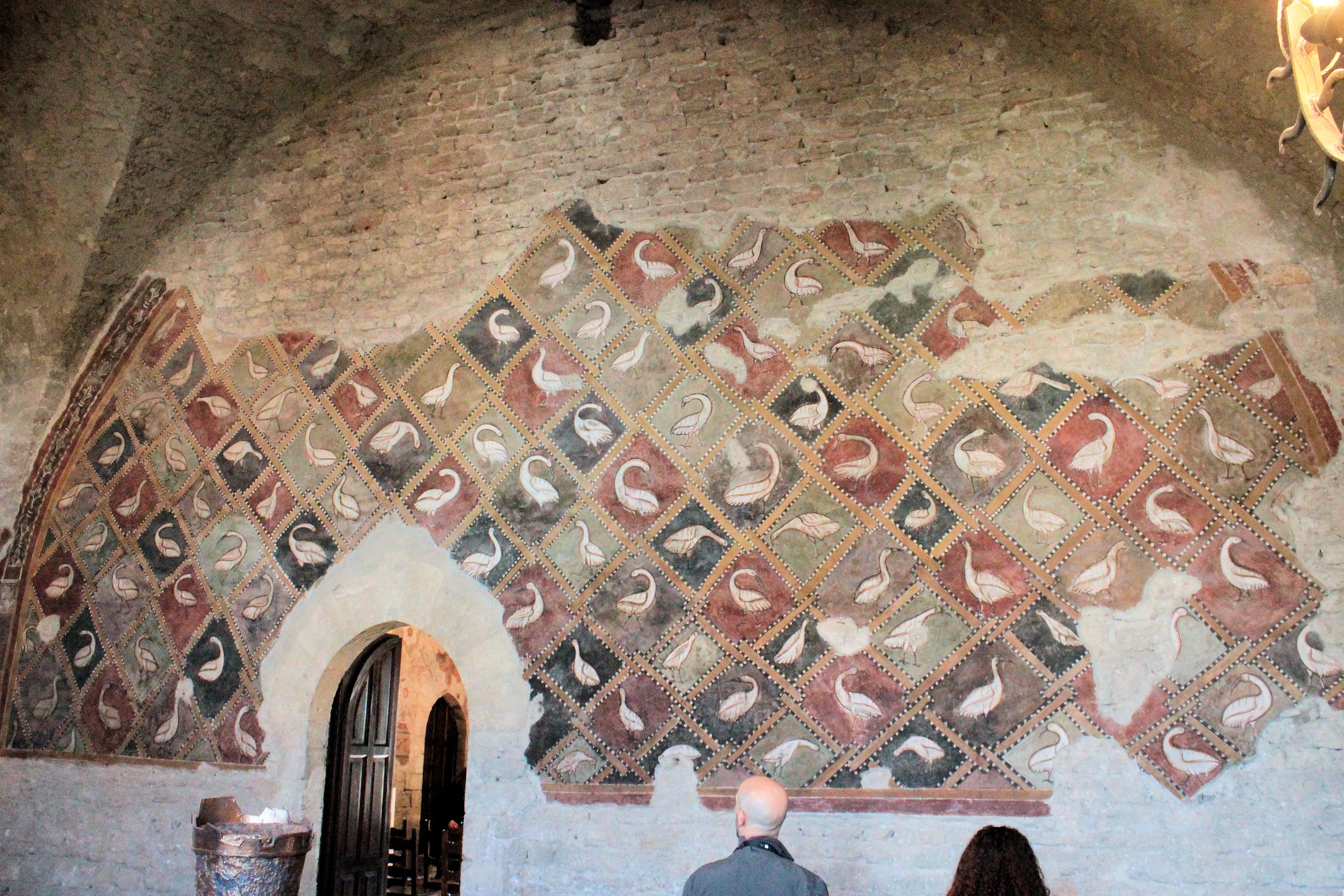
Sala delle Oche, west wall.

The sources leave no doubt as to the existence of a building already about the beginning of the thirteenth century, but archeological analysis of the stratification of successive constructions on the site suggests the presence of far earlier structures. The site certainly housed the residence of Ugolino Conti, Pope Gregory IX, which was referred to as maius (greater) given its prominence. Gregory had been born in Anagni and that construction was linked to a piece of land that had been owned by Pope Gregory's father, Matthias, and must have been completed by the first quarter of the thirteenth century, a period marked by an upsurge of building throughout Anagnil. Upon his election as Pope in 1227, Gregory assigned his possessions, including the palace, to his niece Maria, daughter of his brother Adinolf, while specifying his own right and that of his family members to live there.

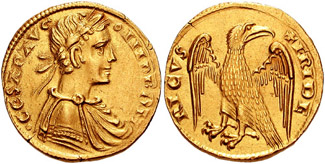
A gold “augustale” (1231–1250) depicting Frederick II as Emperor

Another of the first acts of Gregory's pontificate, one which reverberated far more widely, was his decision to excommunicate the Emperor Frederick II for failing to see through his participation in the Sixth Crusade in breach of a vow. This was accomplished by means of a solemn declaration made in Anagni Cathedral on 29 September 1227. Stung by this, Frederick attempted the following year an invasion of the Papal States. Its failure then forced him to seek reconciliation with the Pope. As a result, around 20 or 23 July 1230 the Treaty of San Germano was signed and the Pope's rescinding of the excommunication was not long in coming. This whole complex episode was played for all it was worth by both sides, the Pope displaying his triumph and the Emperor putting a brave face on events in as far as he could. On 1 September 1230 came the politically necessary personal encounter between Gregory and Frederick. In all this, it should be recalled that while the scion of a German dynasty, Frederick had been born in central Italy, at Jesi, near Ancona. The setting for this particular meeting between Pope and Emperor was the palace at Anagni, when it is said that the two 'sat together at table, in a splendid gathering of princes and notables', convoked to highlight the earnestness of their reconciliation. Frederick would not forget that visit, and in a letter of 1239, after a new clash with Gregory, accused the Pope of having lost sight of the poverty of the Apostle Peter, the proof being the residence he had created for himself at Anagni, a truly opulent royal palace. In this new clash of 1239, Gregory again launched an excommunication against Frederick, but the Pope did not see the end of the armed hostilities that followed, dying on 22 August 1241.

=== The 1243 Anagni Conclave ===
It was at Anagni, after the sede vacante of no less than 19 months which followed the 17-day pontificate of Celestine IV (died 10 November 1241), that Cardinal Sinibaldo Fieschi was elected Pope on 25 June 1243. Though apparently with considerable reluctance, he accepted the election and on 28 June was crowned as Pope Innocent IV. He left Anagni immediately, and when it became clear that not only was the struggle with the Emperor Frederick II not coming to an end but was intensifying, he fled Rome on 7 June 1244 in disguise for his native Liguria and four months later journeyed on to the city of Lyons, where he was received rapturously by the people and the civil authorities on 29 November 1244. There on 27 December that same year he convoked what became the 13th General (Ecumenical) Council of the Church, the first to be held in Lyon.

The connection between Innocent IV and Anagni was not at an end, for a decade or so later another important political summit of the papacy and the civil power took place there in 1254, when Innocent IV received there the ambassadors of the Kingdom of Sicily, in the presence of the cardinals and the people. The sources record that this took place in palatio domini Matthiae; Matthias was the son and heir of Maria Conti, to whom Gregory IX had in 1227 made over the palace.

=== Under Boniface VIII ===
The Caetani arms during the time of Boniface VIII

Despite the association of the building with the name of Pope Boniface VIII, it became the property of the Pope's family, the Caetani, only in 1297, some three years after Boniface (born Benedict Caetani) became pope. The property was purchased, perhaps with constraint, from Adinolf and Nicholas, described as the sons of Matthias de Papa, himself the son, as we saw, of Gregory IX's niece Maria Conti.

The purchaser was the Pope Boniface's nephew Peter II Caetani, son of the Pope's brother Roffredo, Count of Caserta, and the purchase was part of a determined campaign by the family over decades to acquire plots of land and houses around the area of Anagni Cathedral. As Benedict Caetani, Peter's uncle had already long been at work on this project and after his election he continued it, acquiring from 1283 by purchase or exchange an entire area of the town and building on a considerable scale, including the sizeable edifice known today as the Palazzo Traietto, the Caetani Chapel to the south of the cathedral, the residence of the canons, and enlargements to the bishop's residence (the Episcopio), which recent studies have shown was where the notorious Outrage of Anagni (Sciaffo di Anagni) took place.

It follows, then, that the Palace of the Popes in Anagni, otherwise known as the Boniface VIII Palace (Palazzo Bonifacio VIII), with a few structural modifications should be viewed in the context of an urbanistic programme that aimed at the creation of a family fortification on a site protected by the still-visible ancient walled defences of the local acropolis on the model of similar constructions contrived by the families of the Roman nobility. It also aimed at a prestigious display of status by means of the richness of its decorative features.

=== The Career of Boniface VIII ===
Formerly a chaplain to the pope, later a legate in France (1265) and in England (1266), a nuncio entrusted with the collecting of taxes (1269), notary to the pope (1276), Benedict Caetani, the future Boniface VIII drew notable levels of finance from the ecclesiastical benefices he managed to acquire, including a canonry and further benefice at Anagni Cathedral from 1250 onwards, a canonry at Todi from 1260 and another at Saint Peter's, Rome, from 1281. The various roles he exercised and the benefices allowed him to amass notable amounts. It is said that on 3 May 1297, when Stefano Colonna carried off the treasure that Boniface was having something in the region of 160,000 florins transported so as to purchase various lands from the Annibaldi family, in pursuit of the plan to piece together a personal estate. The Colonna later accused him of having extorted money from his subjects precisely for that purpose. Without evidence this remains a brazen calumny and the hostility of the Colonna family was demonstrated later. Boniface had entered into conflict with King Philip IV of France in 1296 starting with taxes the king imposed on the clergy, but escalating over time till the moment troops attacked the pope's residence in Anagni on 7 September 1303 and held him prisoner. Boniface was held for three days and beaten badly until the local people of Anagni rose against the invaders and released him. The pope pardoned his captors and returned to Rome on 13 September 1303, badly shaken physically and psychologically, and died a month later, of a high fever or of "profound chagrin". The personal assault on Boniface is known as the Outrage of Anagni (Sciaffo di Anagni). An ultimate ignominy was Philip's pressurizing Pope Clement V of the Avignon Papacy into staging a posthumous trial of Boniface. Clement also obliged Philip in 1312 by suppressing the king's creditors, the Order of Templars, who were similarly vilified.

Despite the sad end of Boniface VIII, it should be recalled that he declared the first great Roman Jubilee or Holy Year in 1300, an innovation that would mark the Catholic Church and European society, and impact permanently for centuries the economy of Rome and its environs.

Rome was already the destination for large numbers of pilgrims who were overwhelmed by misfortune but spurred on by their Christian faith. In response to this phenomenon, Boniface VIII issued a bull, Antiquorum habet fida relatio, on 22 February 1300, granting a plenary indulgence to pilgrims or Roman residents undertaking certain visits to the basilicas of St. Peter and St. Paul in Rome. As news spread, this led to tens of thousands of pilgrims visiting Rome, including Dante Alighieri and the artists Cimabue and Giotto. Although not used in the document, this came to be described as the “jubilee year”, and later still popularly as a "holy year", which Pope Boniface VIII intended to recur every hundred years, though the interval has varied over the centuries.

=== After the Caetani ===
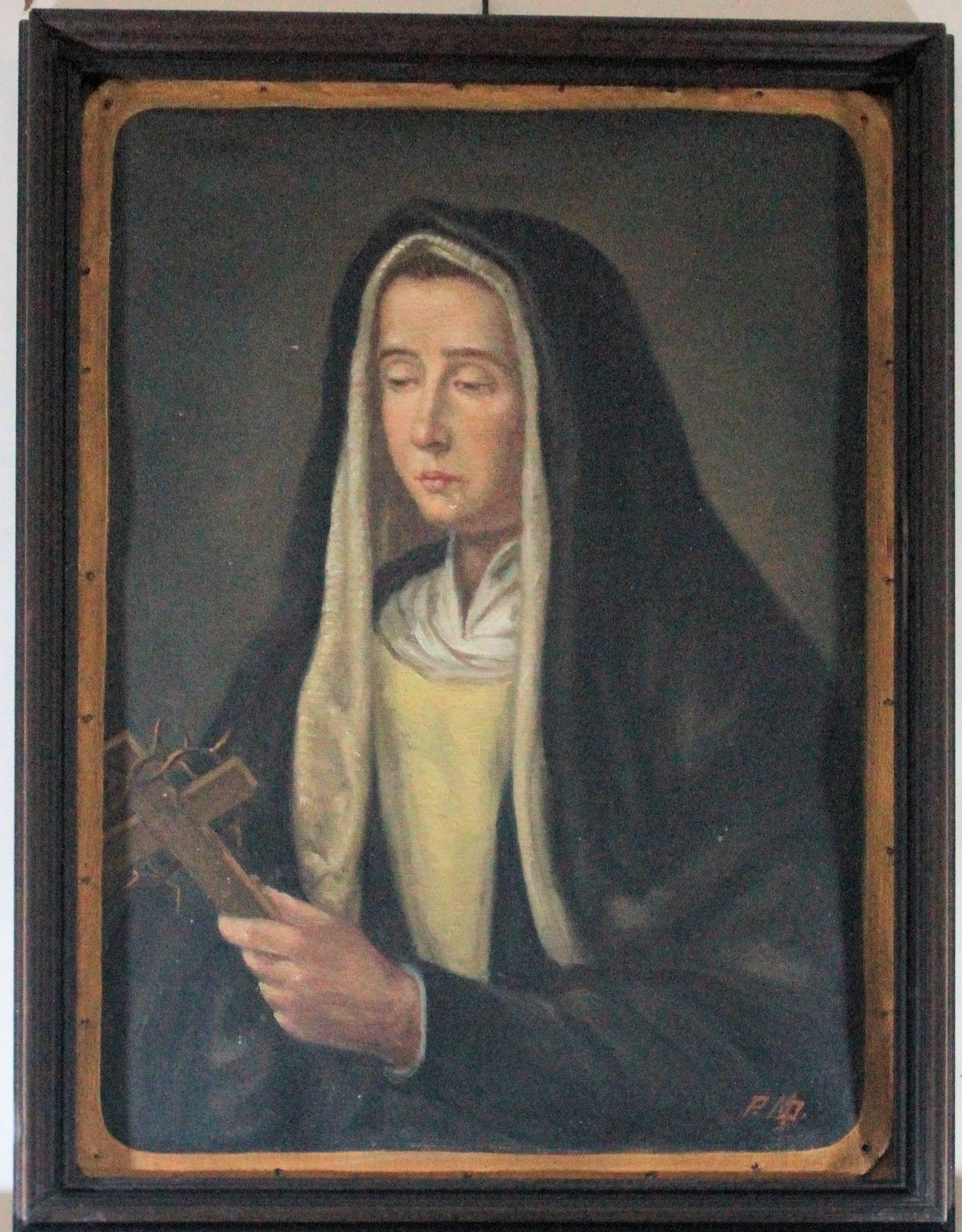
Mother Claudia De Angelis

The palace remained in the Caetani family till 1690, when it passed by the terms of the will of Marquis Orazio Caetani to the noble but impoverished Astalli family, with whom the Caetani had connections through intermarriage. In 1764 the last of this family, Tiberio degli Astalli the Younger, died in debt and it was then that the Cistercian Sisters of Charity, founded within living memory by the local woman Claudia de Angelis (1675–1715), acquired ownership, making it part of their adjacent motherhouse, a relatively recent construction. This operation, which created a property of no mean size, included turning some of the halls into grain stores and others into part of a girls’ convent school and of other works run by the Sisters. Other than the museum and the convent, the building continues to house an elementary school. From the early eighteenth century onwards the basic structure of the palace did not undergo further modifications of any importance, but merely maintenance work and occasional changes of use.

== The Museum ==
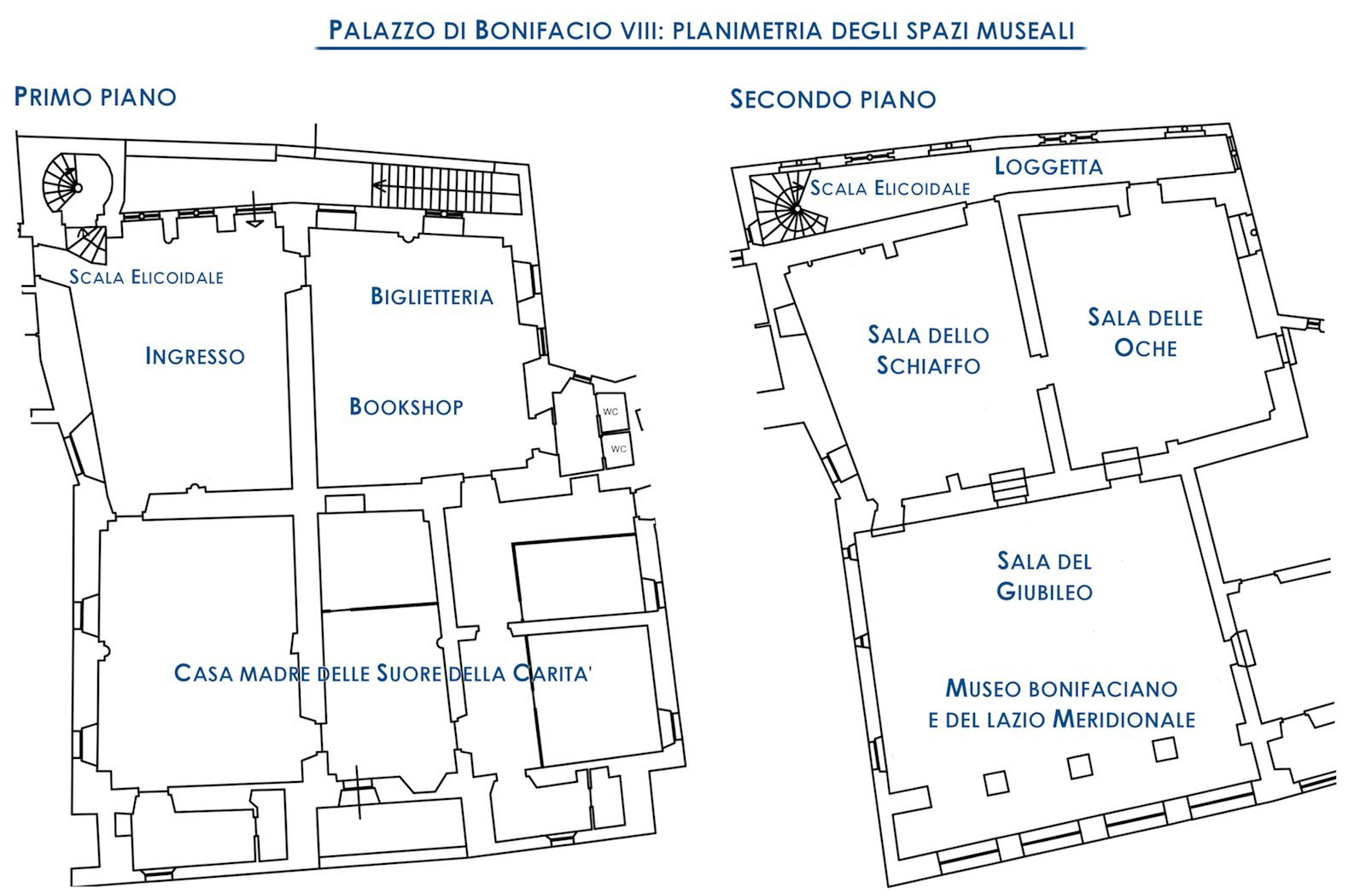
Ground plan of the museum areas in the Anagni Palace of the Popes.

In 1950 the archeologist Giuseppe Marchetti Longhi created a permanent exhibition on the site about Pope Boniface VIII and the first great Christian Jubilee of 1350. From these beginnings the exhibition gradually grew after 1953 with additional archeological finds, plaster casts, photographs, maps and historical documentation and was given the name Museo bonifaciano e del Lazio meridionale (Boniface Museum of Southern Lazio). It was the first public museum in Anagni. In the decade after the year 2000, it was reorganized to become a distinct section within a larger museum of the Anagni Palace of the Popes. This latter was designed to more clearly highlight the architectural structure of the building, its historical importance, and consistent religious character through the centuries by organizing an interesting route for those visiting the complex. Apart from the inherent historical significance of the older rooms, a certain number of collections are included which are linked to episodes that occurred throughout the centuries.

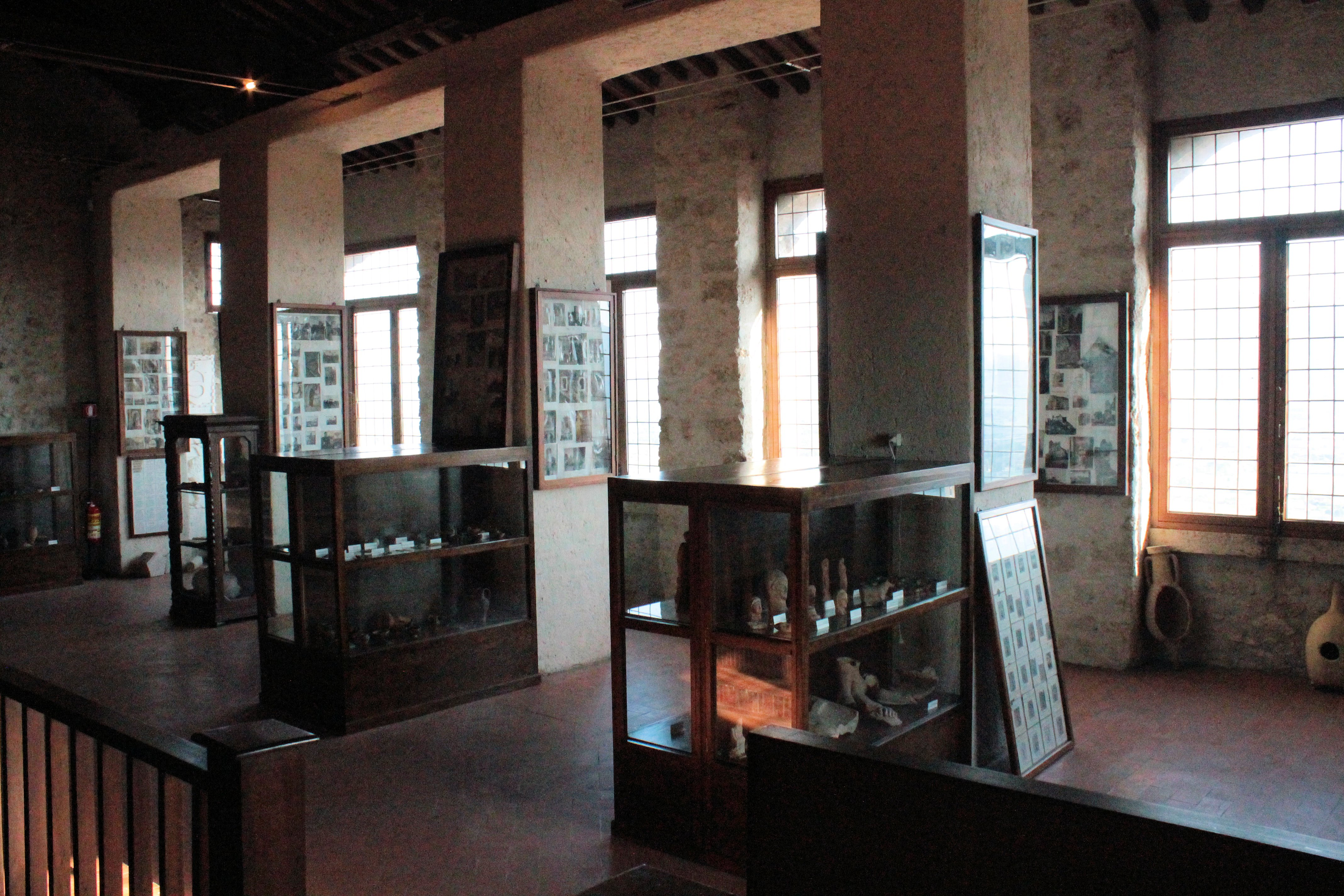
Interior of the museum.

=== Collection of Inscriptions ===
An example of the inscriptions can be found on the ground floor, in what is named the Sala delle Lapidi. This contains a collection of marble slabs or substantial memorial plaques in marble, many of which display inscriptions or occasionally depictions of figures. The inscriptions, in Latin and Greek, whether pagan or Christian, were found in various of the Roman catacombs, including those of Calepodius, Commodilla, Domitilla, Callixtus, Saint Agnes, and Priscilla.

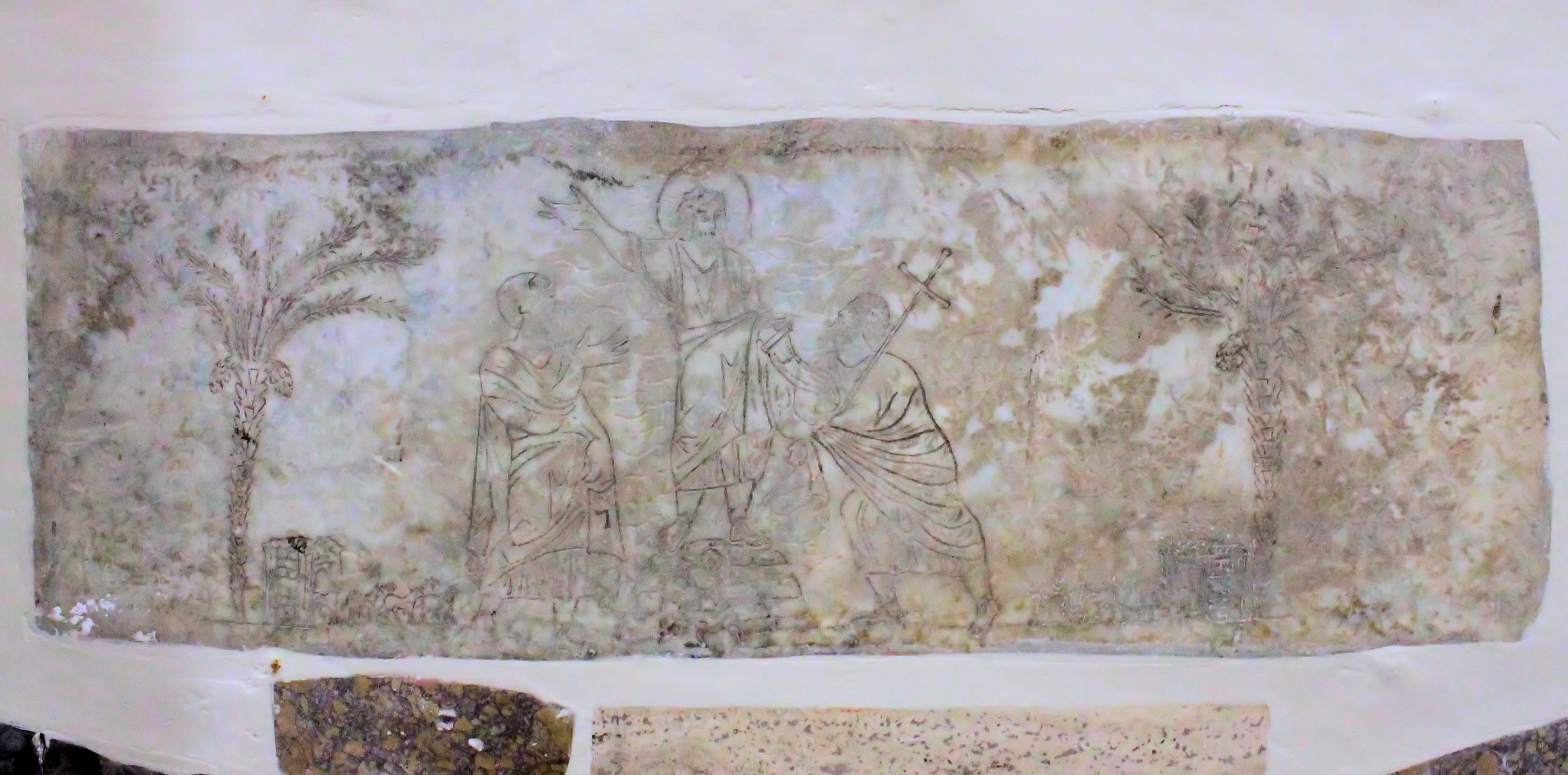
Traditio legis, depiction on marble

These marble pieces were brought to Anagni from 1720 onwards and incorporated into the pavement and along the walls of the Sisters’ church. The initiative came from Marcantonio Boldetti and Giovanni Marangoni, both involved in the foundation of the Cistercian Sisters of Charity, and both official overseers of the Roman catacombs in the years 1700–1753. In the early years of the twentieth century the slabs were moved once more and located as at present on the instruction of the Bishop of Anagni, Antonino Sardi (1849–1917).

One of the most notable and exquisite pieces in this collection is a depiction, dated to about 390 A.D., of the iconographical topos, the Traditio legis, with Christ handing down the New Law to the Apostles Peter and Paul. The slab bearing this image was apparently not used to close a tomb, but was a decorative feature within the tomb where it was discovered.

=== Modern Art Collection ===
A perhaps unexpected feature of the Anagni museum is its inclusion of a modern art collection, which boasts bronzes of Tommaso Gismondi and terracotta sculptures of Antonio Menenti, both local artists, imbued with a sense of its illustrious past, particularly in relation to the popes.

== Bibliography ==
- Thomas S.R. Boase, Boniface VIII, Constable, London, 1933.
- Bartolommeo Capasso, 'Historia diplomatica Regni Siciliae', in Atti della Reale Accademia di archeologia lettere e belle arti Societa reale di Napoli 6/2 (1872) 77.
- Giovanni Carbonara, 'Sul cosiddetto Palazzo di Bonifacio VIII in Anagni. Dalla storia al restauro', in Palladio 3 (1989) 19–60.
- Dimitri Cascianelli, 'Pasquale Testini e la Traditio legis di Anagni. Una copia del mosaico absidale dell'antica basilica di S. Pietro in Vaticano in una lapide romana', in Fabrizio Bisconti & Matteo Braconi, (edd.), Incisioni figurate della Tarda antichità (Roma, 22-23 marzo 2012), Città del Vaticano, 2013, pp. 623–646.
- Jean Coste, Boniface VIII en procès: articles d'accusation et dépositions des témoins (1303-1311), L'Erma di Bretschneider, Roma, 1995.
- Eamon Duffy, Saints and Sinners, History of the Popes, Yale University Press, 1997.
- Rossana Ferretti, 'I palazzi di Gregorio IX e Bonifacio VIII', in Storia della Città 18 (1980) 62–76.
- Olivier Hanne, De Lothaire à Innocent III. L’ascension d’un clerc au XII siècle, Presses universitaires de Provence, Aix-en-Provence, 2014.
- Achille Luchaire, Innocent III, Rome et l’Italie, Hachette, Paris, 1904.
- Michele Maccarrone (ed.), Chiesa e Stato nella dottrina di papa Innocenzo III, Ateneo lateranense, Roma, 1941.
- Michele Maccarrone Studi su Innocenzo III, Padua, 1972.
- Michele MaccarroneNuovi studi su Innocenzo III, Istituto storico italiano per il Medio Evo, Roma, 1995.
- Giuseppe Marchetti Longhi, ‘Ricerche sulla famiglia di Papa Gregorio IX’, in Archivio della Real Società Romana di Storia Patria, 67 (1944) 282.
- James M. Powell, Innocent III: Vicar of Christ or Lord of the World?, Catholic University of American Press, Washington DC, 2nd ed. 1994.
- Janet E. Sayers, Innocent III: Leader of Europe 1198–1216, Longman, London & New York, 1994.
