= Boudigau =

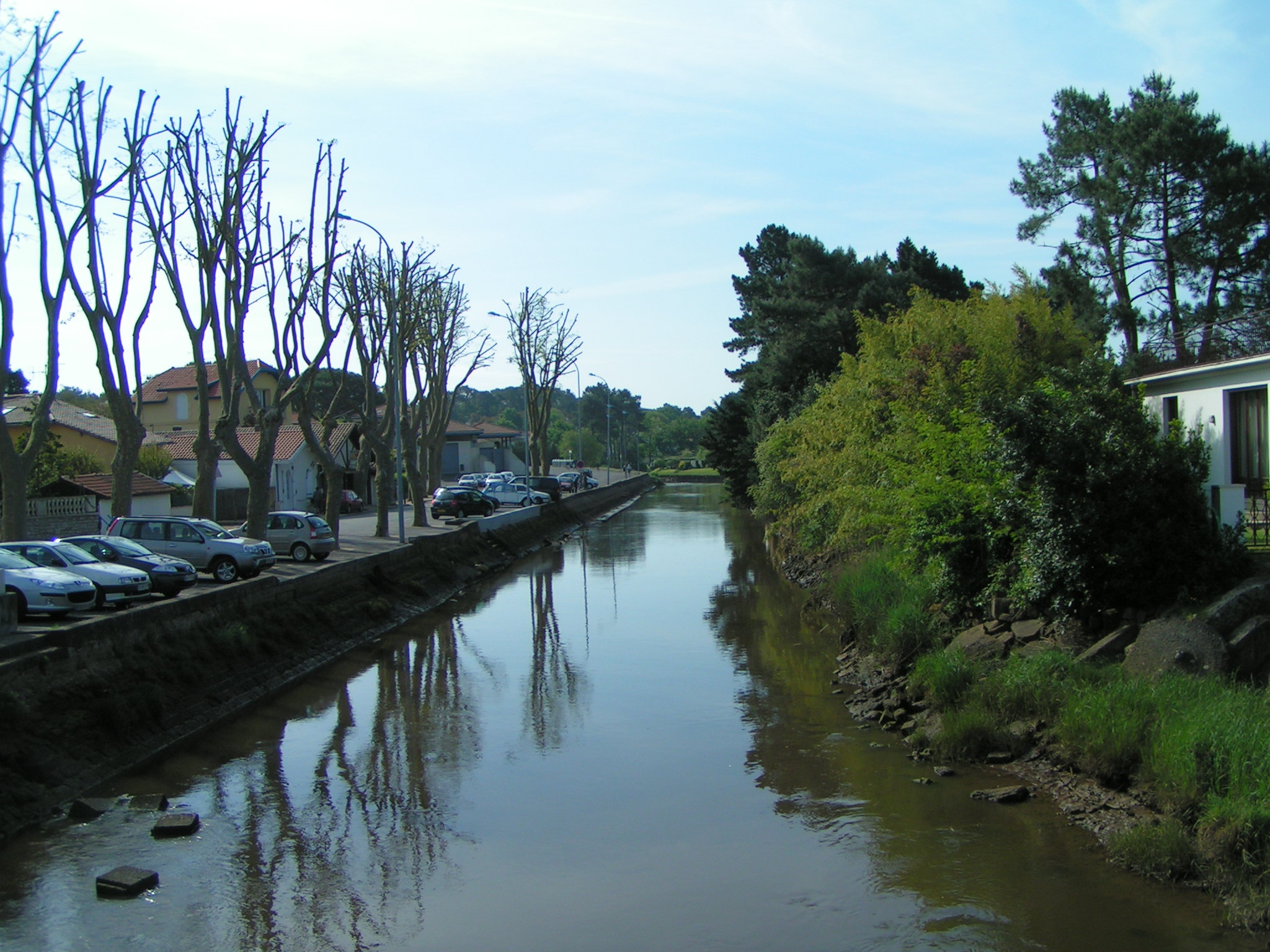
- The Boudigau in Capbreton

Location
- Country: France

Physical characteristics
- Source
  - location: Landes
- Mouth: Atlantic Ocean
  - coordinates: 43°39′20″N 1°26′48″W
- Length: 24.5 km (15.2 mi)

The Boudigau (French pronunciation: [budiɡo]) is a coastal river of the Landes, in Aquitaine, Southwest France. It is 24.5 km (15.2 mi) long.

It collects waters of the Orx marsh, in Maremne, and flows north behind the dunes fronting the Atlantic Ocean. It flows into the sea, between Capbreton and Hossegor, through the old estuary of the Adour, an estuary which is shared by another coastal river, the Bourret.

Owing to this estuary, Capbreton is the only port between Bayonne and Arcachon. Formerly a fishing port, Capbreton is today more of a resort.

== Départements and towns ==
- Landes: Labenne, Capbreton, Hossegor
