= Claudia de Angelis =

Italian professed religious

Servant of God Claudia of the Cross TOSD SCC
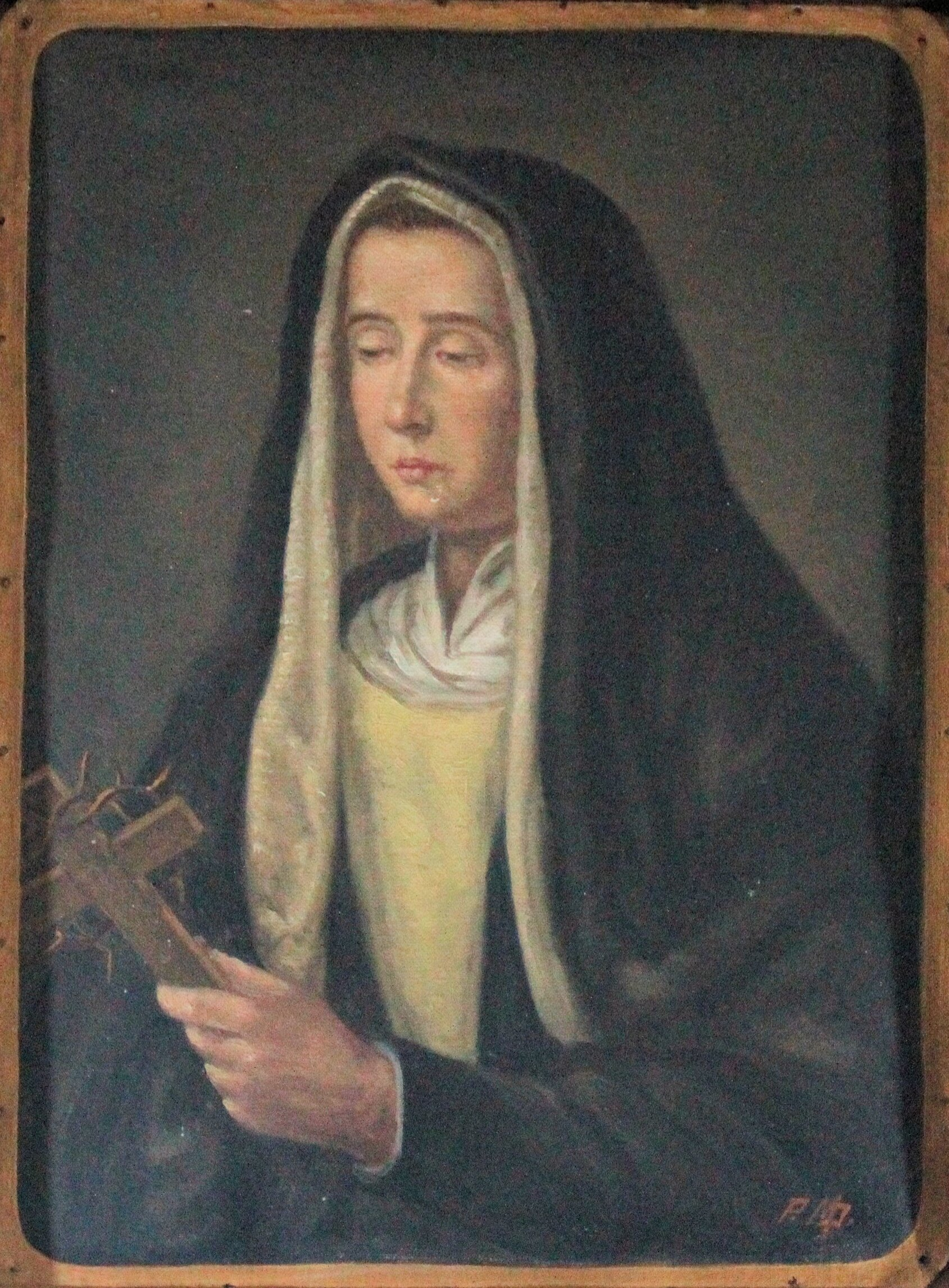
- Born: 5 April 1675; Anagni, Frosinone, Italy
- Died: 29 June 1715 (aged 40); Rome, Italy

Claudia de Angelis (religious name: Claudia of the Cross; 5 April 1675 – 29 June 1715), was an Italian lay Dominican who founded the religious congregation Suore Cistercensi della Carità (Cistercian Sisters of Charity), current owners of Palace of the Popes in Anagni.

Much of De Angelis' life was recorded by the priest Giovanni Marangoni, who was her spiritual father and strong supporter. He published a book entitled Vita di Suor Claudia De Angelis. Her canonization cause was opened on 26 June 1820. She is designated as a "Servant of God".

== Biography ==
De Angelis was born in Anagni on 5 April 1675 as the fourth child of six children. Her parents, Alessandro De Angelis and Elisabetta Spinelli, came from noble families. In her childhood, she suffered a fragile health and this was also due to her mother's neglect.

She immediately stood out for her strong spirituality and, around the age of 10, had her first vision of Jesus who spoke to her about a "heavenly marriage". It was from that moment that she had daily apparitions of Saint Catherine of Siena who, together with the Virgin Mary and Saint Rose of Viterbo, would become her teacher and spiritual guide.

In 1698, some young women in Anagni began to follow her and build prayer group with her which pushed De Angelis to fulfill her promise to establish a religious school for female education. She joined the Third Order of Saint Dominic on December of the same year. On 25 May 1709, renting a house near the Church of Ss. Cosma and Damiano she founded the Pious School of Charity. It was placed under papal protection in 1713 by Pope Clement XI.

In March 1703, De Angelis moved first to Marino and, later, to Rome where she continued her work of educating women. There her health started to deteriorate compelling her to return to Anagni. It worsened in the following years. She died on 29 June 1715 in Rome. Before dying she managed to definitively establish the regulations of the school and affiliate the nun teachers with the Cistercian Order.

== Literature ==
- Patrizia Piva: Sulle orme di madre Claudia: Claudia De Angelis della Croce: un'impronta carismatica nella Chiesa. Congreagazione Suore Cistercensi della Carità, 2001.
