= Sancta Maria =

Sancta Maria refers to Saint Mary, mother of Jesus Christ.

Sancta Maria may also refer to:

== Places ==
- Sancta Maria Abbey, Nunraw, a Trappist monastery
- Sancta Maria College, girls Catholic school in Ballyroan, Rathfarnham, Co. Dublin
- Sancta Maria College, New Zealand, co-ed Catholic School in Auckland, New Zealand
- Sancta Maria, Mater et Regina, Seminarium (also known as Saint Mary, Mother and Queen, Seminary), seminary of the Archdiocese of Capiz, Philippines
- Lyceum Sancta Maria, Catholic secondary school in Haarlem, Netherlands

== People ==
- Alphonsus a Sancta Maria, or Alphonso de Cartagena (1396–1456), Spanish historian
- Honoratus a Sancta Maria (1651–1729), French Discalced Carmelite.
- Tomás de Sancta María (ca. 1510 – 1570), Spanish music theorist, organist and composer of the Renaissance

== Music ==
- "Sancta Maria" (song), a classical aria based on the Intermezzo from the opera Cavalleria rusticana, composed by Pietro Mascagni
- "Sonata sopra Santa Maria" ("Sancta Maria, ora pro nobis"), a section of Monteverdi's Vespro della Beata Vergine (1610)

== See also ==
- Sancta (disambiguation)
- Saint Mary (disambiguation)
- Santa Maria (disambiguation)
- Sainte-Marie (disambiguation)
- Saint Mary's (disambiguation)
