= Saint-Martin-de-Hinx =

- Commune
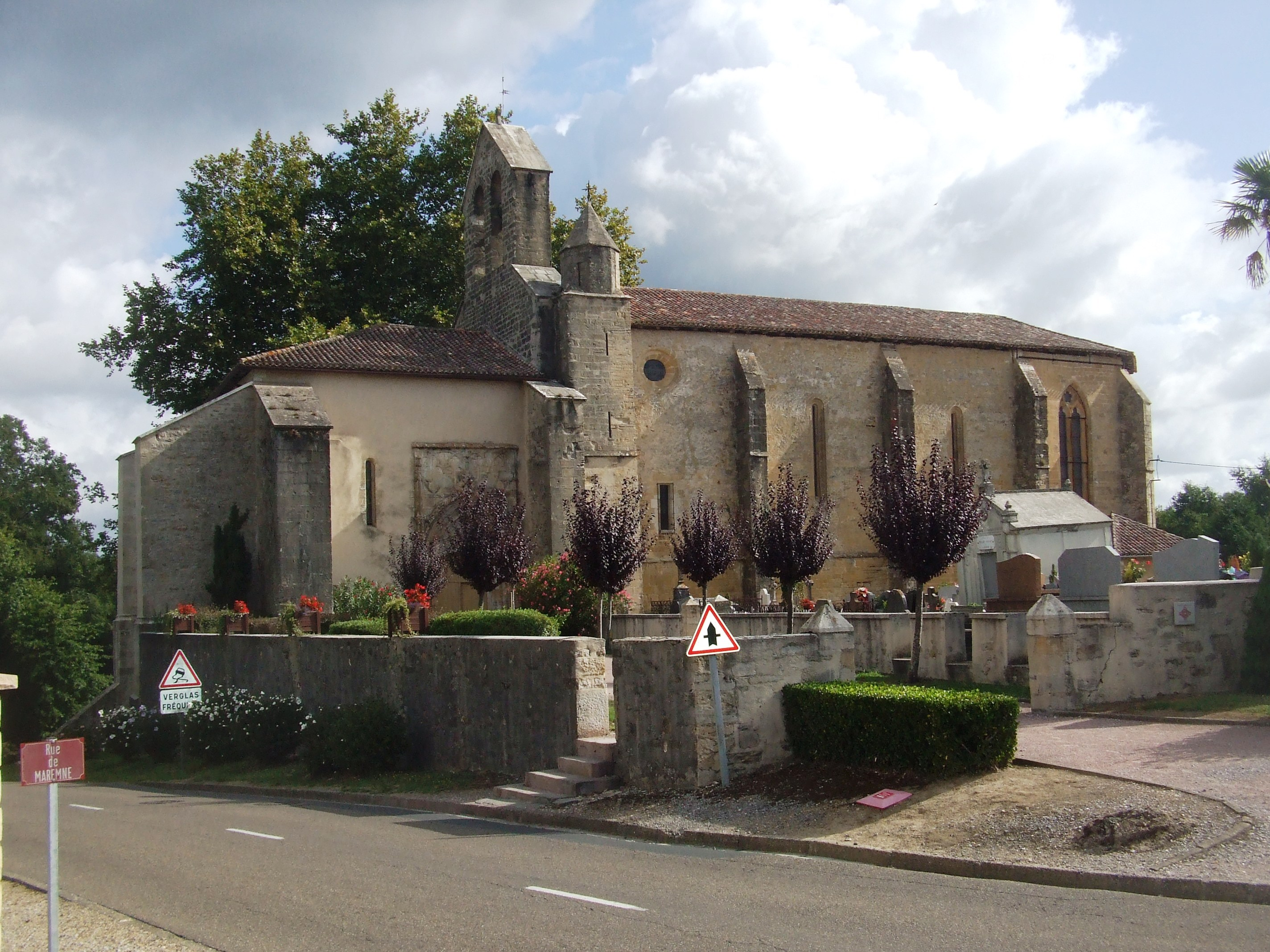

- Coat of arms
- Location of Saint-Martin-de-Hinx
- Location within France Location within Nouvelle-Aquitaine
- Coordinates: 43°34′57″N 1°16′10″W
- Country: France
- Region: Nouvelle-Aquitaine
- Department: Landes
- Arrondissement: Dax
- Canton: Pays Tyrossais
- Intercommunality: Maremne-Adour-Côte-Sud

Government
  - Mayor (2020–2026): Alexandre Lapègue
- Area^{1}: 25.48 km^{2} (9.84 sq mi)
- Elevation: 30 m (98 ft)
- Highest elevation: 106 m (348 ft)
- Lowest elevation: 1 m (3.3 ft)
- Population (2023): 1,808
  - Density: 70.96/km^{2} (183.8/sq mi)
- Time zone: UTC+01:00 (CET)
  - Summer (DST): UTC+02:00 (CEST)
- INSEE/Postal code: 40272 /40390
- ^{1} French Land Register data, which excludes lakes, ponds, glaciers > 1 km^{2} (0.386 sq mi or 247 acres) and river estuaries.

Saint-Martin-de-Hinx (French pronunciation: [sɛ̃ maʁtɛ̃ də ɛ̃ks]; Gascon: Sent Martin de Hins) is a commune in the Landes department in Nouvelle-Aquitaine in southwestern France.

== Population ==
Historical population
Year	Pop.	±% p.a.
1968	786	—
1975	715	−1.34%
1982	748	+0.65%
1990	837	+1.42%
1999	938	+1.27%
2007	1,129	+2.34%
2012	1,340	+3.49%
2017	1,480	+2.01%
2023	1,808	+3.39%
Source: INSEE

== See also ==
- Communes of the Landes department
