= Saint-Vincent-de-Tyrosse =

- Commune
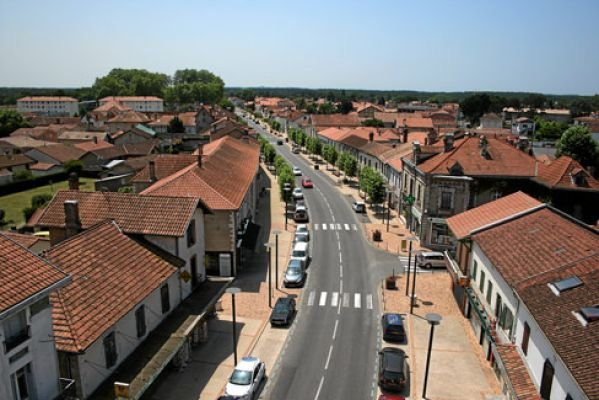

- Flag
- Location of Saint-Vincent-de-Tyrosse
- Location within France Location within Nouvelle-Aquitaine
- Coordinates: 43°39′38″N 1°18′26″W
- Country: France
- Region: Nouvelle-Aquitaine
- Department: Landes
- Arrondissement: Dax
- Canton: Pays Tyrossais
- Intercommunality: Maremne-Adour-Côte-Sud

Government
  - Mayor (2020–2026): Régis Gelez
- Area^{1}: 20.98 km^{2} (8.10 sq mi)
- Elevation: 23 m (75 ft)
- Highest elevation: 61 m (200 ft)
- Lowest elevation: 7 m (23 ft)
- Population (2023): 8,014
  - Density: 382.0/km^{2} (989.3/sq mi)
- Time zone: UTC+01:00 (CET)
  - Summer (DST): UTC+02:00 (CEST)
- INSEE/Postal code: 40284 /40230
- ^{1} French Land Register data, which excludes lakes, ponds, glaciers > 1 km^{2} (0.386 sq mi or 247 acres) and river estuaries.

Saint-Vincent-de-Tyrosse (French pronunciation: [sɛ̃ vɛ̃sɑ̃ də tiʁɔs]; Gascon: Sent Vincenç de Tiròssa) is a commune in the Landes department in Nouvelle-Aquitaine in southwestern France.

== Population ==
Historical population

Year	Pop.	±% p.a.
1793	519	—
1800	556	+0.99%
1806	558	+0.06%
1821	1,211	+5.30%
1831	652	−6.00%
1836	673	+0.64%
1841	754	+2.30%
1846	871	+2.93%
1851	900	+0.66%
1856	1,083	+3.77%
1861	1,071	−0.22%
1866	1,192	+2.16%
1872	1,215	+0.32%
1876	1,265	+1.01%
1881	1,316	+0.79%
1886	1,455	+2.03%
1891	1,562	+1.43%
1896	1,554	−0.10%
1901	1,570	+0.21%

Year	Pop.	±% p.a.
1906	1,761	+2.32%
1911	1,823	+0.69%
1921	1,747	−0.42%
1926	1,902	+1.71%
1931	2,016	+1.17%
1936	2,130	+1.11%
1946	2,242	+0.51%
1954	2,431	+1.02%
1962	2,945	+2.43%
1968	3,249	+1.65%
1975	4,063	+3.25%
1982	4,474	+1.39%
1990	5,075	+1.59%
1999	5,360	+0.61%
2007	6,936	+3.27%
2012	7,817	+2.42%
2017	7,593	−0.58%
2023	8,014	+0.90%

Source: EHESS and INSEE (1968-2023)

== See also ==
- Communes of the Landes department
