= Bénesse-Maremne =

- Commune
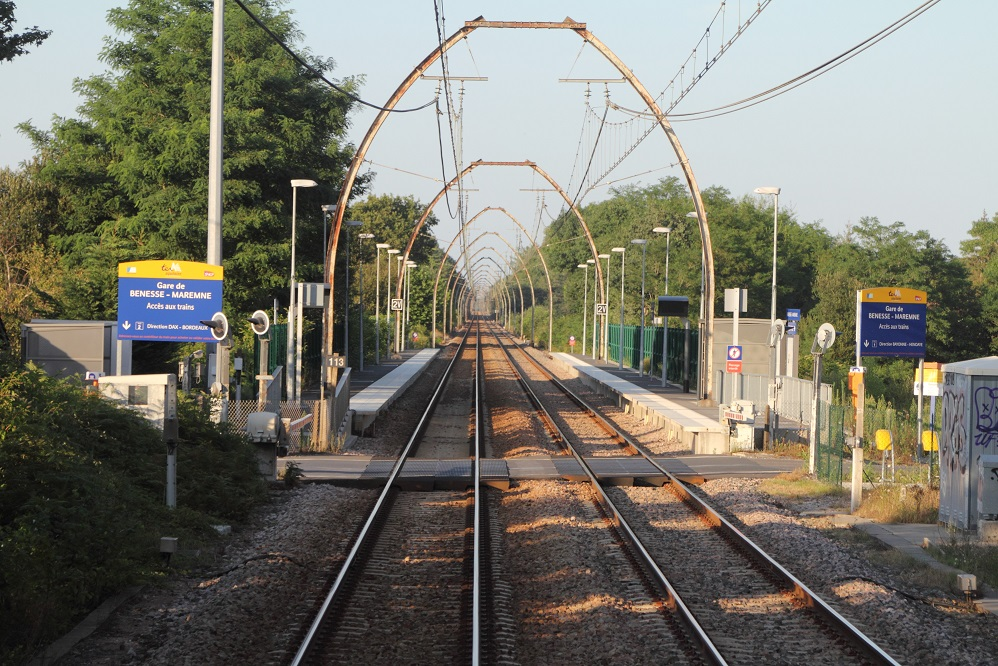
- The railway station
- Location of Bénesse-Maremne
- Location within France Location within Nouvelle-Aquitaine
- Coordinates: 43°38′06″N 1°21′31″W
- Country: France
- Region: Nouvelle-Aquitaine
- Department: Landes
- Arrondissement: Dax
- Canton: Pays Tyrossais
- Intercommunality: Maremne-Adour-Côte-Sud

Government
  - Mayor (2020–2026): Jean-François Monet
- Area^{1}: 18.69 km^{2} (7.22 sq mi)
- Elevation: 17 m (56 ft)
- Highest elevation: 25 m (82 ft)
- Lowest elevation: 1 m (3.3 ft)
- Population (2023): 3,780
  - Density: 202/km^{2} (524/sq mi)
- Time zone: UTC+01:00 (CET)
  - Summer (DST): UTC+02:00 (CEST)
- INSEE/Postal code: 40036 /40230
- ^{1} French Land Register data, which excludes lakes, ponds, glaciers > 1 km^{2} (0.386 sq mi or 247 acres) and river estuaries.

Bénesse-Maremne (French pronunciation: [benɛs maʁɛn]; Occitan: Benessa de Maremne) is a commune in the Landes department in Nouvelle-Aquitaine in southwestern France.

== Population ==
Historical population
Year	Pop.	±% p.a.
1968	1,089	—
1975	1,070	−0.25%
1982	1,175	+1.35%
1990	1,471	+2.85%
1999	1,752	+1.96%
2007	2,078	+2.16%
2012	2,498	+3.75%
2017	3,234	+5.30%
2023	3,780	+2.63%
Source: INSEE

== See also ==
- Communes of the Landes department
