= Canton of Pays Tyrossais =

Coordinates: 43.66°N 1.30°W

The canton of Pays Tyrossais is an administrative division of the Landes department, southwestern France. It was created at the French canton reorganisation which came into effect in March 2015. Its seat is in Saint-Vincent-de-Tyrosse.

It consists of the following communes:

1. Bénesse-Maremne
2. Capbreton
3. Josse
4. Labenne
5. Orx
6. Sainte-Marie-de-Gosse
7. Saint-Jean-de-Marsacq
8. Saint-Martin-de-Hinx
9. Saint-Vincent-de-Tyrosse
10. Saubion
11. Saubrigues
