= Josse, Landes =

Josse
- Commune
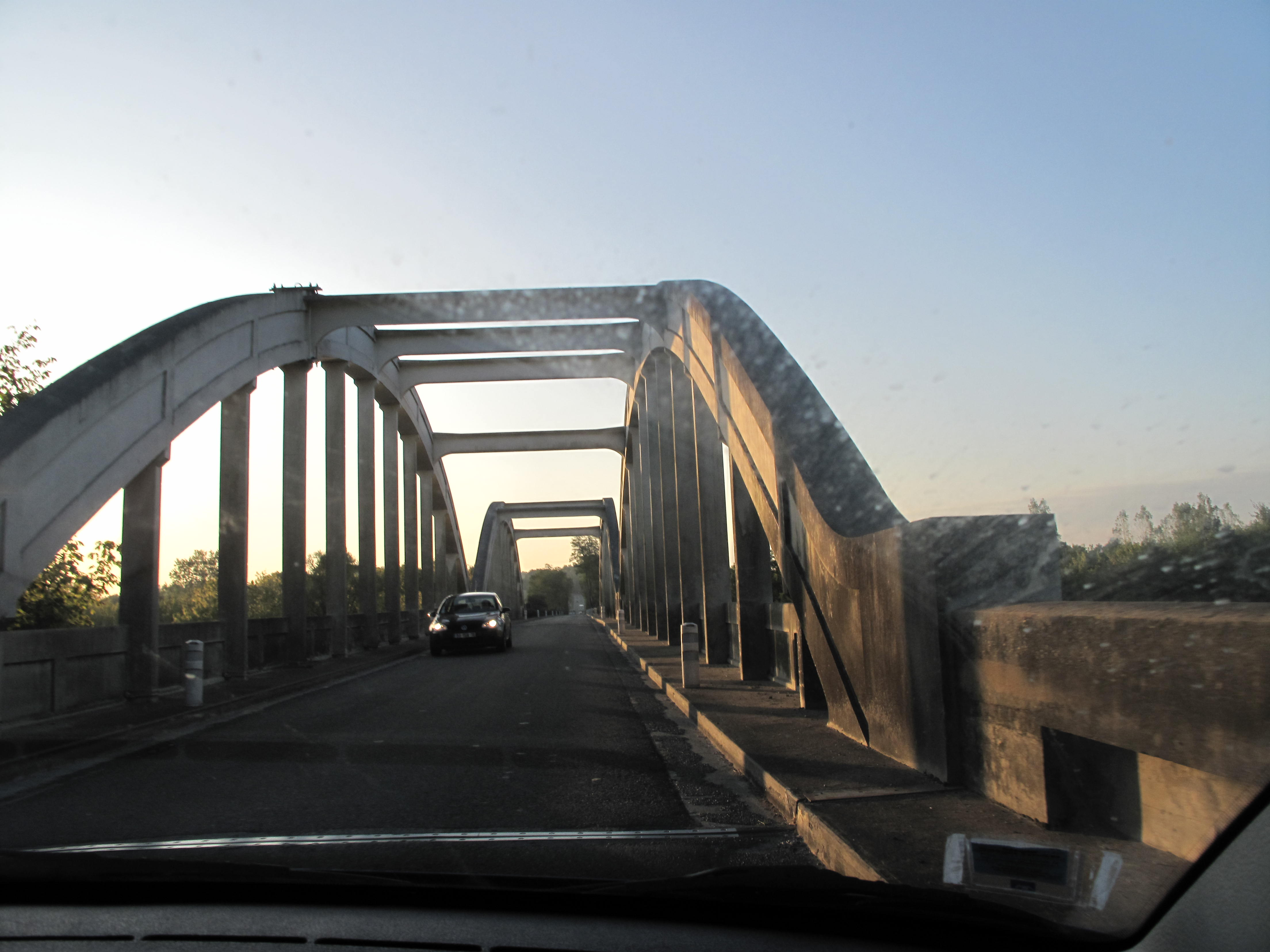
- The Pont de la Marqueze
- Location of Josse
- Location within France Location within Nouvelle-Aquitaine
- Coordinates: 43°38′32″N 1°13′23″W
- Country: France
- Region: Nouvelle-Aquitaine
- Department: Landes
- Arrondissement: Dax
- Canton: Pays Tyrossais
- Intercommunality: Maremne-Adour-Côte-Sud

Government
  - Mayor (2020–2026): Patrick Benoist
- Area^{1}: 9.48 km^{2} (3.66 sq mi)
- Elevation: 4 m (13 ft)
- Highest elevation: 36 m (118 ft)
- Lowest elevation: 2 m (6.6 ft)
- Population (2023): 1,018
  - Density: 107/km^{2} (278/sq mi)
- Time zone: UTC+01:00 (CET)
  - Summer (DST): UTC+02:00 (CEST)
- INSEE/Postal code: 40129 /40230
- ^{1} French Land Register data, which excludes lakes, ponds, glaciers > 1 km^{2} (0.386 sq mi or 247 acres) and river estuaries.

Josse (French pronunciation: [ʒɔs]; Occitan: Jòssa) is a commune in the Landes department in Nouvelle-Aquitaine in southwestern France.

== Population ==
Historical population
Year	Pop.	±% p.a.
1968	347	—
1975	356	+0.37%
1982	454	+3.53%
1990	581	+3.13%
1999	729	+2.55%
2007	725	−0.07%
2012	854	+3.33%
2017	850	−0.09%
2023	1,018	+3.05%
Source: INSEE

== See also ==
- Communes of the Landes department
