= Saubrigues =

- Commune
- Location of Saubrigues
- Location within France Location within Nouvelle-Aquitaine
- Coordinates: 43°36′41″N 1°18′47″W
- Country: France
- Region: Nouvelle-Aquitaine
- Department: Landes
- Arrondissement: Dax
- Canton: Pays Tyrossais
- Intercommunality: Maremne-Adour-Côte-Sud

Government
  - Mayor (2020–2026): Benoît Darets
- Area^{1}: 21.44 km^{2} (8.28 sq mi)
- Elevation: 50 m (160 ft)
- Highest elevation: 85 m (279 ft)
- Lowest elevation: 2 m (6.6 ft)
- Population (2023): 1,659
  - Density: 77.38/km^{2} (200.4/sq mi)
- Time zone: UTC+01:00 (CET)
  - Summer (DST): UTC+02:00 (CEST)
- INSEE/Postal code: 40292 /40230
- ^{1} French Land Register data, which excludes lakes, ponds, glaciers > 1 km^{2} (0.386 sq mi or 247 acres) and river estuaries.

Saubrigues (French pronunciation: [sobʁiɡ]; Occitan: Saubrigas) is a commune in the Landes department in Nouvelle-Aquitaine in southwestern France.

== Population ==
Historical population
Year	Pop.	±% p.a.
1968	757	—
1975	687	−1.38%
1982	764	+1.53%
1990	887	+1.88%
1999	1,076	+2.17%
2007	1,256	+1.95%
2012	1,385	+1.97%
2017	1,415	+0.43%
2023	1,659	+2.69%
Source: INSEE

== Transportation ==
The closest airport to Saubrigues is Biarritz Airport (23 km).

== See also ==
- Communes of the Landes department
