= Orx =

- Commune
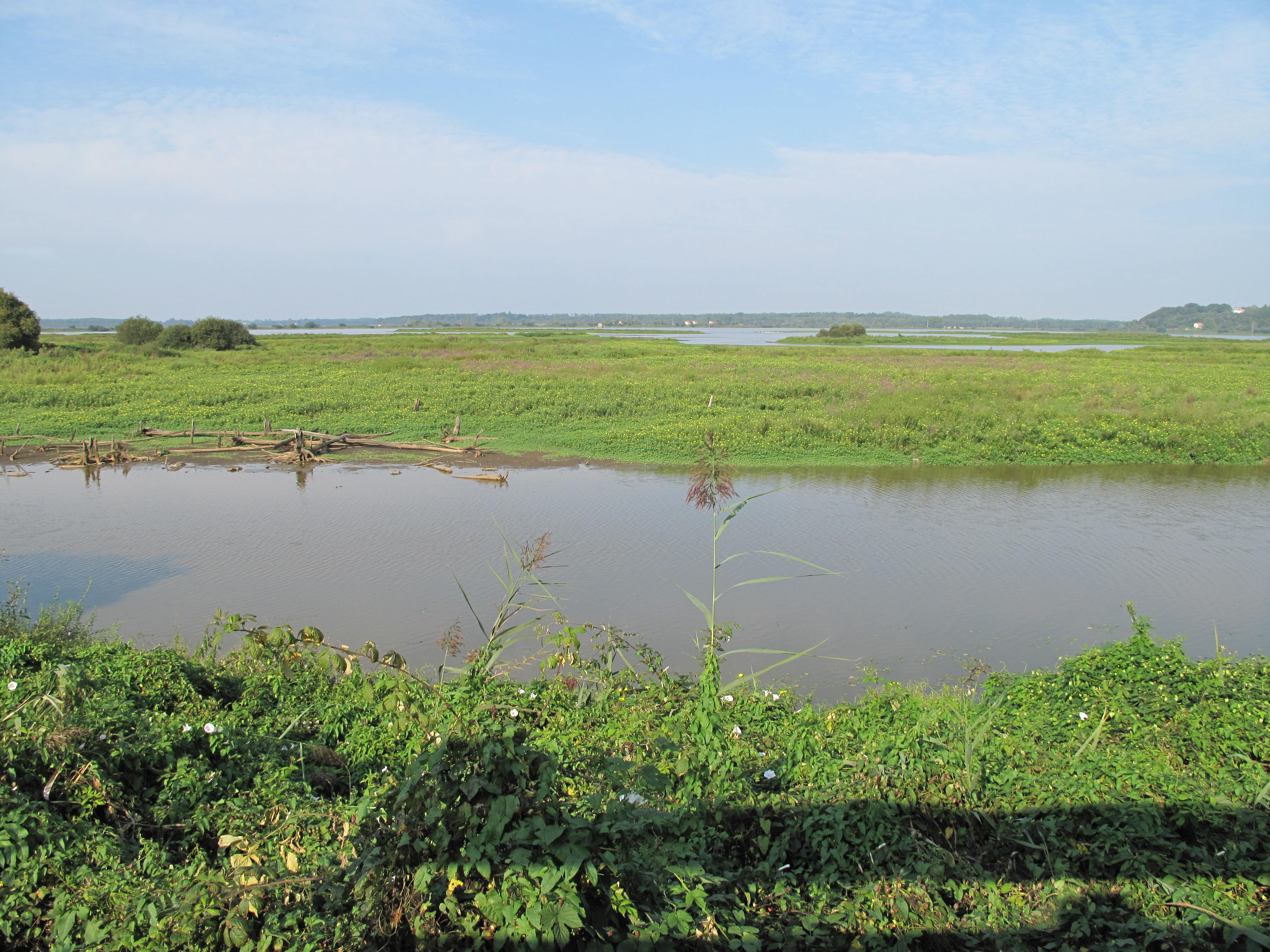
- Orx Marsh nature reserve
- Location of Orx
- Location within France Location within Nouvelle-Aquitaine
- Coordinates: 43°36′14″N 1°22′09″W
- Country: France
- Region: Nouvelle-Aquitaine
- Department: Landes
- Arrondissement: Dax
- Canton: Pays Tyrossais
- Intercommunality: Maremne-Adour-Côte-Sud

Government
  - Mayor (2020–2026): Bertrand Desclaux
- Area^{1}: 11.89 km^{2} (4.59 sq mi)
- Elevation: 22 m (72 ft)
- Highest elevation: 31 m (102 ft)
- Lowest elevation: 3 m (9.8 ft)
- Population (2023): 647
  - Density: 54.4/km^{2} (141/sq mi)
- Time zone: UTC+01:00 (CET)
  - Summer (DST): UTC+02:00 (CEST)
- INSEE/Postal code: 40213 /40230
- ^{1} French Land Register data, which excludes lakes, ponds, glaciers > 1 km^{2} (0.386 sq mi or 247 acres) and river estuaries.

Orx (French pronunciation: [ɔʁks]; Occitan: Òrcs) is a commune in the Landes department in Nouvelle-Aquitaine in southwestern France.

== Population ==
Historical population
Year	Pop.	±% p.a.
1968	347	—
1975	320	−1.15%
1982	342	+0.95%
1990	370	+0.99%
1999	422	+1.47%
2007	447	+0.72%
2012	566	+4.83%
2017	624	+1.97%
2023	647	+0.61%
Source: INSEE

== See also ==
- Communes of the Landes department
