= Capbreton =

- Commune
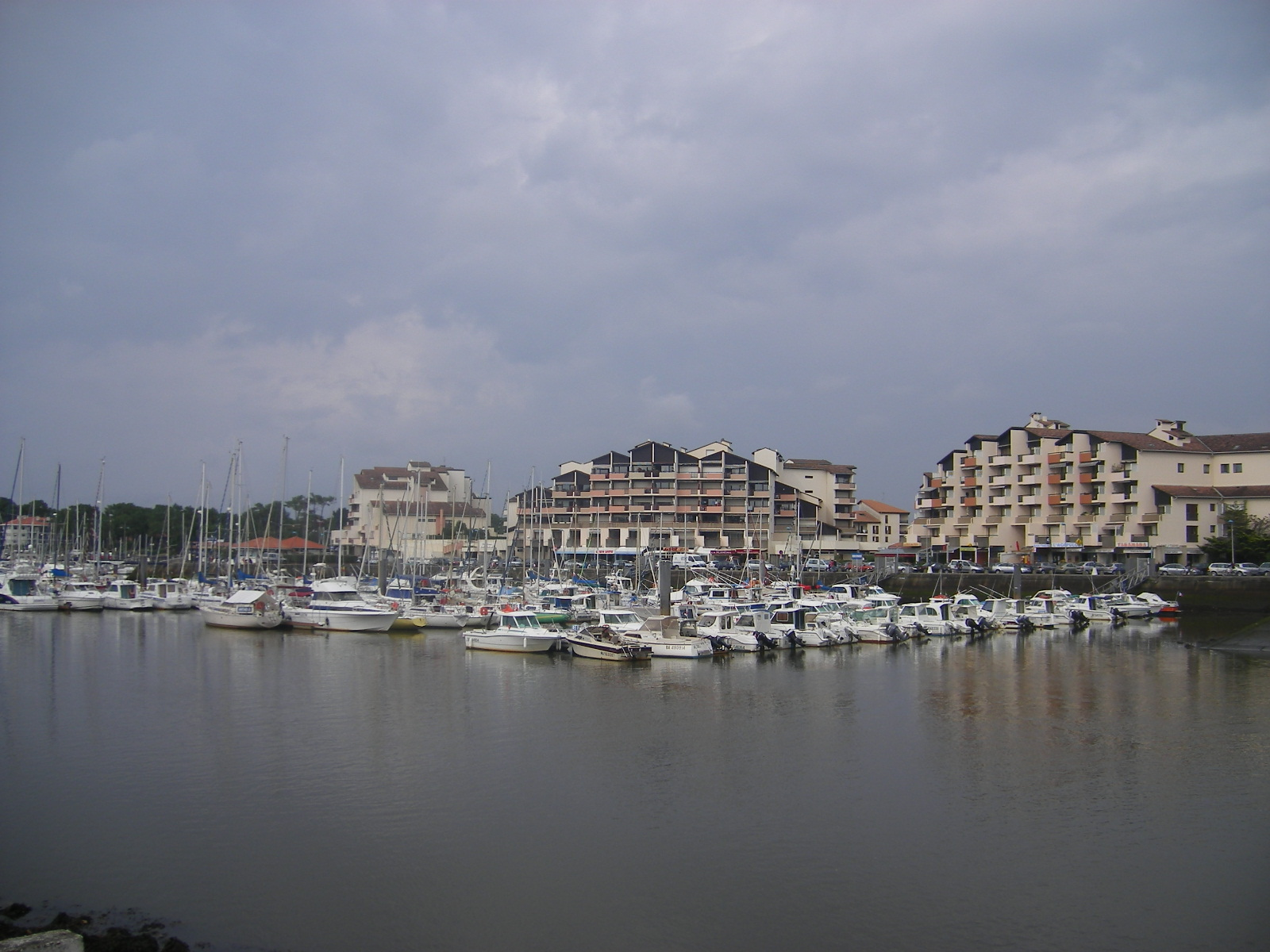
- Marina

- Coat of arms
- Location of Capbreton
- Location within France Location within Nouvelle-Aquitaine
- Coordinates: 43°38′35″N 1°25′52″W
- Country: France
- Region: Nouvelle-Aquitaine
- Department: Landes
- Arrondissement: Dax
- Canton: Pays Tyrossais
- Intercommunality: Maremne-Adour-Côte-Sud

Government
  - Mayor (2024–2026): Louis Galdos
- Area^{1}: 21.75 km^{2} (8.40 sq mi)
- Elevation: 10 m (33 ft)
- Highest elevation: 51 m (167 ft)
- Lowest elevation: 0 m (0 ft)
- Population (2023): 9,184
  - Density: 422.3/km^{2} (1,094/sq mi)
- Time zone: UTC+01:00 (CET)
  - Summer (DST): UTC+02:00 (CEST)
- INSEE/Postal code: 40065 /40130
- ^{1} French Land Register data, which excludes lakes, ponds, glaciers > 1 km^{2} (0.386 sq mi or 247 acres) and river estuaries.

Capbreton (French pronunciation: [kabʁətɔ̃]; Occitan: Capberton) is a commune in the Landes department in Nouvelle-Aquitaine in southwestern France. Located at the mouth of the Boudigau and Bourret rivers, the town is situated about 40 km north of Biarritz.

The town is a popular holiday destination for sailors, surfers, and beach-goers.

== Population ==
Historical population

Year	Pop.	±% p.a.
1793	537	—
1800	625	+2.19%
1806	586	−1.07%
1821	706	+1.25%
1831	915	+2.63%
1836	933	+0.39%
1841	968	+0.74%
1846	1,037	+1.39%
1851	1,060	+0.44%
1856	1,131	+1.31%
1861	1,180	+0.85%
1866	1,307	+2.07%
1872	1,247	−0.78%
1876	1,170	−1.58%
1881	1,151	−0.33%
1886	1,165	+0.24%
1891	1,284	+1.96%
1896	1,279	−0.08%
1901	1,313	+0.53%

Year	Pop.	±% p.a.
1906	1,407	+1.39%
1911	1,518	+1.53%
1921	1,565	+0.31%
1926	2,042	+5.46%
1931	2,954	+7.66%
1936	2,767	−1.30%
1946	3,126	+1.23%
1954	3,534	+1.55%
1962	3,688	+0.53%
1968	3,937	+1.09%
1975	4,263	+1.14%
1982	4,456	+0.63%
1990	5,089	+1.67%
1999	6,659	+3.03%
2007	7,652	+1.75%
2012	8,238	+1.49%
2017	8,769	+1.26%
2023	9,184	+0.77%

Source: EHESS and INSEE (1968-2023)

== Twinning ==
- Nazaré, Portugal

== Climate ==
Climate data for Capbreton-Soorts-Hossegor (1991–2020 normals, extremes 1974–present)
Month	Jan	Feb	Mar	Apr	May	Jun	Jul	Aug	Sep	Oct	Nov	Dec	Year
Record high °C (°F)	25.0 (77.0)	29.0 (84.2)	30.8 (87.4)	34.0 (93.2)	36.5 (97.7)	42.4 (108.3)	41.3 (106.3)	41.5 (106.7)	39.0 (102.2)	35.8 (96.4)	29.0 (84.2)	24.2 (75.6)	42.4 (108.3)
Mean daily maximum °C (°F)	12.4 (54.3)	13.7 (56.7)	16.6 (61.9)	18.7 (65.7)	21.9 (71.4)	24.6 (76.3)	26.5 (79.7)	27.3 (81.1)	25.2 (77.4)	21.3 (70.3)	15.8 (60.4)	12.9 (55.2)	19.7 (67.5)
Daily mean °C (°F)	8.2 (46.8)	8.8 (47.8)	11.4 (52.5)	13.6 (56.5)	16.9 (62.4)	19.8 (67.6)	21.8 (71.2)	22.2 (72.0)	19.6 (67.3)	16.2 (61.2)	11.5 (52.7)	8.9 (48.0)	14.9 (58.8)
Mean daily minimum °C (°F)	4.0 (39.2)	3.9 (39.0)	6.2 (43.2)	8.5 (47.3)	11.9 (53.4)	15.0 (59.0)	17.1 (62.8)	17.0 (62.6)	14.1 (57.4)	11.2 (52.2)	7.2 (45.0)	4.8 (40.6)	10.1 (50.2)
Record low °C (°F)	−13.3 (8.1)	−12.9 (8.8)	−8.0 (17.6)	−2.7 (27.1)	1.0 (33.8)	5.1 (41.2)	7.5 (45.5)	8.3 (46.9)	3.8 (38.8)	−0.9 (30.4)	−6.6 (20.1)	−10.2 (13.6)	−13.3 (8.1)
Average precipitation mm (inches)	120.5 (4.74)	91.1 (3.59)	83.8 (3.30)	94.5 (3.72)	85.8 (3.38)	76.2 (3.00)	60.2 (2.37)	64.9 (2.56)	97.0 (3.82)	114.6 (4.51)	169.9 (6.69)	123.3 (4.85)	1,181.8 (46.53)
Average precipitation days (≥ 1.0 mm)	13.7	11.5	11.4	12.6	10.9	8.8	7.1	7.4	9.8	11.7	14.2	13.3	132.4
Source: Meteociel

== See also ==
- Communes of the Landes department
