= Saint Mary Parish =

Saint Mary Parish or Saint Mary's Parish may refer to:

== Administrative parishes ==
- Saint Mary Parish, Antigua and Barbuda
- Sainte-Marie Parish, New Brunswick, Canada, in Kent County
- Saint Marys Parish, New Brunswick, Canada, in York County
- Saint Mary Parish, Jamaica
- St. Mary Parish, Louisiana, United States

== Ecclesiastic parishes ==
- Saint Mary's Parish (Red Bluff, California), United States
- St. Mary Parish, Torrington, Connecticut, United States
- St. Mary Parish (Bridgeport, Connecticut), United States
- St. Mary Parish (Newington, Connecticut), United States
- St. Mary Parish, Ware, Massachusetts, United States
- St. Mary's Parish (Bridgeton, Missouri), United States
- St. Mary's Parish (Wharton, New Jersey), United States
- St. Mary's Parish (Appleton, Wisconsin), United States
- Parish of St. Mary's, a former parish named for St Mary's Church, Mary Street, Dublin, Ireland

== See also ==
- Saint Mary (disambiguation)
