= Sainte-Marie-de-Gosse =

- Commune
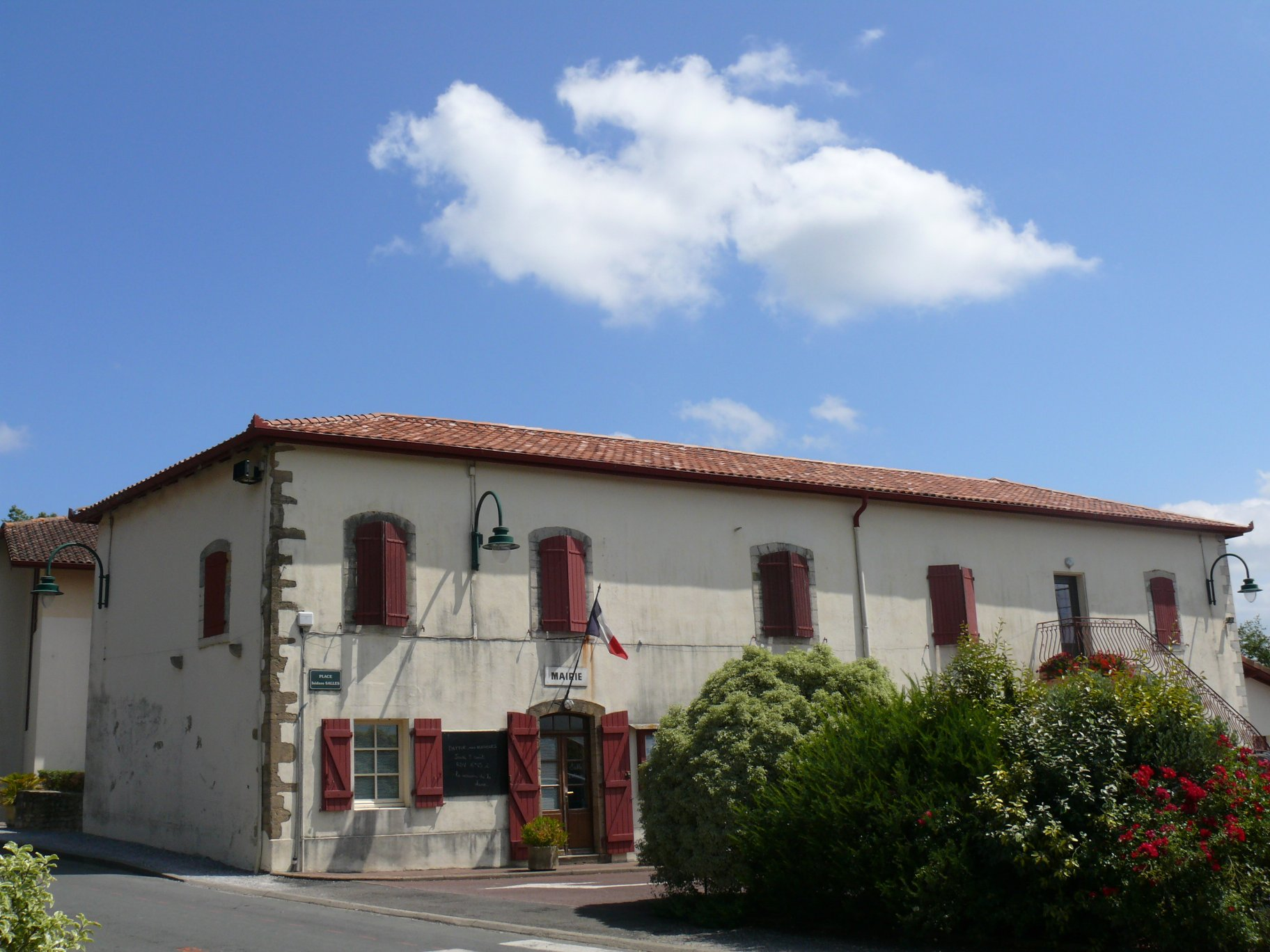
- Town hall

- Coat of arms
- Location of Sainte-Marie-de-Gosse
- Location within France Location within Nouvelle-Aquitaine
- Coordinates: 43°33′27″N 1°14′13″W
- Country: France
- Region: Nouvelle-Aquitaine
- Department: Landes
- Arrondissement: Dax
- Canton: Pays Tyrossais
- Intercommunality: Maremne-Adour-Côte-Sud

Government
  - Mayor (2020–2026): Francis Betbeder
- Area^{1}: 26.54 km^{2} (10.25 sq mi)
- Elevation: 136 m (446 ft)
- Highest elevation: 108 m (354 ft)
- Lowest elevation: 0 m (0 ft)
- Population (2023): 1,241
  - Density: 46.76/km^{2} (121.1/sq mi)
- Time zone: UTC+01:00 (CET)
  - Summer (DST): UTC+02:00 (CEST)
- INSEE/Postal code: 40271 /40390
- ^{1} French Land Register data, which excludes lakes, ponds, glaciers > 1 km^{2} (0.386 sq mi or 247 acres) and river estuaries.

Sainte-Marie-de-Gosse (French pronunciation: [sɛ̃t maʁi də ɡɔs]; Gascon: Senta Maria de Gòssa) is a commune in the Landes department in Nouvelle-Aquitaine in southwestern France.

== Population ==
Historical population
Year	Pop.	±% p.a.
1968	821	—
1975	765	−1.00%
1982	729	−0.69%
1990	815	+1.40%
1999	878	+0.83%
2007	1,036	+2.09%
2012	1,057	+0.40%
2017	1,184	+2.30%
2023	1,241	+0.79%
Source: INSEE

== See also ==
- Communes of the Landes department
