= Sainte-Marie =

Sainte-Marie or Ste. Marie (French for Saint Mary) may refer to the several places:

== In Metropolitan France ==
- Sainte-Marie, Ardennes
- Sainte-Marie, Cantal
- Sainte-Marie, Doubs
- Sainte-Marie, Gers
- Sainte-Marie, Ille-et-Vilaine
- Sainte-Marie, Hautes-Alpes
- Sainte-Marie, Hautes-Pyrénées
- Sainte-Marie, Nièvre
- Sainte-Marie, Pyrénées-Orientales
- Sainte-Marie-à-Py, Marne département
- Sainte-Marie-au-Bosc, Seine-Maritime département
- Sainte-Marie-aux-Chênes, Moselle département
- Sainte-Marie-aux-Mines, Haut-Rhin département
- Sainte-Marie-Cappel, Nord département
- Sainte-Marie-d'Alloix, Isère département
- Sainte-Marie-d'Alvey, Savoie département
- Sainte-Marie-de-Chignac, Dordogne département
- Sainte-Marie-de-Cuines, Savoie département
- Sainte-Marie-de-Gosse, Landes département
- Sainte-Marie-de-Ré, Charente-Maritime département
- Sainte-Marie-des-Champs, Seine-Maritime département
- Sainte-Marie-de-Vatimesnil, Eure département
- Sainte-Marie-de-Vaux, Haute-Vienne département
- Sainte-Marie-du-Bois, Manche
- Sainte-Marie-du-Bois, Mayenne
- Sainte-Marie-du-Lac-Nuisement, Marne département
- Sainte-Marie-du-Mont, Isère
- Sainte-Marie-du-Mont, Manche
- Sainte-Marie-en-Chanois, Haute-Saône département
- Sainte-Marie-en-Chaux, Haute-Saône département
- Sainte-Marie-Kerque, Pas-de-Calais département
- Sainte-Marie-la-Blanche, Côte-d'Or département
- Sainte-Marie-Lapanouze, Corrèze département
- Sainte-Marie-la-Robert, Orne département
- Sainte-Marie-Laumont, Calvados département
- Sainte-Marie-Outre-l'Eau, Calvados département
- Sainte-Marie-sur-Mer, a former commune of the Loire-Atlantique département
- Sainte-Marie-sur-Ouche, Côte-d'Or département

== In Canada ==
- Sainte-Marie-de-Kent, New Brunswick
- Sainte-Marie Parish, New Brunswick
- Sainte-Marie among the Hurons, a 17th-century French Jesuit mission located near modern Midland, Ontario
- Sainte-Marie, Quebec
- Sainte-Marie-de-Blandford, Quebec
- Sainte-Marie-Salomé, Quebec
- Sainte-Marie (provincial electoral district), a former Quebec provincial electoral district
- Sainte-Marie, Montreal, a neighbourhood and district of Montreal
- Sainte-Marie–Saint-Jacques, a Quebec provincial electoral district including the neighbourhood of Sainte-Marie
- Sainte-Marie Island (Richelieu River), an island of the Richelieu River in Carignan, Quebec
- Sainte-Marie River (Anticosti Island), a tributary of the Gulf of St. Lawrence in L'Île-d'Anticosti, Quebec, Canada

== In the United States ==
- Sainte Marie among the Iroquois, a 17th-century French Jesuit mission located on Onondaga Lake, New York
- Ste. Marie, Illinois, a village
- Ste. Marie Church (Manchester, New Hampshire), a Roman Catholic church in Manchester, New Hampshire

== Elsewhere ==
- Sainte-Marie, Martinique, a town and commune
- Île Sainte-Marie, a small island in the northeastern part of Madagascar
- Sainte-Marie, Réunion

== See also ==
- Saint Marie (disambiguation)
- Saint Mary (disambiguation)
- Sault Ste. Marie, Michigan
- Sault Ste. Marie, Ontario
