= SS Marie =

A number of steamships have been named Marie.

- SS Marie (1899), a German cargo ship in service 1899–1923
- SS Marie (1923), a Belgian cargo ship in service 1936–48
- SS Marie (1932), a Belgian cargo ship in service 1949–50
- SS Marie (1933), an American cargo ship in service 1940–41
