= Sancta Sanctorum (Lateran, Rome) =

Roman Catholic chapel in Italy

- Chiesa di San Lorenzo in Palatio ad Sancta Sanctorum
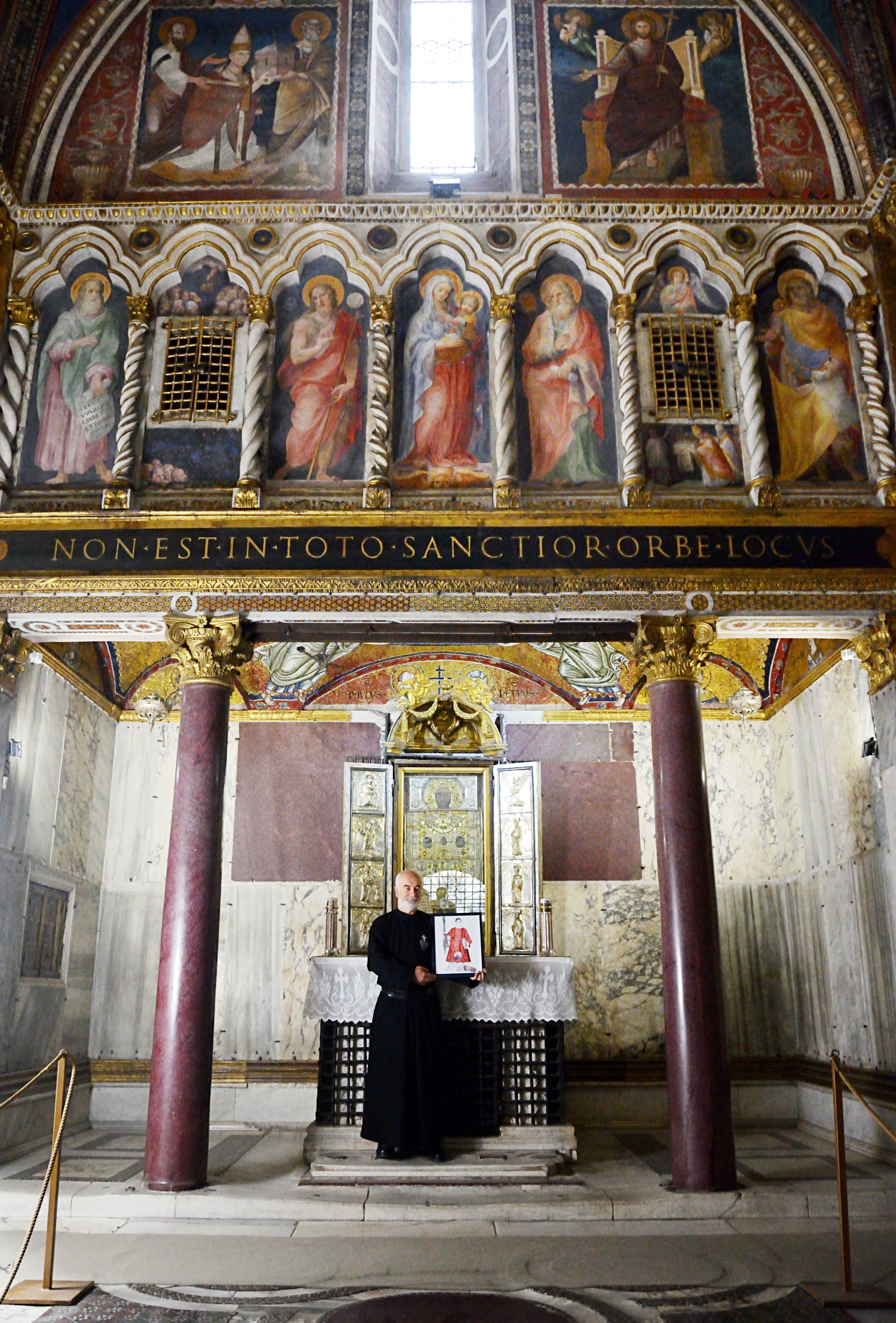
- Sancta Sanctorum, Lateran Palace with the rector of the Scala Santa
- Sancta Sanctorum
- 41°53′14″N 12°30′25″E
- Location: Lateran Palace, Rome
- Country: Italy
- Denomination: Roman Catholic

History
- Status: Chapel (former private papal oratory)
- Dedication: Saint Lawrence

Architecture
- Functional status: Active
- Style: Gothic interior with Cosmatesque decoration
- Completed: 8th century (documented under Pope Stephen III, 768–772); rebuilt/restored 1276–1280 (Pope Nicholas III)

Specifications
- Width: 2.73 × 5.85 m (apse)

Administration
- Diocese: Diocese of Rome

The Chiesa di San Lorenzo in Palatio ad Sancta Sanctorum (English: Church of St. Lawrence in the Palace of the Holy of Holies), known simply as the Sancta Sanctorum, is a Catholic chapel in Rome featuring the Scala Sancta (Holy Stairs) of the Lateran Palace. It was the original private chapel of the papacy before it moved to Avignon, and later to the Apostolic Palace. The chapel is the only building from the old Lateran Palace that was not destroyed during its reconstruction.

== Name ==
The chapel acquired the Sancta Sanctorum sometime in the ninth century. The spelling is Sancta, the neuter plural form of the Latin adjective "holy": this is a reference to the multiple relics preserved there (i.e. "the holy things") and to the Holy of Holies in Jerusalem, traditionally called in Latin both sanctum sanctorum (the singular form) or sancta sanctorum.

== History ==
The founder of the chapel is unknown. It was originally dedicated in honor of Saint Lawrence, and served as the Pope's private oratory until the Renaissance. It is located at the summit of the Scala Sancta, (Holy Stairs). The first mention of the chapel is found in the Liber Pontificalis, during the reign of Pope Stephen III (reigned from 768-72). The antiquarian Giovanni Marangoni and Onofrio Panvinio quote documents that cite the acquisition in 583 by Pope Gregory of relics from Constantinople, including an arm of St. Lawrence, that were housed in the church of St. Lawrence in the Lateran Palace.

It formed part of the Lateran Palace, headquarters of the public offices of the Roman Curia throughout the Middle Ages. Pope Gregory IV (reigned from 827-44) had a private apartment built near the chapel so that he could pray there. Later Pope Alexander III is mentioned as presiding here over the ceremony of the washing of the feet. It later became part of the Palace and Holy Steps complex commissioned by Pope Sixtus V in 1586.

== Artwork ==
The chapel is relatively small and rectangular, with a nave seven meters long and an apse nearly 6 meters wide. rectangular apse measuring 2.73 by 5.85 metres.

The main altar contains a cypress wood reliquary box, placed under the altar by Pope Leo III (Pope from 795 to 816). It supposedly houses the bones of at least 13 saints (whereof the chapel derives the name "holy of holies"). The reliquary box itself is taken to represent the Ark of the Covenant in Solomon's Temple.

Over the course of time, other relics were added, including the cloisonné enameled cross commissioned by Paschal I (Pope from 817 to 824).

The opus sectile floor dates from 1278. This style of intarsiated pavement was created in the 12th century by the Cosmati family of stonecutters and widely copied throughout Rome in the 13th century.

The chapel also houses the Uronica or Acheiropoieta Lateranese icon of Christ Pantocrator, known as the Veronica, that was supposedly begun by Saint Luke and finished as an acheiropoieta (which translates to "images not made by human hands") since finished by an angel. Other acheiropoieta include the image of Christ’s face that miraculously imprinted itself on the sudarium of Veronica.

== Gallery ==
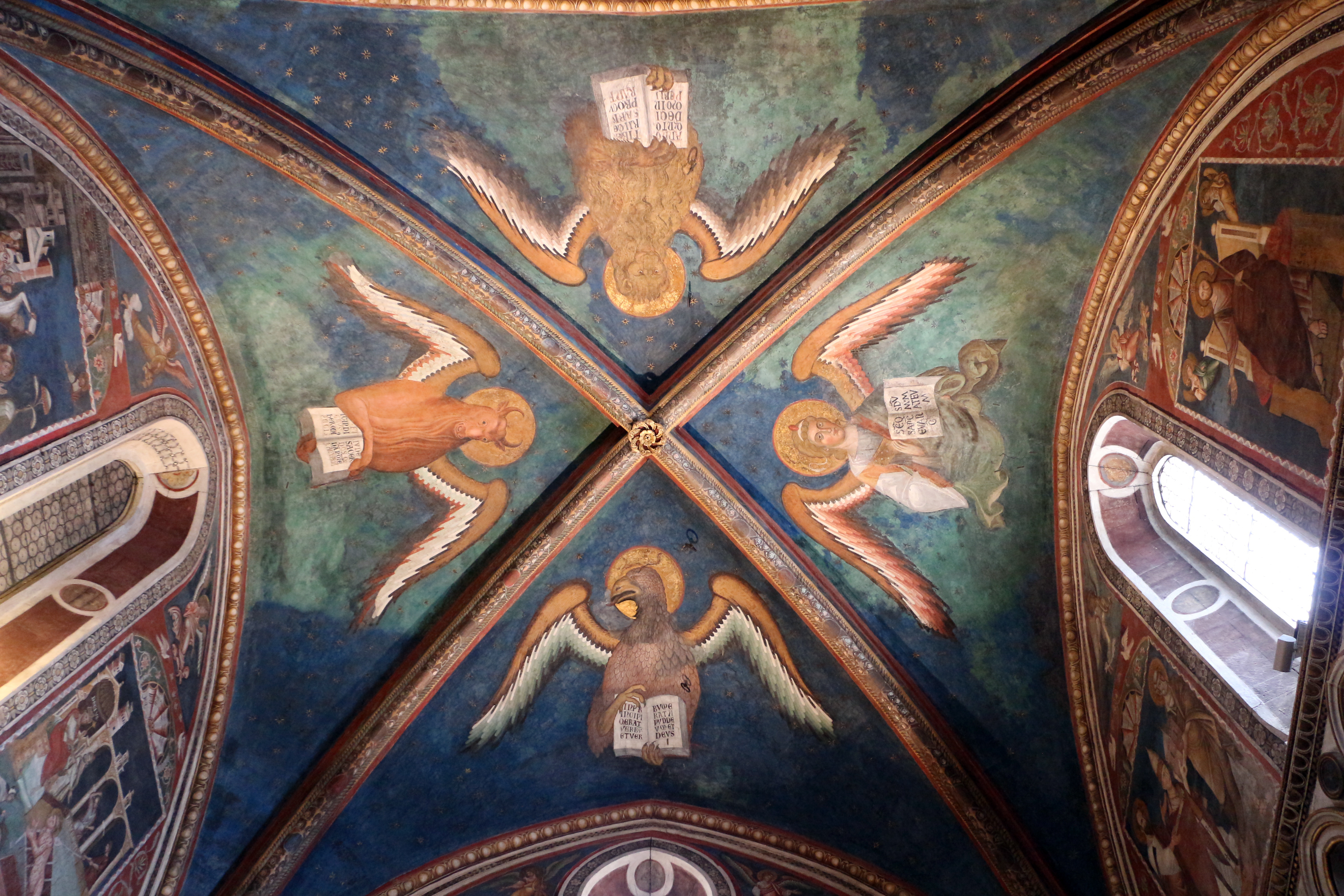

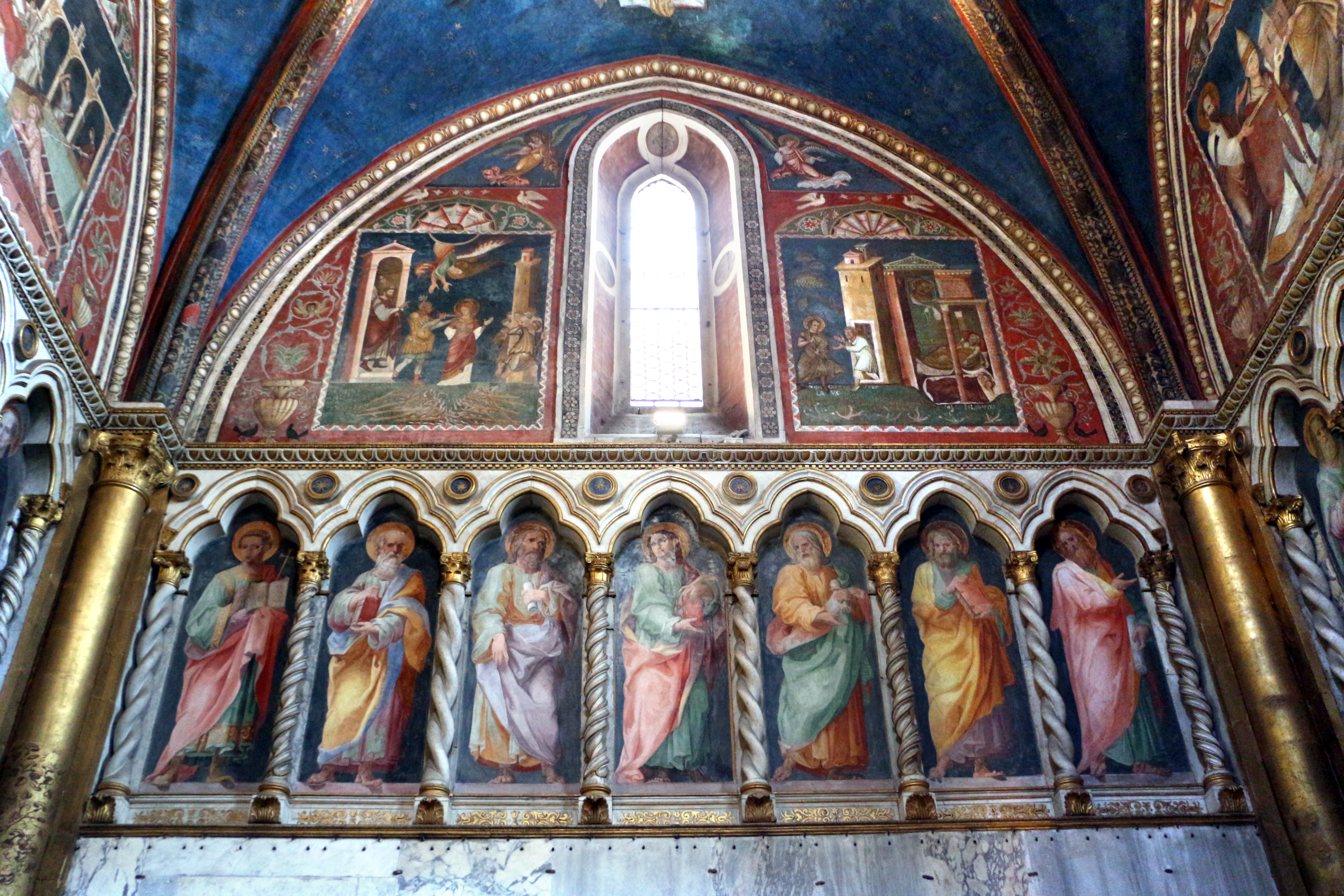

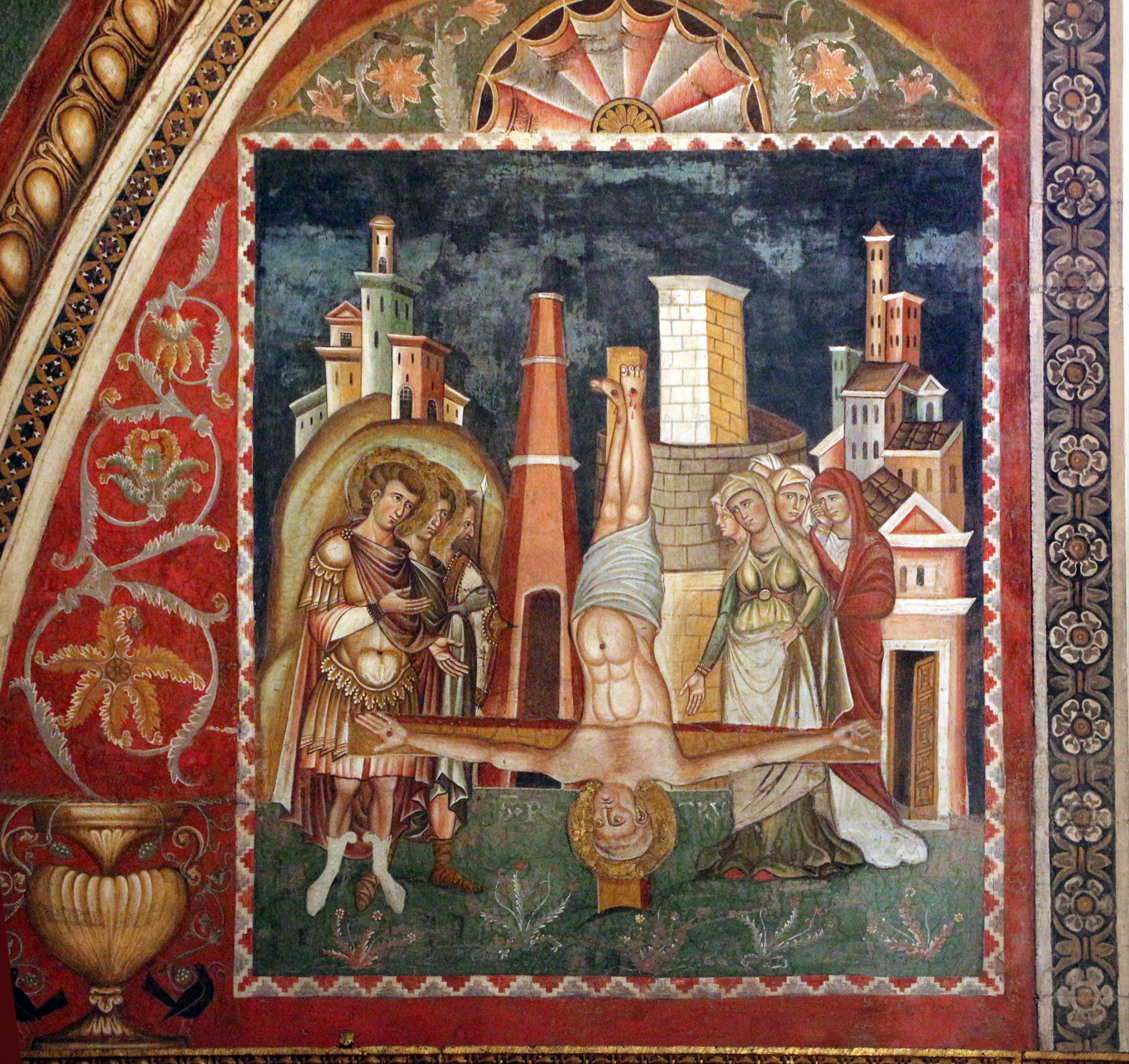

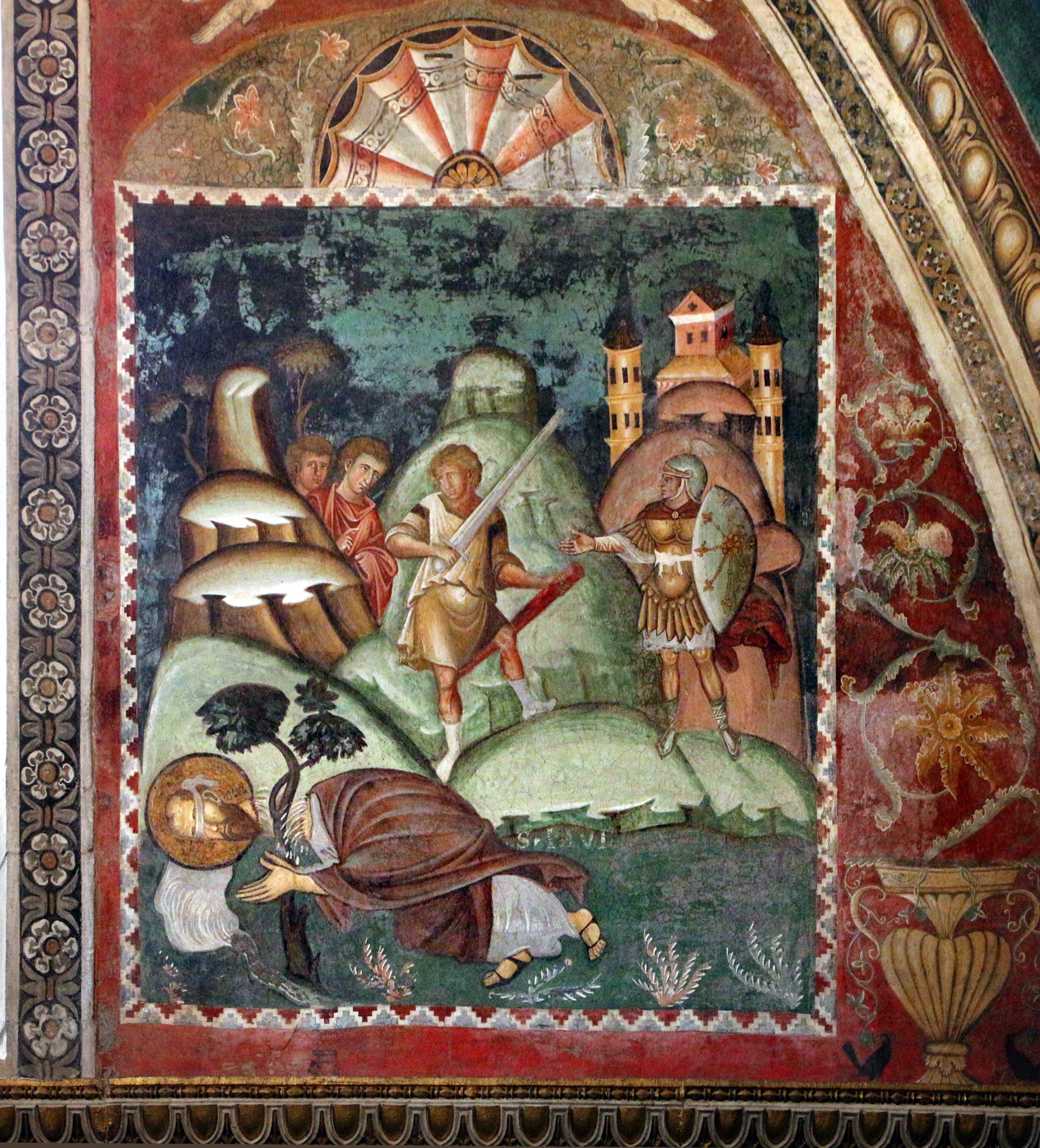

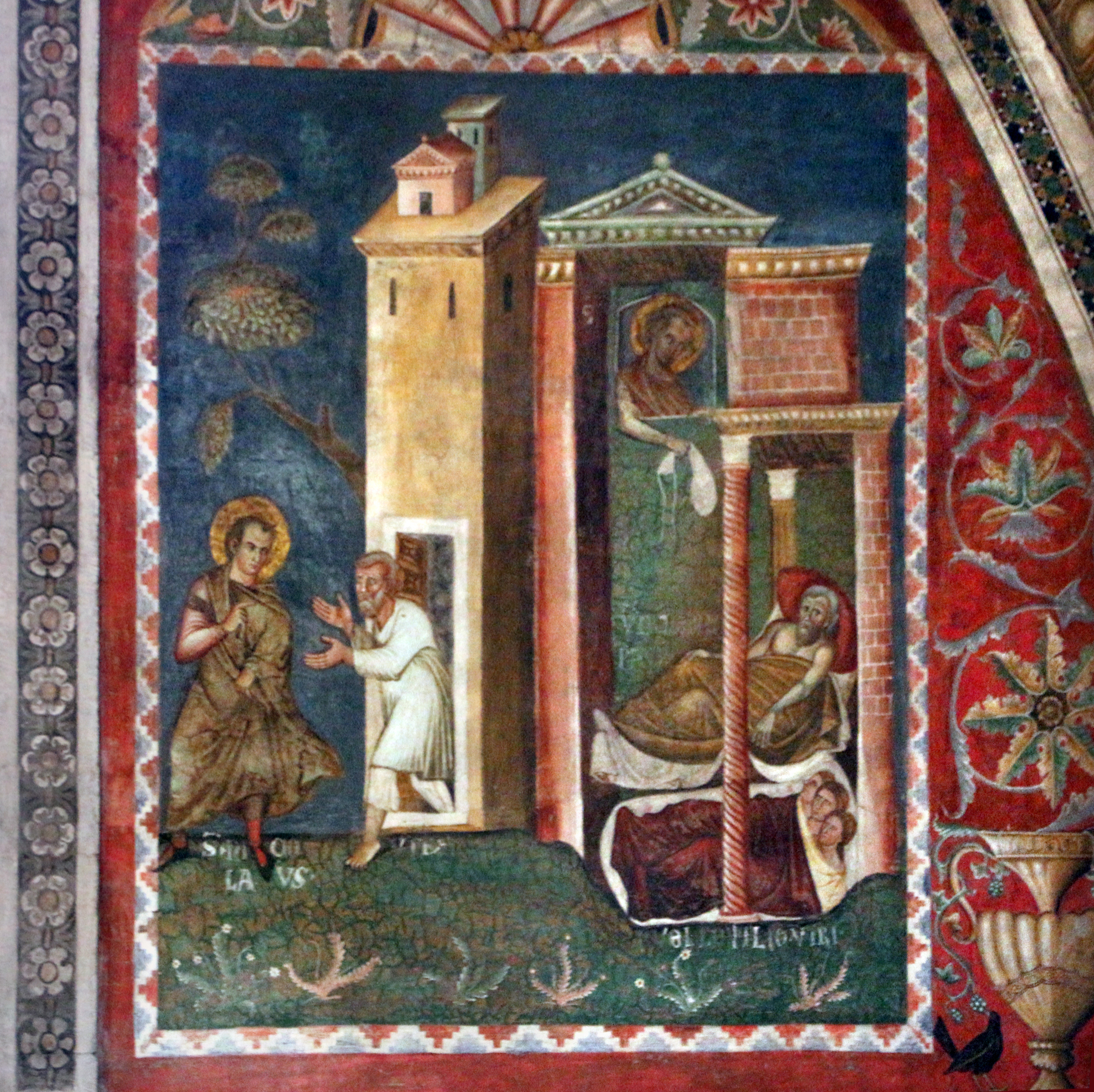

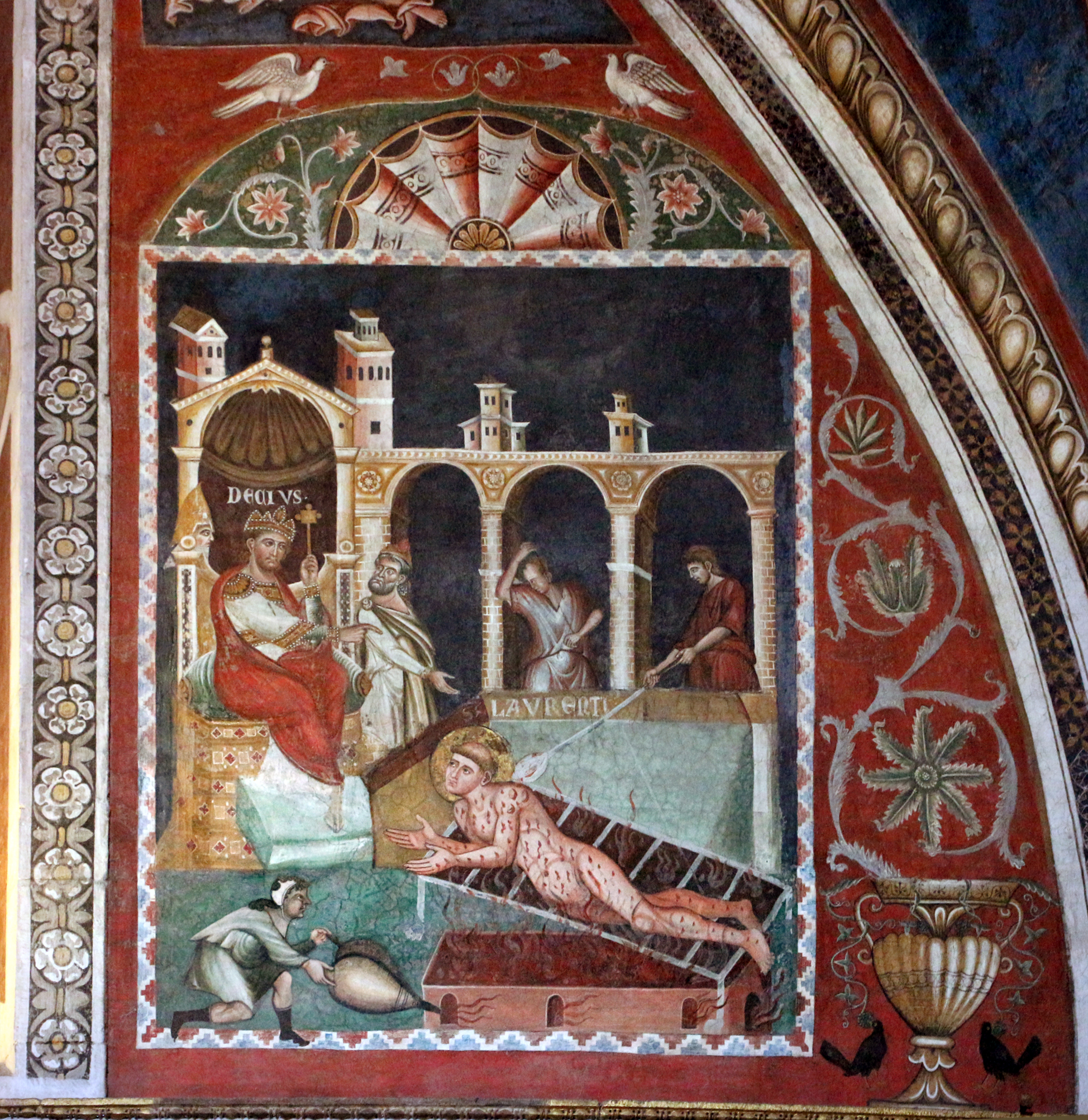

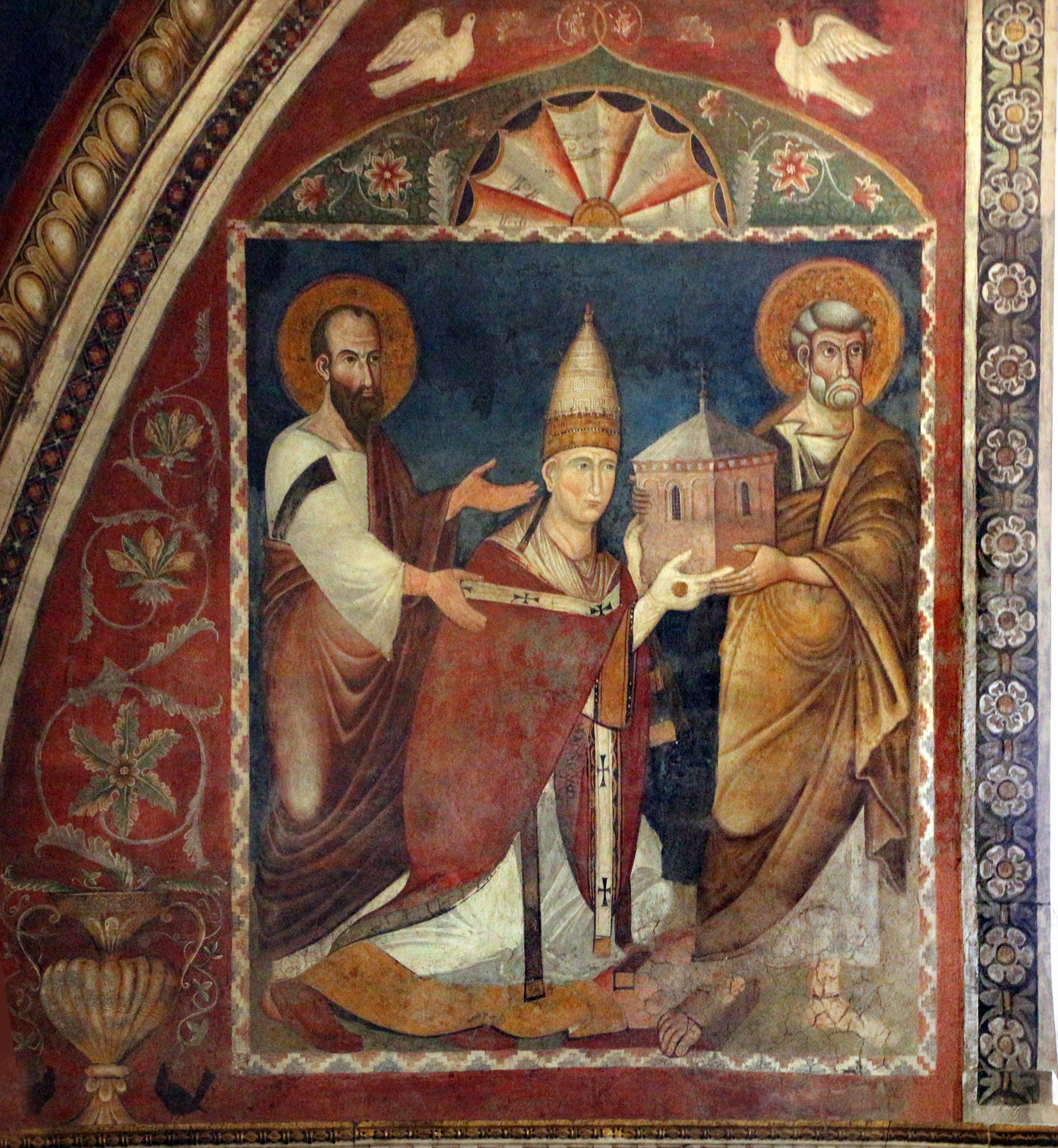
