= Saint Mary (disambiguation) =

Saint Mary is a term for Mary, mother of Jesus.

Saint Mary may also refer to:

== People ==
- Mary Magdalene, disciple of Jesus
- Mary of Bethany, disciple of Jesus and sister of Martha and Lazarus
- Salome (disciple), disciple of Jesus, counted as one of the Three Marys in Roman Catholic tradition
- Mary of Egypt (c. 344 – c. 421), Egyptian grazer and patron saint of penitents
- Marina the Monk (died 508), also known as Mary of Alexandria, Byzantine confessor and wonderworker

=== Roman Catholic ===
- Mary de Cervellione (c. 1230 – 1290), Catalan superior of the Third Order of Mercedarians
- Mary Frances of the Five Wounds (1715–1791), member of the Third Order of St. Francis
- Mary MacKillop or Mary of the Cross (1842–1909), first Roman Catholic saint from Australia
- Mariam Baouardy, or Mary of Jesus Crucified (1846–1878), Palestinian Carmelite nun and saint

=== Eastern Orthodox ===
- Maria Skobtsova, or Saint Mary of Paris (1891–1945), Russian Orthodox noblewoman, nun and martyr

== Places ==
=== Antigua and Barbuda ===
- Saint Mary, Antigua and Barbuda, parish in Antigua and Barbuda

=== Australia ===
- St Mary, Queensland, a locality in the Fraser Coast Region

=== France ===
- Saint-Mary, a commune in the Charente department

=== United Kingdom ===
- St Mary (Brecon electoral ward), Powys, Wales

=== United States ===
- St. Mary, Kentucky
- St. Mary, Missouri
- Saint Mary, Nebraska
- St. Mary Township, Waseca County, Minnesota
- St. Mary, Montana

=== Other ===
- Saint Mary, Jersey
- Saint Mary Parish (disambiguation)

== Other uses ==
- Saint Mary (film), a 2001 Iranian film

== See also ==
- Sancta Maria (disambiguation)
- Santa Maria (disambiguation)
- Saint Marie (disambiguation)
- Sainte-Marie (disambiguation)
- St. Mary's (disambiguation)
- Mount St. Mary's (disambiguation)
- Saint Mary Major (disambiguation)
