= St Marie =

St Marie may refer to:

== Places ==
- St. Marie, Wisconsin, a town in the United States
- St. Marie, Montana, a census-designated place in Valley County, United States
- Maaria (Swedish: S:t Marie), a former municipality in Finland
- Yli-Maaria (Swedish: Övre S:t Marie), a district of Turku named after the former municipality
- Île Sainte-Marie (Malagasy: Nosy Boraha), an island off the east coast of Madagascar
- Saint Marie (fictional island), in the Lesser Antilles which serves as the setting for the BBC crime drama television series Death in Paradise

== Other uses ==
- "St. Marie", 4th single from Stone Sour's 2017 album Hydrograd

== See also ==
- Saint Marie (disambiguation)
