= Labenne =

- Commune
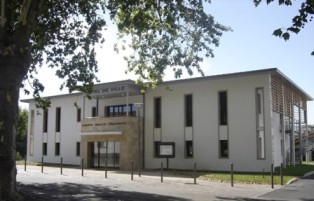
- The town hall in Labenne

- Coat of arms
- Location of Labenne
- Location within France Location within Nouvelle-Aquitaine
- Coordinates: 43°35′38″N 1°25′32″W
- Country: France
- Region: Nouvelle-Aquitaine
- Department: Landes
- Arrondissement: Dax
- Canton: Pays Tyrossais
- Intercommunality: Maremne-Adour-Côte-Sud

Government
  - Mayor (2025–2026): Stéphanie Chessoux
- Area^{1}: 24.48 km^{2} (9.45 sq mi)
- Elevation: 12 m (39 ft)
- Highest elevation: 52 m (171 ft)
- Lowest elevation: 2 m (6.6 ft)
- Population (2023): 7,183
  - Density: 293.4/km^{2} (760.0/sq mi)
- Time zone: UTC+01:00 (CET)
  - Summer (DST): UTC+02:00 (CEST)
- INSEE/Postal code: 40133 /40530
- ^{1} French Land Register data, which excludes lakes, ponds, glaciers > 1 km^{2} (0.386 sq mi or 247 acres) and river estuaries.

Labenne (French pronunciation: [labɛn]; Occitan: La Vena) is a commune in the Landes department in Nouvelle-Aquitaine in south-western France.

== Population ==
Historical population
Year	Pop.	±% p.a.
1968	1,422	—
1975	1,753	+3.03%
1982	2,120	+2.75%
1990	2,884	+3.92%
1999	3,345	+1.66%
2007	4,431	+3.58%
2012	5,105	+2.87%
2017	6,616	+5.32%
2023	7,183	+1.38%
Source: INSEE

== See also ==
- Communes of the Landes department
