= Giovanni Marangoni =

Italian Roman Catholic priest and antiquarian (1673–1753)

Giovanni Marangoni (6 August 1673 – 5 February 1753) was a Roman Catholic priest and antiquarian.

== Biography ==
He was born in Verona, and became a canon at the Cathedral of Anagni, and later an apostolic protonotary. He was named custodian of the Roman Catacombs.

== Works ==
- Delle memorie sacre e profane dell'anfiteatro di Roma, volgarmente detto il Colosseo (about the Roman Colosseum) (1746)
- Istoria dell'antichissimo oratorio, o Capella di San Lorenzo nel patriarchio lateranense, comunemente appellato Sancta Sanctorum, e della celebre immagine del SS. Salvatore detta Acheropita, che ivi conservasi (Stamperia San Michele, Rome, 1747).
- Il Divoto Pellegrino Guidato, ed Istruito nella Visita delle quattro Basiliche di Roma, per il Giubileo dell'Anno Santo 1750., Stamperia del Characas, presso San Marco al Corso, Rome, 1749.
- Grandezze dell'Arcangelo San Michele nella Chiesa Trionfante, Militante, e Purgante, esposte in Dieci Lezioni, ed altrettante Meditazioni, e Considerazioni. Stamperia di Giovanni Zempel, 1739.
- Delle Cose Gentilesche e Profane Trasportate Ad Uso, e Adornamento delle Chiese. Stamperia di Niccolò e Marco Pagliarini, 1744.
- Delle Memorie Sagre e Civili dell'Antica Citta di Novana, oggi Civitanova, nella Provincia del Piceno. Stamperia di Giovanni Zempel. 1743.
