= Saint Marie =

Saint Marie may refer to:

- Saint Marie (manhwa)
- Saint Marie (fictional island), the setting of BBC's Death in Paradise

== See also ==
- Mary (mother of Jesus)
- Sainte-Marie (disambiguation)
- Saint Mary (disambiguation)
- St Marie (disambiguation)
