= Cardinals created by Lucius III =

Catholic appointments from 1182 to 1185

Pope Lucius III created fifteen new cardinals.

== Conistories ==
=== 21 May 1182 ===
- Pedro de Cardona, archbishop-elect of Toledo – cardinal-priest of S. Lorenzo in Damaso, † 26 June 1182
- Hugo Etherianis – cardinal-deacon of S. Angelo, † August 1182

=== 17 December 1182 ===
- Bobo – cardinal-deacon of S. Angelo, then (12 March 1188) cardinal-priest of S. Anastasia, finally (May 1189) cardinal-bishop of Porto e S. Rufina, † 1189
- Ottaviano di Paoli – cardinal-deacon of SS. Sergio e Bacco, then (May 1189) cardinal-bishop of Ostia e Velletri, † 5 April 1206
- Gerardo – cardinal-deacon of S. Adriano, † 1208
- Soffredo – cardinal-deacon of S. Maria in Via Lata, then (20 February 1193) cardinal-priest of S. Prassede, † 14 December 1210
- Albino, Can.Reg. – cardinal-deacon of S. Maria Nuova, then (15 March 1185) cardinal-priest of S. Croce in Gerusalemme, finally (May 1189) cardinal-bishop of Albano, † 1196
- Pandolfo – cardinal-priest of SS. XII Apostoli, † ca.1210
- Uberto Crivelli – cardinal-priest of S. Lorenzo in Damaso, from 9 January 1185 also archbishop of Milan, became Pope Urban III (25 November 1185) † 20 October 1187

=== 1184 ===
- Thibaud, O.S.B.Cluny, abbot of Cluny – cardinal-bishop of Ostia e Velletri, † 4 November 1188

=== 15 March 1185 ===
- Melior, camerlengo of the Holy Roman Church – cardinal-priest of SS. Giovanni e Paolo, † 1197
- Adelardo Cattaneo – cardinal-priest of S. Marcello, then (November 1188) bishop of Verona and cardinalis Sancte Romane Ecclesie, † before October 1214
- Rolando, bishop-elect of Dol – cardinal-deacon of S. Maria in Portico, † shortly before 19 December 1187
- Pietro Diana – cardinal-deacon of S. Nicola in Carcere, then (12 March 1188) cardinal-priest of S. Cecilia, † 1206
- Radulf Nigellus – cardinal-deacon of S. Giorgio in Velabro, dann (12. March 1188) cardinal-priest of S.Prassede, † 30 December 1188

== Presumed cardinals ==
In older literature are mentioned also the following other cardinals ostensibly created by Lucius III, who, according to modern research should be eliminated from that list because there is no documentary proof of their promotion or they are confused with another cardinals:

Name	Alleged cardinalate	Notes
Uberto Allucingoli, nephew of the pope	Cardinal-priest of S. Lorenzo in Damaso in 1182–ca.1185	He is confused with Uberto Crivelli, future pope Urban III, who occupied the title of S. Lorenzo in Damaso between 1182 and 1185
Raniero il Piccolo	Cardinal-priest in 1182, he was present at absolution of king William of Scotland	He is the same as Raniero da Pavia, created cardinal-deacon of S. Giorgio by Alexander III and promoted to cardinal-priest of SS. Giovanni e Paolo by Lucius III
Simeone Paltinieri	Cardinal-priest from 1182 or 1185 until 1200	No such cardinal is attested in the contemporary sources. The cardinal with this name was actually created by Urban IV in 1261 and died in 1277
Giovanni	Cardinal-priest of S. Marco created in 1185, died under Urban III or Clement III	He is the same as cardinal Giovanni da Anagni, created by Adrian IV in 1158/59, who occupied the title of S. Marco from ca.1165 until 1190

== Sources ==
- Miranda, Salvador. "Consistories for the creation of Cardinals, 12th Century (1099-1198): Lucius III (1181-1185)". The Cardinals of the Holy Roman Church. Florida International University. OCLC 53276621.
- Elfriede Kartusch: Das Kardinalskollegium in der Zeit von 1181-1227. Wien 1948
- Werner Maleczek: Papst und Kardinalskolleg von 1191 bis 1216: die Kardinäle unter Coelestin III. und Innocenz III. Wien: Verlag der Österreichischen Akademie der Wissenschaften, 1984
- Klaus Ganzer, Die Entwicklung des auswärtigen Kardinalats im hohen Mittelalter, Max Niemeyer Verlag Tübingen 1963
- Johannes M. Brixius: Die Mitglieder des Kardinalkollegiums von 1130-1181. Berlin 1912
- Regesta Imperii – Liste der Kardinalsunterschriften unter Lucius III.
- Lorenzo Cardella: Memorie storiche de' cardinali della Santa Romana Chiesa, Rome 1792, vol. I, pt. 2
