= December 1187 papal election =

Election of Catholic Pope Clement III

Papal election December 1187

Dates and location
- 19 December 1187; Pisa

Key officials
- Dean: Konrad von Wittelsbach
- Camerlengo: Melior le Maitre
- Protopriest: Giovanni Conti da Anagni
- Protodeacon: Giacinto Bobone Orsini

Elected pope
- Paolo Scolari; Name taken: Clement III
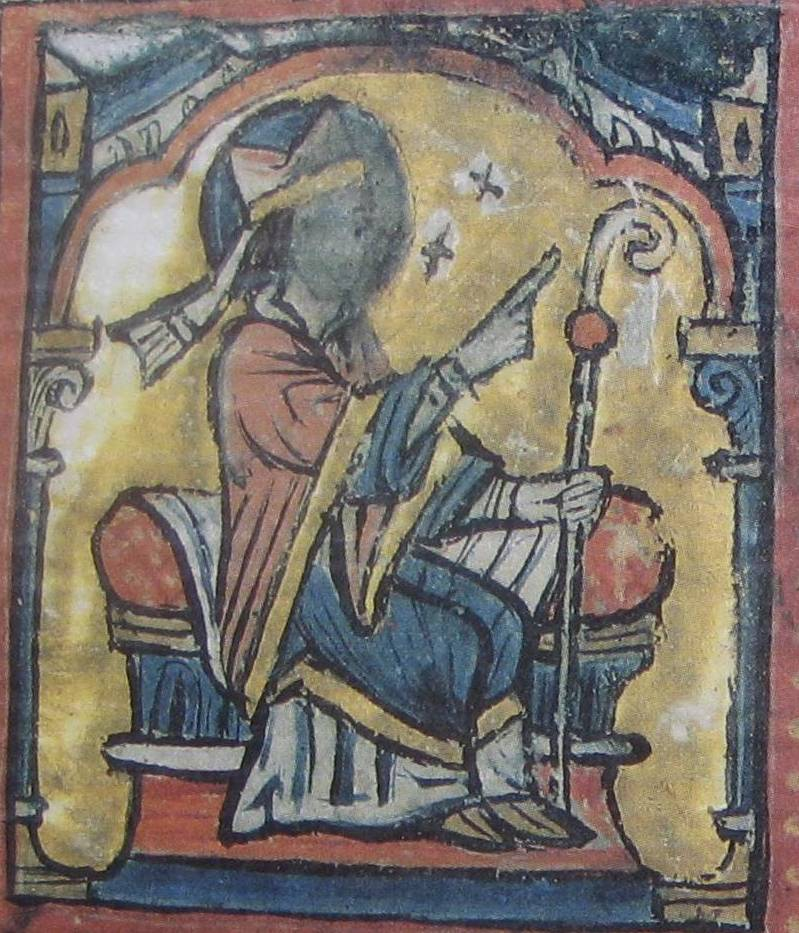

The December 1187 papal election (held on 19 December) was convoked after the death of Pope Gregory VIII. It resulted in the election of Cardinal Paolo Scolari, who took the name of Clement III.

== Verona and Ferrara ==
Alberto di Morra, as papal chancellor, had followed Pope Lucius III in his flight from the Roman campagna, to seek aid from the Emperor Frederick Barbarossa in Verona. Negotiations between the two quickly broke down, and the pope and his court found themselves trapped in Verona by a hostile emperor. Frederick besieged the pope in Verona, forbidding appeals to the pope from anyone in his domains, and obstructing appeals from elsewhere. Anyone apprehended in an attempt to reach the papal curia or returning from it was imprisoned and subjected to torture. Lucius died during the siege on 25 November 1185. His successor was Humbertus Crivelli, the Archbishop of Milan and Cardinal of S. Lorenzo in Damaso, " a violent and unyielding spirit, and a strong opponent of Frederick (Barbarossa)," in the words of Ferdinand Gregorovius. He took the name Urban III, and maintained all of the uncompromising policies of Lucius III. Urban III continued the hostilities with the emperor, offering no concessions, and finally arriving at the decision to excommunicate him. He was deterred only by the urgent pleas of the people of Verona. Urban and the cardinals who were besieged with him were able to escape from Verona in the last weeks of September 1187, taking refuge in Ferrara. Urban died there on 20 October 1187.

On the following day thirteen cardinals who had been present in Ferrara began the proceedings to elect his successor. The cardinals were aware that the papal chancellor, Albert di Morra, was in great favor with the Emperor Frederick Barbarossa, because he was a member of the imperial party in the curia, and because he reported to the emperor all the confidential activities of the Roman curia. On 21 October 1187 he was unanimously elected pope and took the name Gregory VIII.

Pope Gregory immediately began to reverse the anti-imperial policies of his predecessors. He announced that King Henry would be given an imperial coronation. The emperor Frederick immediately cancelled his blockade of the papal curia, and announced that Pope Gregory and his curia were free to go wherever they wished. Henry ordered Leo de Monumento, the Roman consul, and the German Count Anselm to conduct the pope safely to wherever he wished to go. Gregory travelled to Bologna (18–20 November 1187), Modena (22 November), Reggio Emilia (24 November), Parma (26–29 November), Lucca (7–9 December), and finally Pisa (10–17 December).

== Participants ==
At the death of Gregory VIII there were probably only 20 cardinals. Basing on the countersigning of the papal bulls in December 1187 it is possible to establish that at least 9 cardinals were present at Pisa at the death of Gregory VIII:

Elector	Place of birth	Title	Elevated	Elevator	Notes
Paolo Scolari	Rome	Bishop of Palestrina	21 September 1179	Alexander III	Archpriest of the patriarchal Liberian Basilica; elected Pope Clement III
Thibaud, O.S.B.Cluny	France	Bishop of Ostia e Velletri	1184	Lucius III	
Laborans de Pontormo	Pontormo	Priest of S. Maria in Trastevere	September 1173	Alexander III	
Melior, O.S.B.Vall.	Pisa	Priest of SS. Giovanni e Paolo	16 March 1185	Lucius III	Camerlengo of the Holy Roman Church
Giacinto Bobone	Rome	Deacon of S. Maria in Cosmedin	22 December 1144	Lucius II	Protodeacon; legate in Spain, 1188; future Pope Celestine III (1191-1198)
Graziano da Pisa	Pisa	Deacon of SS. Cosma e Damiano	4 March 1178	Alexander III	
Ottaviano di Paoli	Rome	Deacon of SS. Sergio e Bacco	18 December 1182	Lucius III	Future bishop of Ostia e Velletri (1189-1206)
Pietro Diana	Piacenza	Deacon of S. Nicola in Carcere	16 March 1185	Lucius III	
Radulfus Nigellus	probably France	Deacon of S. Giorgio in Velabro	16 March 1185	Lucius III	

Five electors were created by Pope Lucius III, three by Pope Alexander III, one by Pope Lucius II.

== Absentee cardinals ==
Probably eleven cardinals were absent:

Elector	Place of birth	Cardinalatial title	Elevated	Elevator	Notes
Konrad von Wittelsbach	Bavaria	Bishop of Sabina and Archbishop of Mainz	18 December 1165	Alexander III	prior cardinalium;
Henri de Marsiac, O.Cist.	Château de Marcy, France	Bishop of Albano	March 1179	Alexander III	Papal legate in Germany
Joannes Anagninus (Giovanni dei Conti di Anagni)	Anagni	Priest of S. Marco	1158/1159	Adrian IV	Protopriest
Ruggiero di San Severino	San Severino	Priest of S. Eusebio and Archbishop of Benevento	Ca. 1178-1180	Alexander III	
Guillaume aux Blanches Mains	France	Priest of S. Sabina and Archbishop of Reims	March 1179	Alexander III	Minister of State of the Kingdom of France
Albino, C.R.S.F.	Gaeta (?)	Priest of S. Croce in Gerusalemme	18 December 1182	Lucius III	Future bishop of Albano (1189-1197)
Pandolfo	Lucca	Priest of SS. XII Apostoli	18 December 1182	Lucius III	
Adelardo Cattaneo	Verona	Priest of S. Marcello	16 March 1185	Lucius III	Future bishop of Verona (1188-1214)
Soffredo	Pistoia	Deacon of S. Maria in Via Lata	18 December 1182	Lucius III	Papal legate in France
Bobo	Rome	Deacon of S. Angelo in Pescheria	18 December 1182	Lucius III	Papal legate in France
Gerardo	Lucca	Deacon of S. Adriano	18 December 1182	Lucius III	Papal Vicar

Seven absentees were created by Lucius III, three by Alexander III, and one by Adrian IV.

== Death of Gregory VIII and election of Pope Clement III ==
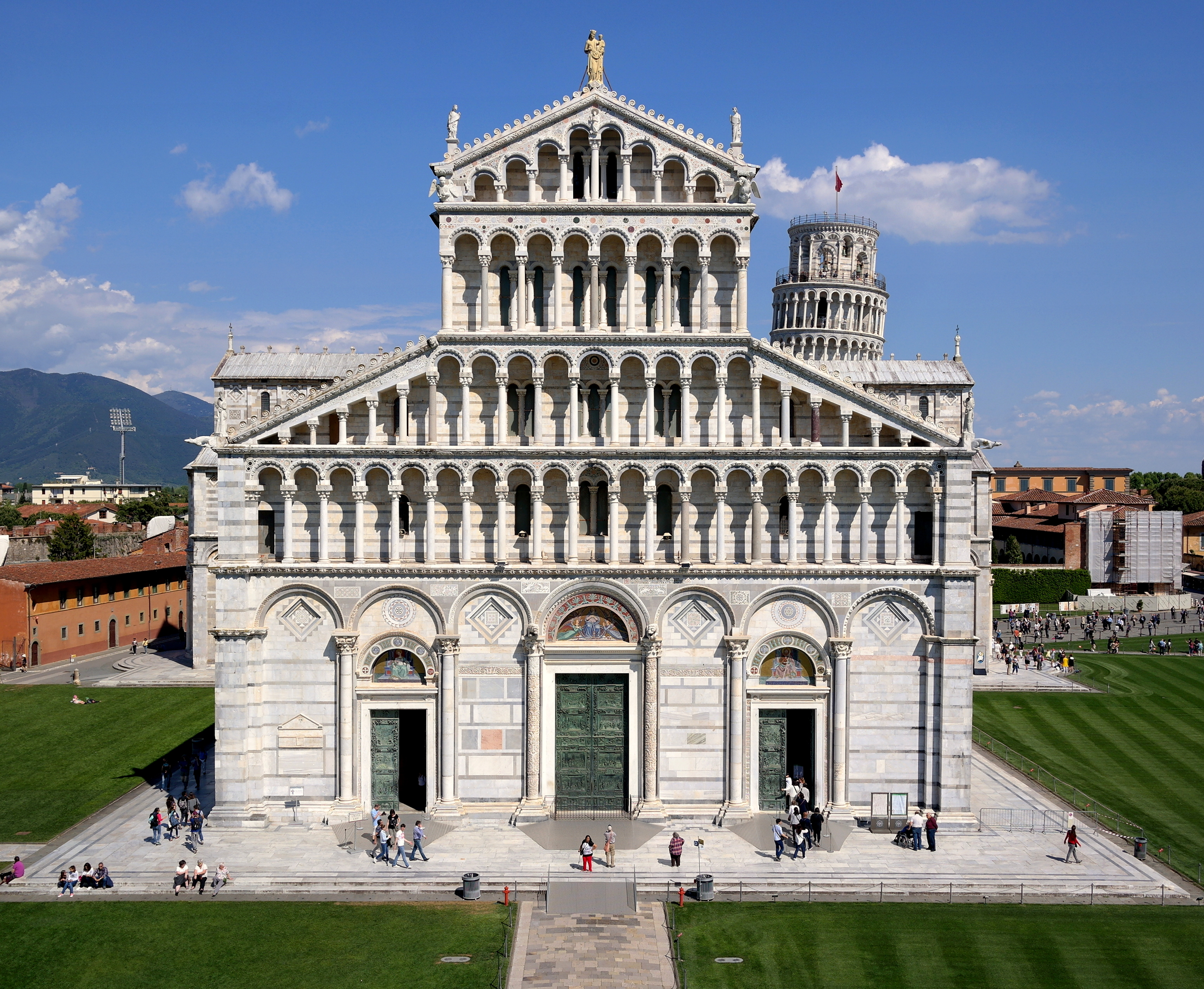
Facade of Pisa Cathedral, which was built in the 12th century.

Pope Gregory VIII died at Pisa of a brief illness, said to have been a fever lasting eight days, on 17 December 1187. He had been pope only one month and twenty-seven days.

Two days later the cardinals assembled in the cathedral of Pisa, and began proceedings to elect his successor. Cardinal Pietro Scolari had to be carried to the cathedral from the Hospitium Sancti Pauli de ripa Arni. The election was celebrated in the presence of the Consul of Rome, Leo de Monumento. The cardinals unanimously elected Cardinal Paolo Scolari, bishop of Palestrina, on 19 December 1187, the Saturday after the Feast of S. Barbara. He accepted his election and took the name Clement III. On 20 December, he was solemnly crowned by protodeacon Giacinto Bobone Orsini,

Immediate arrangements were begun for a return to Rome. Without delay Pope Clement sent his legates to the Roman people, in order to formulate a firm peace between him and them. Orders were issued to the papal chamberlain, Cencius Camerarius, to receive the oaths of office of the ostiarii of the Lateran palace, which was carried out on 22 January; the also issued instructions for their service. On 26 January 1188, Pope Clement was in Siena, and by 11 February 1188 he returned to Rome and was resident at the Lateran.

== Sources ==
- Gregorovius, Ferdinand (1896). The History of Rome in the Middle Ages Vol. IV, part 2. London: George Bell 1896.
- Jaffé, Philipp (1888). Regesta pontificum Romanorum ab condita Ecclesia ad annum post Christum natum MCXCVIII. Vol. II. Leipzig.
- Kartusch, Elfriede (1948). Das Kardinalskollegium in der Zeit von 1181–1227. Wien.
- Piazzoni, Ambrogio (2003). Historia wyboru papieży. Kraków: Wyd. M. ISBN 8372216487.
- Robinson, Ian Stuart (1990). The Papacy, 1073–1198: Continuity and Innovation. New York: Cambridge University Press. ISBN 0521264987.
- Watterich, J. B. M. (1862). Pontificum Romanorum qui fuerunt inde ab exeunte saeculo IX usque ad finem saeculi XIII vitae: ab aequalibus conscriptae (in Latin). Vol. Tomus II. Leipzig: G. Engelmann.
