= October 1187 papal election =

Election of Catholic Pope Gregory VIII

Papal election October 1187

Dates and location
- 21 October 1187; Ferrara

Key officials
- Dean: Konrad von Wittelsbach
- Camerlengo: Master Melior
- Protopriest: Alberto di Morra
- Protodeacon: Giacinto Bobone Orsini

Elected pope
- Alberto di Morra; Name taken: Gregory VIII

The October 1187 papal election (held October 21) was convoked after the death of Pope Urban III. He and the papal court had escaped from the imperial blockade of Verona only the month before, and had taken refuge in Ferrara. The election, held in Ferrara the day after the pope's death, resulted in the election of Cardinal Alberto Sartori di Morra, who took the name of Gregory VIII. He was a partisan of the Emperor Frederick Barbarossa, whose election delighted him. Gregory VIII reigned only two months.

== Popes at Verona ==
Lucius III was elected on 1 September 1181, but had to be consecrated and enthroned at Velletri, due to the hostility of the Romans. He was only allowed back to Rome at the end of October, but in mid-March 1182, having refused to grant the consuetudines conceded by earlier popes, he was forced to retreat to Velletri. In the meantime, refugees from Tusculum, which had been destroyed earlier in the century by the Roman commune, began to rebuild their fortifications. Annoyed by the challenge, the Roman commune reopened the war. Pope Lucius took the part of the Tusculans, but as the Romans had one success after another, he called for aid from the imperial Vicar in Italy, Archbishop Christian of Mainz, who managed to drive the Romans back. The Romans renewed their offensive, devastated the territory of Tusculum in April 1184, and then turned their wrath against Latium. The pope then fled to the Emperor Frederick, who was at Verona. The pope wanted aid against the Romans, of course, but there was also the issue of the inheritance of Countess Mathilda of Tuscany, which had been willed to Saint Peter, but which was occupied by the emperor, on the grounds that it was part of the empire and Mathilda and her husbands had been his vassals. Frederick wanted the pope to preside at an imperial coronation for his son Henry. When the pope adamantly refused, Henry invaded and ravaged the Roman campagna; Frederick besieged the pope in Verona, forbidding appeals to the pope from anyone in his domains, and obstructing appeals from elsewhere. Anyone apprehended in an attempt to reach the papal curia or returning from it was imprisoned and subjected to torture.

Lucius died on 25 November 1185, still residing in Verona, while an angry and uncooperative emperor resided at the imperial headquarters in Pavia. The election of his successor, which was brief and unanimous, took place on the next day. The successful candidate was Humbertus Crivelli, the Archbishop of Milan and Cardinal of S. Lorenzo in Damaso, " a violent and unyielding spirit, and a strong opponent of Frederick (Barbarossa)," in the words of Ferdinand Gregorovius. He took the name Urban III, and maintained all of the uncompromising policies of Lucius III. Frederick continued his policy of blockading the pope and cardinals inside Verona into 1187. Urban had reached the decision to excommunicate the emperor, for usurpation of spiritualities, but he was dissuaded by the pleas of the inhabitants of Verona. Shortly after 22 September 1187, Urban and the cardinals escaped from Verona, and by 3 October had found refuge in Ferrara, where Urban died on 20 October.

== List of participants ==
At the death of Pope Urban III there were probably 23 cardinals. Basing on the countersigning of the papal bulls in October 1187 it is possible to establish that probably 13 of them participated in the election of successor of Urban III. According to the rules established by Pope Alexander III, 9 votes would be necessary to elect.

Elector	Place of birth	Cardinalatial title	Elevated	Elevator	Notes
Henri de Marsiac, O.Cist.	Château de Marcy, France	Bishop of Albano	March 1179	Alexander III	Withdrew his candidacy at the election to the papacy
Paolo Scolari	Rome	Bishop of Palestrina	21, September 1179	Alexander III	Archpriest of the patriarchal Liberian Basilica; future Pope Clement III (1187–1191)
Thibaud, O.S.B.Cluny	France	Bishop of Ostia e Velletri	1184	Lucius III	
Alberto di Morra, C.R.Praem.	Benevento	Priest of S. Lorenzo in Lucina and Chancellor of the Holy Roman Church	21 December 1156	Adrian IV	Protopriest; elected Pope Gregory VIII
Pietro de Bono, C.R.S.M.R.	Rome	Priest of S. Susanna	18 March 1166	Alexander III	
Laborans de Pontormo	Pontormo	Priest of S. Maria in Trastevere	12 September 1173	Alexander III	
Melior, O.S.B.Vall.	Pisa	Priest of SS. Giovanni e Paolo	16 March 1185	Lucius III	Camerlengo of the Holy Roman Church
Adelardo Cattaneo	Verona	Priest of S. Marcello	16 March 1185	Lucius III	Future bishop of Verona (1188–1214)
Giacinto Bobone (Orsini)	Rome	Deacon of S. Maria in Cosmedin	22 December 1144	Lucius II	Protodeacon; future Pope Celestine III (1191–1198)
Graziano da Pisa	Pisa	Deacon of SS. Cosma e Damiano	4 March 1178	Alexander III	
Ottaviano di Paoli	Rome	Deacon of SS. Sergio e Bacco	18 December 1182	Lucius III	Future bishop of Ostia e Velletri (1189–1206)
Pietro Diani	Piacenza	Deacon of S. Nicola in Carcere	16 March 1185	Lucius III	
Radulfus Nigellus	Pisa or France	Deacon of S. Giorgio in Velabro	16 March 1185	Lucius III	

Six electors were created by Pope Lucius III, five by Pope Alexander III, one by Pope Lucius II and one by Pope Adrian IV.

== Absentee cardinals ==
Probably ten cardinals were absent:

Elector	Place of birth	Cardinalatial title	Elevated	Elevator	Notes
Konrad von Wittelsbach	Bavaria	Bishop of Sabina and Archbishop of Mainz	18 December 1165	Alexander III	prior cardinalium
Joannes Anagninus (Giovanni dei Conti di Anagni)	Anagni	Priest of S. Marco	1158/1159	Adrian IV	Protopriest; future bishop of Palestrina (1190–1196)
Guillaume aux Blanches Mains	France	Priest of S. Sabina and Archbishop of Reims	March 1179	Alexander III	Minister of State of the Kingdom of France
Ruggiero di San Severino	San Severino	Priest of S. Eusebio and Archbishop of Benevento	Ca. 1178-1180	Alexander III	External cardinal
Albino, C.R.S.F.	Gaeta (?)	Priest of S. Croce in Gerusalemme	December 18, 1182	Lucius III	Future bishop of Albano (1189–1197)
Pandolfo	Lucca	Priest of SS. XII Apostoli	18 December 1182	Lucius III	
Soffredo	Pistoia	Deacon of S. Maria in Via Lata	18 December 1182	Lucius III	Papal legate in France
Bobo	Rome	Deacon of S. Angelo in Pescheria	18 December 1182	Lucius III	Papal legate in France; future bishop of Porto e Santa Rufina (1189–1190)
Gerardo	Lucca	Deacon of S. Adriano	18 December 1182	Lucius III	Papal Vicar
Rolandus	Pisa	Deacon of S. Maria in Portico	16 March 1185	Lucius III	Former bishop-elect of Dol (1177–1185)

Six absentees were created by Lucius III, three by Alexander III, and one by Adrian IV.

== Death of Urban III and the election of Pope Gregory VIII ==
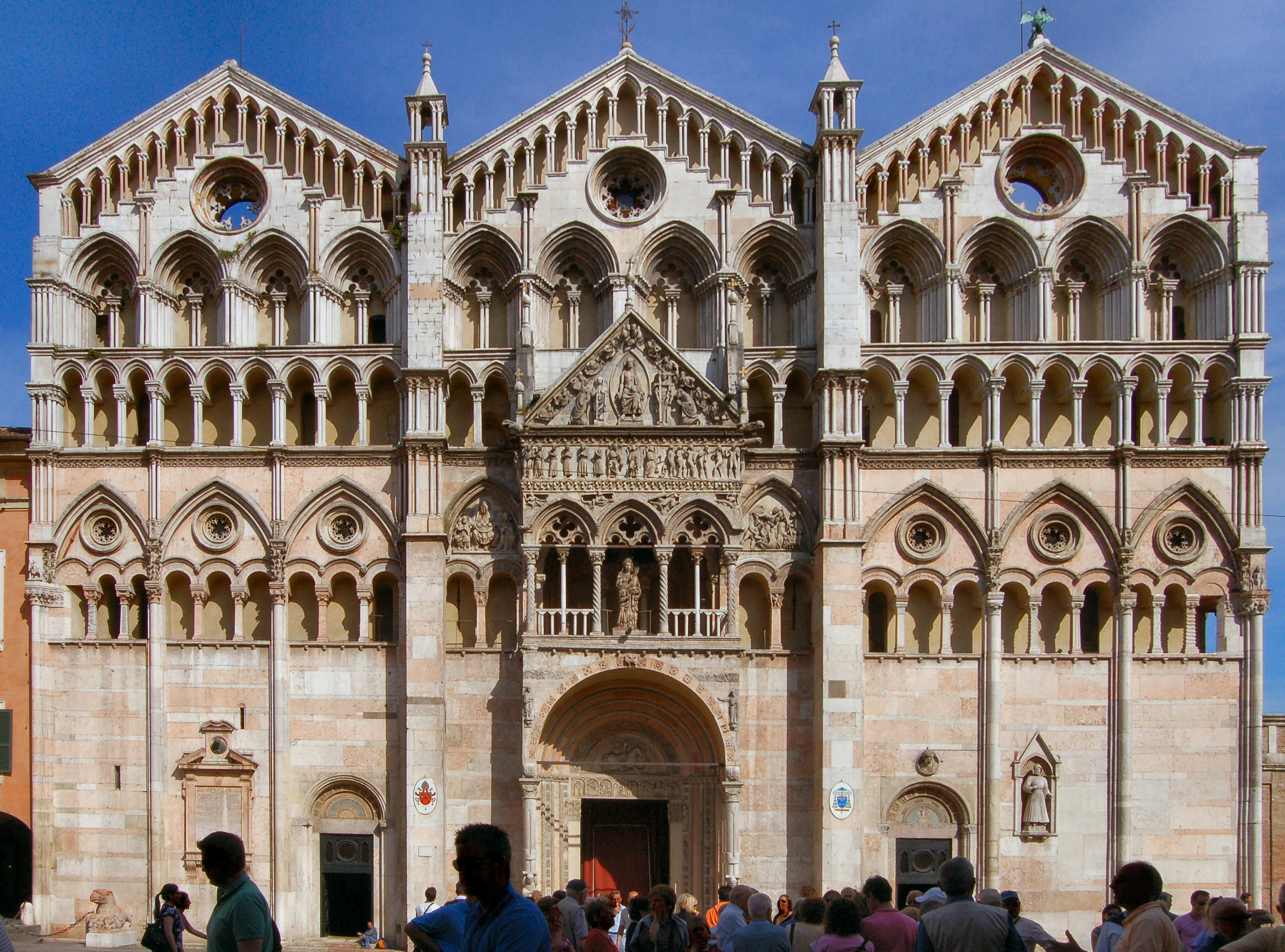
Facade of Ferrara Cathedral, which had been completed ten years earlier.

Pope Urban III died at Ferrara on 20 October 1187, grieving over the disasters in the Holy Land. On the following day thirteen cardinals who had been present in Ferrara began the proceedings to elect his successor. They operated according to the rules promulgated by Pope Alexander III at the Third Lateran Council in March 1179.

One of the cardinals under consideration was Henri de Marsiac, the former abbot of Clairvaux. He was aware that he did not have sufficient votes, and foreseeing and fearing the danger of dissension, he stood up and announced that, as a servant of the cross of Christ, he was prepared to preach the crusade in various kingdoms and peoples. He was obviously reacting to recent reports of disaster in the Holy Land.

Paolo Scolari and Alberto di Morra, the senior cardinal-priest, were also considered. Paolo Scolari was at a disadvantage because he was seriously ill at that time, and was not up to the burden, according to a remark attributed to Cardinal Henri de Marsiac. The cardinals were aware that the papal chancellor, Albert di Morra, was in great favor with the Emperor Frederick Barbarossa, because he was a member of the imperial party in the curia, and because he reported to the emperor all the confidential activities of the Roman curia. But there remained only the old papal chancellor Alberto di Morra. On 21 October 1187 he was unanimously elected pope and took the name Gregory VIII.

Shortly after the election, the two proctors of the archbishop of Canterbury met with Cardinal Henri de Marsiac. It was Henri who told them of the three candidates, of the indisposition of Cardinal Scolari, and of the election of Cardinal Alberto di Morra, faute de mieux.

He was consecrated a bishop and enthroned on 25 October. He reigned for one month and twenty-eight days.

It is reported by Robert of Auxerre in his Chronicon that the Emperor Frederick was delighted by the choice of Albert, since he was a favorer of justice and would be favorable to him.

== Sources ==
- Gregorovius, Ferdinand (1896). The History of Rome in the Middle Ages Vol. IV, part 2. London: George Bell 1896.
- Jaffé, Philipp (1888). Regesta pontificum Romanorum ab condita Ecclesia ad annum post Christum natum MCXCVIII. Vol. II. Leipzig.
- Kartusch, Elfriede (1948). Das Kardinalskollegium in der Zeit von 1181–1227. Wien.
- Robinson, Ian Stuart (1990). The Papacy, 1073–1198: Continuity and Innovation. New York: Cambridge University Press. ISBN 0521264987.
- Watterich, J. B. M. (1862). Pontificum Romanorum qui fuerunt inde ab exeunte saeculo IX usque ad finem saeculi XIII vitae: ab aequalibus conscriptae (in Latin). Vol. Tomus II. Leipzig: G. Engelmann.
