= Cardinals created by Alexander III =

Catholic appointments from 1160 to 1180

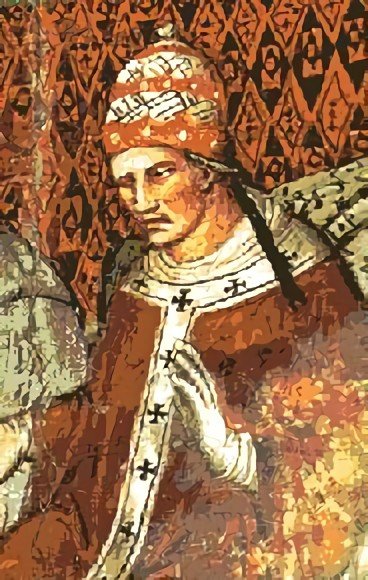
Pope Alexander III.

Pope Alexander III (r. 1159–81) created 68 cardinals in fifteen consistories he held throughout his pontificate. This included the elevation of his two future successors Urban III and Clement III and he also elevated a cardinal whom he later named as a saint.

== 18 February 1160 ==
- Milo

== 1163 ==
- Konrad von Wittelsbach
- Antonio
- Manfredo O.S.B.
- Ugo Ricasoli
- Oderisio O.S.B. Cas.

== 1164 ==
- Ugo Pierleoni Can. Reg.
- Ottone
- Benerede O.S.B.
- Teodino degli Atti O.S.B.
- Pietro Caetani
- Vitellio O.S.B.
- Girolamo Can. Reg.
- Eguillino

== 15 December 1165 ==
- Ermanno
- St. Galdino della Sala
- Raniero
- Teodino O.S.B. Cas.
- Pietro de Bono Can. Reg.
- Ermanno
- Bonifazio

== 1168 ==
- Giovanni O.S.B.
- Rainaldo O.S.B. Cas.

== 1170 ==
- Odone
- Gérard d'Autun
- Vernavero
- Lesbio Grassi
- Leonato O.S.B.
- Riso

== 1171 ==
- Ugo Pierleoni Can. Reg.
- Thibaud O.S.B. Clun.
- Lombardo

== September 1173 ==
- Laborans
- Pietro
- Guglielmo
- Uberto Crivelli (Note: Elected as Pope Urban III in 1185 and reigned until his death in 1187.)
- Marcello
- Raniero

== 7 March 1175 ==
- Vibiano
- Gerardo

== December 1176 ==
- Pietro
- Tiberio Savelli
- Gandolfo O.S.B.

== March 1178 ==
- Pietro
- Pietro
- Matteo Can. Reg.
- Graziano
- Ardoino

== 22 September 1178 ==
- Ardoino da Piacenza Can. Reg.
- Giovanni
- Bernardo
- Rainier
- Paolo
- Eutichio

== December 1178 ==
- Pietro da Pavia O.S.B.
- Rogerio O.S.B. Cas., Cardinal-priest of Sant'Eusebio
- Mathieu d'Anjou
- Herbert of Bosham
- Jacopo

== March 1179 ==
- Henri de Marsiac O.Cist.
- Guillaume de Champagne
- Roberto
- Galando
- Ildeberto
- Paolo Scolari (Note: Elected as Pope Clement III in 1187 and reigned until his death in 1191.)
- Tiburzio

== 1180 ==
- Bernardo
- Rolando Paparoni

== See also ==
· · · · · ·

== Sources ==
- Miranda, Salvador. "Consistories for the creation of Cardinals 12th Century (1099-1198): Alexander III". The Cardinals of the Holy Roman Church. Florida International University. OCLC 53276621.
