= Radulfus Nigellus =

Italian cardinal

Cardinal Radulfus Nigellus
- Cardinal-Priest
- Church: Santa Prassede (1188)

Orders
- Created cardinal: March 1185 by Pope Lucius III
- Rank: Cardinal Deacon, then Cardinal Priest

Personal details
- Born: Pisa (?)
- Died: 30 December 1188 Mortara
- Residence: Rome, Verona
- Occupation: courtier papal legate
- Profession: parish priest

Radulfus Nigellus (died 30 December 1188) was a cardinal of the Roman Catholic Church. He was a native of Pisa, or perhaps of France.

== Life ==
Radulfus held the title magister, though the source of the title and the expertise which supported it are unknown.

Driven out of Rome by the Roman commune, due to the war over Tusculum, Pope Lucius III (1181–1185) fled to the Emperor Frederick Barbarossa, who was at Verona. Some of the cardinals followed Pope Lucius to Verona; others, however, whose followers had perpetrated the outrages at Tusculum and in the Roman campagna, remained in the city. Radulfus was a member of the papal court and followed Pope Lucius III in his flight from the Roman commune to Verona in July 1184. Far from obtaining aid from the emperor Frederick Barbarossa, they fell into quarreling, and the papal court became prisoner of the emperor in Verona.

=== Cardinal deacon ===
Radulfus was named a cardinal by Pope Lucius III (1181 – 1185) in Verona on Ash Wednesday 1185, and assigned the deaconry of San Giorgio in Velabro in Rome. He first subscribed his name to a papal document, as far as current evidence shows, on 4 April 1185. His latest known signature as cardinal deacon of S. Giorgio is on 17 March 1188 at the Lateran.

Lucius died on 25 November 1185 in Verona, while an angry and uncooperative emperor resided at the imperial headquarters in Pavia. The election of his successor, in which Cardinal Radulfus took part, was held on the next day. It was brief and unanimous. The successful candidate was Humbertus Crivelli, the Archbishop of Milan and Cardinal of S. Lorenzo in Damaso, "a violent and unyielding spirit, and a strong opponent of Frederick (Barbarossa)," in the words of Ferdinand Gregorovius. He took the name Urban III, and maintained all of the uncompromising policies of Lucius III. He and the papal court continued as virtual prisoners in Verona. Cardinal Radulfus signed documents for Pope Urban from 9 December 1185 to 13 October 1187.

Urban III and the cardinals, including Radulfus, managed to escape from Verona in the second half of September 1187, but Pope Urban III died at Ferrara on 20 October 1187, grieving over the disasters in the Holy Land. In the election which followed, there were three candidates, Henri de Marsiac, Paolo Scolari, and Alberto di Morra. Alberto, the leader of the imperial faction, was elected as Gregory VIII on 21 October 1187. He immediately began plans to return to Rome, with the cooperation of the emperor and the officials of Rome, but he reigned for one month and twenty-eight days, managing to reach only as far as Pisa. During that brief time, Radulfus subscribed several documents in Ferrara, Modena, Parma, and Pisa.

Cardinal Radulfus participated in his third papal election in twenty-five months at Pisa. The cardinals unanimously elected Cardinal Paolo Scolari, Bishop of Palestrina, on 19 December 1187, the Saturday after the Feast of S. Barbara. He accepted his election and took the name Clement III. By 11 February 1188, he, the cardinals, and the papal court had returned to Rome and were resident at the Lateran.

=== Cardinal priest ===
On 17 March 1188, Cardinal Radulfus appears as a cardinal priest with the titulus of Santa Prassede. He is mentioned in a letter of Pope Clement III to Archbishop Baldwin of Canterbury on 10 December 1188; the archbishop and the monks of Canterbury are to obey papal decisions in the matter of the appointment of the prior; the pope had given mandates in his instructions to the Cardinal of Santa Prassede, Apostolicae Sedis legato. Radulfus, however, never reached England, because he died at Mortara on 30 December 1188.

Radulfus' successor at S. Prassede, Cardinal Rufinus, subscribed a document for Pope Clement III.

== Sources ==
- Ciaconius (Chacón), Alphonsus (1677). Agostinus Olduinus (ed.). Vitae et res gestae pontificum romanorum et S.R.E. cardinalium (in Latin). Vol. I. Roma: P. et A. De Rubeis. p. 1121.
- Duchesne, François (1660). Les Preuves du livre premier de l' histoire de tous les cardinaux françois (in French) (Paris 1660). p. 141.
- Jaffé, Philipp (1888). Regesta pontificum Romanorum ab condita Ecclesia ad annum post Christum natum MCXCVIII (in Latin). Vol. II. Leipzig.
- Kartusch, Elfriede (1948). Das Kardinalskollegium in der Zeit von 1181–1227 (in German). Wien.
