= Laborans de Pontormo =

Italian cardinal

Cardinal Laborans de Pontormo
- Cardinal-priest
- Church: Santa Maria in Trastevere (1182-1189)

Orders
- Created cardinal: 1173 by Pope Alexander III
- Rank: Cardinal Deacon, then Cardinal Priest

Personal details
- Born: c. 1120-1125 Pontormo, Tuscany
- Died: c. 1189 Rome
- Residence: Paris, Capua, Rome, Verona
- Occupation: legal scholar
- Profession: courtier
- Education: University of Paris

Laborans de Pontormo (died 1189) was an Italian cardinal. His name in Italian is Laborante. He was a native of Pontormo, a suburb of the city of Florence on the left bank of the Arno River. He was a distinguished jurist and influential writer on canon law.

== Life ==
Laborans was born at Pontormo, c. 1120–1125. He studied in Paris, where he achieved the rank of Master, and then travelled in France, Germany, and the Kingdom of Sicily.

By the 1150s, he was a canon of the cathedral chapter of Capua. Before 1160, he visited Sicily, and the court of King William I at Palermo.

His Tractatus de justitia, which he dedicated to the Norman grand admiral Maio of Bari, belongs to the years 1154–1160. A second treatise, De Vera libertate, dedicated to Archbishop Hugh of Palermo, was written sometime between 1140 and 1160. Between 1162 and 1182, he wrote his Compilatio decretorum. The work is an effort to restructure Gratian's Decretum, removing duplications and adding additional material.

=== Cardinal deacon ===
He was already Cardinal deacon of S. Maria in Porticu on 21 September 1173. On 15 March 1174, while residing with Pope Alexander in Anagni, he subscribed a privilege in favor of the archbishop and diocese of Capua, naming in detail the diocesan boundaries and the churches under its control. He was in Ferentino when he subscribed a similar privilege for the collegiate church of Beaune on 23 February 1175; and another privilege, also at Ferentino on 13 March 1175. On 22 November 1175, he subscribed a bull at Anagni, where the papal court had moved in mid-October.

Cardinal Laborans was certainly present in Rome at the Third Lateran Council of Pope Alexander III, whose plenary sessions were held on 5 March, 7 March, and 19 March 1179. On 12 March 1179, he was at the Lateran, and was one of eleven cardinals who signed a privilege of Pope Alexander in favor of the monastery of S. Maria de Floresse. He was one of twenty-two cardinals who subscribed a bull on 20 March 1179. After the conclusion of the council, Cardinal Laborans took care to insert the various canons into the appropriate places of his work-in-progress, Compilatio decretorum.

His latest known subscription as a cardinal deacon occurs on 27 July 1179.

=== Cardinal priest ===
In 1179, either at the Ember Days of autumn or the Ember Days of winter, he was promoted Cardinal priest of the titulus of S. Maria trans Tiberim by Pope Alexander III. He began subscribing papal documents with his new title on 26 February 1180.

Driven out of Rome by the Roman commune, due to the war over Tusculum, Pope Lucius III (1181–1185) fled to the Emperor Frederick Barbarossa, who was at Verona. Some of the cardinals followed Pope Lucius to Verona; others, however, whose followers had perpetrated the outrages at Tusculum and in the Roman campagna, remained in the city.

=== Exile in Verona ===
Ten cardinals who were with the refugee pope participated in the consecration of the cathedral of Modena on 14 July 1184. Their names are recorded: Theodinus of Porto, Tebaldus of Ostia; Joannes of S. Marco, Laborans of S. Maria Transtiberim, Pandulfus of Ss. Apostolorum, Ubertus of S. Lorenzo in Damaso; Ardicio of S. Teodoro, Graziano of Ss. Cosma e Damiano, Goffredfus of S. Maria in Via Lata, and Albinus of S. Maria Nuova. When the relations between the pope and the emperor deteriorated, the entire papal court became besieged in Verona. Cardinal Laborans subscribed a privilege for the chapter of the cathedral of Pistoria in Verona on 4 April 1185.

Lucius died on 25 November 1185, still residing in Verona, while an angry and uncooperative emperor resided at the imperial headquarters in Pavia. The election of his successor, in which Cardinal Laborans took part, was held on the next day. It was brief and unanimous. The successful candidate was Humbertus Crivelli, the Archbishop of Milan and Cardinal of S. Lorenzo in Damaso, " a violent and unyielding spirit, and a strong opponent of Frederick (Barbarossa)," in the words of Ferdinand Gregorovius. He took the name Urban III, and maintained all of the uncompromising policies of Lucius III. He and the papal court continued as virtual prisoners in Verona. Cardinal Laborans subscribed for the new pope on 16 December 1185 at Verona.

=== Escape to Ferrara ===
Urban and the cardinals who were besieged with him were able to escape from Verona in the last weeks of September 1187, taking refuge in Ferrara. Urban died there on 20 October 1187. On the following day, thirteen cardinals who had been present in Ferrara, including Laborans, began the proceedings to elect his successor. The cardinals were aware that the papal chancellor, Albert di Morra, was in great favor with the Emperor Frederick Barbarossa, because he was a member of the imperial party in the curia, and because he reported to the emperor all the confidential activities of the Roman curia. On 21 October 1187, he was unanimously elected pope and took the name Gregory VIII.

Cardinal Laborans signed a bull at Ferrara for Gregory VIII on 31 October 1187.

=== Return to Rome ===
Pope Gregory VIII died at Pisa of a brief illness, on 17 December 1187. He had been pope only one month and twenty-seven days. Two days later the cardinals, including Laborans, assembled in the cathedral of Pisa, and began proceedings to elect his successor. The election was conducted in the presence of the Consul of Rome, Leo de Monumento. The cardinals unanimously elected Cardinal Paolo Scolari, bishop of Palestrina, on 19 December 1187. He took the name Clement III. Immediate arrangements were begun for a return to Rome. While still in Pisa, Cardinal Laborans subscribed a privilege for the new pope on 23 December 1187.

The papal court finally reached Rome in the first week of February 1188. On 13 Februiary, Cardinal Laborans was at the Lateran, where he subscribed a bull in favor of S. Maria Grandisgurgis. He subscribed at the Lateran on 2 June 1188, and another on 3 June; one on 8 June, and two on 9 June. He subscribed twice on 21 June.

Cardinal Laborans subscribed on 31 March 1189 at the Lateran; again on 15 April; on 20 April; on 12 June; on 26 June.

The last reference to Laborans occurs on 6 October 1189, and it is presumed that he died within the next year or two.

== Sources ==
- Brixius, J. M. (1912). Die Mitglieder des Kardinalkollegiums von 1130-1181 (in German), Berlin 1912, p. 63 no. 15.
- Enzensberger, H. (1987). "Cultura giuridica e amministrativa nel Regno normanno-svevo," (in Italian) in: M. Bellomo (ed.), Scuole, diritto e società nel Mezzogiorno medievale d'Italia,Vol. II, Catania 1987, pp. 169–188.
- Häring, Nikolaus (1974). "Chartres and Paris Revisited." in: J. R. O'Donnell (ed.), Essays in honor of Anton Charles Pegis (Toronto: Pontifical Institute of Medieval Studies 1974), pp. 268–329, at p. 311.
- Jaffé, Philipp (1888). S. Lowenfeld (ed.). Regesta pontificum Romanorum ab condita Ecclesia ad annum post Christum natum MCXCVIII (in Latin). Vol. II (2nd ed.). Leipzig.
- Theiner, Augustinus (1836). Disquisitiones criticae in praecipuas canonum et decretalium collectiones. (in Latin) Rome: Collegio Urbano, pp. 399–447.

=== External links ===
- Loschiavo, Luca (2004). "LABORANTE." (in Italian) Dizionario Biografico degli Italiani Volume 62 (Treccani: 2004).
- Pio, Berardo (2006). "MAIONE da Bari." (in Italian) Dizionario Biografico degli Italiani Volume 67 (2006). [Laborans' patron in the Kingdom of Sicily]
