= Graziano da Pisa =

Italian cardinal and papal diplomat

Cardinal Graziano da Pisa
- Cardinal-Deacon
- Church: Santi Cosma e Damiano (1178-1205)

Orders
- Created cardinal: 3 March 1178 by Pope Alexander III
- Rank: Cardinal Deacon

Personal details
- Born: Pisa
- Died: 1205 Rome
- Residence: Pisa, Bologna, Rome, Velletri, Verona
- Occupation: diplomat, bureaucrat
- Profession: lawyer (title of Magister)
- Education: University of Bologna

Graziano da Pisa (Gratianus Pisanus) (died 1205) was a cardinal of the Roman Catholic Church. He was a native of Pisa, and the nephew of Pope Eugenius III (1145-1153). He had studied law in Bologna, and held the rank of Magister. He was a prominent official in the papal chancery, and an accomplished papal diplomat.

== Life ==
Gratianus studied law in Bologna, in company with Stephen of Tournai, under the "Golden Mouth", Bulgarus of Bologna (d. 1166). He held the title of Magister.

The argument has been made that Magister Graziano da Pisa was the "Cardinalis" who was one of the earliest glossators of the Decretum of Gratian, in the 1150s or 1160s.

He was already a member of the papal chancery when he acted as datary for a bull signed by Pope Alexander III at Benevento on 21 March 1168. He signs himself, per manum Gratiani, Sanctae Romanae Ecclesiae subdiaconi et notarii. The exact same subscription is found in documents dated at Anagni on 23 January and on 26 January 1178. He is sometimes given the title Vicechancellor.

=== Diplomat ===
In 1169, Magister Graziano and Magister Vivianus, an advocate of the Roman church and Archdeacon of Orvieto, were sent by Pope Alexander as his third set of nuncios, bearing letters for King Henry II of England and Archbishop Thomas of Canterbury. They arrived in France in August, but had a considerable wait at Sens, since the king was campaigning in Gascony. When their meeting finally took place, the sessions were full of acrimony, and neither side seemed ready to give way. In disgust at the king, Graziano returned to Italy; Vivianus remained, making additional attempts to find solutions. He wrote several reports to Pope Alexander on his and Graziano's doings, explaining the various proposals on both sides, and the reasons for their failure.

In 1171, following the murder of Archbishop Becket, they were sent again, to Normandy, but the king appealed directly to Rome and withdrew to England, so that he did not meet the legates.

=== Chancery ===
Magister Graziano was with the papal court at Anagni, where the papal court had been in residence since 28 March 1173. There he dated a bull on 4 April 1174, on 10 June 1174, on 30 June 1174, and another on 17 July 1174. They then moved to Ferentino, some 13 km. to the south, where Pope Alexander resided from 25 October 1174 to 10 October 1175. There Graziano acted as datary on a bull of 19 November 1174, 30 December 1174, 14 February 1175, 13 March 1175, 28 March 1175, 5 July 1175, and 10 August 1175. He was at Anagni with the papal court, and acted as datary on 19 October 1175.

He accompanied the papal court to Venice, where the pope resided from 11 May 1177 to 15 October 1177, for the negotiations which led to the peace between the pope and the Emperor Frederick Barbarossa. During the trip he notarized and dated bulls at Ferrara on 1 and 7 May 1177. He acted as datary and notary in Venice for bulls of 28 June 1177, 9 July 1177, 10 July, 31 July, 6 August, 18 August, and 29 September 1177. At Anagni, on 23 January 1178, he also acted as datary and notary. He also executed the document of 7 February 1178.

=== Cardinal ===
Gratianus was created a cardinal by Pope Alexander III on 3 March 1178, and was assigned the deaconry of Santi Cosma e Damiano in the Roman Forum. His earliest known signature on a papal document as a cardinal occurs on 28 March 1178 at the Lateran. On 2 January 1179, he was at Tusculum, where he subscribed a bull. On 26 March 1179, at the Lateran, he subscribed a bull for the abbey of S. Savinus in Piacenza, and on 10 August 1179 at Segni another bull for the priory of S. Giovanni Laterano. He subscribed for Alexander III on 24 May 1181. Pope Alexander died at Cività Castellana on 30 August 1181. Two days later, on 1 September 1181, the cardinals assembled, probably including Cardinal Graziano though there is no positive evidence. They may have met at Velletri, and elected the senior member of the Sacred College, Cardinal Ubaldo of Lucca, Bishop of Ostia. He took the name Lucius III. He was crowned on 6 September by Cardinal Teodino of Porto at Velletri. On 5 November 1181, Pope Lucius, having made a peace with the Roman commune, signed a bull at the Lateran for the collegiate chapter of S. Martino in Siena, to which Cardinal Gratianus subscribed.

==== Refuge in Verona ====
Driven out of Rome by the Roman commune, due to the war over Tusculum, Pope Lucius III (1181–1185) fled to the Emperor Frederick Barbarossa, who was at Verona, expecting to receive assistance for Tusculum and against the Romans. Some of the cardinals followed Pope Lucius to Verona; others, however, whose followers had perpetrated the outrages at Tusculum and in the Roman campagna, remained in the city. Far from obtaining aid from the emperor Frederick Barbarossa, they fell into quarreling, and the papal court became prisoner of the emperor in Verona.

Ten cardinals who were with the refugee pope Lucius participated in the consecration of the cathedral of Modena on 14 July 1184. They were: Theodinus of Porto, Tebaldus of Ostia; Joannes of S. Marco, Laborans of S. Maria Transtiberim, Pandulfus of Ss. Apostolorum, Ubertus of S. Lorenzo in Damaso; Ardicio of S. Teodoro, Graziano of Ss. Cosma e Damiano, Goffredfus of S. Maria in Via Lata, and Albinus of S. Maria Nuova.

On 11 November 1185, two weeks before the pope's death Cardinal Graziano and his seventeen colleagues subscribed a bull in favor of the monastery of S. Peter Lobiensis. Lucius died on 25 November 1185, and the election of his successor took place immediately after the funeral on the same day. Cardinal Graziano certainly participated in the election of a new pope, which was brief and unanimous. The successful candidate, was Humbertus Crivelli, the Archbishop of Milan and Cardinal of S. Lorenzo in Damaso, " a violent and unyielding spirit, and a strong opponent of Frederick (Barbarossa)," in the words of Ferdinand Gregorovius. He took the name Urban III. Graziano began subscribing documents for Urban III on 9 December 1185. In September 1187, Pope Urban was able to make his escape from the imperial blockade of Verona, and flee to Ferrara. In Ferrara, Cardinal Graziano subscribed a bull on 13 October 1187. Pope Urban died in Ferrara on 20 October 1187.

==== Ferrara and Pisa ====
On the following day, thirteen cardinals who had been present in Ferrara, including Graziano da Pisa, began the proceedings to elect his successor. The papal chancellor, Albert di Morra, who was in great favor with the Emperor Frederick Barbarossa was unanimously elected pope on 21 October 1187, and took the name Gregory VIII. He immediately began to return the papal court to Rome. They travelled to Bologna (18–20 November 1187), Modena (22 November), Reggio Emilia (24 November), Parma (26–29 November), Lucca (7–9 December), and finally Pisa (10–17 December). Cardinal Graziano subscribed for him at Ferrara on 31 October 1187, at Modena on 22 November, at Parma on 28 November, and at Pisa on 11 December. Pope Gregory died in Pisa on 17 December 1187, after a brief illness, said to have been a fever lasting eight days. He had been pope only one month and twenty-seven days. Two days later, the cardinals assembled in the cathedral of Pisa, and began proceedings to elect his successor. The cardinals unanimously elected Cardinal Paolo Scolari, bishop of Palestrina, on 19 December 1187, the Saturday after the Feast of S. Barbara. He took the name Clement III. Cardinal Graziano subscribed for the new pope on 23 December 1187.

==== Rome ====
Cardinal Graziano subscribed for Pope Celestine III on 10 November 1194 at the Lateran, and on 16 November at St. Peter's. He subscribed at the Lateran on 17 April 1195, on 24, 25 and 29 April. On 27 April 1195, Pope Celestine wrote a letter to the Emperor Henry VI, the son of Barbarossa, informing him that he was sending a legation to his court, originally to consist of three cardinals, John of Praeneste, Petrus Diani of S. Cecilia, and Graziano of Ss. Cosma e Damiano; John, however, was prevented by debilitate corporis. Their mission was threefold: to bring about a peace, to obtain the Jerusalem subsidy, and to bring a message to improve the common good of the whole Christian community. On 1 August 1195, the pope wrote a letter to all the archbishops, bishops, and other prelates per Alemaniam et Teutoniam, ordering them to induce the people to give to the Jerusalem subsidy, following the directions of Cardinal Petrus of S. Cecilia and Cardinal Joannes of S. Stephani in Monte Celio. No mention is made of Cardinal Graziano.

After a long intermission, he subscribed again on 9 February 1196.

==== Legate to Genoa and Pisa ====
In 1198, shortly after the election of Pope Innocent III on 8 January, Cardinal Petrus Diani and Cardinal Graziano da Pisa were sent as legates to Pisa and Genoa, to arrange a peace between the two perpetually warring cities, so that a crusade could be preached and supplied by the Genoese and Pisan fleets. They were unsuccessful in bringing about a peace, but they were able to enroll people in the crusade.

Graziano subscribed until 16 June 1205. He died in Rome in 1205.

== Sources ==
- Brixius, Johannes Matthias (1912). Die Mitglieder des Kardinalkollegiums von 1130–1181 (in German). Berlin: R. Trenkel.
- Ciaconius (Chacón), Alphonsus (1677). Agostinus Olduinus (ed.). Vitae et res gestae pontificum romanorum: et S.R.E. cardinalium (in Latin). Vol. Tomus primus (2nd ed.). Roma: P. et A. De Rubeis. p. 1120.
- Jaffé, Philipp (1888). Regesta pontificum Romanorum ab condita Ecclesia ad annum post Christum natum MCXCVIII (in Latin). Vol. II. Leipzig.
- Kartusch, Elfriede (1948). Das Kardinalskollegium in der Zeit von 1181–1227 (in German). Wien.
- Migne, J. P. (ed.), Patrologiae Latinae Cursus Completus Tomus CC (in Latin) (Paris 1855).
- Migne, J. P. (ed.), Patrologiae Latinae Cursus Completus Tomus CCI (in Latin) (Paris 1855).
- Migne, J. P. (ed.), Patrologiae Latinae Cursus Completus, Tomus CCII (in Latin) (Paris 1855).
- Migne, J. P. (ed.), Patrologiae Latinae Cursus Completus Tomus CCIV (in Latin) (Paris 1855).
- Migne, J. P. (ed.), Patrologiae Latinae Cursus Completus Tomus CCVI (in Latin) (Paris 1855).
