= Soffred =

Italian cardinal born in Pistoia (died 1210)

Soffred (died 14 December 1210, Pistoia) was an Italian cardinal. His name is also given as Soffredo Errico Gaetani, whilst his Christian name is also spelled Soffrido or Goffredo in some sources.

== Life ==
Born in Pistoia, he was made cardinal deacon of Santa Maria in Via Lata in the 1182 consistory. He took part in the 1185 conclave, which elected pope Urban III. In 1187, he and cardinal Andrea Bobone were made papal legates to France to mediate between Philip II of France and Henry II of England - the two legates succeeded in sealing a two-year truce between the two kings.

He took part in the October and December 1187 conclaves which elected pope Gregory VIII and pope Clement III. He and cardinal Pietro Diana were sent to mediate between Genoa and Pisa. He also took part in the 1191 conclave, which elected pope Celestine III and that of 1198. During summer 1198, he and cardinal Peter of Capua were chosen as papal legates to follow the crusader army which was about to set out on a new crusade. Despite this, Soffred remained in the curia and Peter went to Venice to prepare to make the crossing. In 1201, the chapter of the metropolitan cathedral of Ravenna requested him as their archbishop, but the pope chose not to ratify this since he wished to keep the cardinal in his court in Rome. Until the end of May 1202, when he finally set out for the Holy Land, Soffred remained in the curia and represented the prosecution in several trials.

Arriving in Acre, he moved to Tripoli to end the succession dispute between Bohemond IV of Antioch and Leo II of Armenia - a conflict which had held back the crusader forces. The papal delegates spent months trying to resolve the conflict but to no avail. On 16 August 1203, the pope made Soffred patriarch of Jerusalem, but dismissed him from the post the following year. In autumn 1204, he and Peter moved to Constantinople, which had been in crusader hands since April the same year. Peter remained there but Soffred travelled on to the kingdom of Thessalonica, ruled over by Boniface I of Monferrato, to thank him for his assistance in establishing the Latin clergy in the new empire. In August 1205, Soffred returned to the curia and on the following 5 December signed a papal privilege for the first time after his time in the Holy Land. He spent his final years in retirement, probably in Pistoia, performing minor tasks.

In 1208, he became cardinal protopresbyter.

Preceded by Aymar the Monk	Latin Patriarch of Jerusalem; 1203–1204	Succeeded by Albert of Vercelli
