= Bobo of Porto =

12th-century Roman Catholic cardinal

Cardinal Bobo (Orsini)
- Cardinal-Bishop
- Church: Santa Maria in Portico (1182-1188); Sant'Anastasia (1188-1189)
- Diocese: Porto (1189)

Orders
- Created cardinal: December 1182 by Pope Lucius III
- Rank: Cardinal Deacon, then Cardinal Priest, then Cardinal Bishop

Personal details
- Born: Rome
- Died: c. 1189 Rome ?
- Residence: Rome, Verona
- Occupation: diplomat, administrator
- Profession: bishop

Bobo (died 1189 or 1190) was a cardinal of the Roman Catholic Church. He was a native of Rome, and a member of the Bobone family, later called the Orsini.

== Life ==
Bobo was created a cardinal by Pope Lucius III in 1182, probably in the Advent Ember days, and assigned the deaconry of Sant'Angelo in Pescheria. He signed a papal document for the first time on 3 January 1183.

In 1184, Cardinal Bobo was sent, along with Cardinal Soffredo, to France to attempt to arrange a peace between Henry II of England and Philip II of France. He was also apparently in England, according to a papal document of Pope Clement III of 12 February 1189, as papal legate, when he cooperated with King Henry II and Archbishop Baldwin of Canterbury in the restoration of the priory of Canterbury to the archbishop.

Cardinal Bobo did not participate in the papal election that took place in Verona on 25 November 1185, the day after Pope Lucius' death. He was still in northwestern Europe.

He subscribed documents for Pope Urban III in Verona on 19 April, 22 April, 8 May, 17 June, 26 June, 14 July, 26 July, 9 August, 11 August, 30 August, 20 September, 30 November, 10 December 1186; 7 January, 12 January 1187. His latest known subscription for Urban III is at Verona on 5 February 1187. Urban III continued the hostilities with the emperor, offering no concessions, and finally arriving at the decision to excommunicate him. He was deterred only by the urgent pleas of the people of Verona. Urban and the cardinals who were besieged with him were able to escape from Verona in the last weeks of September 1187, taking refuge in Ferrara. Urban died there on 20 October 1187.

On the following day, thirteen cardinals who had been present in Ferrara began the proceedings to elect his successor. It is not known whether Cardinal Bobo was present. The cardinals were aware that the papal chancellor, Albert di Morra, was in great favor with the Emperor Frederick Barbarossa, because he was a member of the imperial party in the curia, and because he reported to the emperor all the confidential activities of the Roman curia. On 21 October 1187, he was unanimously elected pope and took the name Gregory VIII. Cardinal Bobo did not subscribe any documents at all for Pope Gregory VIII during his brief reign of one month and twenty-seven days. This might be an accident of the survival of documents, or perhaps a policy disagreement between the two.

The cardinals unanimously elected Cardinal Paolo Scolari, bishop of Palestrina, on 19 December 1187, the Saturday after the Feast of S. Barbara. He took the name Clement III. Immediate arrangements were begun for a return to Rome. Without delay Pope Clement sent his legates to the Roman people, in order to formulate a firm peace between him and them. On 26 January 1188, Pope Clement was in Siena, and by 11 February 1188 he returned to Rome and was resident at the Lateran.

Cardinal Bobo, still deacon of S. Angelo in Pescheria, began subscribing for Pope Clement III at the Lateran in Rome on 11 March 1188.

Pope Clement promoted Cardinal Bobo cardinal priest of the titulus of Sant' Anastasia in 1188. Gaetano Moroni states that the pope also made Bobo his vicar of the city of Rome. Ciaconius states that the consistory for the promotion of cardinals took place in 1188 on 12 March. Bobo's earliest known subscription as a cardinal priest is apparently dated 28 March 1188. There are two papal bulls, however, each dated 5 April 1188, which contain the signature of Bobo, sancti Angeli diaconus cardinalis. Bobo, therefore, was promoted after 5 April 1188. He appears as cardinal priest of S. Anastasia in a bull signed at the Lateran on 6 May 1188. He also subscribed on 17 May, 29 May, 2 June, 21 June, 22 June, 14 October, 28 October, 4 November, 22 November, 29 November, 15 December 1188; 16 March, 20 April 1189.

He was promoted Bishop of Porto in spring 1189. He first subscribes as cardinal bishop on 18 May 1189. He also signed on 28 June 1189.

His latest known signature was on 12 September 1189. The earliest known subscription of his successor, Petrus Gallocia, is dated 20 August 1190.

== Sources ==
- Alphonsus Ciaconius (Chacón) (1677). Agostinus Olduinus (ed.). Vitae et res gestae pontificum romanorum: et S.R.E. cardinalium (in Latin). Vol. Tomus primus (2nd ed.). Roma: P. et A. De Rubeis. p. 1120.
- Jaffé, Philipp (1888). Regesta pontificum Romanorum ab condita Ecclesia ad annum post Christum natum MCXCVIII (in Latin). Vol. II. Leipzig.
- Kartusch, Elfriede (1948). Das Kardinalskollegium in der Zeit von 1181–1227 (in German). Wien.
- https://books.google.com/books?id=ZrQAAAAAMAAJ&dq=cardinale+bobone+orsini&pg=PA261
- Miranda, Salvador. "BOBONI, Andrea (?-ca. 1190)". The Cardinals of the Holy Roman Church. Florida International University. OCLC 53276621.
- Nicolaj, Giovanni (1968). "BOBONE". Treccani - Dizionario Biografico degli Italiani - Volume 10 (in Italian).
