= Melior (cardinal) =

Benedictine monk

Melior, O.S.B. Vall. (died c. 1197) was a Benedictine monk, and a cardinal of the Roman Catholic Church. He was a native of Pisa. He served as papal legate in France for more than three years, trying to arrange a peace between Richard I and Philip II. He became a major negotiator, on the mandate of Pope Celestine III, in the divorce case between King Philip II of France and Queen Ingeborg of Denmark.

== Early life ==
Melior was a monk, belonging to the Vallombrosian branch of the Benedictines.

He enjoyed the academic status of Magister. It is stated that he was archdeacon of Laon, based on a single reference to a Melior the archdeacon in a letter of Stephen of Tournai, abbot of S. Geneviève in Paris (1176–1192), to the archbishop of Reims.

=== Verona ===
Driven out of Rome by the Roman commune, due to the war over Tusculum, Pope Lucius III (1181–1185) fled to the Emperor Frederick Barbarossa, who was at Verona, expecting to receive assistance for Tusculum and against the Romans. Some of the cardinals followed Pope Lucius to Verona; others, however, whose followers had perpetrated the outrages at Tusculum and in the Roman campagna, remained in the city. Far from obtaining aid from the emperor Frederick Barbarossa, they fell into quarreling, and the papal court became prisoner of the emperor in Verona.

== Cardinal ==
Melior was named a cardinal by Pope Lucius III at Verona, on Ash Wednesday in 1184. He granted Melior the titular church of Ss. Giovanni e Paolo, and named him his chamberlain.

On 11 November 1185, two weeks before the pope's death, eighteen cardinals, including Melior, subscribed a bull in Verona in favor of the monastery of S. Peter Lobiensis. Lucius died in Verona on 25 November 1185, and the election of his successor took place immediately after the funeral on the same day. Cardinal Melior certainly participated in the election of a new pope, which was brief and unanimous. The successful candidate, was Humbertus Crivelli, the Archbishop of Milan and Cardinal of S. Lorenzo in Damaso, "a violent and unyielding spirit, and a strong opponent of Frederick (Barbarossa)," in the words of Ferdinand Gregorovius. He took the name Urban III. On 16 December 1185, Cardinal Melior subscribed a bull in Verona for Pope Urban. Shortly after 22 September 1187, Urban and the cardinals escaped from Verona, and by 3 October had found refuge in Ferrara. Cardinal Melior subscribed a bull in Ferrara on 13 October. There Urban died on 20 October.

His successor, Alberto di Morra, a friend of the emperor, brokered an agreement which might lead to a papal return to Rome, but Gregory VIII reigned for less than two months, having only been able to move from Ferrara to Pisa.

When he was in Pisa with the papal court, as the new pope, Clement III was about to return to Rome, on 13 January 1188, he subscribed a bull Ego Melior presbiter cardinalis sanctorum iohannis et pauli tit. pamachii.

On 1 March 1191, at Pisa, Cardinal Melior witnessed a charter of the new Holy Roman Emperor, Henry VI, for the benefit of Pisa. He signed himself magister Melior Cardinalis Massanae episcopus, a unique formula. However, the signature Massanae episcopus creates a problem. There already was a bishop of Massa Marittima, Bishop Martinus; he is attested in a document of 28 November 1189 and in a document of 17 November 1196. There is no room for Melior. Monaco glides over the problem by writing carefully, "He became bishop of Massa Marittima, only to be designated during the pontificate of Celestine III legate to France, a position he held from 1193 to 1197;" and Ganzer is sure that Melior later gave up the bishopric. Inspection of the original parchment, however, indicates that there is a space after the word "Cardinalis" and before the word "Massanae", leaving room for the name or initial of Martinus. Melior was not bishop of Massa Maritima at any time.

=== Rome ===
Cardinal Melior subscribed, Ego Melior SS. Joannis et Pauli presbyter cardinalis in a document signed at the Lateran on 27 December 1191.

On 23 April 1193, he subscribed a bull for Pope Celestine III at the Lateran; likewise on 15 May, 3 June, and 10 June.

=== France ===
In 1193, Queen Berengaria of England, the wife of Richard I, and Queen Joanna of Sicily, his sister, stopped in Rome on their way back from Cyprus and the Third Crusade. They hoped to avoid the attentions of the German Emperor, Henry VI, whose designs on Apulia and Sicily were about to lead to a war of conquest. They remained in Rome for half the year before daring to resume their journey to France. Pope Celestine placed them in the care of Cardinal Melior, his legate, who accompanied them to Pisa, Genoa, Marseille, and finally Poitiers.

At some point during his legateship, Cardinal Melior was approached by the archbishop of Reims, the king's uncle, in the hope of settling the centuries' old dispute between the bishop of Dol and the archbishop of Tours over the claim of Dol to metropolitan status over the dioceses of Brittany. The king and his principal subjects, the archbishop said, were bitter and likely to resort to violence over what they regarded as an insult to the dignity of Tours and the entire kingdom. Melior's response is not recorded. The matter was finally settled by Pope Innocent III in 1199, in favor of Tours.

In the same summer, on 14 August 1193, King Philip married Ingeborg of Denmark, the sister of King Canute VI. Philip was dissatisfied within a day, and sought an immediate annulment, claiming he had been bewitched by sorcery. He ordered an assembly of the notables of his kingdom at Compiègne on 4 November 1193, at which he presented a genealogy which claimed to show that Philip was related to Ingeborg within the prohibited degrees of kinship. The archbishop of Reims, the king's uncle, Cardinal Guillaume "aux blanches mains", pronounced the marriage uncanonical and dissolved. Ingeborg fled to a convent in Soissons and appealed the case to the pope. Pope Celestine was sufficiently disturbed that he quashed the divorce judgment, "contra ordinem juris prolatam," and sent his notary, the subdeacon Centius, as his legate, with letters for the king. He was annoyed at the reception of both his legate and his letters by the king.

On 23 July 1194, the Constable of France, Drogo de Merloto; Anselm, the Dean of S. Martin in Tours; and Ursio, the royal French Chamberlain; announced the agreement of yet another truce between the perpetually warring houses of Plantagenet and Capet. It was achieved through the pleas of the cardinal and the abbot of Cîteux. If there was any disagreement between the contracting parties, the Cardinal Legate Magister Melior would inquire into the truth of things, and if the offender did not correct his violation, the legate would pronounce the sentence of excommunication and lay the territory under the interdict.

In 1195, Andreas, the chancellor of the king of Denmark, led an embassy to Rome to fully brief Pope Celestine on the Ingeborg case. On his return journey, he was entrusted by the pope with letters for Cardinal Melior. When they arrived at Dijon, however, they were imprisoned by agents of the duke of Burgundy, Eudes III. They were released by intervention of the abbot of Cîteux, and taken to Clairvaux, where they were to await the pleasure of the king of France. In the meantime they were able to send on the pope's letters to the legate.

In a later letter, written by the chancellor Andreas to Archbishop Absalon of Lund in 1196, he recapitulates his troubles of the previous year, and adds that, on 7 April 1196, the archbishop of Sens, the bishop of Arras, the abbots of Cîteux and of Clairvaux, and Magister Petrus the precentor of Paris, were to act as judges delegate of the pope and examine the case of Philip and Ingeborg; they were to induce the king to take back the queen. If they were to fail, then on the second Sunday after Easter, 5 May 1196, Cardinal Melior, on the mandate of the pope, was to assemble a council of the archbishops of Reims, Sens, and Tours, and the bishop of Bourges and their suffragans, along with the papal notary, were to induce the king to take back his wife. At some point after August, Ingeborg wrote to the pope, complaining that the cardinals, the legates, the archbishops, and the bishops had failed.

In June 1196, King Philip compounded his sins, crimes and errors by attempting another marriage, with Agnes of Merania, daughter of Berthold, Duke of Merania.

=== Rome ===
Melior subscribed a papal bull, along with the datary Cardinal Cencius, at the Lateran on 9 February 1197. This is his last known act. He died before 11 June 1197.

== Sources ==
- Ciaconius (Chacón), Alphonsus (1677). Agustinus Olduinus (ed.). Vitae et res gestae pontificum romanorum: et S.R.E. cardinalium (in Latin). Vol. I (2nd ed.). Roma: P. et A. De Rubeis. pp. 1118–1119.
- Ganzer, Klaus (1963). Die Entwicklung des auswartigen Kardinalats im Hohen Mittelalter: ein Beitrag zur Geschichte des Kardinalkollegiums von 11. bis 13. Jahrhunderts. (in German) Tübingen 1963.
- Jaffé, Philipp (1888). Regesta pontificum Romanorum ab condita Ecclesia ad annum post Christum natum MCXCVIII (in Latin). Vol. II. Leipzig.
- Kartusch, Elfriede (1948). Das Kardinalskollegium in der Zeit von 1181–1227 (in German). Wien.
- Monaco, Francesca Roversi (2010). "Migliore." Dizionario Biografico degli Italiani Volume 74 (Treccani 2010).
- Watterich, J. B. M. (1862). Pontificum Romanorum qui fuerunt inde ab exeunte saeculo IX usque ad finem saeculi XIII vitae: ab aequalibus conscriptae (in Latin). Vol. Tomus II. Leipzig: G. Engelmann.
