= Pietro Diani =

Italian Catholic cardinal

Cardinal Petrus Diani
- Cardinal-Priest
- Church: San Nicola in Carcere (1185-1188); Santa Cecilia in Trastevere (1188-after 1206)
- Elected: 11 March 1179

Orders
- Consecration: 6 May 1179 by Pope Alexander III
- Created cardinal: March 1185 by Pope Lucius III
- Rank: Cardinal Deacon, then Cardinal Priest

Personal details
- Born: mid-12th cent. Piacenza
- Died: after November 1206
- Residence: Rome, Verona
- Occupation: diplomat, administrator, courtier papal legate (Lombardy) (1188-1193) papal legate to emperor (1195-1196)
- Profession: priest
- Education: held title "Magister"

Pietro Diani (died 1208, Rome) was an Italian cardinal. The name "Diana" is incorrect; he signs himself Petrus Dianus.

== Life ==
Petrus Diani was born in Piacenza around the middle of the 12th century.

He is first noticed as a papal subdeacon in 1172. He became a canon of the collegiate church of Sant'Antonino a Piacenza by 1173, when a letter of Pope Alexander III notes his refusal to absolve the citizens of Piacenza who were guilty of attacking, wounding, and imprisoning Magister Petrus, Canon of S. Antonio and papal subdeacon. Petrus was elected its provost by 1178. He and Bishop Tedaldo of Piacenza disputed for a number of years over the possession of Brugneto, and he appeared by proxy before an examination committee of cardinals. He retained the post of provost even after he became a cardinal.

=== Exile in Verona, Ferrara, and Pisa ===
Pope Lucius III appointed Petrus cardinal deacon of San Nicola in Carcere in the consistory of the Ember Days of March 1185. The consistory was held in Verona, where Lucius and the papal curia were being besieged by the Emperor Frederick Barbarossa, with whom the pope had had a serious falling out. Cardinal Pietro's earliest surviving subscription to a papal document is on 4 April 1185 at Verona. When Lucius died in Verona on 25 November 1185, Pietro took part in the papal election of 1185. After twenty months as a virtual prisoner in Verona, the new pope, Urban III (Umberto Crivelli) escaped with the cardinals in the second half of September 1187, and made for Ferrara. There Urban III died, on 20 October 1187. Pietro Diano took part in the papal election of October 1187 in Ferrara. This time imperial and Roman agents were at work, and, on 21 October 1187, the cardinals elected Cardinal Alberto de Morra, the papal chancellor, who was the leader of the imperial party in the college of cardinals. Expectations were high for cooperation between the empire and the papacy, but Gregory VIII, as Alberto had chosen to call himself, died at Pisa during his journey toward Rome, on 17 December 1187, Pietro participated in his third papal election in a little over two years, which elected Cardinal Pietro Scolari on 19 December. He became Pope Clement III. Clement and the papal court, including Pietro Diano, finally reached Rome in the first week of February 1188. Petrus' latest subscription as cardinal deacon of San Nicola in Carcere was on 17 March 1188.

During the Ember Days of Lent 1188, Clement III made Petrus Dianus a cardinal priest, with the titulus of Santa Cecilia in Trastevere. His earliest subscription as a cardinal priest came on 18 March 1188.

=== Legate in Lombardy ===
During his brief pontificate in the last quarter of 1187, Pope Gregory VIII, though shaken by the loss of Jerusalem to Saladin and the near-collapse of the Latin Church in the Holy Land, had already begun to work toward bringing aid to the Crusaders. In his last week, in Pisa, he began work to bring Pisa and Genoa to the peace table. His effort was instantly taken up by Pope Clement III, who, in February 1188, ordered the Pisatans and the Genoans each to choose representatives to negotiate and swear their oaths. He appointed Cardinal Petrus as his papal legate in Lombardy along with Cardinal Soffredo of Santa Maria in Via lata, with the urgent charge to accomplish the peace between Genoa and Pisa, whose ships would be needed to bring aid to the crusade. On 19 May, the pope instructed the parties to obey the points which he had conveyed through his legates. On 7 July, the legates, sitting in Lucca, were able to announce that the two parties had agreed a peace between them, which was confirmed by themselves on the authority of Clement III. Clement himself formally ratified the treaty on 12 December 1188. Cardinal Soffredo returned to Rome by the following May, and was appointed legate to Germany in June 1189.

In April 1189, Cardinal Petrus was in Padua, where he appointed Bishop Stephen of Ferrara to handle a case between an abbess and a prior. In July 1189, he was in Milan, where he authorized the transfer of remains of saints from Brescia.

Cardinal Petrus Diani continued to carry out his legantine duties in Lombardy until May 1193, with brief trips to Rome in 1190 and 1191. He was in Rome on 7 December 1190, when he subscribed a papal decree in the dispute between San Benedetto Po and the monastery of Nonantola.

Pope Clement III died in March 1191. Petrus of S. Cecilia took part in the papal election of 1191, which elected Cardinal Giacinto Bobo to succeed him as Pope Celestine III.

=== Negotiations with the emperor ===
On 31 March 1195, the Emperor Henry VI, wishing to be agreeable to the pope in order to obtain papal approval for his possession of the Kingdom of Sicily, a papal fief, agreed to take the cross as a crusader. In response, on 27 April, Pope Celestine sent two cardinals to meet the emperor, who was in the Marches at the moment, to preach the crusade, Petrus of Santa Cecilia and Graziano of Ss. Cosma e Damiano. In August, Petrus and Cardinal Giovanni of S. Stefano were invited to Germany to preach the crusade; his work carried him to Worms and into Saxony. Petrus travelled with the emperor, signing diplomas on 21 January 1196, 28 July 1196, 9 August 1196, and 9 September 1196. He returned to Italy with the emperor's retinue; the emperor was in Milan by 12 August 1196.

He was also said to have been papal legate in Sicily under Pope Celestine III in 1197. The evidence is indirect. On 10 January 1197, the Emperor Henry was at Bari, to see the crusader fleet off for the Holy Land. On 10 February, he was in Taranto, from which he had sent a letter urging the sending of Cardinals Petrus Diani and Graziano to him. He then travelled to Messina, and in March he was in Palermo. He returned to Messina by 25 September. Maleczek noticed that between 15 June 1197 and 17 October 1197, neither cardinal subscribed any papal documents, which he takes as evidence that they were in Sicily.

Henry VI died in Messina on 28 September 1197.

=== Curia cardinal ===
Cardinal Petrus of S. Cecilia took part in the papal election of 1198. Pope Celestine had died on 8 January 1198, and after his funeral on the same day, the cardinals elected Lothar dei Conti, who chose the name Innocent III.

In the second half of 1198, Pope Innocent sent Cardinals Petrus Diani and Cardinal Graziano of Ss. Cosma e Damiano to Pisa and Genoa, to obtain a renewal of the treaty of peace between the two cities which they had negotiated in 1188.

Cardinal Petrus regularly served as auditor causarum (judge) in the papal curia. Kartusch provides a list of at least seventeen cases in which he played a role. Malaczek points out that many of them were referred from places where Petrus had been papal legate.

On 18 November 1203, Pope Innocent III promoted the bishop of Bobbio to the important post of archbishop of Genoa. He sent the new archbishop the pallium of his office through Cardinal Petrus of S. Cecilia.

He subscribed a papal bull on 2 November 1206, and it is said that he also signed one on 25 July 1208, though the latter has been disputed. The next cardinal priest of S. Cecilia was appointed in 1210.

== Sources ==
- Campi, Pietro Maria (1651), Dell' historia ecclesiastica di Piacenza (in Italian), Volume 2 (Piacenza: G. Bazachi).
- Jaffé, Philipp (1888). Regesta pontificum Romanorum ab condita Ecclesia ad annum post Christum natum MCXCVIII. Vol. II. Leipzig.
- Kartusch, Elfriede (1948). Das Kardinalskollegium in der Zeit von 1181–1227. Wien: Max Niemeyer, pp. 347–355.
- Watterich, J. B. M. (1862). Pontificum Romanorum qui fuerunt inde ab exeunte saeculo IX usque ad finem saeculi XIII vitae: ab aequalibus conscriptae (in Latin). Vol. Tomus II. Leipzig: G. Engelmann.

=== External links ===
- Maleczek, Werner (1991). "DIANI, Pietro." (in Italian) Dizionario Biografico degli Italiani Volume 39 (1991).
- Miranda, Salvador. "DIANA, Pietro (?-1208)". The Cardinals of the Holy Roman Church. Florida International University. OCLC 53276621.
