= 1187 papal election =

1187 papal election may refer to:

- October 1187 papal election, which elected Gregory VIII to succeed Urban III
- December 1187 papal election, which elected Clement III to succeed Gregory VIII
