= Ottaviano di Paoli =

Italian Roman Catholic Cardinal

Ordination history of Ottaviano di Paoli
History
Diaconal ordination
- Date: 1178
Episcopal consecration
- Consecrated by: Pope Innocent III
Cardinalate
- Elevated by: Pope Lucius III
- Date: February 1182
Episcopal succession
Bishops consecrated by Ottaviano di Paoli as principal consecrator
- Giacinto Bobone (Pope Celestine III): 14 April 1191
- Lotario dei Conti di Segni (Pope Innocent III): 22 February 1198

Ottaviano di Poli (surname given variously) (died 1206), a member of the family of the Counts of Poli, was an Italian Roman Catholic Cardinal.

While still a subdeacon, he was sent as a papal legate to France by Pope Alexander III in 1178, to summon the French bishops to a general council which met in Rome in March 1179.

He was created cardinal in December 1182 at Velletri, in the first creation of cardinals by Pope Lucius III. He was appointed cardinal-deacon of Ss. Sergio e Bacco. He subscribed the papal bulls between 2 January 1183 and 8 November 1205.

In 1186, Pope Urban III reversed the policy of his predecessors, to deny the repeated requests of King Henry II of England to have his son John crowned king of Ireland with papal blessing. Pope Urban named Cardinal Ottaviano as legate to Henry II of England, along with Hugh de Nunant. They did not arrive at the English court until after Christmas. Their mission was to crown John Lackland as King of Ireland. By parading their legantine symbols both at Canterbury and at the royal court, the legates offended Archbishop Baldwin and his suffragans, which made a coronation in Baldwin's province impossible. John was sent instead to Normandy, and on 17 February 1187, the king and the papal legates also crossed to Normandy. John was never crowned.

Ottaviano was also legate in Umbria.

He participated in the papal elections of October 1187, and in the papal election of December 1187.

He was promoted Cardinal-bishop of Ostia in Rome, on Ash Wednesday in March 1189, by Pope Clement III.

Bishop Ottaviano took part in the papal election of 1191. As Bishop of Ostia, he consecrated Pope Celestine III a bishop on 14 April 1191.

In 1192, he was sent to Normandy along with Cardinal Giordano da Ceccano of Fossanova, to attempt to resolve the conflict in Normandy between the archbishop of Rouen and the Bishop of Ely, the Chancellor of King Richard. The legates were denied entry into Normandy by Guillaume the Seneschal, whom they excommunicated; Normandy was placed under interdict.

He participated in the papal election of January 1198. In 1198, Bishop Ottaviano was appointed by Pope Innocent III to receive the oath of fealty of Constance, Queen of Sicily, on her own behalf and on behalf of her three-year-old son Frederick. He was also appointed to obtain the oath of fealty of Conrad of Spoleto, and that of Markward von Annweiler, the Margrave of Ancona and Count of the Abruzzo, both loyal followers of King Henry. In the latter case, following the death of Henry VI in September 1197 and of the empress Constance in December 1198, Markward swore his feudal oath before Cardinal Cinzio Cenci of San Lorenzo in Lucina and Giovanni di San Paolo of Santa Prisca, but he violated it almost immediately and brought devastation on nearly the whole of the March of Ancona. When he and many of his followers were excommunicated by Innocent III, he sought pardon and absolution, and appeared personally before a commission of cardinals, Bishop Ottaviano of Ostia, Guido Papareschi of Santa Maria Transtiberim, and Ugolino dei Conti di Segni of San Eustachio, who absolved him and received his oath again. When he returned to his aggression against the territory of the young Frederick, he was again excommunicated by Innocent III.

He became prior episcoporum in October 1200.

In July 1200, Cardinal Ottaviano was appointed papal legate of Pope Innocent III to Philip II, King of France. His mission was to separate the king from his mistress and restore the position of Queen Ingeborg. He was complimented in letters by several high-ranking French prelates to Pope Innocent, praising his indirect, calm, and gentle methods. He wrote a report to the pope, which survives, as does the pope's reply with additional instructions. Though King Philip wrote directly to the pope, outlining his case for a divorce from Ingeborg, Innocent III firmly rejected his arguments and the idea of a divorce, and ordered him to obey the mandates of the legate. Philip's resolution to follow the legate's instruction lasted only a short time, and his rejection of Ingeborg continued until her death. During his mission, Ottaviano was also instructed to do what he could to improve the relations between King Philip and King John of England. He received a mandate to restore the dean of Nevers to his position, since he had purged himself of the suspicion of heresy. At the end of December 1200, he was given the power to dissolve any compacts entered into by either Philip or John, which might obstruct their friendship. On 26 January 1201, Ottaviano was given the authority to regularize the situation of Bishop William of Bourges, who had had himself consecrated a bishop despite the interdict in force in France. In May or June 1201, he had a similar mandate concerning the bishop of Meaux. On 1 March 1201, Pope Innocent III wrote both to King Philip and the legate Ottaviano about the succession to the imperial throne and the pope's rejection of Philip's candidacy. In July 1201, Pope Innocent was still instructing Ottaviano to restore Ingeborg, get rid of the concubine, and get Philip to pay his promised subsidy for the Holy Land.

By May 1202, Cardinal Ottaviano was back in Rome and working in the curia. He sat on an investigating committee of cardinals, which pronounced on the case of the archdeacon of Verona; their judgment was confirmed by Pope Innocent III on 10 May 1202.

Ottaviano di Poli died on 5 April 1206.

== Sources ==
- Chacon, Alfonso (1677). Olduin, Augustinus (ed.). Vitae et res gestae Pontificum romanorum et S.R.E. Cardinalium: ab initio nascentis ecclesiae vsque ad Clementem IX P.O.M. (2nd ed.). Rome: Philippi et Ant. De Rubeis. pp. 1115–1116.
- Gregorovius, Ferdinand (1906), History of the City of Rome in the Middle Ages. Volume 5, Issue 1. second edition, revised (London: Bell).
- Jaffé, Philipp (1888). Loewenfeld, S. (ed.). Regesta pontificum Romanorum ab condita Ecclesia ad annum post Christum natum MCXCVIII (in Latin). Vol. II (2nd ed.). Leipzig.

Catholic Church titles
Preceded by Thibaud of Ostia	Cardinal-bishop of Ostia; 1189–1206	Succeeded by Ugolino di Conti
