= Audita tremendi =

Audita tremendi is an encyclical first issued by Pope Gregory VIII on 29 October 1187, calling for what came to be known as the Third Crusade.

== Background ==
Following the death of Pope Urban III on 20 October 1187, which was reportedly due to his hearing of Saladin's victory at the Battle of Hattin, the newly elected Pope Gregory VIII convened with his advisors to draft an encyclical calling for another Holy Land crusade. Some historians, however, have speculated that much if not all of what would become Audita tremendi had already been prepared by Urban himself before his death.

In any case, the encyclical was first issued on 29 October 1187 and read aloud at the papal court in Ferrara. Gregory subsequently put the cardinal bishop of Albano, Henry, in charge of preaching the crusade in France and Germany. The pope reissued Audita tremendi with some modifications on 30 October and 3 November, whereas a fourth version of the text was sent out by Gregory's successor Clement III on 2 January 1188.

== Content ==
Gregory addresses "all of the faithful of Christ" in Audita tremendi. In his letter, which begins with the words "Audita tremendi...", Gregory laments the Christian defeat in the Battle of Hattin on 4 July 1187, which was accompanied by the execution of the Hospitallers and the Templars and the loss of the True Cross. He argues that Muslims are to be seen as pagans, not Christian heretics, because, in his view, they worship a different God than the Christians and Jews.

However, Gregory also attributes the Christians' recent misfortunes to the "iniquity" of the "delinquent" Crusader states. He asserts that all Christians are thus obliged to participate in another crusade as a form of penance, so as to "placate" God, who would otherwise have chosen to recapture the Holy Land on his own "if he so wished". Moreover, Jesus Christ "taught by his own example that men should lay down their lives for their brothers."

Gregory ends by promising an indulgence to all crusaders, as well as granting them immunity against legal suits and exempting them from interest on their loans.

== Legacy ==
Thomas W. Smith noted that it "has long been considered the pinnacle of twelfth-century papal letters." Penny J. Cole described Audita tremendi as "perhaps the most emotive of all papal bulls", while Jonathan Phillips called it "the most powerful and emotive crusade bull of all". According to Jessalynn Bird, Edward Peters, and James M. Powell, Audita tremendi "inspired a new generation of moral theologians to consider the needs of the Holy Land and to link these to the moral regeneration of Christian Europe, one of the great themes of twelfth- and thirteenth-century history."

== See also ==
- List of papal bulls
