= Uberto Allucingoli =

Italian cardinal and cardinal-nephew of Pope Lucius III

Uberto Allucingoli was an Italian cardinal and cardinal-nephew of Pope Lucius III, his uncle who ostensibly elevated him with the title of San Lorenzo in Damaso in 1182.

Modern scholars consider him a fictitious individual who owes his existence to a confusion with Uberto Crivelli, who was created cardinal-priest of San Lorenzo in Damaso in December 1182 and then became Pope Urban III (1185–1187).
