= Liber Censuum =

Record of the real estate venues of the papacy from 492 to 1192

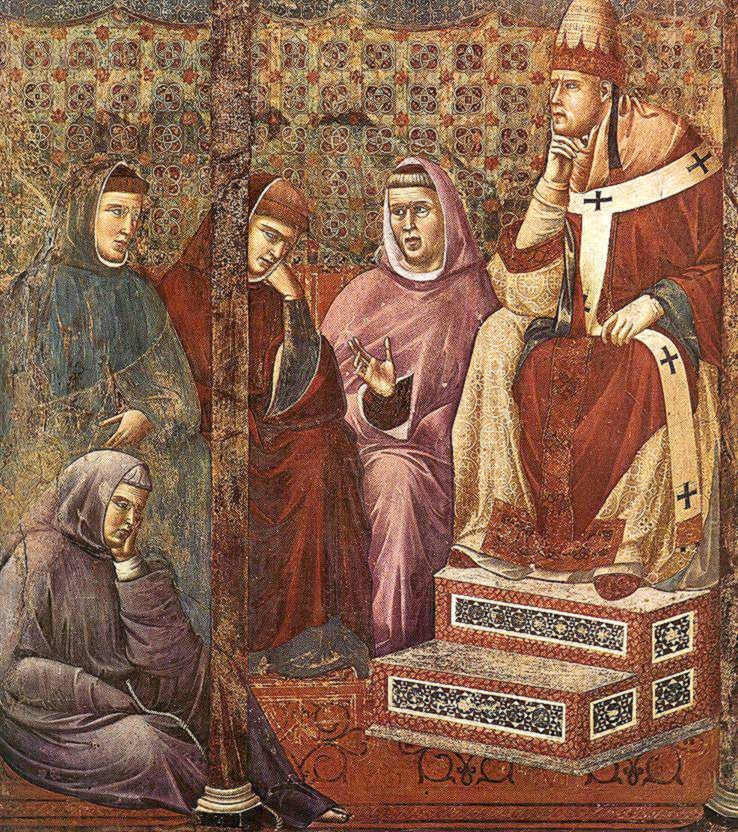
Cardinal Cencius (future Pope Honorius III), the author of the Liber Censuum; portrait by Giotto

The Liber Censuum Romanæ Ecclesiæ (Latin for "Census Book of the Roman Church"; also referred to as the Codex of Cencius) is an eighteen-volume (originally) financial record of the real estate revenues of the papacy from 492 to 1192. The span of the record includes the creation of the Apostolic Camera and the effects of the Gregorian Reform. The work constitutes the "latest and most authoritative of a series of attempts, starting in the eleventh century, to keep an accurate record of the financial claims of the Roman church". According to historian J. Rousset de Pina, the book was "the most effective instrument and [...] the most significant document of ecclesiastical centralization" in the central Middle Ages.

Michael Ott considers the Liber Censuum "perhaps the most valuable source for the history of papal economics during the Middle Ages".

== History ==
The document has its roots in the Polyptych of Pope Gelasius I, created at the end of the 5th century and continued for the next four centuries. The Liber Censuum proper was assembled in 1192 by Cencius Camerarius (future Pope Honorius III), papal chamberlain to Pope Clement III and Pope Celestine III, and his assistant, William Rofio, the clerk of the papal camera. The document compiled information contained in the Collectio canonum of Cardinal Deusdedit (1087), the Liber politicus of Benedict, Canon of St. Peter (c. 1140), dossiers of the former chamberlain Boson (1149–1178), and the Gesta pauperis scolaris of Cardinal Albinus (1188). Albinus' Gesta was the "most ambitious" of the Liber Censuum predecessor records, containing—according to Albinus—"whatever I knew or found in books of antiquities or what I myself heard and saw concerning the rights of St. Peter". The Liber Censuum also incorporates information from a contemporary general census and rent table of church properties organized by diocese, the Ordo romanus (a description of religious ceremonies), as it pertains to the distribution of payments to the curia during such ceremonies, and works of pontifical history such as the Liber pontificalis.

The earliest documentary evidence for the use of such a document of papal property rights goes back even earlier to an 1163/1164 letter from Pope Alexander III to the abbot of Lagny-sur-Marne requesting an annual payment of one ounce of gold, owed according to "a certain work among the books of the apostolic see". Although this specific claim dated to the time of Pope Urban II, the abbot rejected it and there is no evidence Alexander III pursued it further. Such incidences are likely what Cencius refers to in the preface of the Liber Censuum as the "no little damage and loss" incurred by the church as a result of earlier records being "incomplete and neither written nor arranged authentically". Furthermore, the Liber Censuum was compiled at a time when the papal patrimony was threatened by the Staufen emperor and individual payments from sources throughout the continent were being reduced by the evasiveness of payers and the inefficiency of the apostolic camera.

== Contents ==
The eighteen volumes of the Liber Censuum are divided between: census and rent tables (vol. 1–7), lists of bishoprics and monasteries directly administered by the Holy See (vol. 8), the Mirabilia, a mythical description of the city of Rome (vol. 9), a version of the Ordo romanus (vol. 10–11), pontifical chronicles (vol. 12–13), and a chartulary (vol. 14–18).

The dating of the Liber Censuum to 1192 comports with the date given in the work's prologue, although this date may only be accurate for the record of taxes owed to the Holy See. For example, the Vita Gregorii IX was inserted into the codex of the Liber Censuum between 1254 and 1265, likely during the tenure of Pope Gregory IX's nephew Niccolò as camerarius between 1255 and 1261.

The original version of the Liber Censuum by Cardinal Cencius begins:

Incipit liber censuum Rom. Eccl. a Centio Camerario compositus, secundum antiquorum patrum Regesta et memorialia diversa. A. incarn. dni MCXCII. Pont. Celestini Pp. III. A. II.

The Liber Censuum described itself as an authoritative list of "those monasteries, hospitals [...] cities, castles, manors [...] or those kings and princes belonging to the jurisdiction and property of St. Peter and the holy Roman church and owing census and how much they ought to pay".

The census list included churches, abbeys and bishoprics, as well as some original receipts or payment records.

The value of the rights recorded in the Liber Censuum is difficult to quantify exactly, and in any case, unlikely to have been paid in full. V. Pfaff, estimating historical exchange rates, assessed the value of the revenue cited in the Liber Censuum as 1,214 gold ounces, a sum that would comprise less than 5% of Richard I of England's annual income. The Liber Censuum, however, does not include several sources of papal revenue, in particular those collected in-kind and the revenues of the Basilicas of Rome.

== Later editions and legacy ==
Papal historians regard the Liber Censuum as well-organized compared to the works which preceded it, and it includes empty spaces for anticipated updating. The intent was to allow future camerarii to add future entries "until the end of the world". The original version of the Liber Censuum was identified by Paul Fabre in the Vatican Library (ms Vat. Lat. 8486), with its blank spaces having been exhausted during the pontificate of Cencius (who was elected Pope Honorius III) and five new volumes having been added to the beginning and end of the document. A new version of the Liber Censuum was compiled by Cardinal Nicholas Roselli (d. 1362) in the 14th century.

A 1228 version of the Liber censuum in the library of Florence (ms Riccard. 228) was updated through the Avignon Papacy. By the end of the 13th century the addition of the dossiers of the cities of the Papal States and other papal biographies swelled the document to thirty-three volumes. A copy of the Liber censuum, along with a tiara, was given by Antipope Clement VIII to the legate of Pope Martin V in 1429 as a sign of submission.

Modern, edited versions of the Liber Censuum, reconstructed as their editors thought the original codex of Cencius would have appeared, have been produced by Fabre and Louis Duchesne (1910). Fabre's identification of other portions of the Liber Censuum, for example the alleged acquiescence of King Harthacanute to ecclesiastical taxation, are more controversial.

== Sources ==
- Andrews, Frances, Bolton, Brenda, Egger, Christopher, and Rousseau, Constance M. 2004. Pope, Church and City: Essays in Honour of Brenda M. Bolton. BRILL. ISBN 90-04-14019-0.
- Boespflug, Thérèse. Phillipe Levillain (ed.). 2002. The Papacy: An Encyclopedia. Routledge. ISBN 0-415-92228-3.
- Bolton, Brenda, and Duggan, Anne. 2003. Adrian IV, the English Pope, 1154-1159: Studies and Texts. Ashgate Publishing, Ltd. ISBN 0-7546-0708-9.
- Gregorovius, Ferdinand. 1896. History of the City of Rome in the Middle Ages. G. Bell & sons.
- Morris, Colin. 1991. The Papal Monarchy: The Western Church from 1050 to 1250. Oxford University Press. ISBN 0-19-826925-0.
- Reynolds, Roger Edward, Cushing, Kathleen G., and Gyug, Richard. 2002. Ritual, Text, and Law. Ashgate Publishing, Ltd. ISBN 0-7546-3869-3.
- Robinson, Ian Stuart. 1990. The Papacy, 1073-1198: Continuity and Innovation. Cambridge University Press. ISBN 0-521-31922-6.
