= Pandulf Masca =

Pandulf Masca or Pandolfo Masca is a name of Pisan origin often used erroneously to refer to:

- Pandolfo da Lucca (died ?1210), cardinal from 1182
- Pandulf Verraccio (died 1226), papal legate to England
