= Albinus (cardinal) =

Italian Cardinal

Cardinal Albinus
- Cardinal-Bishop
- Church: Santa Maria Nuova (1182-1185); Santa Croce in Gerusalemme (1185-1189)
- Diocese: Albano (1189-1197)

Orders
- Created cardinal: December 1182 by Pope Lucius III
- Rank: Cardinal Deacon, then Cardinal Priest, then Cardinal Bishop

Personal details
- Born: Milan
- Died: 1197 Rome (?)
- Residence: Rome, Verona
- Parents: Count Bianchino di Prata; Iselgarda di Carrara
- Occupation: diplomat, administrator, courtier, papal vicar of Rome
- Profession: bishop
- Education: individual schooling

Albinus (died 1197) was an Italian Cardinal of the late twelfth century. A native of Milan, or perhaps of Gaeta, he became an Augustinian regular canon.

== Early life ==
Albinus was orphaned at a young age, and taken in by an uncle, who was a monk, and who acted as both father and mother, instructing him in religious piety, as long as he lived. At some point, he became a Canon Regular at Santa Maria de Crescenzago in the diocese of Milan. He then left his homeland, in gente alia. He then passed under the supervision of his brother Richard, at the time as impoverished as he, who much later became bishop of Orvieto (1177–1201), studying the liberal arts. In order to pay his living expenses, Albinus had to undertake teaching duties. He then progressed to the study of philosophy, and also canon law, researching material from the Fathers and from Gratian. He gave extensive energy to the study of theology, and was well acquainted with the Sentences of Peter Lombard. In a document of 29 June 1186, Pope Urban III refers to Cardinal Albinus as "Magister".

When he had become a 'vir', he was called to Rome, and in the second year of Pope Lucius he was ordained a deacon in 1182, before 23 December, the date of his earliest signature as cardinal-deacon; and in the fourth year of the same pope, March 1185, he was ordained a priest.

He was created cardinal-deacon of Santa Maria Nuova by Pope Lucius III, in a consistory held at Velletri, during the Ember Days of December 1182. He first signs his name (subscribes) to a papal document on 23 December 1182.

== Tusculum ==
Pope Alexander III died in exile at Cività Castellana on 30 August 1181. As his body was being brought back to Rome for burial, it was stoned by the citizens of Rome, and only with difficulty was permission granted for it to be buried at the Lateran. His successor, Lucius III, was elected on 1 September 1181, but had to be consecrated and enthroned at Velletri, due to the hostility of the Romans. He was only allowed back to Rome at the end of October, but in mid-March 1182, having refused to grant the consuetudines conceded by earlier popes, he was forced to retreat to Velletri. In the meantime, refugees from Tusculum, which had been destroyed earlier in the century by the Roman commune, began to rebuild their fortifications. Annoyed by the challenge, the Roman commune reopened the war. Pope Lucius took the part of the Tusculans, but as the Romans had one success after another, he called for aid from the imperial Vicar in Italy, Archbishop Christian of Mainz. Christian managed to drive the Romans back, but soon died of a fever at Tusculum. The Romans renewed their offensive, devastated the territory of Tusculum in April 1184, and then turned their wrath against Latium. The pope then fled to the Emperor Frederick, who was at Verona, from Veroli to Sora, then to Ancona, Rimini, Faenza, and Modena.

The Romans, in a triumphal demonstration of their anticlericalism and their attitude to the papacy, took twenty-six clerics whom their soldiers had captured in Latium and blinded all but one. Each had a paper mitre fixed on his head and was mounted on an ass. Around the neck of each was fastened a placard, reading (for example), "This is the cardinal of S. Giorgio ad velum aureum." The one who had not been blinded was designated "The Pope", and he was sent to lead the 'cardinals' to Pope Lucius. Some of the real cardinals followed Pope Lucius to Verona, among them Cardinal Albinus of Santa Maria Nova; others, however, whose followers had perpetrated the outrages, remained in the city.

== Verona ==
Albinus was one of the cardinals who travelled north with Pope Lucius III to meet with the Emperor Frederick Barbarossa. He was one of ten cardinals who participated, along with the pope, in the consecration of the cathedral of Modena on 14 July 1184. On 27 February 1185, at Verona, he subscribed a bull as cardinal-deacon in favor of the church of S. Maria in Ratisbon. He was with the pope at Verona when he was promoted cardinal-priest with the title of Santa Croce in Gerusalemme in 1185, between 15 March 1185 and 19 March 1185. On 11 November 1185, two weeks before the pope's death he and his seventeen colleagues subscribed a bull in favor of the monastery of S. Peter Lobiensis. Lucius died on 25 November 1185, and the election of his successor took place immediately after the funeral on the same day. Cardinal Albinus certainly participated in the election of a new pope, which was brief and unanimous. The successful candidate, was Humbertus Crivelli, the Archbishop of Milan and Cardinal of S. Lorenzo in Damaso, " a violent and unyielding spirit, and a strong opponent of Frederick (Barbarossa)," in the words of Ferdinand Gregorovius. He took the name Urban III.

Urban III continued and intensified the anti-imperial policies of Lucius III. Cardinal Albinus, still in Verona, continued to subscribe documents. On 16 December 1185, his name appeared on a bull confirming the privileges and properties of the priory of S. Peter de Consiaco in the diocese of Soissons, and on another for the Cluniac priory of S. Maria Montisdesiderii in Amiens. On 11 January 1186, at Verona, he subscribed a bull in favor of the monastery of Sancta Trinitas in Lucerna, and, on 20 January, another for the monastery of S. Sixtus in Piacenza. On 27 January, he subscribed for S. Maria de Reno. On 30 August 1186, he is one of eighteen cardinals who signed a bull for the monastery of S. Maria de Sitanstein; on 20 September, he subscribed a privilege for the abbess and nuns of S. Maria in Bergamo. On 24 October 1186, Albinus subscribed his latest known bull for Pope Urban III in Verona. In September 1187, Pope Urban was able to make his escape from the imperial blockade of Verona, and flee to Ferrara, where he died on 20 October 1187.

== Rome ==
Pope Clement III was elected in Pisa, on 19 December 1187. He left Pisa in the last week of January, and reached Rome on 11 February 1188. Teresa Montecchi Palazzi makes the argument that Cardinal Albinus was already in Rome, serving as the papal vicar of the city of Rome, a mark of the pope's confidence in him.

He was an important figure of the papal curia. In the summer of 1188, he and Cardinal Petrus of S. Lorenzo in Damaso were appointed by Pope Clement III as papal legates to King William II of Sicily, with the mission of resolving difficulties between the curia and the king. King William renewed his oath of fealty to the papacy through the cardinals.

He was Bishop of Albano from 1189 to 1197.

Pope Celestine III (1191–1198) appointed him, along with Cardinal Gregory Galgano of Santa Maria in Porticu, as auditors (judges) in a controversy over the ordination of canons in the Church of Narni. In politics, he was on good terms with Tancred of Lecce On 7 July 1191, Cardinal Albinus was in Messenia, acting as the vicar of Pope Celestine III; at his request, the King Tancred of Sicily reduced the obligation of the city of Gaeta to send him two galleys for his service, to the obligation to send one.

On 26 May 1196, Cardinal Albinus took part in the consecration of the church of San Lorenzo in Lucina.

His latest subscription to a papal document is dated 9 July 1196, and in March 1198, Pope Innocent III mentioned that he was dead.

He was the author of the Gesta pauperis scolaris, a source of the Liber Censuum.

== Sources ==
- Blumenthal, Uta-Renate,"Cardinal Albinus of Albano and the Digesta pauperis scolaris Albini: Codex Ottob. lat. 3057." Archivum Historiae Pontificiae (1978): 82–98.
- Fabre, Paul, Étude sur le Libre Censuum de l' Église romain (in French) (Paris: E. Thorin 1892), pp. 10–20.
- Fabre, Paul and Duchesne, Louis. Le «Liber censuum» de l'Église romaine, (in Latin) (in French) Tome II, fascicule 5 (Paris: A. Fontemoing 1905), pp. 87–137.
- Gregorovius, Ferdinand (1896). The History of Rome in the Middle Ages Vol. IV, part 2. London: George Bell 1896.
- Kartusch, Elfriede (1948). Das Kardinalskollegium in der Zeit von 1181-1227: ein Beitrag zur Geschichte des Kardinalates im Mittelalter. (in German) Dissertation: Thesis (doctoral)--Universität Wien, 1948, pp. 79–82
- Montecchi Palazzi, Teresa (1986). "Formation et carrière d'un grand personnage de la Curie au XIIe siècle: le cardinal Albinus," (in French) Mélanges de l'École française de Rome XCVIII (1986), pp. 623–671.
- Watterich, J. B. M. (1862). Pontificum Romanorum qui fuerunt inde ab exeunte saeculo IX usque ad finem saeculi XIII vitae: ab aequalibus conscriptae (in Latin). Vol. Tomus II. Leipzig: G. Engelmann.
