= Pandolfo da Lucca =

Italian cardinal

Pandolfo da Lucca (ca. 1140s–1201), erroneously Pandolfo Masca, was an Italian cardinal of the late 12th century. His name is sometimes given in the anglicised form Pandulf or Pandulph.

Pandolfo was born in Lucca in the early 1140s. He was the son of a certain Pietro di Roberto. In the 16th century, the Spanish historian Alfonso Chacón mistakenly assigned him to the noble Masca family from the Pisan commune, an error finally caught in 1844 by Domenico Barsocchini, who found a document from 1208 naming Pandolfo's father.

Pandolfo commissioned several paintings from Tuscany on the orders of Callixtus II, for which he was made sub-deacon of the apostolic seat. He was created a cardinal by Pope Lucius III in December 1182 with the title (titulus) of Santi XII Apostoli. He held this title at the time of the five papal elections at which he was present - Pope Urban III on November 25, 1185; Pope Gregory VIII on October 21, 1187; Pope Clement III on December 17–19, 1187; Pope Celestine III on March 25 (?) - 30, 1191; and Pope Innocent III on January 8, 1198. He subscribed the papal bulls between January 4, 1183 and November 11, 1200.

Pope Celestine III, wanting peace between Genoa and Pisa, sent Masca to Tuscany but, as for Lerici, at 1196 peace negotiations it proved impossible to arrive at an understanding. Anti-imperialist sentiment was also growing in Tuscany and, following the example of the Lombard League, a new league was formed, the League of San Genesio or the Tuscan League. The Church favoured such moves, seeing the need to return power to the Communes. On arrival in Tuscany, Masca succeeded in uniting the towns under the flag of the anti-feudality and of keeping themselves distinct from imperial authority. However, on the succession of Innocent III, the new pope did not wish to become part of the anti-imperialist league but instead to take possession of the Tuscan towns himself. Innocent wrote immediately to Masca and another cardinal who accepted the League's agreements (Bernardo, canon of S. Frediano of Lucca), affirming that the alliance had his disapproval since signoria (overlordship) over the March of Tuscany formally belonged to the Church, and as such the Pope could not negotiate with those who were in fact his subjects. Though this weakened the League, the Tuscan towns opposed the Pope in this, forcing him soon to give up the idea of a temporal dominion over Tuscany and limit himself to obstructing the League.

Owing to confusion with an earlier cardinal, Pandulf of Pisa, Pandolfo was thought to have been born in 1101 and thus died over the age of one hundred in or after 1201. In reality, Pandolfo seems to have gone into an informal retirement to his native Lucca after 1201. He never appears at the papal court after that date, but he was active in Lucca as late as 1201. He probably died late that year or early the next. He was certainly dead by 1213.
