= Theobald of Ostia =

French cardinal

Theobald of Ostia (French: Thibaut de Vermandois or Thibaut de Nanteuil, Italian: Teodobaldo di Vermandois; died 4 November 1188) was a French cardinal.

He entered the Order of Benedictines of the Congregation of Cluny in his youth. He was prior of the monastery of Saint-Arnoult-de-Crepy by 1169 and then abbot of Cluny from 1180 until 1183. In 1184, pope Lucius III named him Cardinal-Bishop of Ostia e Velletri; as such, he signed the papal bulls between 21 May 1184 and 29 October 1188. He served as papal legate in southern Germany in 1187. He participated in the papal election of 1185, of October 1187 and of December 1187; in the last one, he was elected to the papacy but declined in favour of Paolo Scolari, who was elected Pope Clement III. Shortly before his death, pope appointed him legate in England, but he was unable to fulfill this mission. He was buried in the Basilica of Saint Paul Outside the Walls, Rome.

== Sources ==
- Elfriede Kartusch: Das Kardinalskollegium in der Zeit von 1181–1227. Wien 1948, pp. 411–413 no. 105

Catholic Church titles
Preceded by Ubaldo Allucingoli	Bishop of Ostia; 1184–1188	Succeeded by Ottaviano di Paoli
Preceded by William I of Cluny	Abbot of Cluny; 1179-1183	Succeeded by Hugh de Clermont
