= Pope Gregory VIII =

Head of the Catholic Church in 1187

- Bishop of Rome
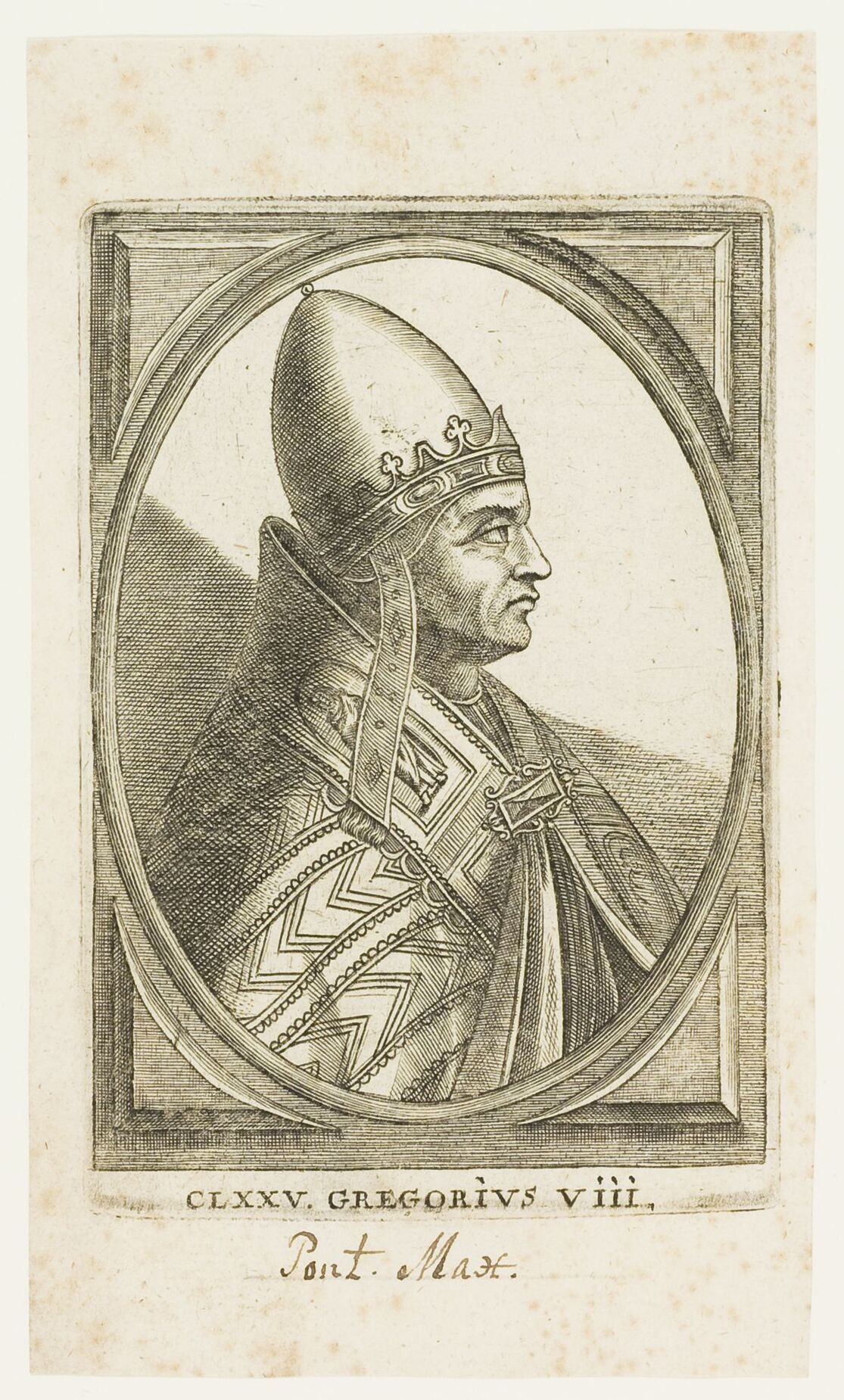
- Dutch engraving, made c. 1650
- Church: Catholic Church
- Papacy began: 21 October 1187
- Papacy ended: 17 December 1187
- Predecessor: Urban III
- Successor: Clement III

Orders
- Consecration: 25 October 1187
- Created cardinal: 1156 by Adrian IV

Personal details
- Born: Alberto di Morra c. 1100/1105 Benevento, Papal States
- Died: 17 December 1187 Pisa, Republic of Pisa
- Coat of arms

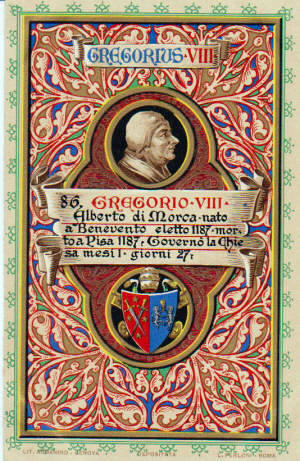
Gregory VIII on a 19th-century religious card

Pope Gregory VIII (Latin: Gregorius VIII; c. 1100/1105 – 17 December 1187), born Alberto di Morra, was head of the Catholic Church and ruler of the Papal States for two months in 1187. Becoming Pope after a long diplomatic career as Apostolic Chancellor, he was notable in his brief reign for reconciling the Papacy with the estranged Holy Roman Empire and for initiating the Third Crusade.

== Early life ==
Alberto di Morra was born about 1105 in Benevento. His father was the nobleman Sartorius di Morra. He became a monk early in life, either as a Cistercian in Laon, or a Benedictine at Monte Cassino. Alberto later joined a new religious order, the Premonstratensian or Norbertine order, probably between the ages of 20–30. He was a canon at St. Martin's Abbey in Laon. He later became a professor of canon law in Bologna.

== Cardinal ==
In 1156, Pope Adrian IV made him cardinal-deacon of Sant'Adriano, and on 14 March 1158 he became cardinal-priest of San Lorenzo in Lucina. As a papal legate of Pope Alexander III, he was sent to teach canon law throughout Europe in the 1160s, and was sent to Portugal to crown Afonso I. He also brought an offer of reconciliation in 1163 to Holy Roman Emperor Frederick I Barbarossa, whom Pope Alexander III had excommunicated in 1160. Alexander also sent him to England to investigate the murder of Thomas Becket, and he absolved King Henry II of the murder during the Council of Avranches. From 1177 to 1179, Alberto also served as a legate in Italy and in February 1178 was named Chancellor of the Holy Roman Church. As Chancellor he generally pursued a conciliatory line toward the Emperor; in the controversy over the disputed succession of the Archbishop of Trier he argued strongly in favor of setting aside both the pro-papal candidate Folmar of Karden and the pro-imperial Rudolf of Wied, and allowing the canons of Trier to hold a new election, but was overruled by Pope Urban III. It was in this position that di Morra "...compiled a Forma Dicendi, a collection of official papal acts, and also completed a codification of the cursus, a compilation of the very stringent rules governing the euphonious arrangements of sentence endings and phrasing in papal acts. In his honour, the cursus was called stylus gregorianus." These two documents were very influential in shaping the rhetoric used in papal documents. Shortly before his election to the papacy, Alberto founded a monastery in his hometown of Benevento.

== Papacy ==
On 21 October 1187, the day after the death of Urban III, Alberto di Morra, at that time Protopriest of the College of Cardinals, was elected pope (after Henry of Marcy had withdrawn his name from consideration), and took the name Gregory VIII in honour of Gregory VII. He was consecrated on 25 October. His previous dealings with Frederick Barbarossa put the church back in a friendly relationship with the Holy Roman Emperor. In response to the defeat of the crusader Kingdom of Jerusalem at the Battle of Hattin, Gregory issued the papal bull Audita tremendi calling for the Third Crusade. Gregory travelled to Pisa in order to end Pisan hostilities with Genoa so that both seaports and naval fleets could join for the crusade. On the way to Pisa, he stopped at Lucca and ordered Antipope Victor IV's body to be removed from his tomb and his remains thrown out of the church.

== Death ==
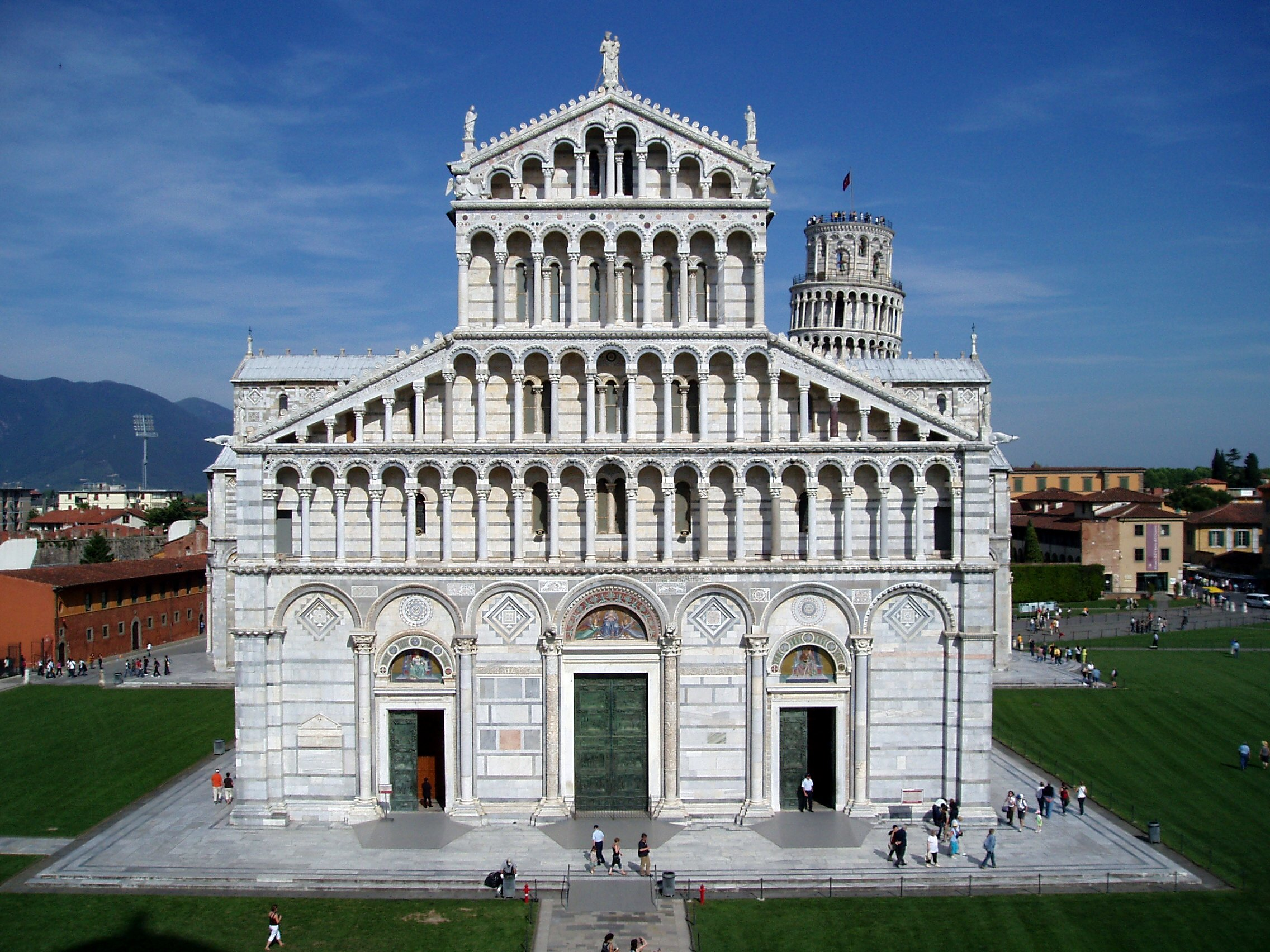
Gregory VIII is buried at Pisa Cathedral

Gregory died in Pisa on 17 December 1187 of a fever after holding the papacy for only 57 days. He was buried in the Duomo in Pisa; the tomb and the papal remains were destroyed in the 1600 fire of the cathedral. He was succeeded by Clement III. According to Joseph S. Brusher, "His pontificate though brief was glorious."

== See also ==
- List of popes
- October 1187 Papal election

== Bibliography ==
- Brusher, Joseph S. (1959). Popes through the Ages. Van Nostrand.
- Delaney, John J., and James E. Tobin. Dictionary of Catholic Biography. New York, NY: Doubleday, 1961.
- Falconieri, Tommaso di Carpegna (2000). "Gregorio VIII". (in Italian) Enciclopedia dei Papi (Treccani 2000).
- Giesebrecht, Wilhelm von & Simson, Bernhard von (1895), Geschichte der deutschen Kaiserzeit, vol. VI, Leipzig: Duncker & Humblot, available at the Internet Archive here: Volume VI. (in German)
- Gregorovius, Ferdinand (1903). The Tombs of the Popes: Landmarks in Papal History. Archibald Constable & Co Ltd.
- Kelly, J. N. (1986). The Oxford Dictionary of Popes. Oxford UP. ISBN 9780192139641.
- Loughlin, James. "Pope Gregory VIII." The Catholic Encyclopedia. Vol. 6. New York: Robert Appleton Company, 1909. 7 December 2008.
- Reuss, Basil R. (1933). "A Norbertine Pope?". The Catholic Historical Review. 19 (2): 200–202. ISSN 0008-8080. JSTOR 25013158.
- Vones, Ludwig (2002). "Gregory VIII". In Levillain, Philippe (ed.). The Papacy: An Encyclopedia. Vol. 2: Gaius-Proxies. Routledge. ISBN 0-415-92230-5.
- Walsh, Michael (2003). The Conclave: A Sometimes Secret and Occasionally Bloody History of Papal Elections. Sheed & Ward. ISBN 1-58051-135-X.

Catholic Church titles
| Preceded by Urban III | Pope; 1187 | Succeeded by Clement III |
