= Philipp Jaffé =

German historian and philologist (1819–1870)

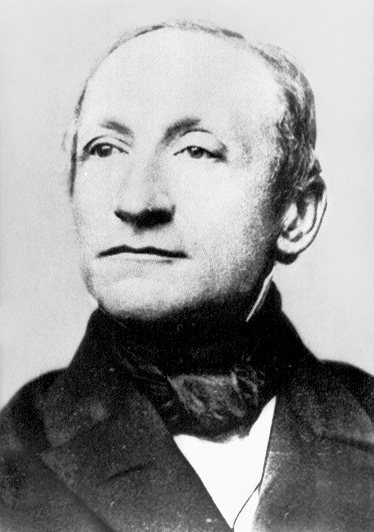
- Born: 17 February 1819; Schwersenz, Prussia
- Died: 3 April 1870 (aged 51); Wittenberge, Prussia
- Known for: Regesta Pontificum Romanorum

Academic background
- Education: University of Berlin
- Academic advisor: Leopold von Ranke

Academic work
- Discipline: History, philology
- Institutions: University of Berlin

Philipp Jaffé (17 February 1819 – 3 April 1870) was a German historian and philologist. He was one of the most important German medievalists of the 19th century.

== Biography ==
Letter from Jaffé (1866)

After graduating from the gymnasium at Posen in 1838 he went to Berlin, entering a banking-house. Two years later he abandoned commercial life and studied at the University of Berlin (Ph.D. 1844). Seven years later appeared his great work, Regesta Pontificum Romanorum ab Condita Ecclesia ad Annum p. Ch. n. 1198, containing 11,000 papal documents, (Berlin, 1851. 2nd ed. by Löwenfeld, Kaltenbrunner, and Ewald. Leipzig, 1885–88). This work made him well known, but he had still to earn a livelihood; he therefore again entered the university, this time as a student of medicine, at Berlin and later at Vienna. Graduating as M.D. from Berlin in 1853, he engaged in practise in that city for a year, and then became one of the editors of the Monumenta Germaniae Historica. This position he resigned in 1863, his chief work having been vols. xii, xvi, xvii, xviii, xix, and xx of the Scriptores.

In 1862 Jaffé was appointed assistant professor of history at Humboldt University of Berlin, where he lectured on Latin paleography and Roman and medieval chronology. In 1868 he became a Christian. During the last year of his life he suffered from delirium persecutionis.

Jaffé wrote, in addition to the above-mentioned works, Geschichte des Deutschen Reiches unter Lothar dem Sachsen, Berlin, 1843; Geschichte des Deutschen Reiches unter Konrad III. Hanover, 1845; and Bibliotheca Rerum Germanicarum, ib. 1864–1871. The latter series contained editions of the correspondence and vitae of Saint Boniface; his edition of the Boniface correspondence was praised as the first critical edition of the letters, and formed the basis for subsequent translations and editions of the letters, including that by Georg Pfahler. Jaffé furthermore collaborated with Wilhelm Wattenbach in editing the Ecclesiæ Metropolitanæ Coloniensis Codices, which was published (Berlin, 1879) by Wattenbach after Jaffé's death. Jaffé committed suicide at Wittenberge on 3 April 1870.

== See also ==
- Jaffe family
