= Pope Clement III =

Head of the Catholic Church from 1187 to 1191

- Bishop of Rome
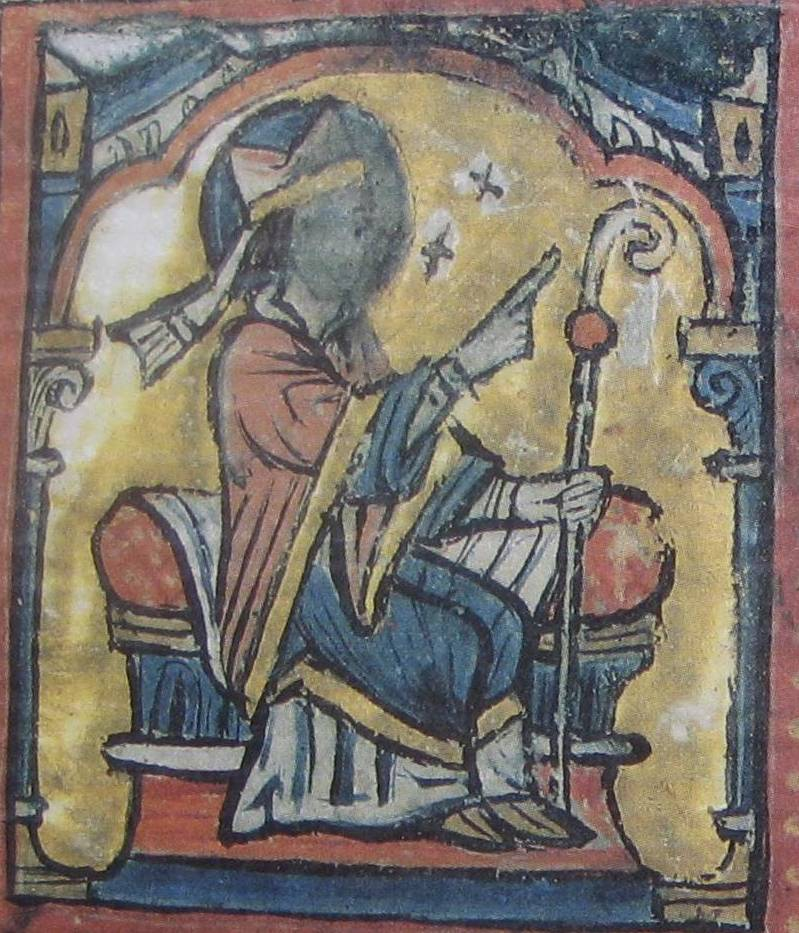
- 13th century miniature of Pope Clement III from the Speculum Grandimontis
- Church: Catholic Church
- Papacy began: 19 December 1187
- Papacy ended: 20 March 1191
- Predecessor: Gregory VIII
- Successor: Celestine III

Orders
- Created cardinal: March 1179 by Alexander III

Personal details
- Born: Paolo Scolari; 1130 Rome, Papal States, Holy Roman Empire
- Died: 20 March 1191 (aged 60–61) Rome, Papal States
- Coat of arms: Clement III's coat of arms

Ordination history of Pope Clement III
History
Cardinalate
- Elevated by: Pope Alexander III
- Date: March 1179
Episcopal succession
Bishops consecrated by Pope Clement III as principal consecrator
- Archbishop Dauferius: December 1188
- Martinho Pires: 1189
- Archbishop Bernard: 19 November 1189

Pope Clement III (Latin: Clemens III; 1130 – 20 March 1191), born Paolo Scolari, was the head of the Catholic Church and ruler of the Papal States from 19 December 1187 to his death in 1191. He ended the conflict between the Papacy and the city of Rome, by allowing the election of magistrates, which reinstalled the Papacy back in the city after a six-year exile. Clement, faced with a deplete college of cardinals, created thirty-one cardinals over three years, the most since Adrian IV. He died 20 March 1191 and was quickly replaced by Celestine III.

== Family ==
Paolo Scolari was born in 1130 in Rome, at the Rione of the Pigna, into a family of high social level but not noble, son of Giovanni and of his consort Maria and according to some scholars related to the mother of Pope Innocent III. Pope Alexander III appointed him archpriest of the patriarchal Liberian Basilica, cardinal-deacon of Sergio e Bacco, and finally cardinal bishop of Palestrina in December 1180.

== Election ==
Paolo was elected as the new Pope on December 19, 1187, two days after the death of Gregory VIII. He was the cardinals' second choice, but their first choice, cardinal Theobald of Ostia, refused the papal throne. Clement was the second Roman pope since Innocent II.

Two months before being elected pope, Paolo Scolari had been rejected as a papal candidate by the cardinals due to being in poor health. Even during his office as pope his health was a cause of concern. An instance of his poor health was six months after he was elected in June 1188 the cardinals thought Clement was going to die and had pope-elect Cardinal Bishop Teobald of Ostia on hand for when Clement died. Though Clement was old and ill, he was still elected as pope and could have something to do with the small number of cardinals, only eight Cardinals and three of them having been known Romans, at the election of Clement. The electors of Clement may have been aiming for the possibility of returning the curia to Rome, which would in fact happen during his time as pope.

== Papacy ==
Shortly after his accession at the conclusion of the papal election of December 1187, Clement succeeded in allaying the conflict which had existed for half a century between the popes and the citizens of Rome, with an agreement by which the citizens were allowed to elect their magistrates, while the nomination of the governor of the city remained in the hands of the pope. In March 1188 Clement III had agreed that the Roman Church would reimburse numerous Roman citizens who have not received any beneficia since Pope Lucius III, a probable cause of the conflict between the pope and Romans. On 31 May 1188 he concluded a treaty with the Romans which removed long standing difficulties, thus returning the papacy to Rome. Clement wrote a letter to Archbishop of Toledo, Gonzalo Perez, where he bemoaned the power conflicts and political division among Spain's Christian population. The pope emphasized in this letter that the Christian war in Spain, the Reconquista, against Muslims was comparable to the Crusades in the Holy Land and urged for effective unity and the formation of a powerful army to combat them.

Clement also inherited a depleted college of cardinals, consisting of no more than twenty cardinals. He orchestrated three series of promotions (March 1188, May 1189 and October 1190) that resulted in thirty-one cardinals. This number of cardinals had not been seen since 1159, under Hadrian IV. During Clement's papacy, the majority of cardinals were Romans, possibly due to Clement III being Roman as well and wanting to fill the Church with Romans.

=== Actions ===
Clement sent the Archbishop of Tyre, Josias, to persuade King Henry II of England and King Philip II of France to undertake the Third Crusade.

Though the relationship between Rome and Sicily had been turbulent, before 1188 the Romans had become increasingly frustrated with Papal governence which led to two rival factions in the College of Cardinals, one faction inclined toward an alliance with the Sicily, the other side seeking reconciliation with the Holy Roman Emperor.

In April 1189, Clement ended the conflict with Frederick I Barbarossa. Despite agreeing to crown Henry VI as Holy Roman Emperor, Clement III angered him by bestowing Sicily on Tancred, son of Roger III, Duke of Apulia. The crisis was acute when the Pope died in the latter part of March 1191.

Pope Alexander III had prohibited supplying goods and military information to Muslims. Pope Clement increased the list of banned items in a series of decretals and called for a full trade embargo with the Islamic world.

Clement settled a controversy with King William I of Scotland concerning the choice of the archbishop of St Andrews, and on 13 March 1188 removed the Scottish church from the legatine jurisdiction of the Archbishop of York, thus making it independent of all save Rome.

=== Death ===
Clement died on 10 April 1191. Celestine III, who was 85, was elected the day of Clement's death unanimously. Celestine was not involved with either of the sides or factions that were the 'imperialists' nor the 'Sicilians'.

== See also ==
- List of popes
- Cardinals created by Clement III

== Sources ==
- Benson, Robert Louis; Figueira, Robert Charles (2006). Plenitude of power: the doctrines and exercise of authority in the Middle Ages. Ashgate Publishing Ltd.
- Lower, Michael (2014). "The Papacy and Christian Mercenaries of Thirteenth-Century North Africa". Speculum. 89 (3): 601–631. doi:10.1017/S0038713414000761. JSTOR 43577030. S2CID 154773840.
- Marin-Guzmán, Roberto (1992). "Crusade in Al-Andalus: The Eleventh Century formation of the Reconquista as an Ideology". Islamic Studies. 31 (3 (Autumn)): 287–318.
- McBrien, Richard P. (2000). Lives of the Popes. HarperCollins Publishers.
- Robinson, I. S (1990). The Papacy, 1073–1198: Continuity and Innovation. doi:10.1017/CBO9781139167772. ISBN 978-1-139-16777-2. OCLC 1172526387.
- Runciman, Steven (1999). A History of the Crusades. Vol. 3: The Kingdom of Acre and the Later Crusades. Cambridge University Press.
- Tartakoff, Paola (2015). "Testing Boundaries: Jewish Conversion and Cultural Fluidity in Medieval Europe, c. 1200-1391". Speculum. 90 (3): 728–762. doi:10.1017/S0038713415001402. JSTOR 43577434. S2CID 155265107.
- Walsh, Michael J. (2003). The Conclave: A Sometimes Secret and Occasionally Bloody History of Papal Elections. Canterbury Press Norwich.
- Wickham, Chris (2015). Medieval Rome: Stability & Crisis of a City, 900-1150. Oxford University Press.

Attribution:

Catholic Church titles
Preceded by Gregory VIII	Pope; 1187–91	Succeeded by Celestine III
