= Pope Lucius III =

Head of the Catholic Church from 1181 to 1185

- Bishop of Rome
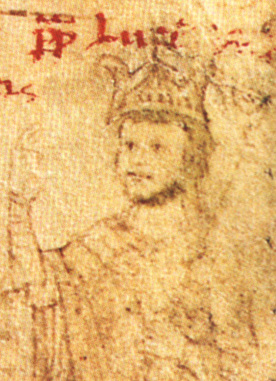
- Depiction of Lucius III from the Liber ad honorem Augusti by Peter of Eboli (1196)
- Church: Catholic Church
- Papacy began: 1 September 1181
- Papacy ended: 25 November 1185
- Predecessor: Alexander III
- Successor: Urban III
- Previous posts: Cardinal-Deacon of San Adriano (1138–41); Cardinal-Priest of Santa Prassede (1141–58); Cardinal-Bishop of Ostia e Velletri (1158–81); Legate to Constantinople (1167–69)

Orders
- Consecration: 1159
- Created cardinal: December 1138 by Innocent II

Personal details
- Born: Ubaldo Allucingoli c. 1100 Lucca, March of Tuscany, Holy Roman Empire
- Died: 25 November 1185 (aged 84–85) Verona, Holy Roman Empire
- Coat of arms: Lucius III's coat of arms

Pope Lucius III (born Ubaldo Allucingoli; 1100 – 25 November 1185) was head of the Catholic Church and sovereign of the Papal States from 1181 until his death in 1185. Born in the Holy Roman Empire to an aristocratic family, he emerged as an experienced papal diplomat. His papacy was marked by conflict with the Holy Roman Emperor Frederick I (Frederick Barbarossa), culminating in his exile from Rome, and initial preparations for the Third Crusade.

Born in Lucca, Ubaldo Allucingoli rose to prominence within the Catholic Church, eventually becoming Pope Lucius III. He was appointed cardinal by Pope Innocent II and served as papal legate in France, Sicily, and other regions. He was involved in negotiating the Treaty of Venice in 1177, and was elected pope in 1181.

During his papacy, Lucius III faced disputes with the Holy Roman Emperor Frederick I over the territories of the late Countess Matilda of Tuscany. He also held a synod in 1184 that condemned various heretical groups. In 1185, preparations began for the Third Crusade, but Lucius III died in Verona before they were completed.

== Early career ==
A native of the city of Lucca, he was born c. 1100 (perhaps 1097) as Ubaldo, son of aristocrat Orlando Allucingoli.

He had close ties to the Cistercians, but it seems that he never joined the order. Pope Innocent II named him cardinal in December 1138, initially as cardinal-deacon of San Adriano, then (in May 1141) as cardinal-priest of Santa Prassede and sent him as legate to France. Under Pope Eugene III, he served as legate to Sicily, and in January 1159, Pope Adrian IV promoted him to Cardinal Bishop of Ostia and Velletri. As dean of the Sacred College of Cardinals, he was one of the most influential cardinals under his predecessor Pope Alexander III, whom he had consecrated bishop in 1159.

In 1177, Allucingoli took part in the negotiation of the Treaty of Venice where an agreement was reached between Alexander III and Emperor Frederick I who had been excommunicated for his support of the successive antipopes Victor IV, Paschal III and Callixtus III. Allucingoli then served as a member of the court of arbitration regarding the Terre Matildiche, (lands formerly held by the late Countess Matilda of Tuscany to which the Church and the Emperor both laid claim), but which reached no definite conclusion.

== Papacy ==
Cardinal Allucingoli was elected pope at Velletri in September 1181, taking the name Lucius. He lived at Rome from November 1181 to March 1182, but dissensions in the city compelled him to pass the remainder of his pontificate in exile, mainly at Velletri, Anagni and Verona.

At Velletri he received the ambassadors of King William of Scotland who had disputed with Alexander III's candidates to fill a vacancy of the See of St. Andrews. The King appointed his chaplain Hugh, but the canons of the chapter had elected the archdeacon John Scotus. Lucius freed the king from all ecclesiastical censures incurred under his predecessor and agreed to a compromise by which Hugh was raised to the see of St. Andrews and John became Bishop of Dunkeld. In March 1183, as a sign of good will the pope sent the king the Golden Rose. In September of that year he went to Segni to canonize Saint Bruno, who had been bishop of that commune.

Lucius was in dispute with the Holy Roman Emperor Frederick I over the disposal of the territories of the late Countess Matilda of Tuscany. The controversy over the succession to the inheritance of the Countess had been left unsettled by an agreement of 1177, and the Emperor proposed in 1182 that the Curia should renounce its claim, receiving in exchange two-tenths of the imperial income from Italy, one-tenth for the Pope and the other tenth for the cardinals. Lucius consented neither to this proposition nor to another compromise suggested by Frederick I the next year, nor did a personal discussion between the two potentates at Verona in October 1184 lead to any definite result.

During the conflict between Frederick I and the papacy, the problem of heresy required a political solution. In 1184, Lucius decreed Ad abolendam that all "counts, barons, rectors, [and] consuls of cities and other places" who did not join in the struggle against heresy when called upon to do so would be excommunicated and their territories placed under interdict – and declared that these provisions joined the apostolic authority of the church with the sanction of imperial power.

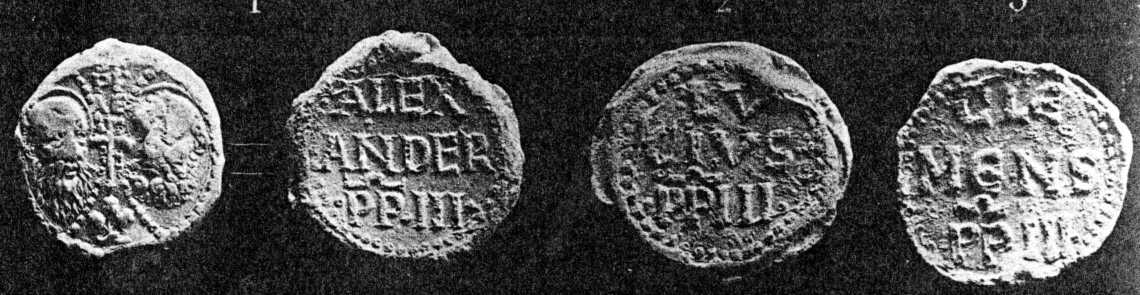
Bullas of Lucius III

In the meantime, other causes of disagreement appeared when the Pope refused to comply with Frederick I's wishes as to the Imperial regulation of German episcopal elections which had taken place under the authority of the German-sponsored antipopes, both during and after the recent schism (1159–1176), especially as regards an election to the See of Trier in 1183 contested between the papal candidate Folmar of Karden and the imperial candidate Rudolf of Wied.

In pursuance of his anti-imperial policy, Lucius declined in 1185 to crown Henry of Hohenstaufen as Frederick I's destined successor, and the breach between the Empire and the Curia became wider on questions of Italian politics.

In November 1184, Lucius held a synod at Verona which condemned the Cathars and Paterines, Waldensians, Josephines, Pasagians and Arnoldists, and anathematized all those declared as heretics and their abettors. Contrary to what is often said, he did not institute the Inquisition, which was not created until the reign of Pope Gregory IX in 1234.

Despite the fulminations of the first three Lateran Councils against married clergy, Lucius wrote in 1184 to the abbot of St. Augustine Canterbury suggesting that the parson of Willesborough should retire and pass the benefice to his promising son, who could then pursue his studies, showing continued papal tolerance of married clergy at this late date.

== Death ==
In 1185, preparations began for the Third Crusade in answer to the appeals of King Baldwin IV of Jerusalem. Before they were completed, Lucius III died in Verona.

== See also ==
- List of popes
- Cardinals created by Lucius III

== Sources ==
- Philippe Levillain, John W. O'Malley, The Papacy. An Encyclopedia, 2002

Catholic Church titles
Preceded by Ugone	Bishop of Ostia; 1158–81	Succeeded by Theobald
Preceded by Alexander III	Pope; 1181–85	Succeeded by Urban III
