= Pope Urban III =

Head of the Catholic Church from 1185 to 1187

- Bishop of Rome
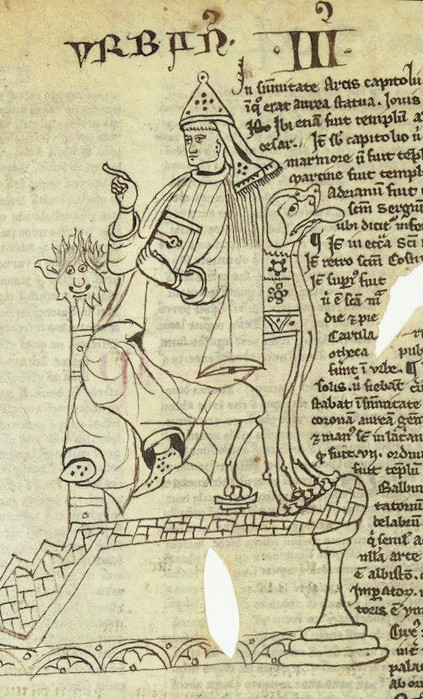
- Urban III in a 14th-century miniature
- Church: Catholic Church
- Papacy began: 25 November 1185
- Papacy ended: 20 October 1187
- Predecessor: Lucius III
- Successor: Gregory VIII
- Previous posts: Bishop of Vercelli (1182–85); Cardinal-Priest of San Lorenzo in Damaso (1182–85); Archbishop of Milan (1185)

Orders
- Consecration: 1182
- Created cardinal: September 1173 by Alexander III

Personal details
- Born: Uberto Crivelli; 1120 Cuggiono, Holy Roman Empire
- Died: 20 October 1187 (aged 66–67) Ferrara, Holy Roman Empire
- Coat of arms

Pope Urban III (born Uberto Crivelli; died 20 October 1187) served as head of the Catholic Church and ruler of the Papal States from 25 November 1185 until his death in 1187. A native of Milan, Urban III was elected pope at a time of intense conflict between the papacy and the Holy Roman Empire, particularly with Emperor Frederick Barbarossa. His brief pontificate was dominated by disputes over ecclesiastical jurisdiction in northern Italy and Germany, resistance to imperial influence over episcopal appointments, and the continuing repercussions of the 1177 Treaty of Venice.

Before his election, Crivelli pursued a distinguished clerical and legal career, serving as the archbishop of Milan from 1185 until his election, and as a papal legate and cardinal-priest of San Lorenzo in Lucina. His Milanese background and firm defense of papal prerogatives shaped his confrontational stance toward imperial authority, especially in his refusal to recognize certain imperial candidates for bishoprics and his support for the autonomy of the Lombard churches.

Urban III’s pontificate coincided with mounting instability in the eastern Mediterranean. Although he died shortly after news of the defeat of the Kingdom of Jerusalem at the Battle of Hattin reached Europe in 1187, his reign formed part of the immediate prelude to the Third Crusade, which was proclaimed by his successor Pope Gregory VIII. Urban III was buried in Ferrara, where he had taken refuge during the final months of his life amid political unrest in Rome.

== Early career ==
Crivelli was born in Cuggiono as the son of Guala Crivelli. He studied in Bologna. His original title is unknown, but he opted to be the Cardinal-Priest of San Lorenzo in Lucina in 1182. Lucius appointed him Archbishop of Milan in 1185. Lucius III died on 25 November 1185; Cardinal Crivelli was elected that same day. The haste was probably due to fear of imperial interference.

== Pontificate ==
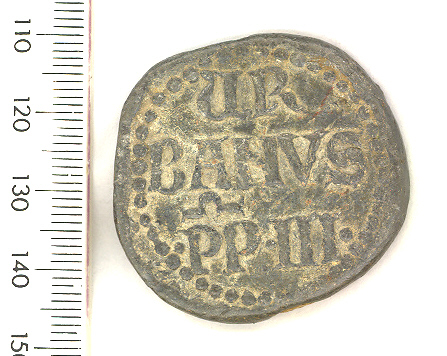
Bulla of Urban III

Urban III vigorously took up his predecessor's quarrels with Holy Roman Emperor Frederick I Barbarossa, including the standing dispute about the disposal of the territories of the countess Matilda of Tuscany. This was embittered by personal enmity, for at the sack of Milan in 1162 the emperor had caused several of the pope's relatives to be proscribed or mutilated. After his elevation to the papacy, Urban III continued to hold the archbishopric of Milan, and in this capacity refused to crown as King of Italy Frederick I's son Henry, who had married Constance, the heiress of the kingdom of Sicily. By this marriage/bond the papacy lost that Norman support on which it had so long relied in its contests with the emperor.

Urban exerted himself to bring about peace between England and France, and on 23 June 1187, his legates by threats of excommunication prevented a pitched battle between the armies of the rival kings near Châteauroux, and brought about a two years' truce.

While Henry in the south cooperated with the rebel Senate of Rome, his father Frederick blocked the passes of the Alps and cut off all communication between Urban, then living in Verona, and his German adherents. Urban now resolved on excommunicating Frederick I, but the Veronese protested against such a proceeding being resorted to within their walls. He accordingly withdrew to Ferrara, but Urban died 20 October 1187, before he could give effect to his intentions. He was succeeded by Gregory VIII.

According to the chroniclers Ernoul and Benedict of Peterborough, Urban III died of shock and grief after Joscius, Archbishop of Tyre brought him news of the Christian defeat at the Battle of Hattin. It is also commonly stated that Urban's death was caused by the news of the fall of Jerusalem, but William of Newburgh stated the report of the disaster of Hattin (3-4 July) did not reach the Holy See until after the election of Gregory VIII, it may be that Urban III never heard of the surrender of the Holy City, which took place on 2 October.

== See also ==
- List of popes
- Cardinals created by Urban III

== Sources ==
- Duffy, Eamon (2001). Saints & sinners: A History of the Popes. Yale University Press. p. 392. ISBN 0-300-09165-6.
- Kelly, John Norman Davidson; Walsh, Michael J., eds. (2005). "Urban III". The Oxford dictionary of popes. Oxford University Press. ISBN 9780198614333.
- Loud, Graham (2019). The Chronicle of Arnold of Lübeck. Routledge. ISBN 9780429624520.

Catholic Church titles
Preceded by Lucius III	Pope; 1185–87	Succeeded by Gregory VIII
