= Dietrich, Count of Wied =

Count of Wied from 1161 to 1200

Dietrich (or Theodoric) was the count of Wied from 1161 until he retired to become a monk around 1200. He took part in the Third Crusade (1189–1190) but returned home early. Caesarius of Heisterbach records two miracle stories told to him by Dietrich.

== Family ==
Dietrich was the son of Count Siegfried and the elder brother of Archbishop Rudolf of Trier. He may have received his military education under Conrad, Count Palatine of the Rhine. In June 1157, he was with Conrad at the monastery of Maulbronn. In April 1158, he was with Conrad at the royal palace in Sinzig, where Conrad's brother, King Frederick I, was staying.

Dietrich had six sons:

- George, who succeeded him as count
- Lothar, who succeeded George as count
- Conrad (fl. 1204–1213), advocate of Andernach (1211–1213), may have later entered the church
- Dither (fl. 1213–1223)
- Dietrich, archbishop of Trier (r. 1212–1242)
- Meffried (fl. 1204–1230), archdeacon of Trier

Dietrich also had two daughters, but their names are unknown. One married Lord Bruno I of Isenburg and was the mother of Archbishop Arnold II of Trier. The other married Gottfried of Eppstein and was the mother of Archbishop Siegfried III of Mainz.

== Count ==
Dietrich succeeded his father, who probably died at the siege of Milan, as count in 1161. His first recorded act as count was to attend the synod of Trier in 1162, convoked by Archbishop Hillin of Trier as legate for Pope Victor IV. The count of Wied was one of the leading subjects of the archbishop. Dietrich heads the list of witnesses in an act of Archbishop Arnold I in 1180.

Sometime between August 1168 and 1173, Dietrich was enfeoffed by Archbishop Philip I of Cologne with the advocacy of the town of Andernach and its former imperial castle. For long before this the counts of Wied had been patrons of the monastery of Saint Mary at Andernach. Irmgard of Wied, who is recorded as abbess between 1178 and 1187, was probably a relative, and there were also two nuns from the related House of Kempenich. Dietrich heads the list of witnesses in a settlement between Saint Mary and the abbey of Malmedy in 1187.

In 1189, Dietrich joined the Third Crusade, setting out with Frederick I's army. He is mentioned at three points in the anonymous History of the Expedition of the Emperor Frederick: on 11 May 1189 when setting out from Regensburg; encamped with the other Rhinelanders on the Hungarian plain on 24 May 1189; and engaged in a raid in February 1190, at the height of Frederick's dispute with the Byzantine Empire. In the last case, Dietrich joined a detachment under the command of Bishop Godfrey of Würzburg alongside the Counts Henry II of Salm and Gottfried III of Sponheim. They captured two abandoned Vlach towns and attacked a third, killing 5,000 people in the process.

Not long after the raid and before the sudden death of Frederick, Dietrich left the crusade and returned home. There, later in 1190, he witnessed an act of Count Conrad. In 1192, 1194 and 1197, he witnessed documents for Archbishop John I of Trier; in 1195, for Archbishop Adolf of Cologne.

== Monk ==
Around 1200, Dietrich renounced the world, transferred the county of Wied and advocacy of Andernach to his eldest son and entered the monastery of Heisterbach, where he took vows and became a monk. Paul Pixton suggests that he may have been disillusioned by the German throne dispute that began in 1198. His younger contemporary, the monk Caesarius, records two stories he heard from Dietrich in his Dialogus miraculorum.

In the first story, Count Louis I of Loon avenged himself on a knight who had usurped his property by tricking a nobleman into capturing the man and handing him over by promising not to harm him. As soon as he was in his hands, Louis buried him alive. The relatives of the dead man accused the nobleman before Frederick I of having been paid for the crime. He agreed to a judicial duel. He took communion before the duel and his adversary mocked this, whereupon the latter's strength vanished and the nobleman triumphed easily. Dietrich was present at the duel.

In the second story, Dietrich reported how a butcher from Koblenz tarried in a tavern drinking long after the bell for Mass had rung on Ash Wednesday. When his companion suggested they go to church, the butcher threw ashes on his companion and invited him to do the same. For this mockery, the butcher was attacked by a whirlwind of ashes. Despite many efforts to save him, he could not escape the ashes and eventually choked to death.

== Sources ==
- Freed, John (2016). Frederick Barbarossa: The Prince and the Myth. Yale University Press.
- Johnson, Edgar N. (1969). "The Crusades of Frederick Barbarossa and Henry VI". In Kenneth M. Setton; Robert Lee Wolff; Harry Hazard (eds.). A History of the Crusades. Vol. II: The Later Crusades, 1189–1311. University of Wisconsin Press. pp. 87–122.
- Pepin, Ronald E., ed. (2023). Caesarius of Heisterbach: The Dialogue on Miracles. Cistercian Publications.
- Pixton, Paul Brewer (1972). Dietrich of Wied, Archbishop of Trier, 1212–1242: A Study of Princely Politics and Religious Reform (PhD dissertation). University of Iowa.
