= Bertram of Metz =

Saxon nobleman, jurist and prelate

The chronicler Emo citing "Master Berthold" (at the end of the fifth line up from the bottom)

Bertram, born Berthold (Note: His names may also be spelled Bertrand and Bertold or Bertolf.) (died 6 April 1212), was a Saxon nobleman, jurist and prelate of the Holy Roman Empire. Praised by contemporaries for his education, his expertise was in Roman law. He was the elected archbishop of Bremen from 1178 until 1179 and the bishop of Metz from 1180 until his death. He was in general a strong supporter of the Staufer emperors, although he was forced into internal exile and temporarily dispossessed of his diocese in 1187–1189. He supported the Staufer in the German throne dispute after 1198.

In 1199, Bertram suppressed a heretical movement in Metz, probably Waldensian, through book burning. His several efforts to strengthen his control of the city government brought him into conflict with the citizens from 1203 onward. In 1206, he joined a war against the County of Bar and lost. In 1209, he put down riots and won a decisive victory over the citizenry. His health declined in the last two years of his life. In the late medieval and early modern periods, he was regarded as one of the architects of the republic of Metz.

== Life ==
=== Education ===
Berthold was born into a minor noble Saxon family. He took minor orders and became an acolyte of the canons of St Gereon's in Cologne. He received an education in secular and canon law, the liberal arts and the Bible. He bore the title of magister. He probably studied under Girard la Pucelle at Cologne and may be the person referred to only by the initial B. in the summa called Omnis qui iuste, a work produced in Girard's circle.

=== Three elections ===
Perhaps as early as June 1178, Berthold was elected to succeed Archbishop Baldwin of Bremen, although he had not yet taken major orders. The provost of Bremen disputed this election as uncanonical. Archbishop Wichmann of Magdeburg also strongly opposed the election. In fact, the archdiocese had been in dispute since the double election of 1168. According to the Peace of Venice of 1177, Bishop Siegfried of Brandenburg would become archbishop if the canonicity of his election in 1168 could be confirmed. Baldwin's sudden death forestalled this process.

In October 1178, a second election was staged after Berthold had been ordained to the subdiaconate. He received a dispensation from Pope Alexander III, and then proceeded to the Third Lateran Council to have his election confirmed. On his way, he stopped at Worms to be invested with the temporalities of his office by the Emperor Frederick Barbarossa. At the Lateran in March 1179, he took his seat with the other archbishops but, according to Albert of Stade, was coolly received by them because he had not taken major orders. Responding to a complaint brought by Duke Henry the Lion of Saxony, who had initially supported Berthold, Alexander refused to consecrate him and the council revoked his election. His former teacher, Girard la Pucelle, spoke up in his defence calling him "a man arrayed in knowledge, instructed in the liberal arts, learned in both [Old and New] Testaments, expert in decretals and laws". (Note: scientia decoratum, liberalibus artibus instructum, utriusque testamenti pagina eruditum, decretorum legumque industria peritum virum.)

The same council quashed the election to Metz of the emperor's nephew, Thierry IV. With the emperor's support and the pope's blessing, Berthold was elected to succeed him sometime before January 1180, when his election was confirmed by the pope. He was with the emperor at Würzburg on 25 January. He was consecrated between 12 and 20 March, probably by Cardinal Peter of Tusculum. He then took the name Bertram. The emperor invested Siegfried with Bremen in April.

=== Bishop of Metz ===
==== City government ====
During his episcopate, Bertram retained control of the municipal government of the republic of Metz. The county of Metz likewise remained a fief of the bishopric and the count—Albert of Dabo throughout Bertram's episcopate—was also his grand advocate in the city. His first act as bishop, dated 21 March 1180, was to direct that the head alderman be elected annually. At the time, Hugues de Port-Sailly had been serving in this role since 1149. Bertram intended to reduce the power of the rich families of Metz and replaced election by clergy and people with election by clergy alone, limiting the electorate to the abbots of the Benedictine houses and the dean of the chapter of Metz Cathedral. Pope Urban III confirmed Bertram's act in a bull dated 22 April 1186 or 1187. Bertram also reformed the cathedral chancery school, introducing the system which he had known at Cologne. His changes to the municipal constitution brought him into conflict with the leading families of the city.

In 1189, Bertram introduced new regulations for money changers and butchers in Metz. In 1197, he founded the Amandellerie, an agency composed of Amtmenn charged with copying and archiving private contracts in the arches (archives) and giving testimony in court in case of disputes. Probably in 1203 or 1204, certainly by the end of 1207, Bertram had to contend with the new institution of the thirteen jurors (jurés), (Note: Marianne Pundt argued that the jurors were a creation of Bertram and King Philip to draw power away from Count Albert. It seems more likely that the jurors were created by the leading citizens to maintain their dominance and only accepted by Bertram after the loss of Vic in 1207. In 1203 or 1204, the citizens destroyed the castle of Freistroff, although it is not known why or whose castle it was at the time. This military undertaking may presuppose the existence of the thirteen jurors already by that date. Bertram does not seem to have been involved.) created by the same established families who controlled the aldermen, the city advocate and the three mayors.

==== Dispute over Trier and exile ====
During the first years of his episcopate, Bertram spent more time at the itinerant court of the emperor than in Metz. He favoured the deposition of Henry the Lion (1180) and was present when the Peace of Constance between Frederick and the Italian city-states was agreed (June 1183). The disputed election to the archbishopric of Trier, of which Metz was a suffragan, in 1183 ultimately brought him into conflict with the emperor. One of the elected candidates was Folmar of Karden, archdeacon of Metz; the other, Rudolf of Wied, was the candidate the emperor invested. Bertram seems never to have given Rudolf obedience.

In June 1186, Urban III consecrated Folmar in contravention of a previous agreement with the emperor. Since the emperor was in control of Trier, Folmar went first to the suffragan diocese of Toul, but Bishop Peter of Brixey refused him. He was then accepted in Metz by Bertram. He ultimately found refuge with Theobald, lord of Briey. At an assembly in Kaiserslautern in October–November, Bertram swore an oath that he had not known Folmar's consecration had not been recognized by the emperor when he had welcomed him. Nevertheless, he attended the provincial synod Folmar convoked in Mouzon in February 1187, while Peter of Brixey and Bishop Henry of Verdun stayed away. By 22 March 1187, Bertram had gone into internal exile in Cologne, where Archbishop Philip of Heinsberg was a dedicated imperial opponent. It is probable that he had sided with Philip even before deciding to attend Folmar's synod, and his exile may have begun as early as 1186. In response to Bertram's actions, the emperor seized the bishopric of Metz and placed it in the hands of the ministerialis Werner von Bolanden.

Philip made his peace with Frederick at the Diet of Metz in March 1188, but Bertram was not permitted to return to Metz until after June 1189, after Frederick had set out on the Third Crusade. His exile was ended on the advice of Frederick's son, Henry VI. The date of his return to Metz is uncertain, perhaps early as the summer of 1189, in the autumn or as late as 1190. In June or July 1190, he was present at the consecration of the new archbishop of Trier, John. From late 1191 through 1192, he was at the court of Henry VI, except for a short embassy to Rome in mid-1192, where he sought to break Pope Celestine III's alliance with King Tancred of Sicily.

==== German throne dispute ====
Following the disputed royal election of 1198, Bertram recognized the Staufer candidate, Philip of Swabia, as king and served him in a diplomatic capacity. He was the chief negotiator of the treaty of Worms (29 June 1198) between Philip and King Philip II of France, which was directed against King Richard I of England. According to the terms of the treaty, if Philip II had any complaint against a subject of the empire the case was to be heard by Philip of Swabia or by Bertram if the latter Philip was in the kingdom of Italy.

In 1202, Pope Innocent III ordered the clergy of the province of Trier to recognize Philip's opponent, Otto IV, as king. On 12 November, he ordered an inquiry into Bertram's ability to carry out his office given reports of a disease affecting his eyes (he was said to be almost blind). He authorized the cardinal-legate Guy Paré to appoint a coadjutor if Bertram was found to be incapacitated. In a letter of 24 February 1203, Innocent accused Bertram and Bishop John of Cambrai of refusing the legate their cooperation. Many charters attest to Bertram's activity in 1202, and the inquiry had apparently failed to justify his removal.

==== Suppression of Waldensians ====
In 1199, Bertram complained to the pope about the presence in his diocese of lay men and women who preached without a licence and had produced a translation of the Bible into French. They held secret meetings, criticized the clergy and lived in poverty. Bertram's description seems to indicate that these men and women were Waldensians. Bertram had previously met their leader, Peter Waldo, at the Lateran council in 1179. He was also present at the meeting between Frederick Barbarossa and Pope Lucius III in November 1184, when the Waldensians were first officially condemned. He does not name the sect active in Metz as Waldensian. The first sources to do so are Caesar of Heisterbach, according to whom Bertram was verbally attacked in his own cathedral by two Waldensians, (Note: Caesar's account is not wholly trustworthy and he has Bertram making an otherwise unknown trip to Montpellier.) and Aubrey of Trois-Fontaines. There is evidence that some of the leading townspeople had adopted Waldensian views.

Bertram wrote to the pope, naming the leading Waldensians. On 12 July 1199, Innocent wrote letters to Bertram and the citizens of Metz. Innocent ordered Bertram to investigate the vernacular translation of the Bible the heretics were using and to submit a report to Rome. His appeal to the people was apparently ineffective, and Bertram wrote him another letter. He identified one of the sect's leaders, Crispin, as a renegade priest. He had been unable to identify the translators, but the leaders claimed to obey God alone. On 9 December, Innocent charged the abbots of Cîteaux, La Crête and Morimond with aiding in the suppression of the sect. As a result, some of the sectarians' books were burnt. Nevertheless, anticlerical ideas may have been popular with even the powerful citizens in Metz and the heresy, while dampened, was not eradicated. When the Fifth Crusade was preached there in 1211 there was opposition and Caesar of Heisterbach records the presence of strong anticlerical sentiment as late as 1221.

==== War with Bar ====
In September 1206, Albert of Dabo engaged his newborn daughter, Gertrude, to Theobald, heir of Duke Frederick II of Lorraine. All of Albert's several counties and advocacies, including Metz, would thus pass to Lorraine. Bertram must have consented to this arrangement, because he allied with duke of Lorraine against Theobald of Briey, by then count of Bar. He may also have hoped that the duke would prove a stronger counter to the republic of Metz than Albert had been. Both Duke Frederick and King Philip celebrated Christmas 1207 in Metz, hosted by Bertram and Albert. The war against Theobald went badly for Bertram. He lost Vic-sur-Seille in 1207 and in 1208 the duke was captured and forced to accept peace terms.

==== Riots of 1209 ====
A dispute with the citizens over the funding of the new city wall, which began in 1203, degenerated into riots in January 1209. The citizens demanded that the clergy contribute to the funding and, led by the jurors, pillaged the cathedral and the Benedictine houses. Although Bertram placed the jurors and then on 22 February the whole city under excommunication, some priests continued to give the rioters Mass. Moreover, the Hospitallers and Templars in the city sided with the rioters. The conflict cut across class lines, but probably owed much to family and local loyalties.

On 9 April 1209, Innocent III asked Archbishop Siegfried II of Mainz to back up Bertram's excommunications with his own. Bertram and the city made peace on 15 July 1209 through the mediation of the abbots of Morimond and Trois-Fontaines. The citizens agreed to recompense the churches for their losses and admitted that the clergy were exempt from paying for the wall. This represented a total but temporary victory of Bertram over the jurors. They would play a limited role in the politics of Metz until the 1220s.

=== Death ===
Bertram fell ill at the start of 1210 and convalesced at the abbey of Sainte-Croix de Bouzonville until the summer. His last known act as bishop is dated 25 March 1211. He died on 6 April 1212. At the time of his death, the diocese was at peace and unencumbered by debts. He was buried in the chapel of Notre-Dame-la-Tierce in the cathedral. His remains were discovered in 1914 and removed to the cathedral treasury. His original epitaph is still visible.

== Writings and literary influence ==
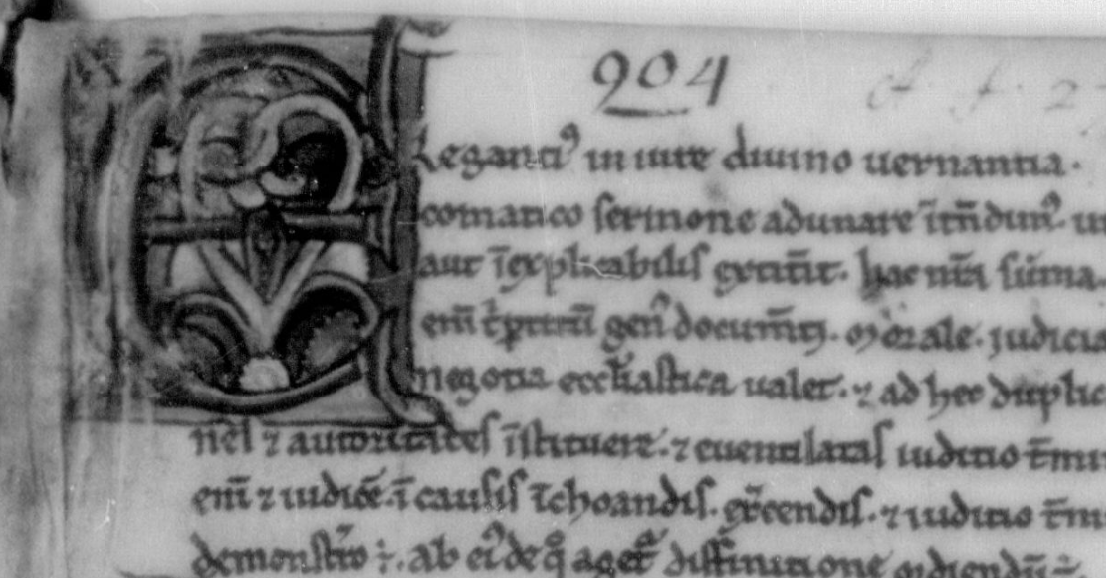
The start of the Summa Coloniensis in a 13th-century manuscript. The incipit is Elegantius in iure diuino and the decorated initial is thus E.

Bertram wrote a Latin accessus ad auctores to the final chapter, "De regulis juris", of Justinian I's Digest. (Note: This work has been edited.) He may also have written an encomium of Justinian and a glossary of legal terms that appear with his accessus in one manuscript. That he was the author of the summa called Antiquitate et tempore has been speculated. That he was the author of the summa called Elegantius in iure diuino (or Summa Coloniensis) is proved by an attributed quotation in Emo of Huizinge's chronicle.

His interest in legal matters is evident in two letters from Pope Innocent III dated 28 August 1206 responding to questions posed by Bertram regarding whether a Jewish convert in extremis could baptize himself (no) and whether a man who had been unlawfully but unknowingly married to a widow could be ordained a priest (yes). These answers found their way into Decretals of Gregory IX.

In 1189, Bertram ordered the first continuation of the Gesta episcoporum Mettensium, a history of the bishops of Metz down to 1131. Bertram's continuation brought it down to 1189.

John of Alta Silva dedicated his Dolopathos, a Latin version of the Persian tale of the Seven Wise Masters, to Bertram.

== Reputation ==
In the later Middle Ages and the early modern period, Bertram was regarded as a great legislator and the chief architect of Metz's unique republican constitution, a view espoused by Philippe de Vigneulles in the 16th century and Bishop Martin Meurisse in the 17th. This view has been modified by later historians, who recognize Bertram's resistance to the established families as paving the way for the republican constitution but stress his non-republican motives and the larger social forces at work in the Empire at the time.

Bertram was not held in such high esteem by his immediate successors as bishop. In 1260, when Bishop Jacques de Lorraine brought the Gesta episcoporum Mettensium down to his time, he did not add to the entry for Bertram's episcopate, leaving the final 23 years of it uncovered. In the 1370s, a revision of the Gesta finally added a notice of Bertram's death, but neither it nor the French translations, the Chronique des Evesques de Mets, added any information on the years 1190–1212.
