= Peter of Brixey =

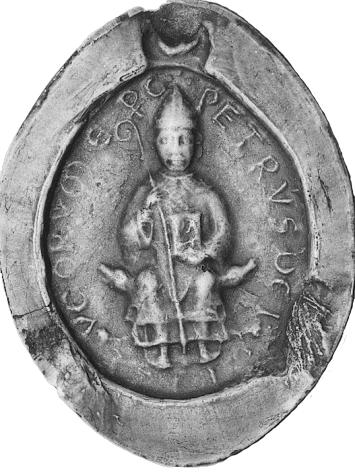
Seal of Peter of Brixey, Bishop of Toul. The mitered bishop sits on a curule throne with a crosier in his left and a book in his right hand. Motto: PETRVS DEI GRACIA LVCORVM EPC (Peter by the Grace of God Bishop of the Leuci)

Peter of Brixey (French: Pierre de Brixey, Brixei, German: Peter, Petrus von Brixey) (died 1192) was Bishop of Toul from 1167 to 1192, and one of the few bishops of Lorraine to be a supporter of the Holy Roman Emperor Frederick Barbarossa in the late twelfth-century phase of the Investiture Controversy.

== Biography ==
Peter was the son of Peter, Count of Brixey, and Matilda of Rinel (Risnel, Rinelle). He was made a canon of Toul in 1152, then archdeacon in 1156. In 1165, the previous Bishop of Toul, Henry I of Lorraine, died; two years later, Peter was elected to succeed him, and consecrated by Hillin of Falmagne, Archbishop of Trier, of whom he was a suffragan.

Thereafter, he put an end to the war between Frederick IV of Dampierre, Count of Toul, and the cathedral canons, and by 1177 had rebuilt the castle of Liverdun, destroyed in the strife, making it and the associated town a nexus of power in the diocese. In order to lure settlers, he offered a charter of freedom to the local community, the first to be issued in Lorraine. In 1178, Peter received the right to mint his own coinage from the Emperor.

In the succeeding years, he himself came into conflict with the powerful Matthias I, Duke of Lorraine, who sought to gain the rents of the church of Toul for his son, Theoderic, Bishop of Metz; Peter appealed the case to Alexander III, but the Pope was unable to intervene due to his ongoing struggle with Barbarossa. Nevertheless, on the death of the Count of Toul without issue, Peter entrusted the lordship of the county to Matthias's youngest son (also named Matthias). Thereafter, he busied himself with founding several monastic communities, at Liverdun in 1184, at Rinel in 1185, and at Commercy in 1186.

Peter was a strong supporter of the interests of Barbarossa, both paying numerous lengthy visits to the imperial court and himself playing host in Toul to the Emperor twice, in 1171 and at Pentecost of 1187. When Hillin's pro-Staufen successor, Arnold I of Vaucourt, died in May 1183, and the succession came into dispute between Folmar of Karden, the candidate of the pro-papal party, and Rudolf of Wied, the imperial candidate, Peter supported the latter, refusing to receive Folmar in Toul when the latter returned from Rome in 1186 as a Papal Legate armed with the judgment of Pope Urban III. Shortly thereafter, Peter was excommunicated by Folmar at a hastily assembled provincial synod in Mouzon.

Peter himself hastened to Rome, arriving just in time to assist at Urban's funeral. Urban's successor Gregory VIII nullified Peter's excommunication in a bull issued on November 30, 1187, whereupon Peter returned to his diocese, which he set himself to putting in order.

Peter is listed among the numerous nobles and prelates to have attended the great Diet of Pentecost in Mainz (May 20-22) of 1184, and was almost certainly among the many bishops attending the Diet of Christ in Mainz on March 27, 1188, where his imperial master took the cross, for he himself shortly followed the imperial army to the Holy Land in 1189 in the company of Gutbert, Lord of Apremont; Henry, Count of Salm; and Garsires and Regnier of Montreuil. While he was to be absent, he named his nephew Frederick, Dean of Toul, and the abbot of Saint Aprus of Toul vicars general of the church of Toul. In 1191, he was present at the Siege of Acre, having arrived in the company of Henry II, Count of Champagne. After the Treaty of Jaffa between Saladin and Richard the Lion-Heart was signed on September 2, 1192, allowing Christians free access to Jerusalem, he made his way there, where he died and was buried.

== Footnotes ==
Catholic Church titles
Preceded by Henry I of Lorraine	Bishop of Toul; 1167-1192	Succeeded by Odo of Lorraine
