= Theoderich von Wied =

German Archbishop and Prince-elector

Theoderich of Wied
- Archbishop of Trier
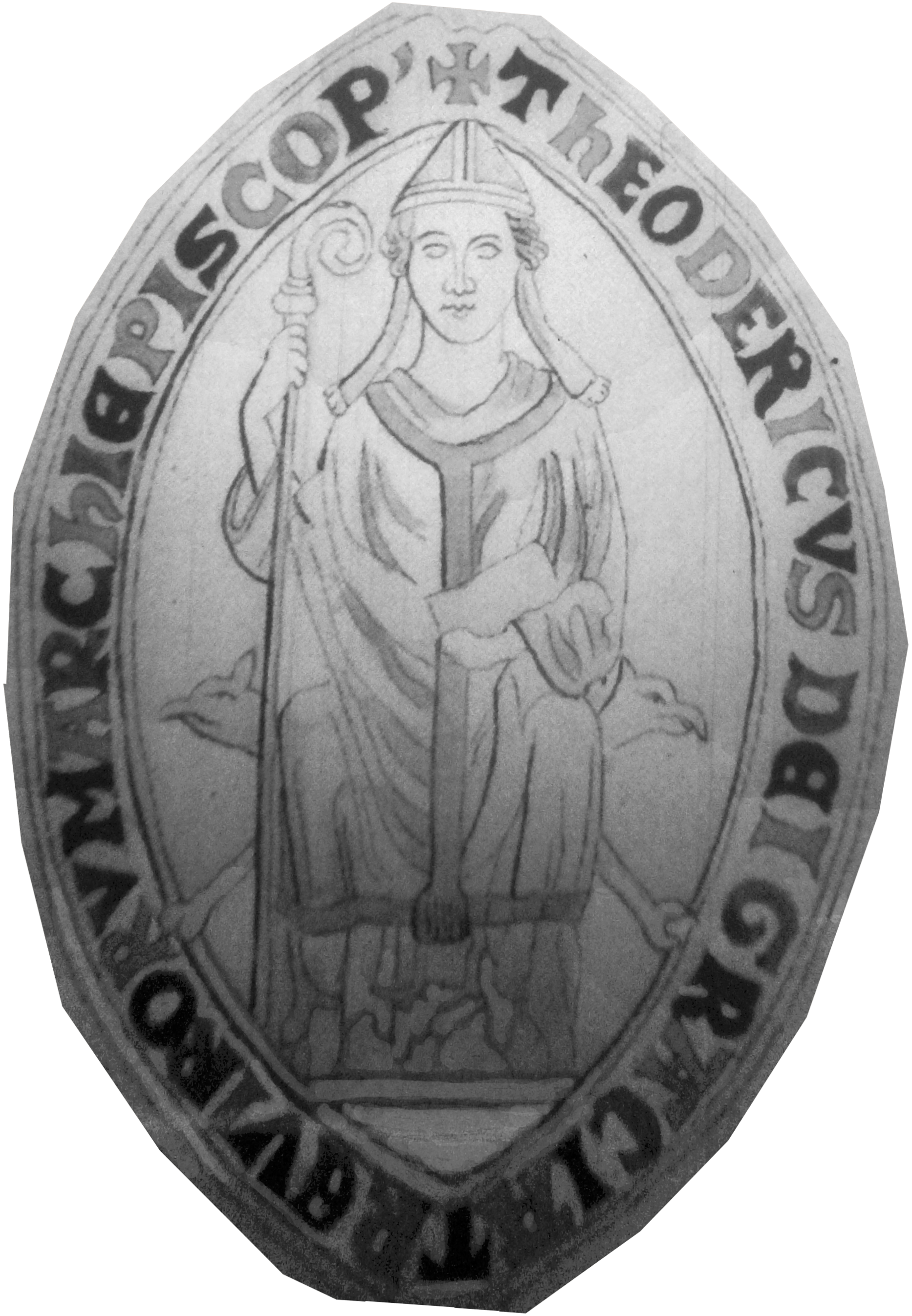
- Seal of Archbishop Theoderich of Trier
- Elected: 1212
- Term ended: 28 March 1242
- Predecessor: John I of Speyer
- Successor: Arnold II of Isenburg

Personal details
- Born: c . 1170
- Died: 28 March 1242 Trier
- Buried: Cathedral of Trier
- Denomination: Roman Catholic

Theoderich von Wied (also called Dietrich of Wied or Theodoric II; c. 1170 – 28 March 1242) was Archbishop and Prince-elector of Trier from 1212 until his death.

== Life ==
=== Early life ===
He was the son of Dietrich, count of Wied (died about 1200), a follower of Emperor Frederick Barbarossa in the Third Crusade. His brother Rudolf, Theoderich's uncle, was already elected Archbishop of Trier in 1183, however, he was denied by Pope Lucius III who favoured his rival Folmar of Karden. Theoderich's older brother, George, inherited the county of Wied.

Theoderich began his ecclesiastical career about 1189; from about 1196, he served as provost of St. Kunibert's in Cologne, from 1205 also of Rees on the Lower Rhine. In 1210 he is documented as archdeacon at Trier and provost of St. Paulinus' Church.

Elected archbishop upon the death of his predecessor John I on 15 July 1212, he soon entered into a fierce quarrel with the Rhenish count Henry II of Nassau over the erection of Montabaur Castle on the right bank of the Rhine. Henry had the fortress devastated and the archbishop arrested, nevertheless Theoderich was able to finish the construction two years later.

=== Political activity ===
Like his ancestors, he remained a loyal supporter of the Imperial House of Hohenstaufen, backing the young king Frederick II against his Welf rival Otto IV, which earned him the opposition of his counterparts in Cologne and Mainz. He also ensured the election of Frederick's son Henry (VII) as King of the Romans in 1220 and his coronation by Archbishop Engelbert of Cologne two years later. He remained a close confidant of the emperor, whom he accompanied to Italy and Sicily, and also of His son Henry (VII) until his rebellion in 1234.

=== Episcopal activity ===
Under Theoderich's rule, construction was begun on the rebuilding of Liebfrauenkirche (Church of Our Lady) in approximately 1230 AD. He consecrated Limburg Cathedral in 1235 AD. He also promoted the establishment of the Order of Saint John in Trier. In 1216, he requested the founding of a Teutonic Order commandry in Koblenz (at the later Deutsches Eck). He acquired the Eifel estates around Malberg and had Kyllburg Castle erected about 1240.

Theoderich was buried in the Cathedral of Trier.

Catholic Church titles
Preceded by John I	Archbishop of Trier; 1212–1242	Succeeded by Arnold II von Isenburg
