= Folmar of Karden =

Archbishop of Trier

- Archbishop of Trier
- Elected: 25 May 1183
- Term ended: 26 June 1189
- Predecessor: Arnold I
- Successor: John I
- Other post: Papal Legate

Orders
- Consecration: 1 June 1186 by Urban III

Personal details
- Born: ca. 1135
- Died: ca. November 1189 Northampton
- Denomination: Roman Catholic

Folmar of Karden (ca. 1135 – 1189), also occurring in the variant forms Fulmar, Vollmar, Volcmar, Formal, or Formator, was the Archbishop of Trier from 1183 and the last not also to be a prince elector. He opposed the emperor in the late twelfth-century phase of the Investiture Controversy. The historian Bernhard von Simson characterized Folmar as "that restless, ambitious, and hard-hearted man."

== Biography ==
=== Early career ===
Possibly a relation of the Counts of Bliescastel, Folmar was provost in the city of Karden on the Moselle, and became an archdeacon in Trier and Metz.

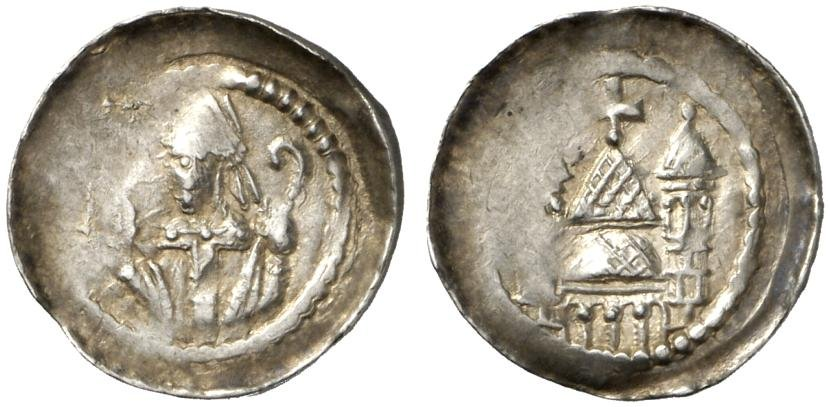
Silver denier of the Archbishop of Trier, issued ca. 1186-1189 by the cathedral chapter. Obverse shows the mitered archbishop with a crosier; reverse shows two towers and a roofed apse surmounted by a cross, probably representing the cathedral. (This coin is identified as representing either Rudolf of Wied or Folmar of Karden, more likely the former.)

=== Election ===
On the death on May 25, 1183 of the previous archbishop, the pro-Staufen Arnold I, the succession came into dispute between Folmar, the candidate of the pro-papal party, Henry III, Duke of Limburg (the Vogt of the church of Trier) and other local nobles, the citizens, and the smaller part of the clergy; and the Provost of Trier, Rudolf of Wied, the candidate favored by the emperor Frederick Barbarossa and the greater part of the canons and prelates present for the election. After a certain amount of intriguing by various factions, Folmar was elected archbishop by a part of the cathedral chapter and by popular acclaim in 1183; Lucius III somewhat dubiously ratified the election after the Synod of Verona. Nevertheless, the Emperor had Rudolf formally invested as anti-archbishop. Folmar proceeded to Italy, where the case was argued inconclusively before the Roman Curia. At length, Folmar was consecrated by Pope Urban III in Verona on Whit-Sunday (June 1) of 1186.

=== Dispute ===
He hastened to return in disguise from Italy, pausing in Toul, where Bishop Peter of Brixey, a suffragan of Trier and an adherent of Barbarossa's, refused to receive him; he fared better with Bishop Bertram of Metz, who received him as his metropolitan with a solemn procession. Unable to proceed to Trier, which was held by the adherents of Rudolf, Folmar set out for his erstwhile home in the Abbey of Saint-Pierremont (German: Abtei Petersberg) in Avril, then in the territory of Count Theobald I of Bar; thence he immediately began to issue edicts against Rudolf and his supporters. Strife arose in the bishopric between the followers of Folmar and Rudolf, to the point that Philip II of France had to obtain from Barbarossa the release of a French Cistercian who had been transmitting Folmar's letters on the condition that no such messengers would be allowed to leave France again. Folmar's claim was strengthened by the support of the Archbishop of Köln, Philip of Heinsberg, who erected a fortress in Zeltingen to that purpose, and by Folmar's appointment to the position of Papal legate. In 1187, Folmar called a provincial synod in Mouzon, which duly pronounced the excommunications of Peter of Brixey and Bishop Henry of Verdun. (These excommunications were nullified by a bull of Gregory VIII issued on 30 November 1187.) Armed clashes between the two factions became common, and it was said that the violence in the diocese was a fulfillment of the baleful prophecies of Hildegard of Bingen.

=== Exile, Deposition, and Death ===
Folmar proceeded to France, until through the influence of Barbarossa he was expelled by Philip Augustus, and then departed to the Angevin territory of Henry II of England, where he was received and honorably maintained at the royal expense in the Augustinian Priory of St. Cosmas (French: Prieuré de Saint-Cosme) at La Riche near Tours; on 7 July 1189 he took part in Henry's sepulture at Fontevraud Abbey and departed thence to London, where, according to Roger of Hoveden's Chronicle, "Formalis Treverensis archiepiscopus" was among those prelates concelebrating the coronation of King Richard I of England on September 3, 1189, subsequently (September 15-16) attending a royal council at Pipewell. In view of the devastation of the archbishopric and the fact that neither he nor his competitor Rudolf ever gained full possession of the see, both had been deprived by Pope Clement III in a papal bull of June 26, 1189; Folmar died the same year, still in exile, at Northampton. The schism was ended in 1190 with the consecration of John, Archdeacon of Speyer and Provost of the monastery of St. Germain, as John I.

== In popular culture ==
Folmar is among a number of historical characters depicted in the 2013 German historical novel, Das Salz der Erde (German: The Salt of the Earth) by Christoph Lode (writing under the name "Daniel Wolf").

== Footnotes ==
Catholic Church titles
Preceded by Arnold I of Vaucourt	Archbishop of Trier; 1183-1189	Succeeded by John I
