= Arnold II of Isenburg =

Archbishop of Trier (c. 1190–1259)

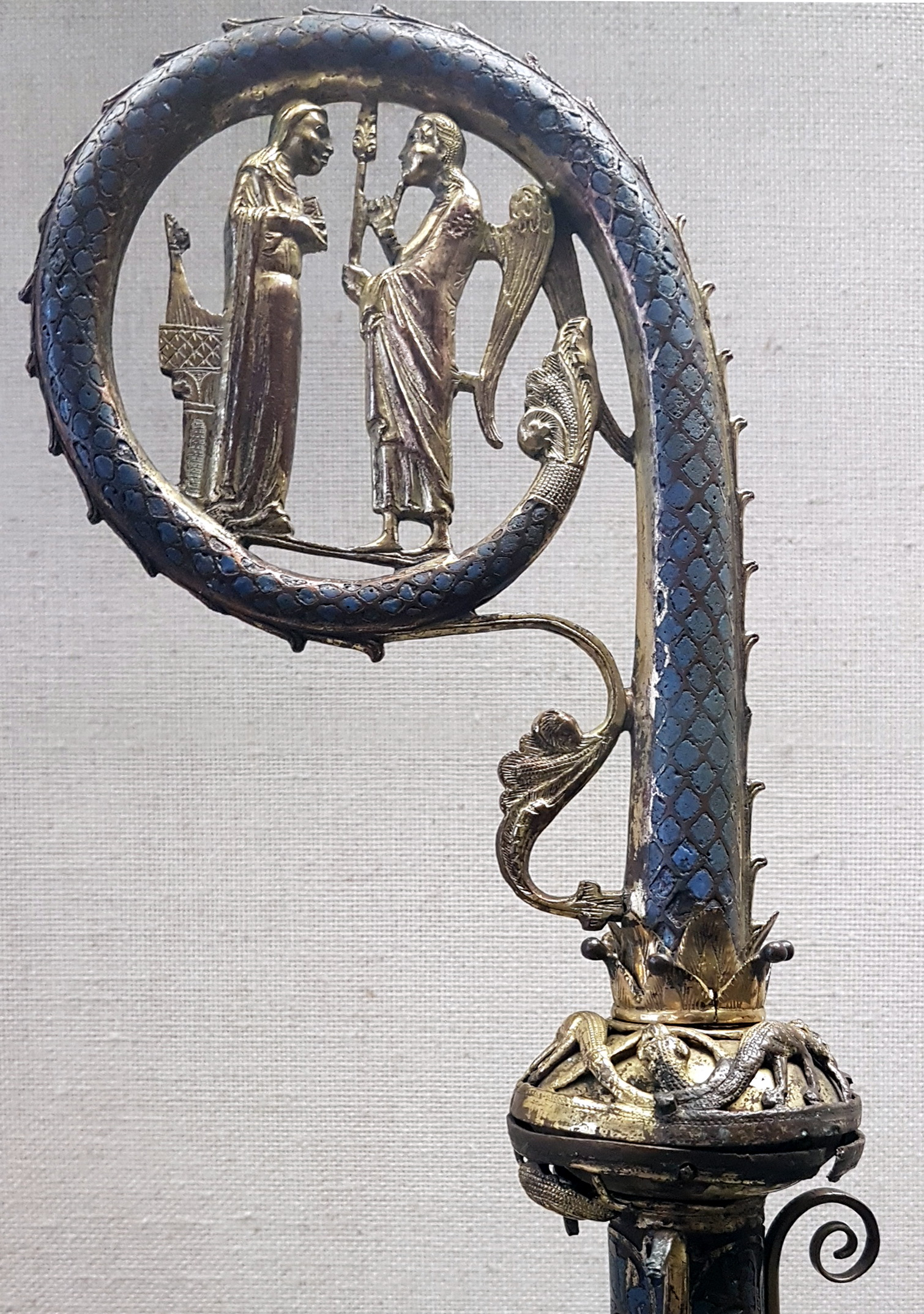
Crosier of Arnold II, from the Trier Cathedral Treasury

Arnold II of Isenburg (c. 1190–1259) was Archbishop of Trier from 1242 to his death. A long-time member of the cathedral chapter in Trier, he held several provostships before being elected as archbishop, succeeding his uncle Theoderich von Wied. The election was controversial, and king Conrad IV of Germany granted the regalia to Rudolf de Ponte, the opposing candidate, instead. A short military conflict ensued, and the dispute ended after Rudolf's death when Arnold was confirmed as archbishop by Pope Innocent IV and consecrated in 1245.

Arnold opposed Conrad and the Hohenstaufen claim to the throne, and elected Henry Raspe and later William II of Holland as German anti-kings. During his reign, he fortified several towns and built various castles. He died in Montabaur in early November 1259 and is buried in Trier Cathedral.

== Early life and career ==
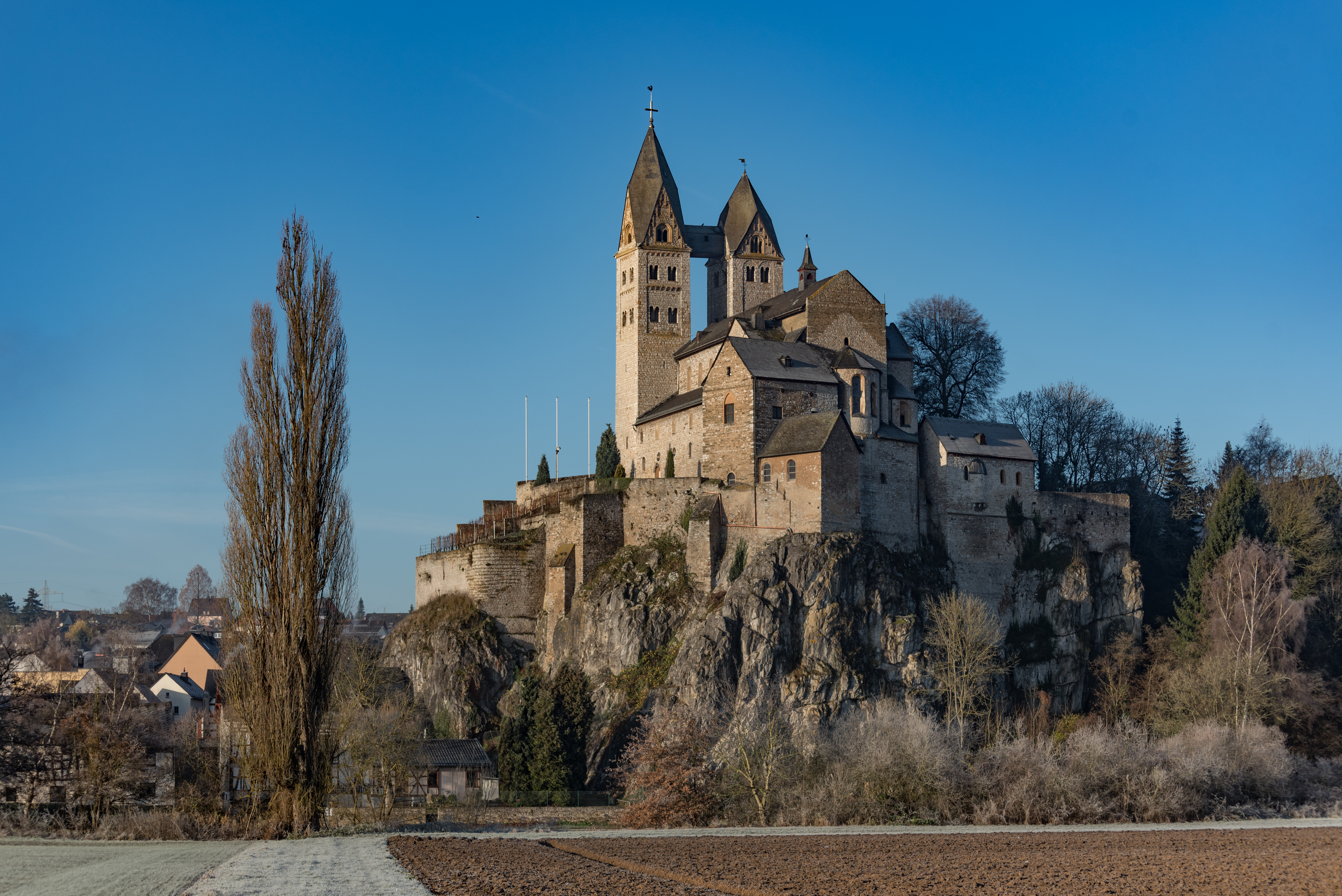
St Lubentius, Dietkirchen, Limburg

Arnold was born c. 1190 into one of the most significant noble families of the Westerwald region. His father was Bruno I of Isenburg-Braunsberg and his mother was Theodora von Wied, the sister of Theoderich von Wied, who was Archbishop of Trier 1212–1242. His cousin was Siegfried III, archbishop of Mainz; another likely relative was Konrad von Hochstaden, archbishop of Cologne. Arnold was probably educated at the cathedral school in Cologne and spoke Italian. Before c. 1210, he became a member of the cathedral chapter in Trier, where he was cellarer from 1212. Arnold obtained leading positions in the Electorate of Trier: he became archdeacon of St. Lubentius in Dietkirchen in 1217 and cathedral provost in 1228. The provostship at the cathedral was the second highest position in the diocese after the episcopal seat. It had become vacant upon the death of Rudolf de Ponte (senior). Arnold's main competitor for this position was another member of the de Ponte family, also called Rudolf, who was given the provostship of St Paulin instead in order to ascertain Arnold's election. Before 1220, Arnold became provost of St Gangolf (Mainz); from 1236, he was provost of St Mary at Erfurt and of St Castor in Koblenz.

== Election as archbishop ==
In 1242, the Hohenstaufen king Conrad IV of Germany, son of Emperor Frederick II, Holy Roman Emperor, visited Trier during Lent. At this time, the archbishops of Mainz and Cologne were no longer loyal to the Hohenstaufen dynasty, but Theoderich of Wied still supported the Emperor. When a soldier attempted to seize Siegfried von Honeck, a supporter of the archbishop of Mainz, in Arnold's house, Honeck killed the soldier. A tumult ensued, and Arnold retreated into the episcopal palace. Theoderich died on 28 March 1242 and Arnold was elected as his successor by the majority of the cathedral chapter. This was the first episcopal election in Trier where only the cathedral chapter could vote, in contrast to previous elections where other nobility and clerics had been involved. A significant minority of parties opposed to Arnold chose the St Paulin provost, Rudolf de Ponte, as the new archbishop. King Conrad then granted the regalia to Rudolf but was unable to provide further support. After a short military conflict, in which some counts and dukes including Henry V, Count of Luxembourg fought against Arnold, Rudolf gave up his claim and settled for his previous provostship and some financial compensation. The dissent continued until Rudolf's 1244 death. In 1243, Arnold's opponents attempted to declare his election as uncanonical in a trial in Rome. Pope Innocent IV confirmed Arnold as archbishop in January 1245 and sent him the pallium. Arnold was consecrated as bishop in June 1245 by the archbishops of Mainz and of Cologne together with Roger de Mercy, the bishop of Toul.

== Archbishop of Trier ==
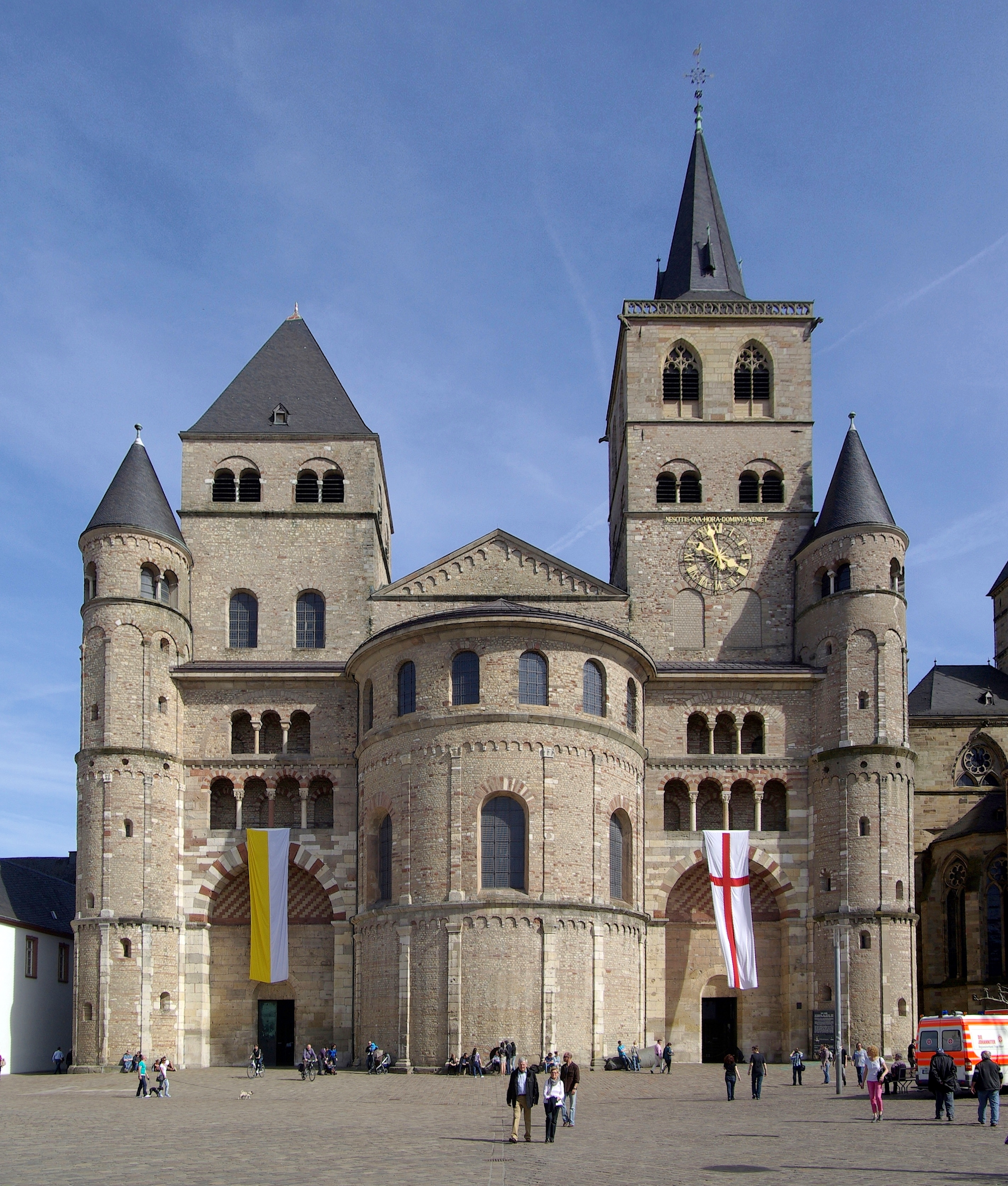
Trier Cathedral

Arnold supported Henry Raspe as anti-king of Germany, who was elected on 22 May 1246 by the archbishops of Mainz and of Cologne. A minority of sources also claim that Arnold participated in this election. After Henry's death, the archbishops voted for William II of Holland as his successor in 1247. Arnold supported William from 1249, allowing him the use of his fortress at Ehrenbreitstein. He was with William's armies at Mainz in a confrontation with Conrad IV in 1250, and accompanied him to see Pope Innocent IV in Lyon at Easter 1251. Arnold translated the Pope's Good Friday speech from Italian to German for the German nobility.

In the 1257 Imperial election, Arnold chose Alfonso X of Castile, while the other archbishops voted for Richard of Cornwall. This also led to military conflict with the Archbishop of Mainz, Gerhard I. von Dhaun, with the Trier troops defeated by Mainz at Boppard in May 1257.

During his reign, Arnold tried to increase the power of the archbishop, and built fortifications at Trier, Münstermaifeld, Koblenz and Hartenfels as well as castles including Bischofstein Castle and Stolzenfels Castle. His favourite residence was at Ehrenbreitstein. Arnold's methods for financing his activities, which included tolls and credits, but also withheld money from other clerics, as well as the lack of diocesanal synods under his reign led to criticism by the cathedral chapter and other influential Trier clerics, who wrote an open letter on 10 February 1257 mentioning admonitions that had been publicly read in the cathedral.

During Arnold's tenure, only one excommunication is documented, unlike the frequent use of excommunication under his predecessor. The Liebfrauenkirche and St. Maximin's Abbey were completed during his reign. Arnold died in Montabaur in early November 1259 and is buried in Trier Cathedral, opposite of his predecessor.

Catholic Church titles
Preceded by Theoderich von Wied	Archbishop of Trier; 1242–1259	Succeeded by Heinrich II of Finstingen
