= Priory of St. Cosmas (La Riche) =

Priory in Indre-et-Loire, France

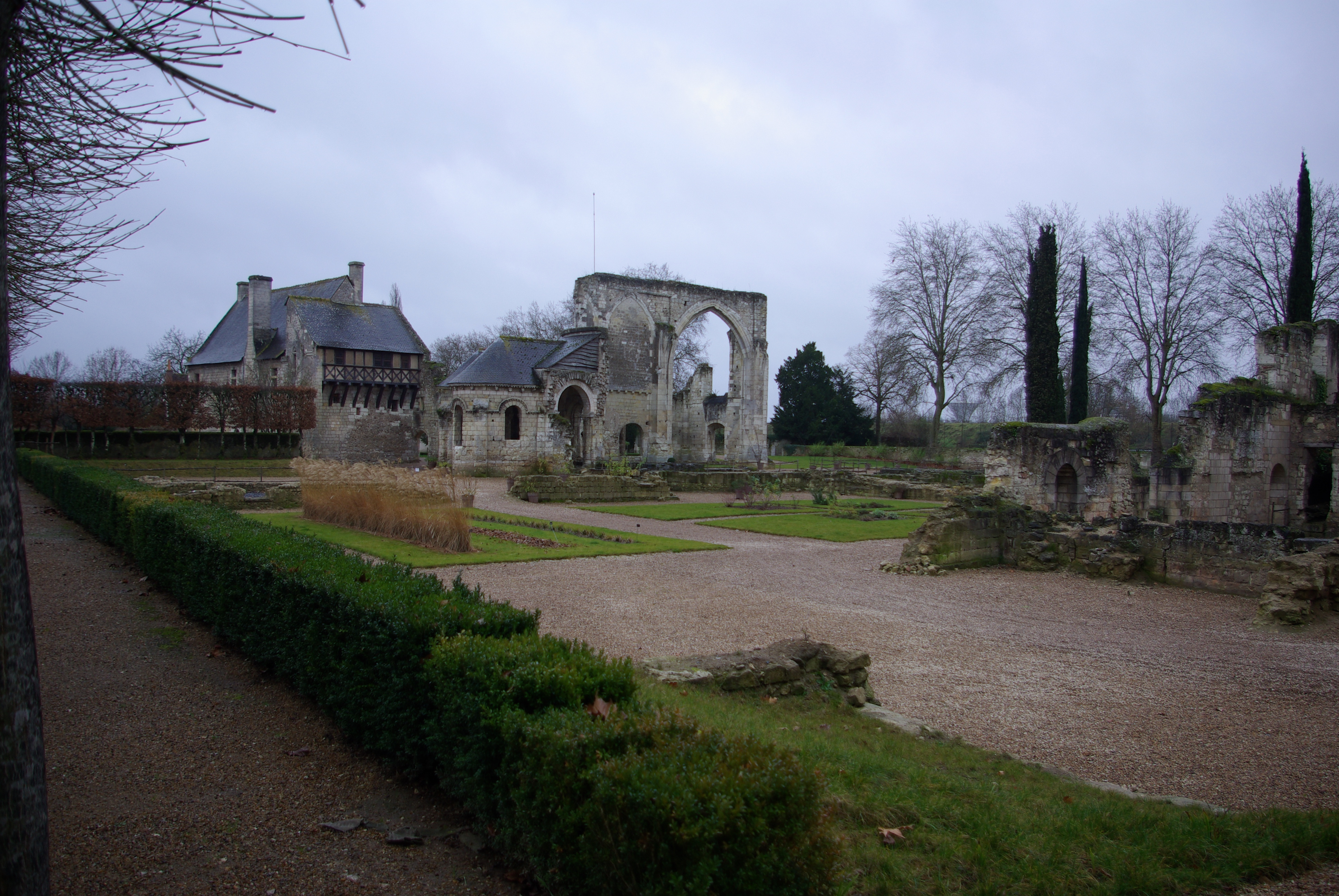

Religion
- Affiliation: Roman Catholic
- Province: Archdiocese of Tours
- Region: Centre-Val de Loire
- Rite: Augustinians
- Year consecrated: 1092

Location
- Location: La Riche, France
- Country: France
- Interactive map of Priory of St. Cosmas
- Coordinates: 47°23′20.96″N 0°39′4″E

Architecture
- Type: Monastery
- Style: Romanesque and Gothic

Website
- http://www.prieure-ronsard.fr

The Priory of St. Cosmas (French: Prieuré de Saint-Cosme) or the Priory of Ronsard is a former priory built upon an island in the river Loire at La Riche near Tours in Touraine, founded in the 11th century and dedicated to St. Cosmas. The site features a museum dedicated to the French poet Ronsard, who spent the last twenty years of his life among the Canons Regular there.

== History ==
In 1092 the priory was founded on the site of a 7th-century oratory by a community of Augustinian Canons Regular to accommodate pilgrims on the way to the shrine of St. James of Campostela in Spain, a purpose it served up to the 18th century.

In 1187, King Henry II of England (in whose dominions it was at the time) allowed the priory to be used as a refuge for the exiled Archbishop of Trier, Folmar of Karden, at a time when the priory was considered "a heaven on earth that eased the journey to the real heaven."

In the 15th century, the priory benefitted from the generosity of King Louis XI of France who dwelt at times at the neighboring Château de Plessis-lèz-Tours. He rebuilt the church and the Prior's House in the Gothic style.

From 1565 to 1585 Pierre de Ronsard (the "Prince of Poets") became the "Commendatory Prior" of the community. He lived in the Prior's House (now a museum dedicated to his life) and there received visits from Catherine de Médicis and her son, King Charles IX of France, as well as the future king Henry III of France and others. At his decease on the 27 December 1585 at the age of 61 he was buried in the choir of the priory church, where his tomb was found in the 1930s.

In 1742 the priory was suppressed and in part dismantled. The site was bombed during the Second World War and partly destroyed. Nothing remains but the Prior's House, the ruins of the church, and the refectory.

== A Heritage Site ==
In 1951 the General Council of Indre-et-Loire undertook an important recovery of the area, and then opened the site to the public.

From 1988 on nine gardens have been either created or restored and denominated "Outstanding Gardens" (French: Jardins remarquables). The garden at St. Cosmas is over 2 hectares in area, and boasts 200 different varieties of roses of every description in honor of Ronsard. With these are mingled an important collection of lavender, lilies, irises, peonies, and shrubs of diverse forms and varieties.

The French poet and critic Daniel Leuwers chose the priory as the site for the preservation and display of his conceptual "Poor Books."

From June 2009 to the end of January 2010 it was the site of important archaeological excavations.

In 2011 the painter Zao Wou-Ki was invited by the General Council of Indre-et-Loire to create 14 stained glass windows for the priory refectory.

In 2013, an exhibition entitled "Ecstasies" (French: Extases) by the French poster artist Ernest Pignon-Ernest displayed seven posters depicting women in a state of rapture, as well as the preparatory drawings for them.

== Gallery ==
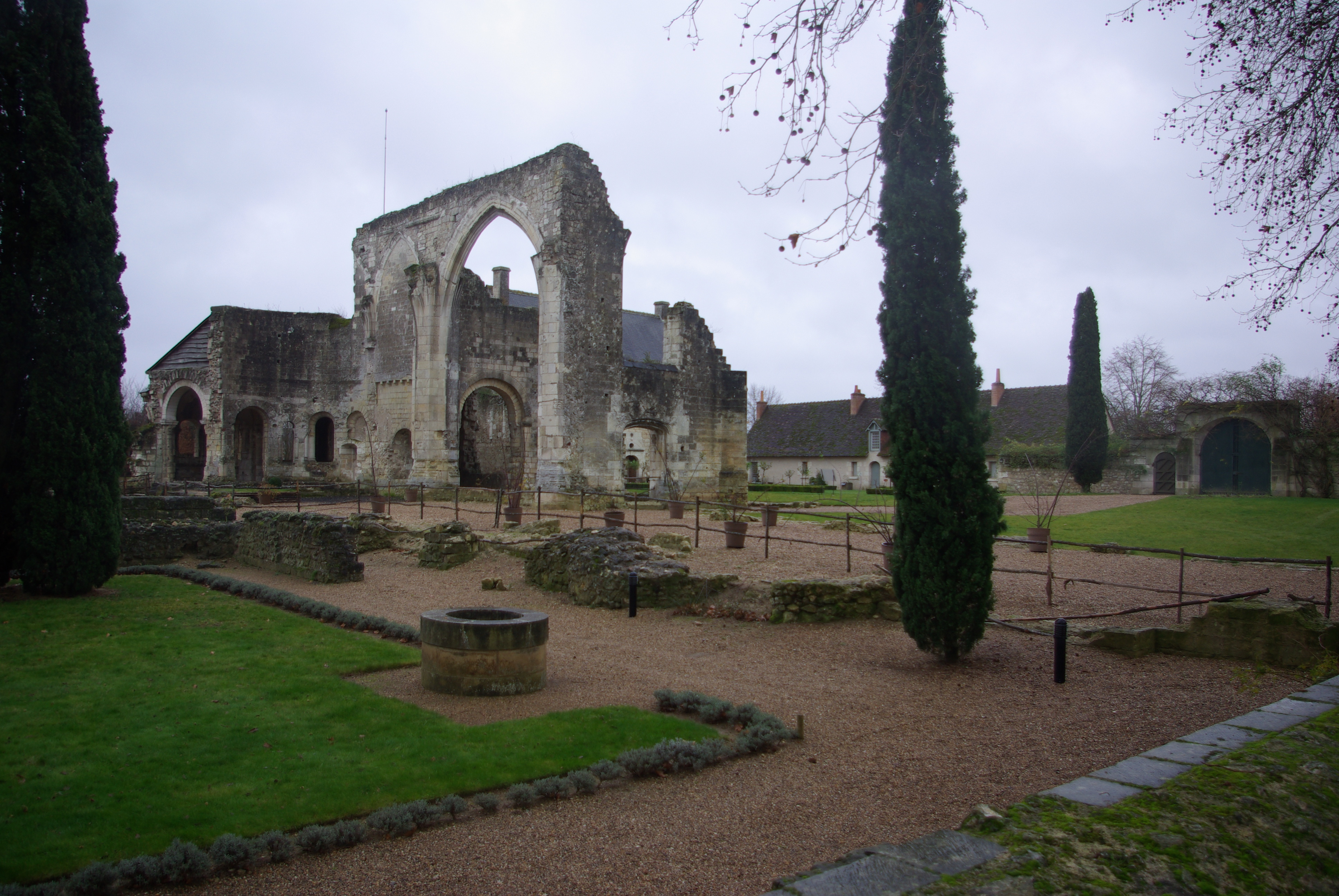

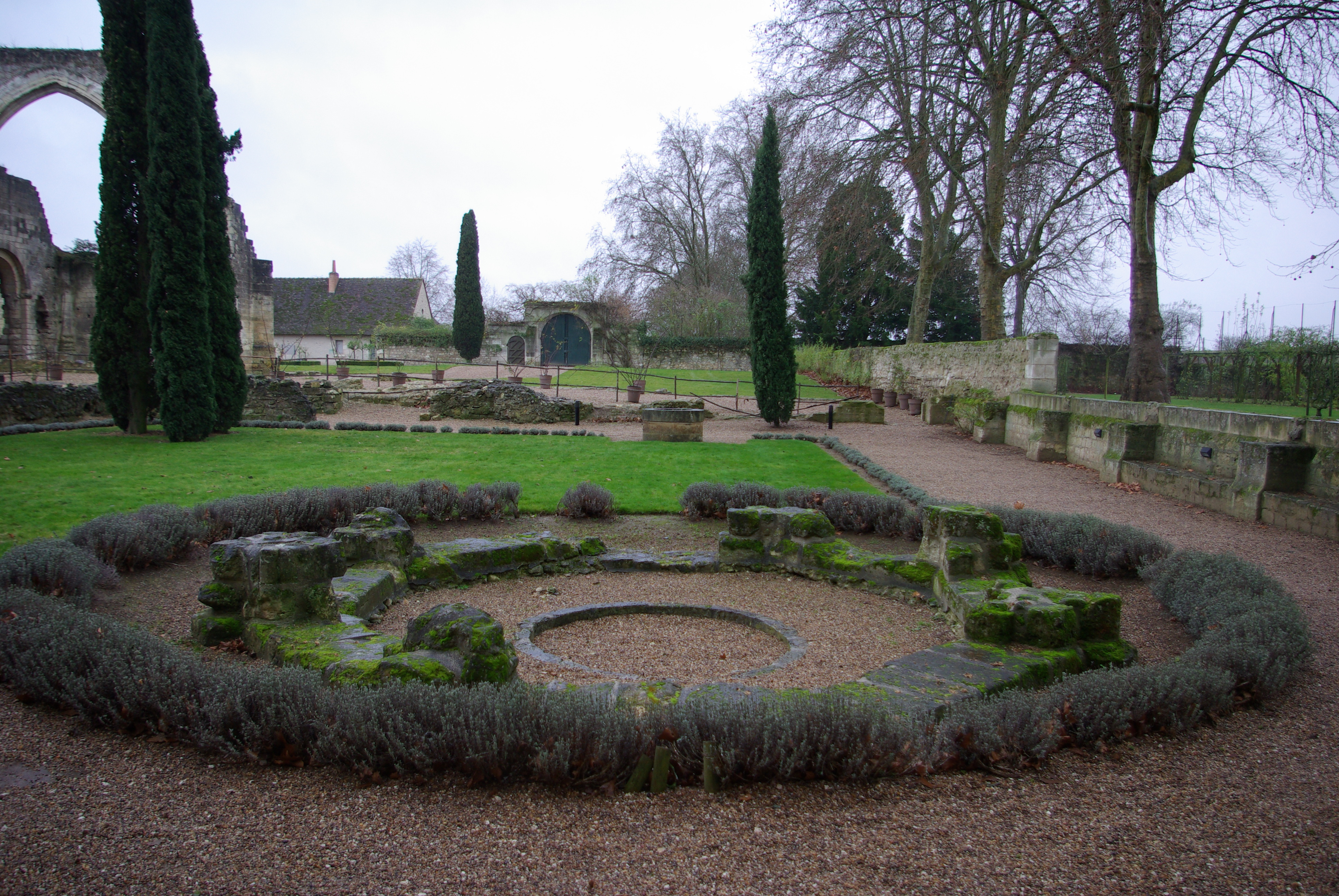

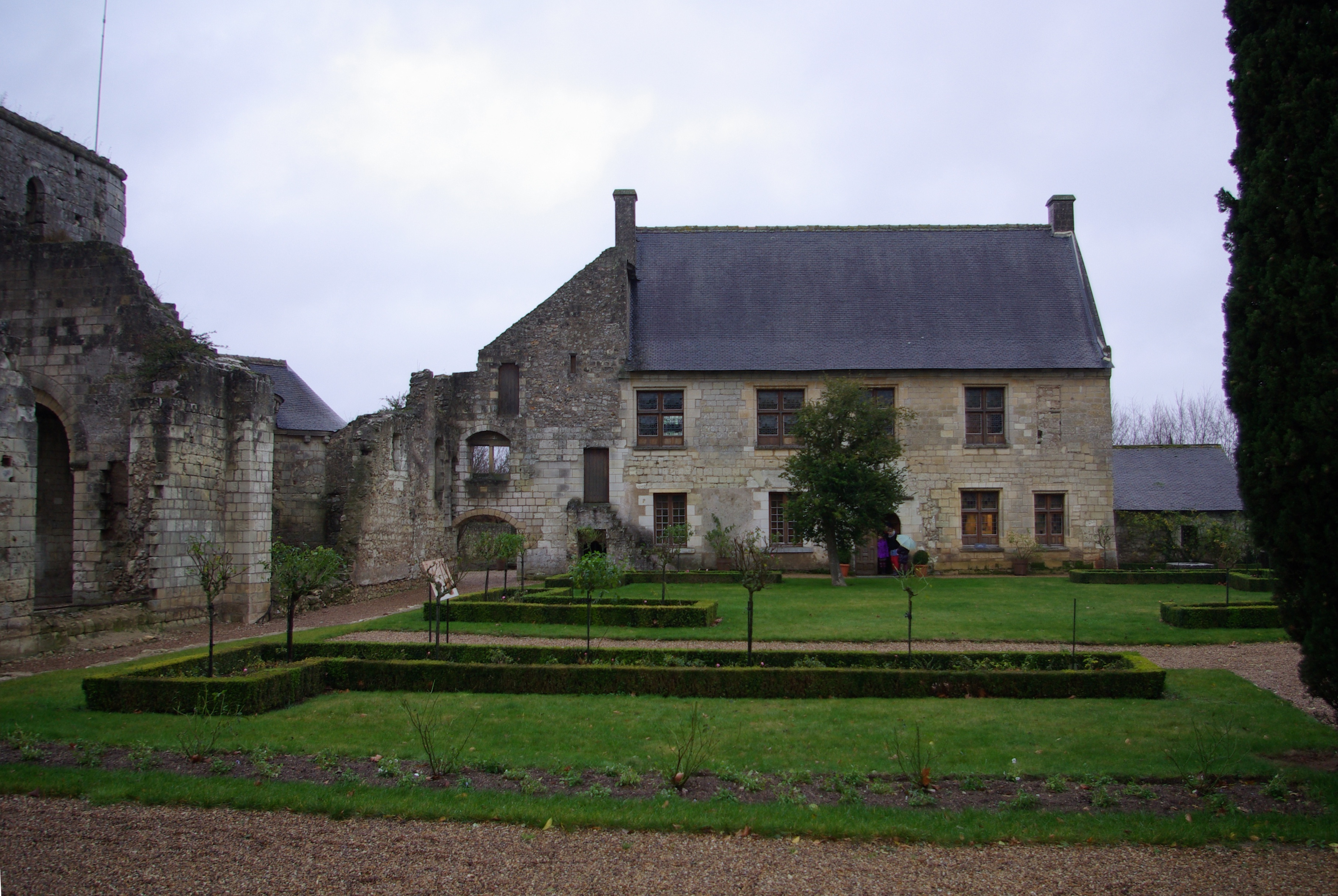

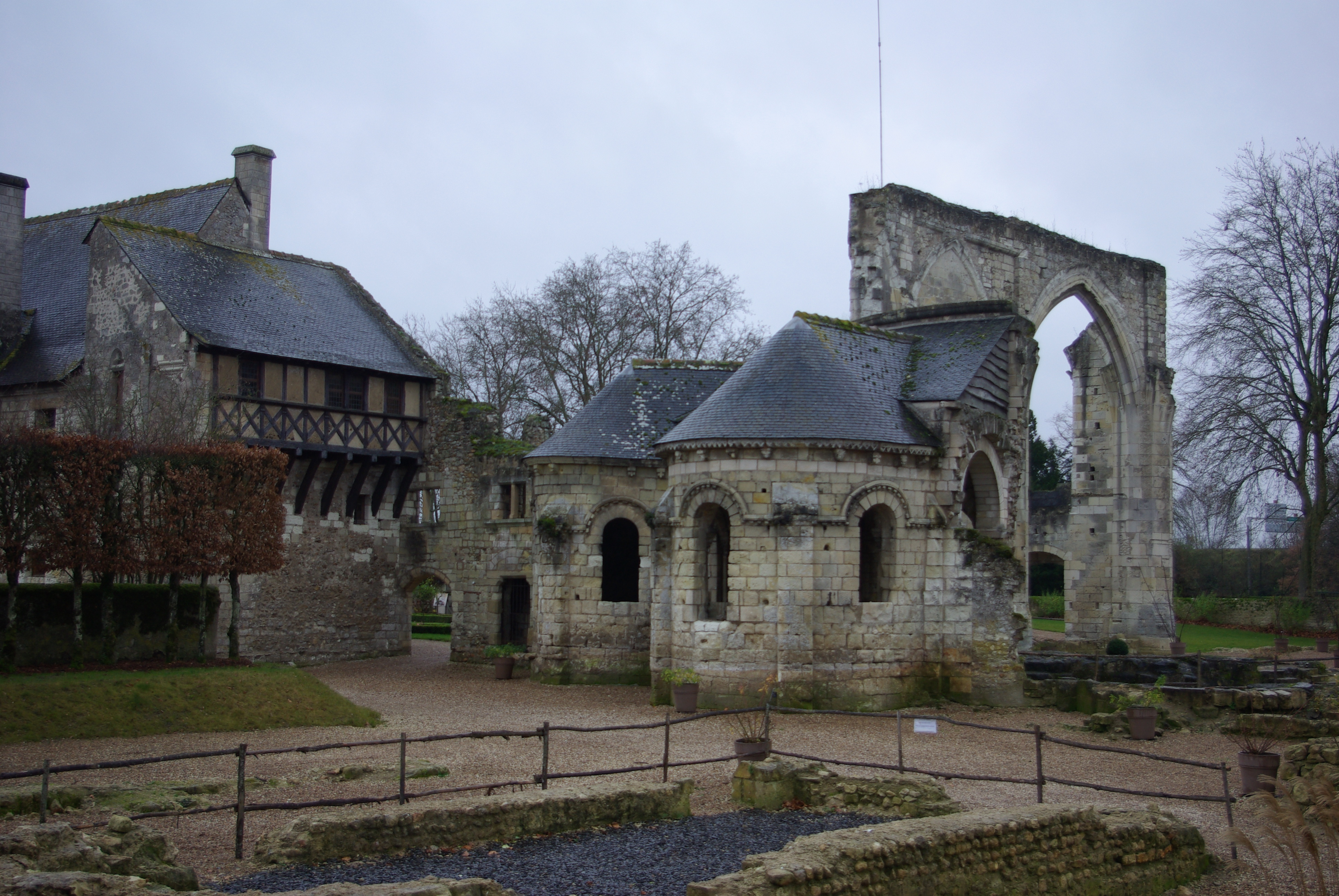

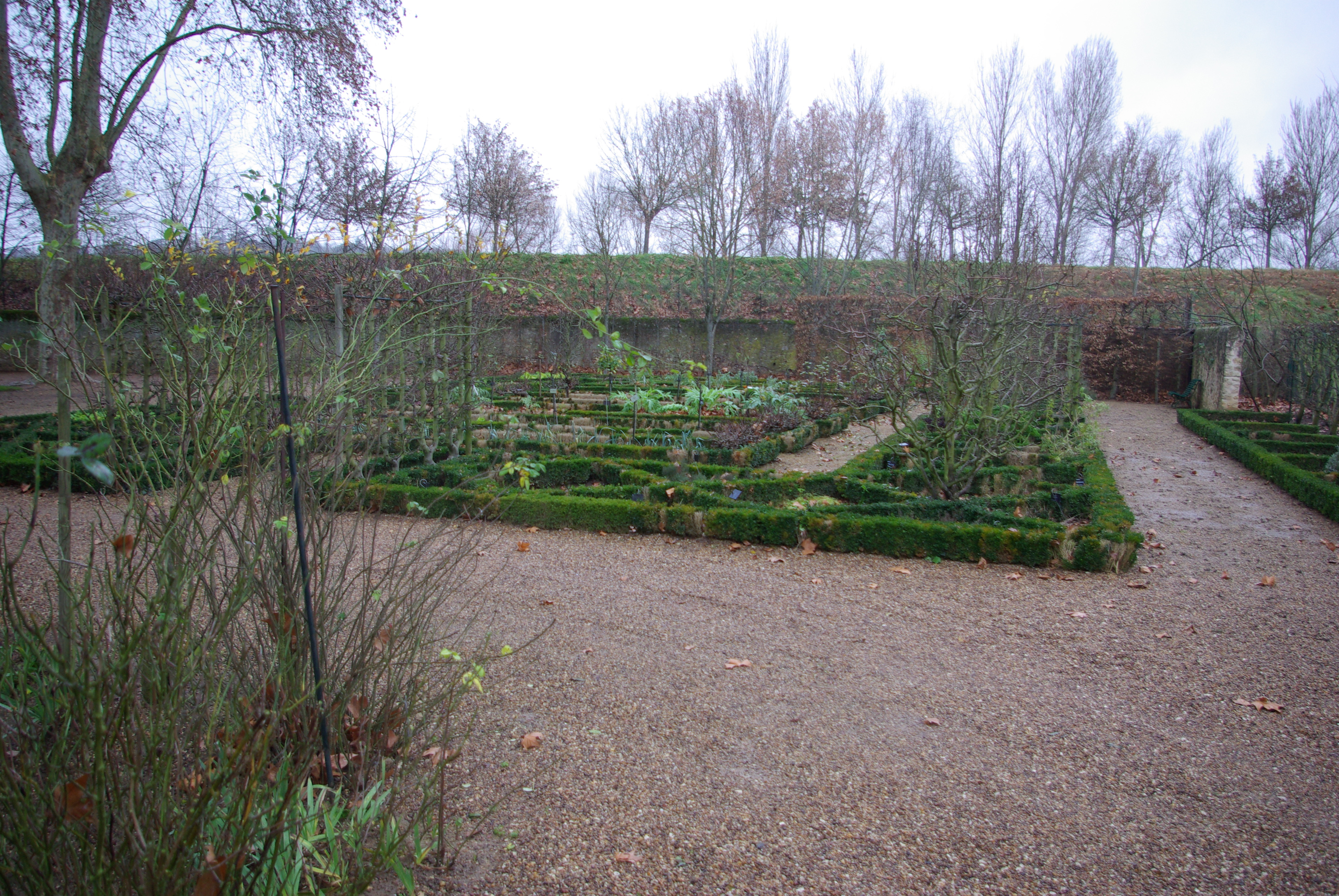

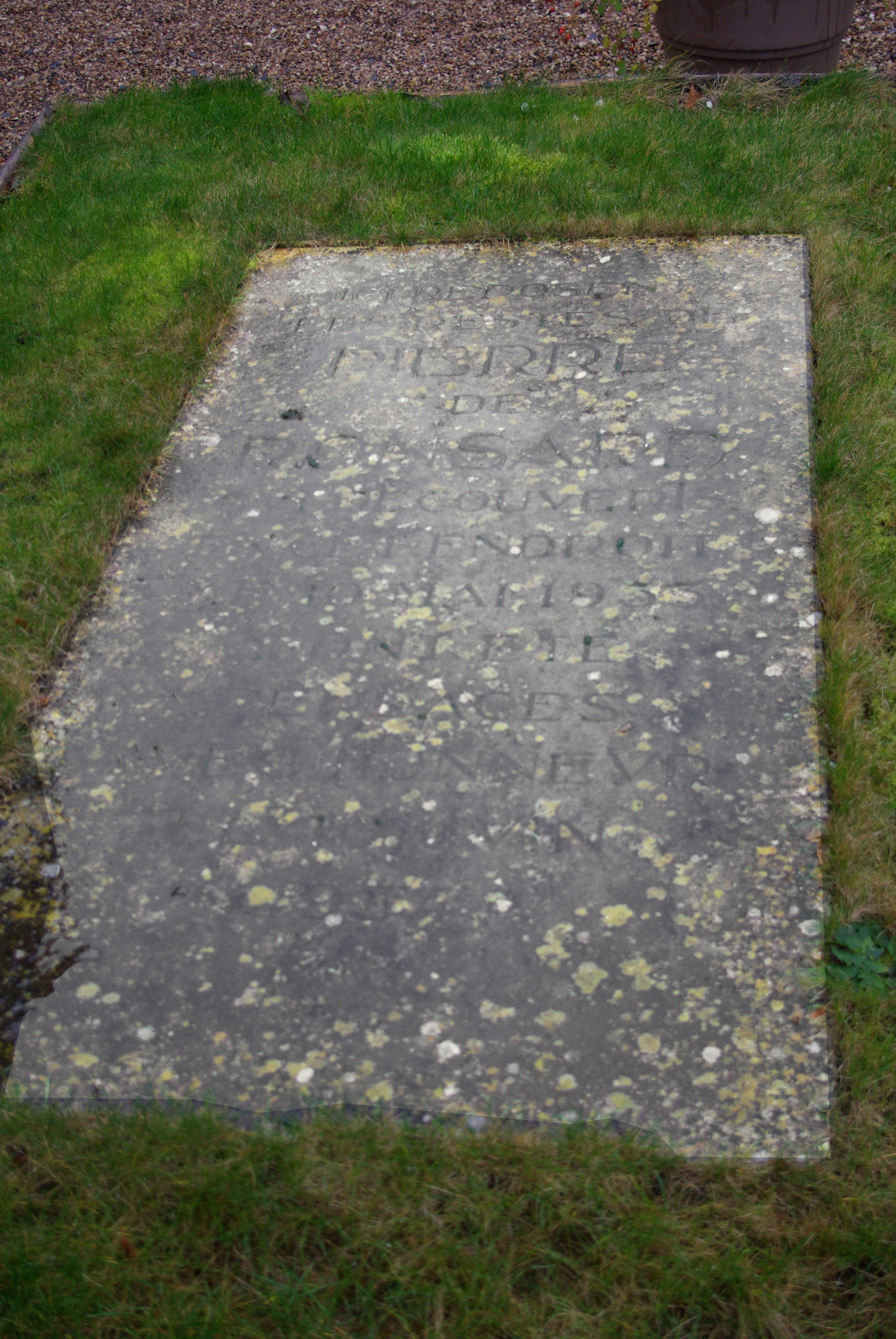
