= Liebfrauenkirche, Trier =

Church of Our Lady
- Liebfrauenkirche
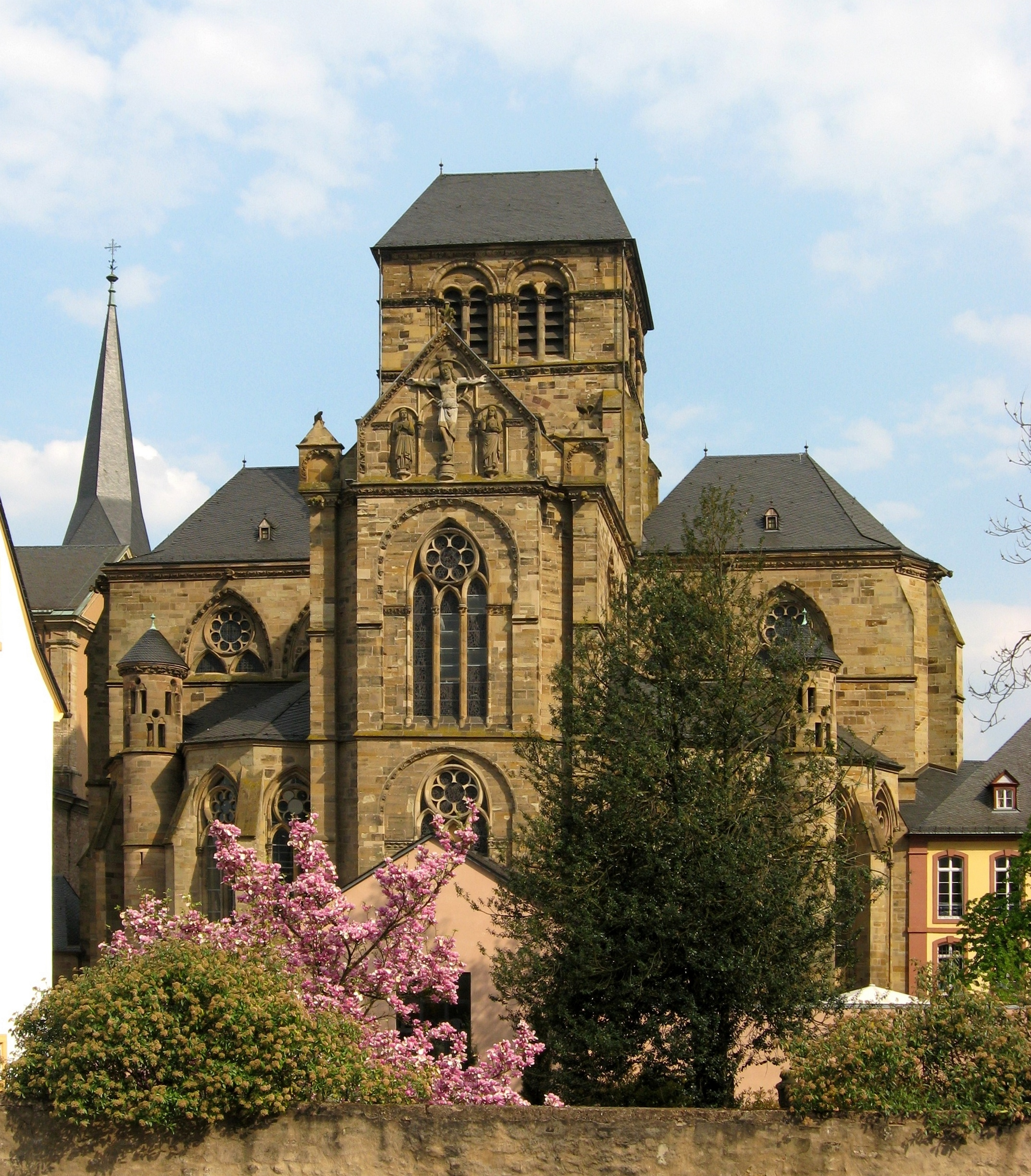

Religion
- Affiliation: Roman Catholic
- Diocese: Diocese of Trier
- Ecclesiastical or organisational status: Minor basilica

Location
- Location: Trier, Rhineland-Palatinate, Germany
- Interactive map of Church of Our Lady
- Coordinates: 49°45′21″N 6°38′35″E

Architecture
- Type: Church
- Style: Gothic
- Groundbreaking: c. 1230 AD
- Completed: 1260 AD

Website
- liebfrauen-trier.de

UNESCO World Heritage Site
- Official name: Church of Our Lady (Liebfrauenkirche)
- Part of: Roman Monuments, Cathedral of St Peter and Church of Our Lady in Trier
- Criteria: Cultural: (i), (iii), (iv), (vi)
- Reference: 367-009
- Inscription: 1986 (10th Session)

The Liebfrauenkirche (German for Church of Our Lady) in Trier, is, according to UNESCO, "the earliest church built in French High Gothic style outside France." It is designated as part of the Roman Monuments, Cathedral of St Peter and Church of Our Lady in Trier UNESCO World Heritage Site. The Trier Dom (cathedral) is next to it, and the two buildings share a common wall.

== History ==
A Roman double church originally stood here. According to the church parish website, the Roman Emperor Constantine (272–337) made a large endowment in 326 AD that led to the first church construction there.

After the southern portion had become dilapidated by around 1200, Archbishop of Trier Theoderich von Wied (1170–1242) hired French builders from Champagne, who completely replaced it with the Early Gothic Church of Our Lady (Liebfrauen).

The exact date of the start of construction can no longer be determined, however a painted inscription inside on a column in the church reads: "The construction of this church was started in 1227 and ended in 1243" (German: "Der Bau dieser Kirche ward angefangen im Jahr 1227 und geendigt im Jahr 1243".). However, it is currently thought construction began in 1230.

Around 1260, the building was probably finished. In 1492, a high peak was placed on the central tower, which was named because of its high technology and degree of craftsmanship perfection. The high peak can be seen on the city dating, but was destroyed in a storm on Heimsuchungstag (2 July) in 1631. Subsequently, a hipped roof emplaced, which was destroyed in the Second World War. It was first replaced in 1945 by a roof and then by a steeper one in 2003.

On 13 July 1951 Pope Pius XII designated the church a minor basilica, and in 1986 it was added to the UNESCO World Heritage List as part of the Roman Monuments, Cathedral of St Peter and Church of Our Lady in Trier UNESCO World Heritage Site.

== Architecture and structure ==
Round Cruciform Floorplan

The Liebfrauenkirche, built next to the cathedral, shares with it a wall and a cloister.

A special feature of the basilica is its atypical cruciform floor plan as a round church, whose cross-shaped vaulting with four corresponding portals in rounded niches is completed by eight rounded altar niches so that the floor plan resembles rose, a symbol of the Virgin Mary, one of whose poetic titles is Rosa Mystica. The rose's twelve petals suggest the twelve tribes of Israel and the Twelve Apostles. The apostles as well as the twelve articles of the Apostles' Creed are painted on the twelve supporting columns, completely visible only from one spot marked by a gold star.

Though nothing above the surface is Roman any longer, there are extensive excavations (not open to the public) underneath the church and several of the Gothic pillars stand on top of Roman column foundations.

== Gallery ==
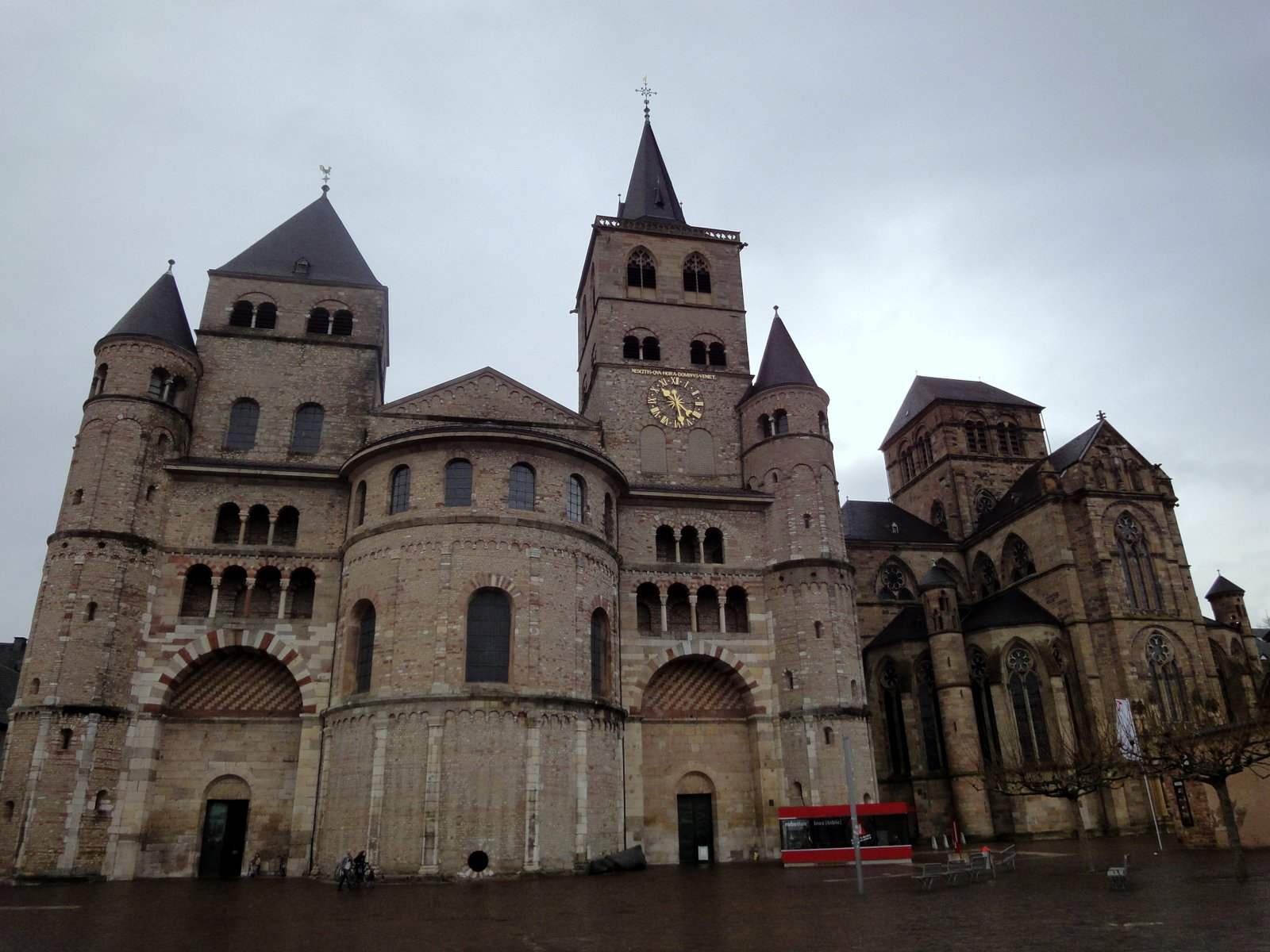
Liebfrauenkirche with dom (cathedral)

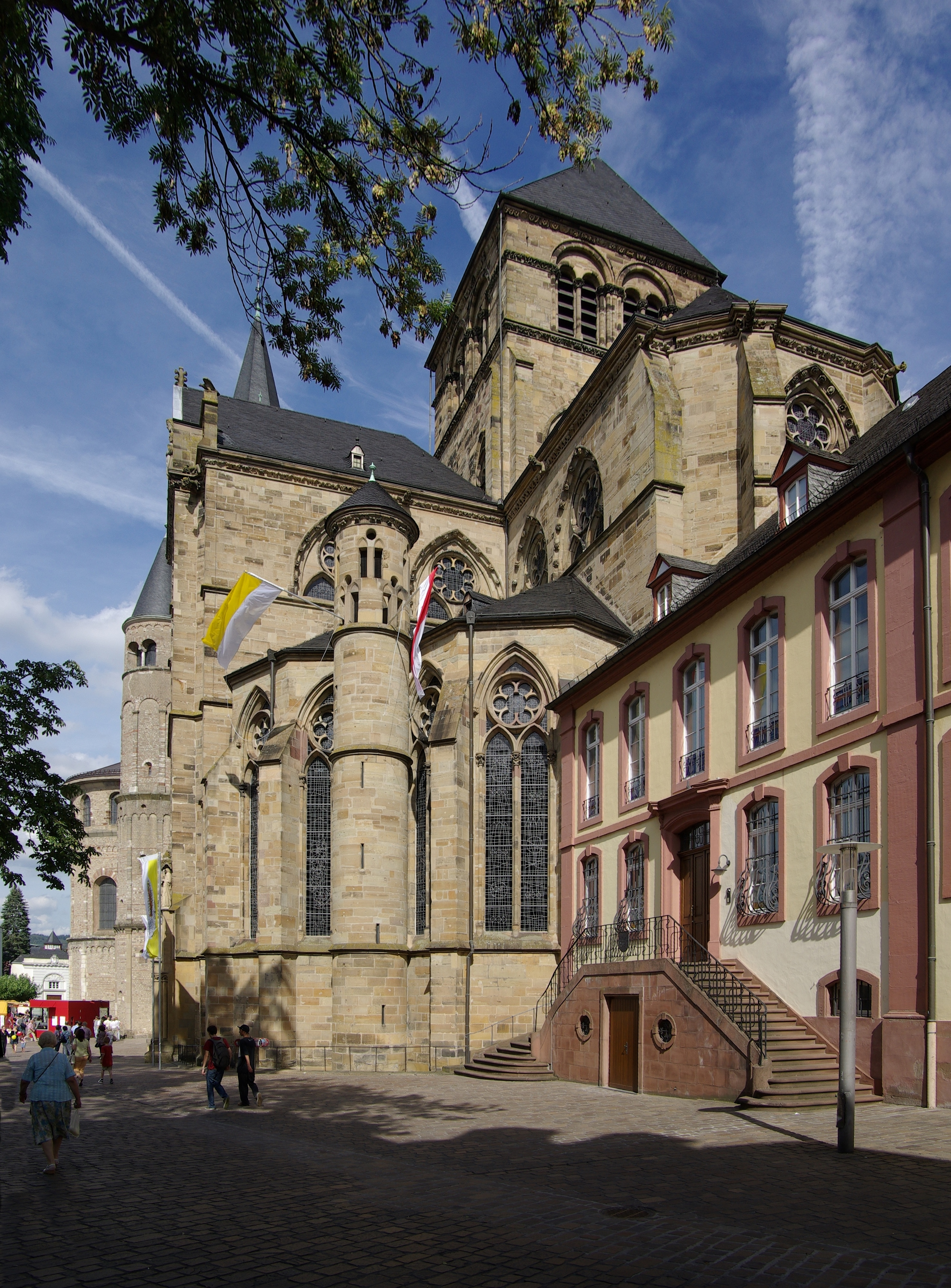
Exterior of Liebfrauenkirche

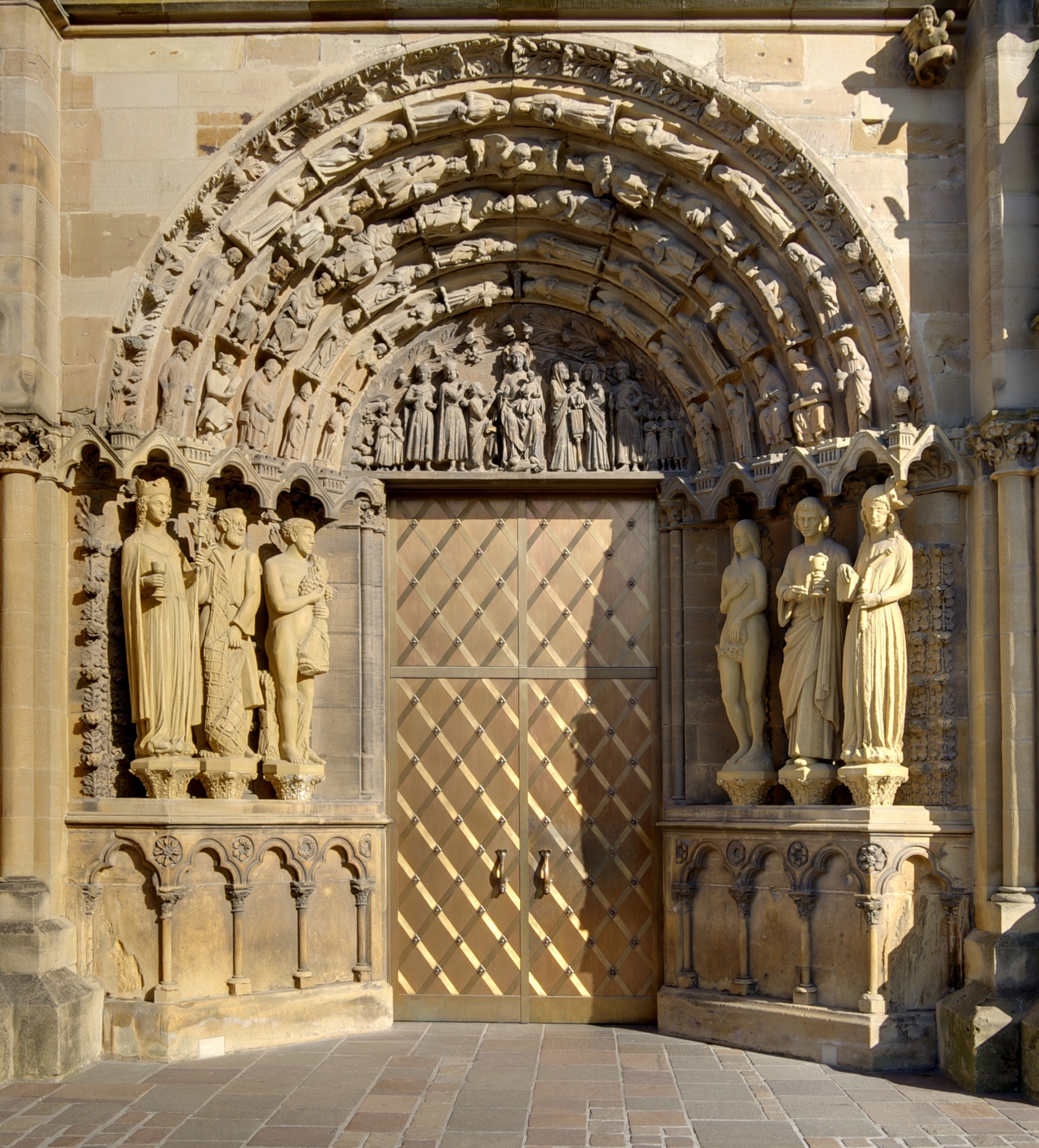
Main portal

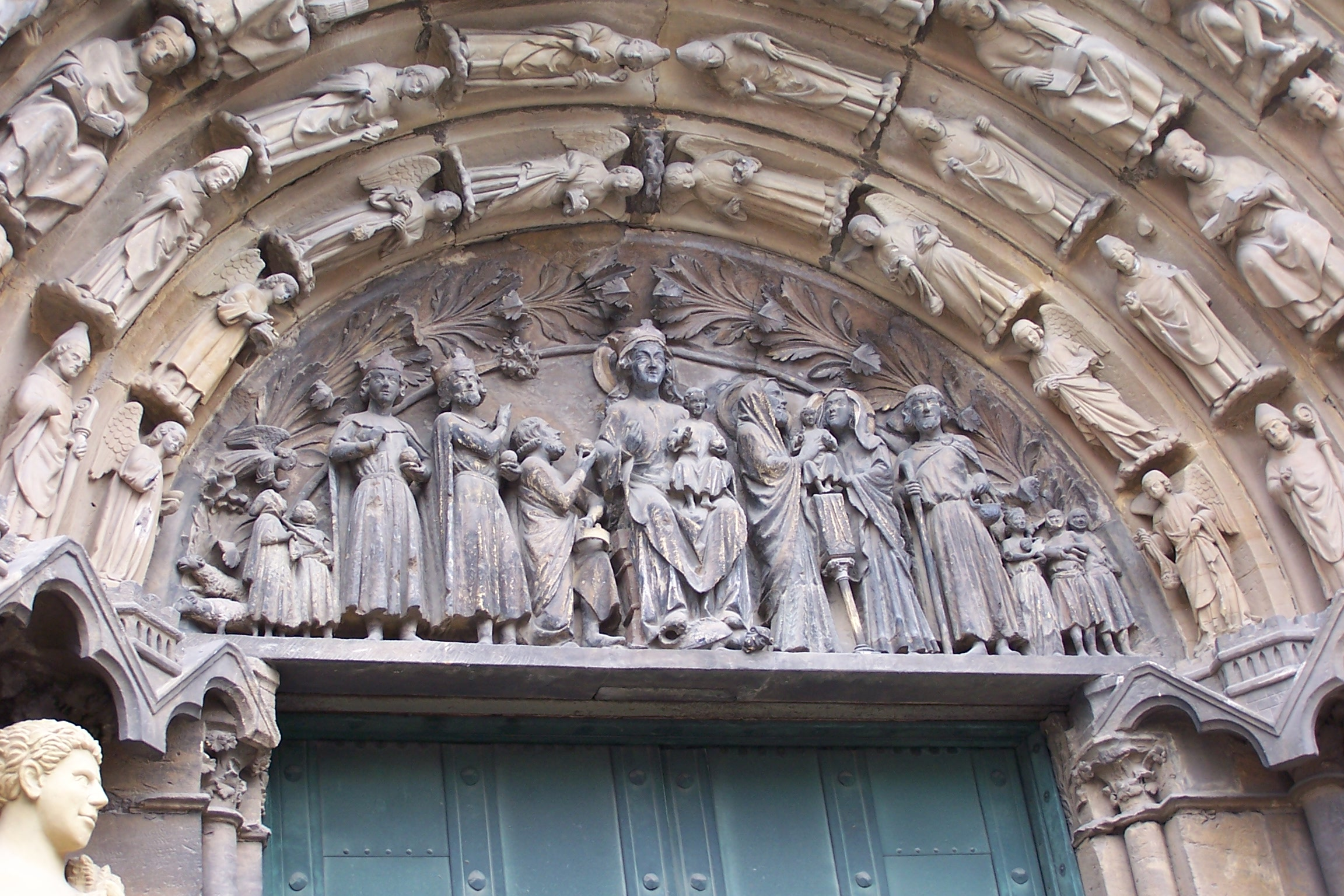
Tympanum of west portal

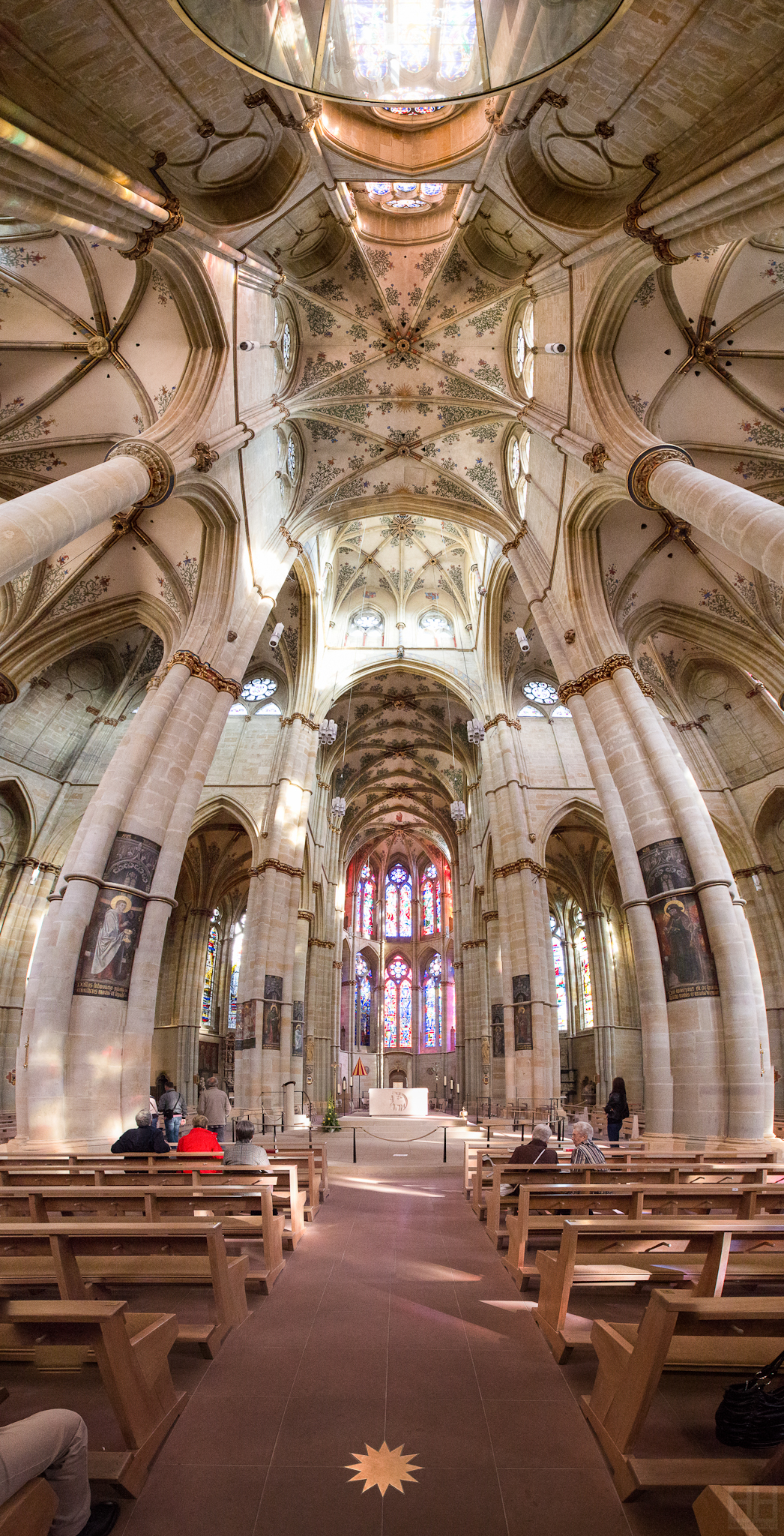
Interior panorama view

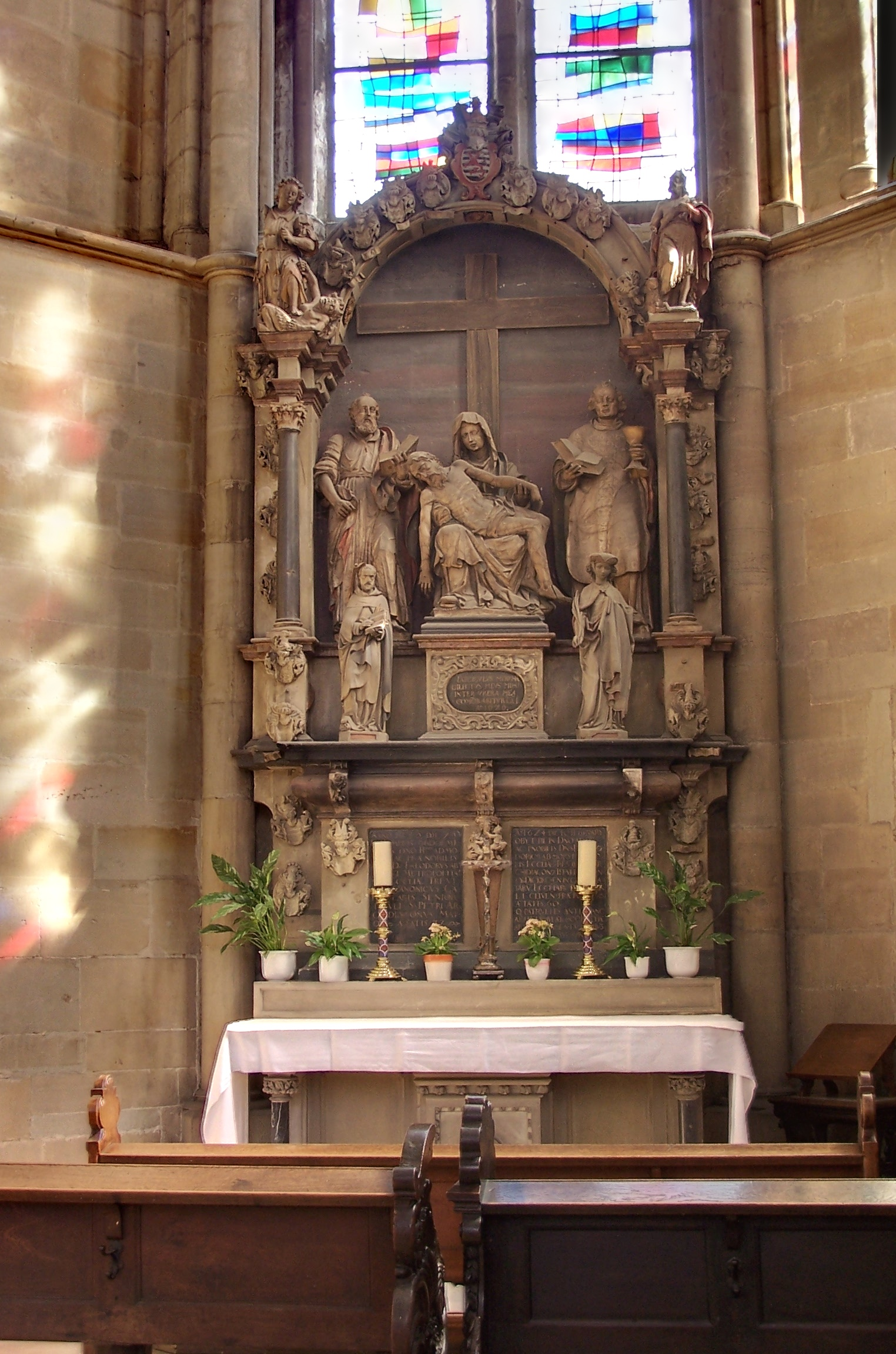
Tomb altar of Theodor and Theoderich von Horst

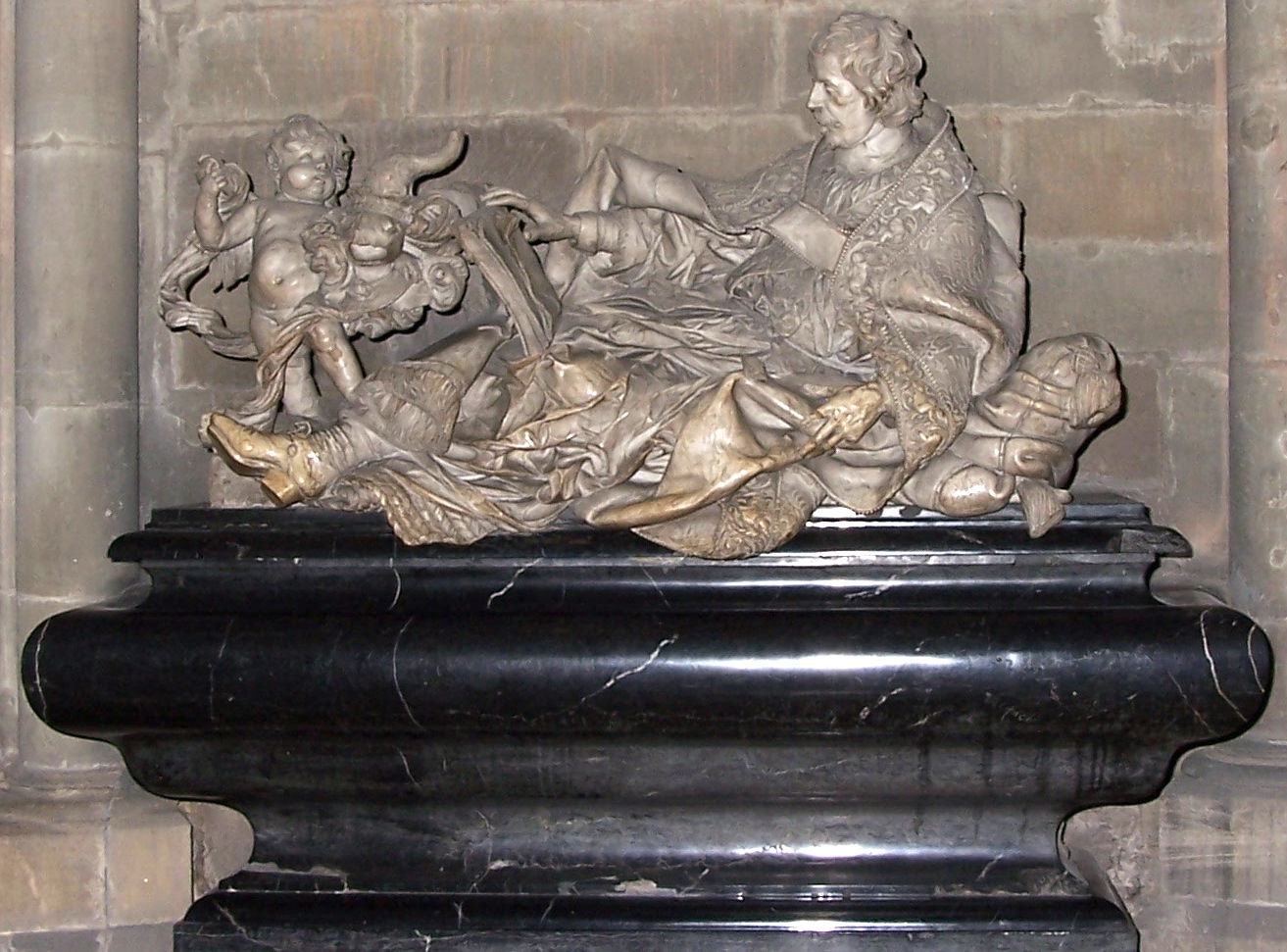
Tombstone of Karl von Metternich by Matthias Rauchmiller

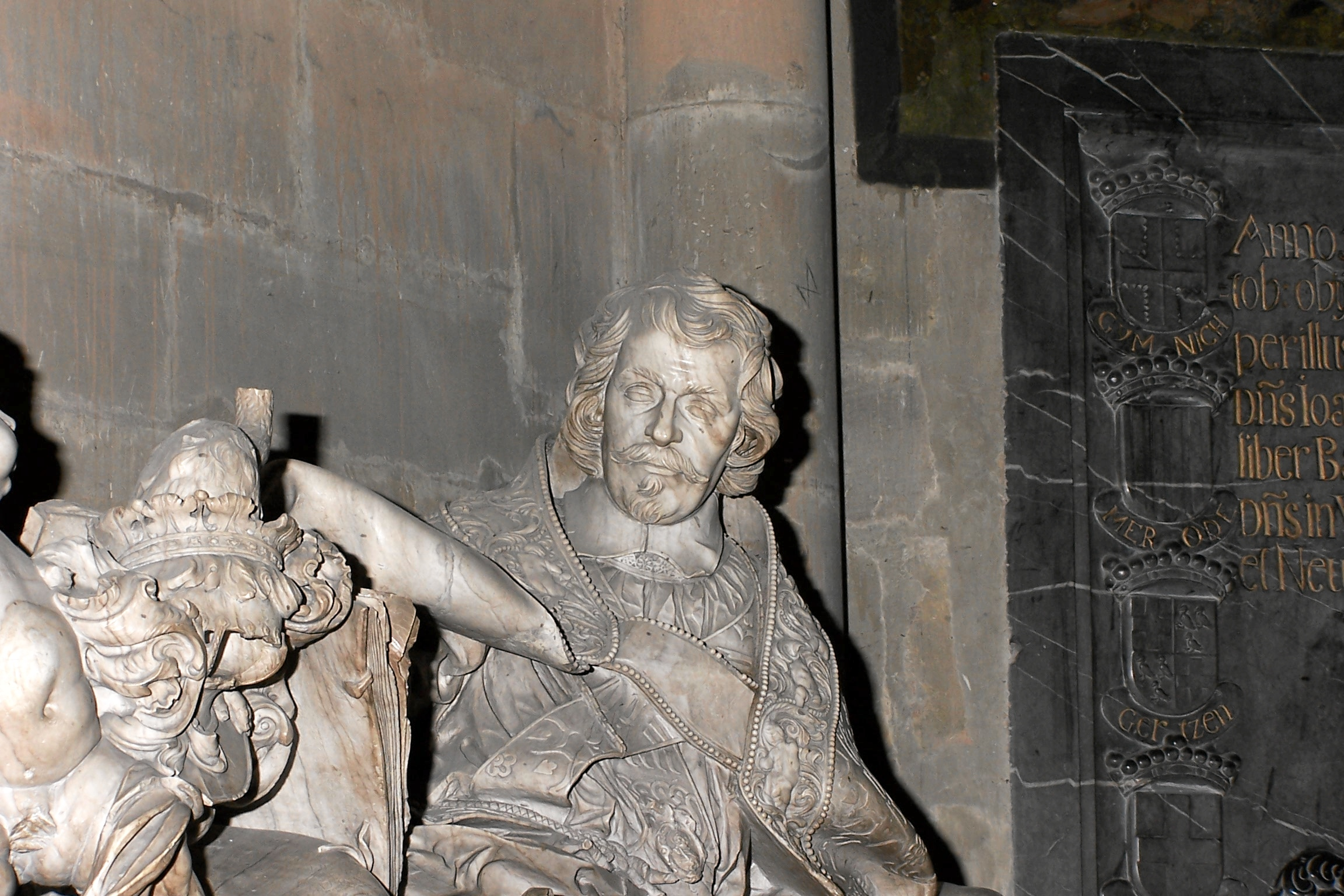
Tombstone of Karl von Metternich (Detail)

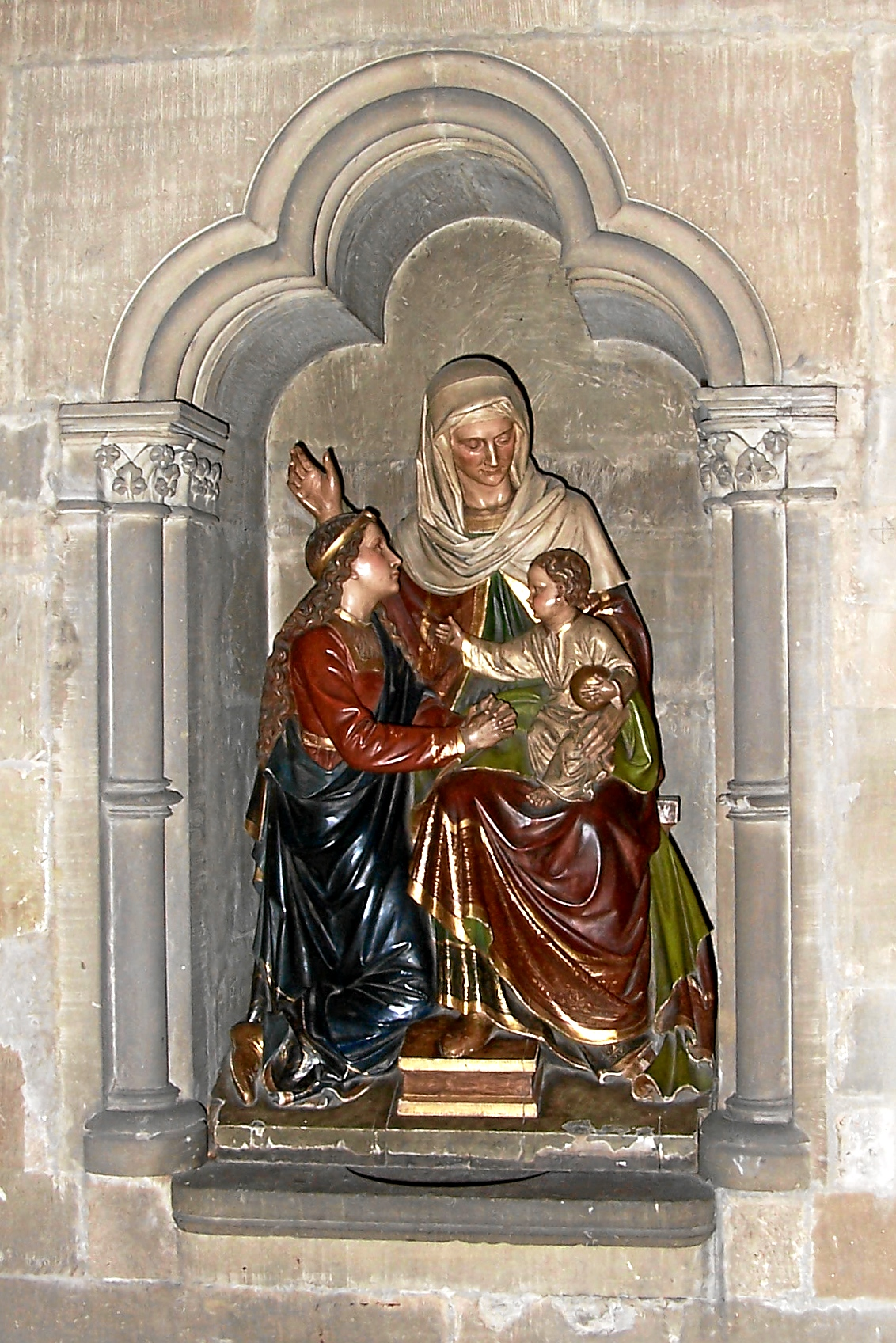
Representation of Mary inside the basilica

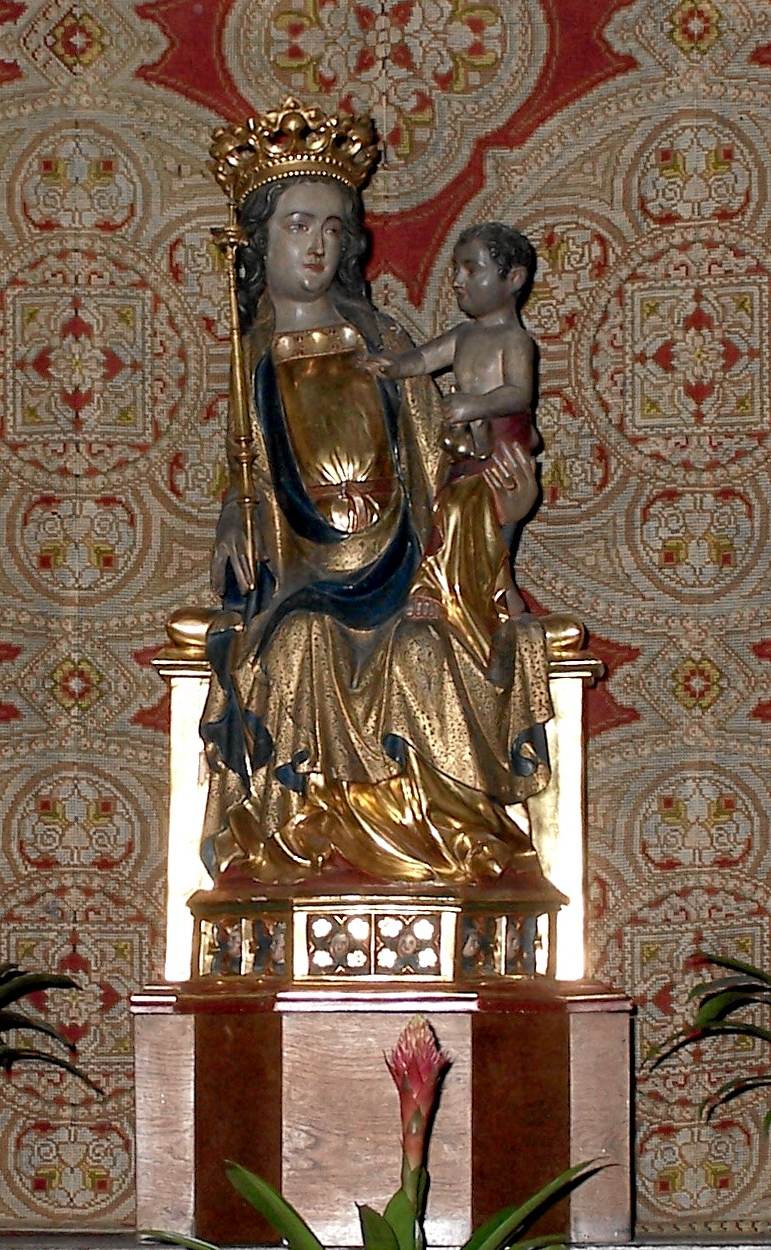
Madonne enthroned

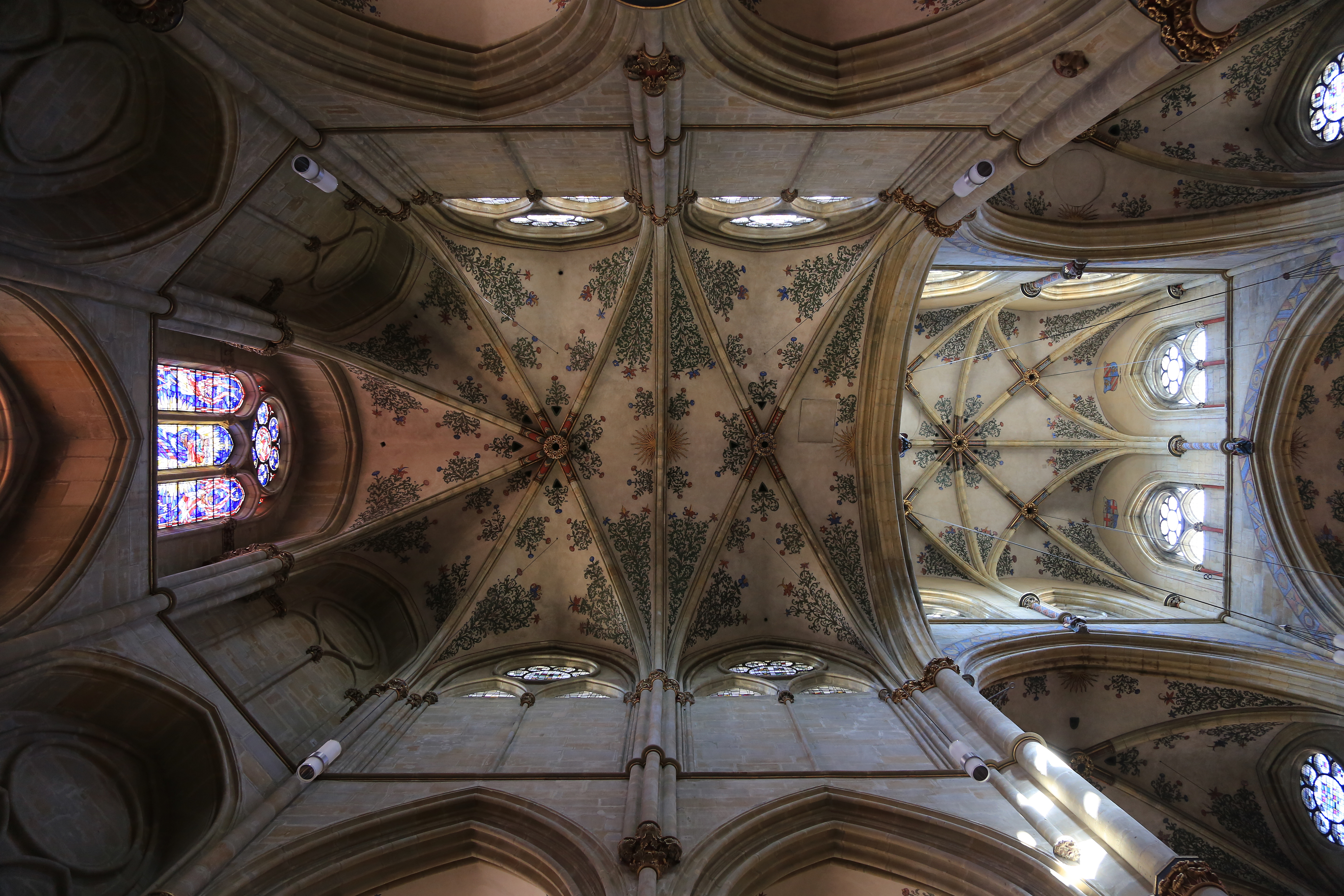
Ceiling

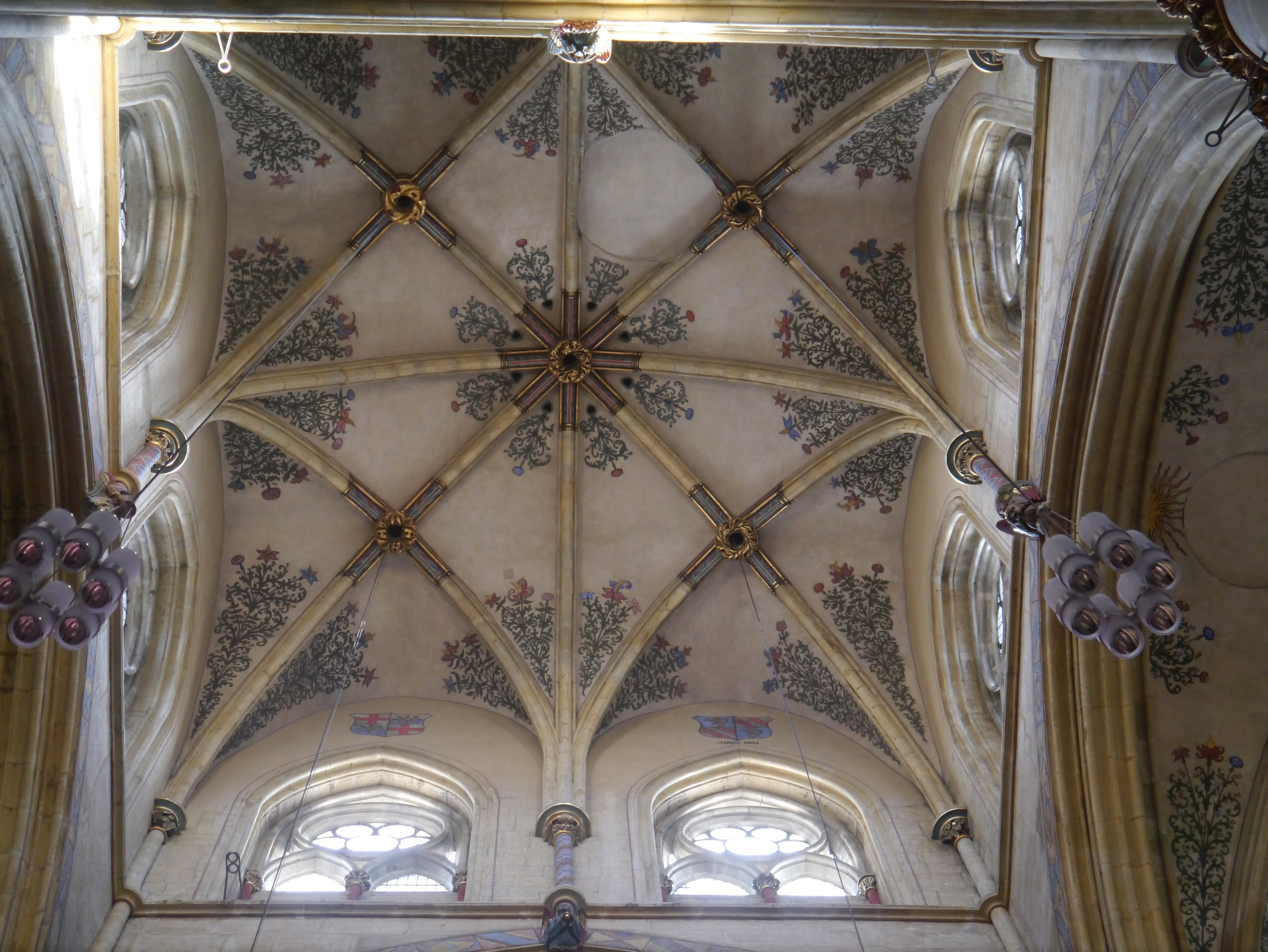
Crossing of nave with transept
