= Christoph Lode =

German novelist

- Born: January 11, 1977 (age 49); Kaiserslautern, Germany
- Other names: Wolf, Daniel (pseudonym)
- Occupation: German author

Christoph Lode (born January 11, 1977, in Kaiserslautern) is a German novelist. He also publishes under the pseudonym Daniel Wolf.

== Biography ==
From 1997 to 2001 he studied social pedagogy in Ludwigshafen am Rhein and worked at the North Baden Psychiatric Center in Wiesloch. Since 2009 he has devoted himself completely to writing. He lives with his wife in Speyer.

== Bibliography ==
- Der Gesandte des Papstes (“The Envoy of the Pope”). Page & Turner, Munich 2008, ISBN 978-3-442-20326-0
- Das Vermächtnis der Seherin (“The Legacy of the Prophetess”). Page & Turner, Munich 2008, ISBN 978-3-442-20327-7
- Pandaemonia: Der letzte Traumwanderer (Pandæmonia: The Last Dream-Wanderer”). Goldmann, Munich 2010, ISBN 978-3-442-47173-7
- Pandaemonia: Die Stadt der Seelen (“Pandæmonia: The City of Souls”). Goldmann, Munich 2011, ISBN 978-3-442-47174-4
- Die Bruderschaft des Schwertes (“The Brotherhood of the Sword”). Goldmann, Munich 2011, ISBN 978-3-442-47376-2
- Pandaemonia: Phoenixfeuer (“Pandæmonia: Phœnix Fire”). Goldmann, Munich 2011, ISBN 978-3-442-47175-1
- (as Daniel Wolf) Das Salz der Erde (“The Salt of the Earth”). Goldmann, Munich 2013, ISBN 978-3-442-47947-4
- (as Daniel Wolf) Das Licht der Welt (“The Light of the World”). Goldmann, Munich 2014, ISBN 978-3-442-48050-0
- (as Daniel Wolf) Der Vasall des Königs ("The Vassal of the King"). Goldmann, Munich 2015, ISBN 978-3-641-18079-9
- (as Daniel Wolf) Das Gold des Meeres ("The Gold of the Sea"). Goldmann, Munich 2016, ISBN 978-3-442-48318-1
- (as Daniel Wolf) Die Gabe des Himmels ("The Gift of Heaven"). Goldmann, Munich 2018, ISBN 978-3-442-48319-8
