= Brixey-aux-Chanoines =

- Commune
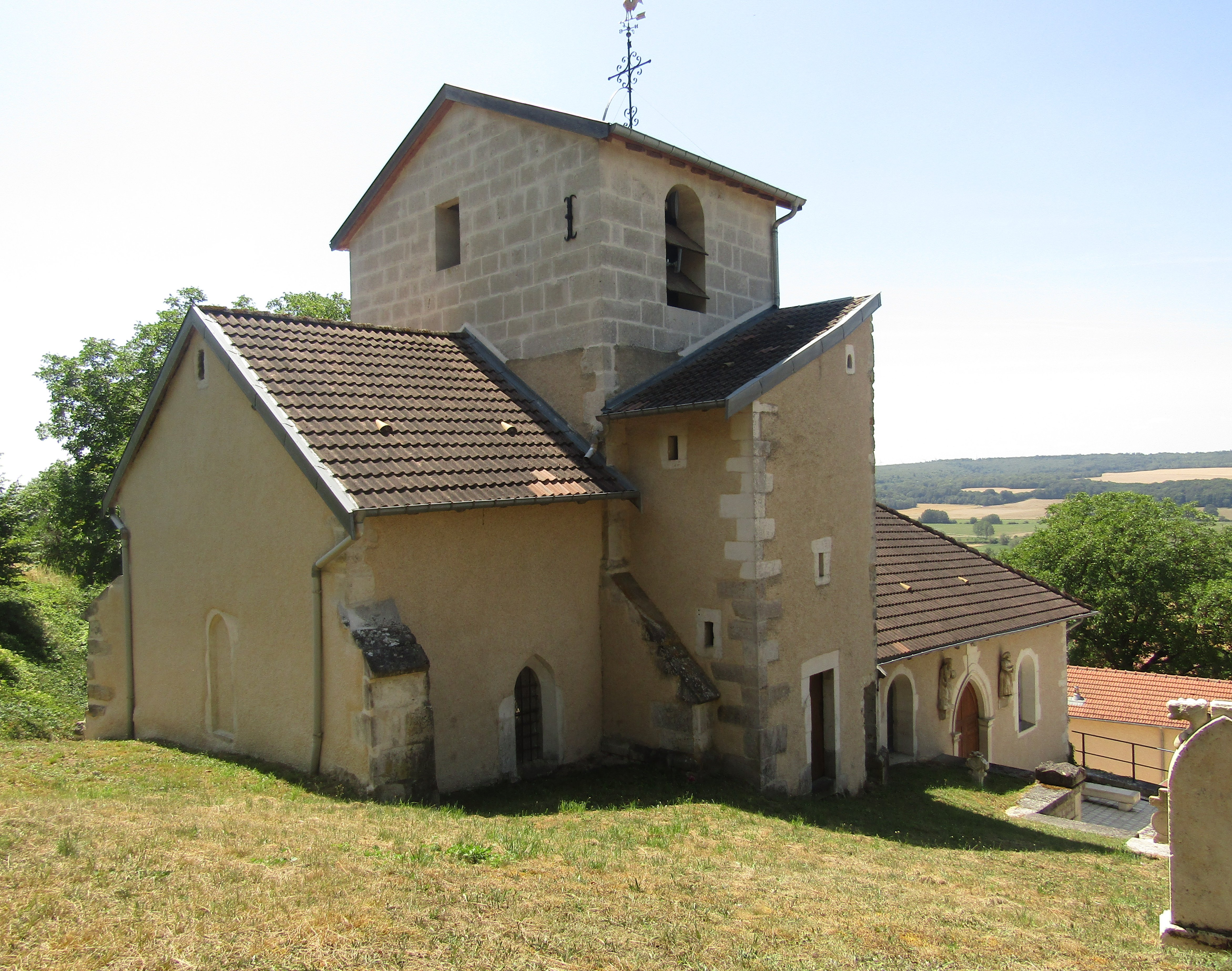
- The church in Brixey-aux-Chanoines

- Coat of arms
- Location of Brixey-aux-Chanoines
- Location within France Location within Grand Est
- Coordinates: 48°28′28″N 5°42′54″E
- Country: France
- Region: Grand Est
- Department: Meuse
- Arrondissement: Commercy
- Canton: Vaucouleurs

Government
  - Mayor (2020–2026): Jean-Marie Trambloy
- Area^{1}: 7.62 km^{2} (2.94 sq mi)
- Elevation: 370 m (1,210 ft)
- Highest elevation: 412 m (1,352 ft)
- Lowest elevation: 263 m (863 ft)
- Population (2023): 77
  - Density: 10/km^{2} (26/sq mi)
- Time zone: UTC+01:00 (CET)
  - Summer (DST): UTC+02:00 (CEST)
- INSEE/Postal code: 55080 /55140
- ^{1} French Land Register data, which excludes lakes, ponds, glaciers > 1 km^{2} (0.386 sq mi or 247 acres) and river estuaries.

Brixey-aux-Chanoines (French pronunciation: [bʁiksɛ o ʃanwan]) is a commune in the Meuse department in Grand Est in northeastern France.

== Population ==
Historical population
Year	Pop.	±% p.a.
1968	123	—
1975	98	−3.19%
1982	84	−2.18%
1990	91	+1.01%
1999	87	−0.50%
2007	82	−0.74%
2012	81	−0.25%
2017	84	+0.73%
2023	77	−1.44%
Source: INSEE

== See also ==
- Communes of the Meuse department
