= John I (archbishop of Trier) =

German archbishop

John I of Speyer
- Archbishop of Trier
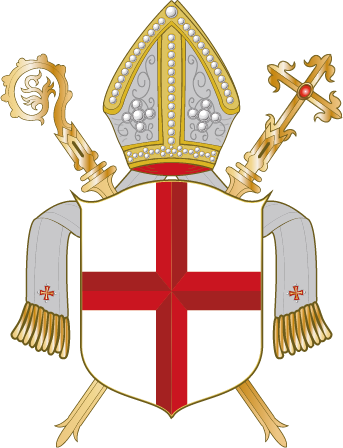
- Arms of the elector of Trier
- Elected: September 1189
- Term ended: 15 July 1212
- Predecessor: Folmar of Karden (Rudolf of Wied)
- Successor: Theodoric II

Personal details
- Born: ca. 1140
- Died: 15 July 1212 Trier
- Denomination: Roman Catholic

John I (German: Johann I.) (born ca. 1140; died 15 July 1212 in Trier) was Archbishop of Trier from 1190 to 1212 and the first to bear the Elector title.

== Biography ==
Originating in the area around Speyer of unknown, possibly non-noble, stock, John was consecrated in 1173 as an archdeacon and as the provost of the Monastery of St. Germain in Speyer. From 1186 to 1189, he was the chancellor of Henry of Hohenstaufen, King of the Romans and imperial regent while Henry's father, the Emperor Frederick Barbarossa, was on crusade. On Henry's initiative, John was elected as archbishop of Trier in September 1189, replacing the see’s rival archbishops, the exiled (and soon to be deceased) Folmar of Karden and the imperial anti-archbishop Rudolf of Wied. He was formally confirmed the following year by Pope Clement III.

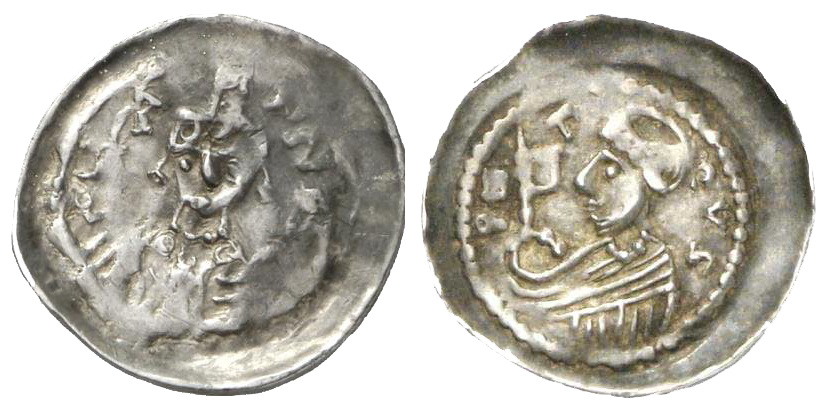
Silver denier of John I, Archbishop of Trier. Obverse shows the mitered archbishop with a crosier and a book, with the motto IOHANN.; the reverse shows the profile of Saint Peter, the patron saint of the cathedral, with the motto PETRVS.

Among his first duties as archbishop were the reorganization and strengthening of the archdiocese (in both its ecclesiastical and its secular aspects), the fortification of the city of Trier, and the acquisition of a number of castles. John established the "Liber annalium jurium," a comprehensive reckoning of all the properties and privileges of the archbishopric (similar to the English Domesday Book of William the Conqueror) and one of the most important historical sources for the city and territory of Trier.

In early 1196 Archbishop John had the legendary "Holy Robe" of Christ displayed again in the west choir of the Cathedral of Trier. This particular occasion not only allowed him to consecrate the new east choir of the restored cathedral on May 1 of that year, but also for him to translate the re-discovered Tunica of Christ – the "seamless garment" – to a newly built and consecrated shrine, paving the way for future public celebrations of the famous relic. Also at his behest the restoration of the Church of Our Lady at Andernach and the Basilica of St. Castor at Koblenz were undertaken.

In 1198, the archbishop attained the release of both the archbishopric and the city of Trier from the suzerainty of the Count Palatine of the Rhine. In 1203, having been threatened with excommunication by Pope Innocent III due to his fluctuating support of the rival imperial candidates, the Staufen Philip, Duke of Swabia and the papal favorite, the Welfic Otto of Brunswick, John undertook a journey to Rome and was formally rehabilitated. He made a second journey to Rome in 1209, accompanying Otto, then King of the Romans, to his coronation as Holy Roman Emperor.

John I died in Trier in 1212 and was buried in Himmerod Abbey in the Eifel.

== See also ==
- Catholic Church in Germany

== Bibliography ==
- Bernhard Endrulat (1881). "Johann I., Erzbischof von Trier" . Allgemeine Deutsche Biographie (in German). Vol. 14. Leipzig: Duncker & Humblot. pp. 420–421.
- Margret Corsten (1974). "Johann I., Erzbischof von Trier". Neue Deutsche Biographie (in German). Vol. 10. Berlin: Duncker & Humblot. pp. 539–539. (full text online).
- Martin Persch (1992). "Johann, Erzbischof von Trier". In Bautz, Friedrich Wilhelm (ed.). Biographisch-Bibliographisches Kirchenlexikon (BBKL) (in German). Vol. 3. Herzberg: Bautz. cols. 181–183. ISBN 3-88309-035-2.

Catholic Church titles
Preceded by Folmar of Karden	Archbishop of Trier; 1189–1212	Succeeded by Theodoric II
