= Rudolf of Wied =

Anti-Archbishop of Trier

Rudolf of Wied (died 9 July 1197) (also appearing in the forms "Rudolph," "Rodolf," Radulf," etc.) was anti-Archbishop of Trier from 1183–1189. He was a supporter of the Holy Roman Emperor Frederick I Barbarossa in the late twelfth century phase of the Investiture Controversy.

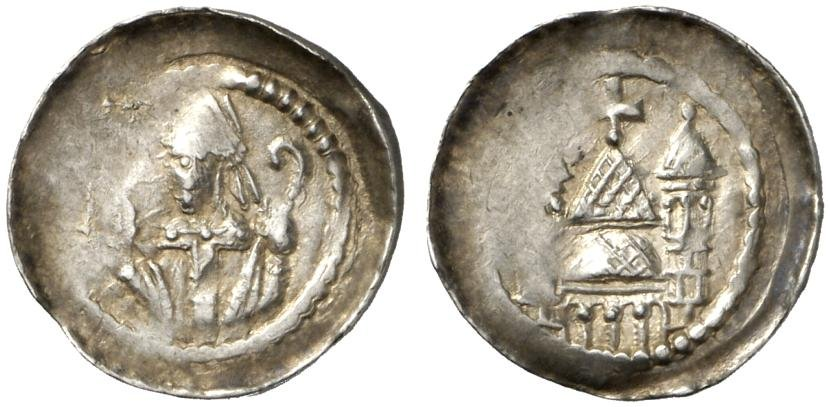
Silver denier of the Archbishop of Trier, issued ca. 1186-1189 by the cathedral chapter. Obverse shows the mitered archbishop with a crosier; reverse shows two towers and a roofed apse surmounted by a cross, probably representing the cathedral. (This coin is identified as representing either Rudolf of Wied or Folmar of Karden, more likely the former.)

== Early career ==
Rudolf was born the second son of Count Siegfried of Wied and the brother of the later Count Theodoric of Wied. He took holy orders and was received as a canon in the cathedral chapter of Trier. He is mentioned as such in the year 1152; the following year he became the cathedral dean, an archdeacon in 1154, and cathedral provost in 1167. He is described as being “peaceable and mild by nature,” and as a “noble and magnificent man.”

== Election ==
When Archbishop Arnold I of Trier died on May 25, 1183, the canons and prelates of Trier came together on the night before the funeral for a meeting in regards to the election of a successor; while the pro-imperial majority agreed on the provost Rudolf, a pro-Papal minority spoke out for the Archdeacon Folmar of Karden. This minority party held an election before the hour previously scheduled for the vote, and chose their own candidate Folmar for the archiepiscopal office. Both parties immediately appealed by to the Emperor (then at Konstanz), to whom the right to make the final decision in the case of disputed episcopal elections had been conceded by the Concordat of Worms in 1122; he ordered that a new election should take place in his presence. Folmar with his followers refused to accept his decision and fled, whereupon Rudolf was elected Archbishop and received investiture from the Emperor.

== Dispute ==
On Rudolf's return to Trier, he found the cathedral occupied by Folmar's supporters, and was forced to take up residence at the Collegiate Church of St. Simeon, also managing to retain a part of the city and the archdiocese. On Whitsunday (May 20) 1184, the “archbishop elect” Rudolf was present when the Emperor held court at Mainz for the knighting of his son, Henry. Thereafter Rudolf followed the Emperor to Italy. In Verona the Barbarossa met Pope Lucius III in autumn of 1184, in order to settle their differences in regard to the archiepiscopal election in Trier personally; however, nothing was achieved. Pope Lucius doubtless was offended that Frederick's son, the young Henry, King of the Romans, had entered the archbishopric of Trier with an armed force in order to acquire it for Rudolf by force. In Koblenz he persecuted those canons of Trier who were adherents of Folmar's, seizing their incomes and ordering their houses and property destroyed. He similarly entered Trier and destroyed Folmar's own residence. Armed clashes between Rudolf's and Folmar's adherents became common, and it was said that the violence in the diocese was a fulfilment of the baleful prophecies of Hildegard of Bingen.

Negotiations between the two factions within the Roman Curia dragged on until May 17, 1186, when Pope Urban III formally consecrated Folmar as Archbishop. Rudolf meanwhile remained a while in Italy: on June 8, 1186 he was at the Emperor's side at Castel-Leone between Crema and Cremona. Then, when Barbarossa returned to Germany in October 1186, the "archbishop elect" attended his court at Kaiserslautern.

== Deposition, later life, and death ==
Thereafter, Clement III ascended the papal throne and determined to put an end to the schism in Trier; when Folmar did not appear when summoned, Clement deprived him on February 12, 1189 of all archiepiscopal rights and privileges, and on June 26, 1189 released all the clergy and the people of the Archdiocese of Trier from obedience to either Folmar or Rudolf. Thus a new election was held, by means of which John of Speyer, the chancellor of the King of the Romans, was raised to the Archiepiscopal throne.

Rudolf retained the dignities of cathedral provost and archdeacon (in which capacities he appears in two notices, one falling sometime between 1190 and 1195 and the other on April 15, 1197). He died on the 9th of July, 1197. When Theoderich von Wied (son of the count of the same name) became Provost of the Church in Rees, he endowed a yearly memorial for his uncle Rudolf.

== Footnotes ==
Catholic Church titles
Preceded by Arnold I of Vaucourt	Archbishop of Trier; 1183-1189	Succeeded by John I
