= External cardinal =

Cardinal who is not a member of the Roman Curia

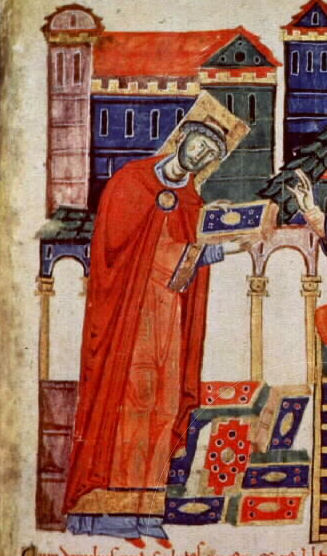
Pope Victor III (1087), before his election to the papacy, was simultaneously the cardinal and abbot of Monte Cassino.

In the category of the members of the College of Cardinals in the central Middle Ages (11th to 13th century), an external cardinal (as opposed to a "curial cardinal") was a cardinal of the Holy Roman Church who was not a member of the Roman Curia, being either the bishop of a non-suburbicarian diocese or the abbot of an abbey not in Rome. In the wider sense, it may also concern cardinals who were appointed to the external episcopal sees and resigned their memberships in the College of Cardinals with this appointment. The term can be used also of cardinals who were generally curial cardinals, but for some time exercised the posts of administrators or prelates of the external churches.

Today, the great majority of the cardinals are archbishops of the main metropolitan dioceses of the world and reside in their countries. Apart from the exclusive right of the election of the new pope, their dignity is purely honorific. However, originally the College of Cardinals was simply a college of the clergy of the City of Rome, constituted of the bishops of the seven dioceses (called suburbicarian sees) bordering the diocese of Rome (cardinal-bishops), priests of the parochial churches of Rome (cardinal-priests) and deacons heading the ecclesiastical regions of the city of Rome (cardinal-deacons). Unlike today, the cardinals had real jurisdiction over the dioceses, parochial churches (called tituli) or deaconries to which they were attached. The phenomenon of the external cardinalate in the late Middle Ages constituted the first exception to the rule, that cardinals – members of the clergy of the diocese of Rome – cannot serve simultaneously in another, external church, which is now common practice.

== History ==
=== Origins and development ===
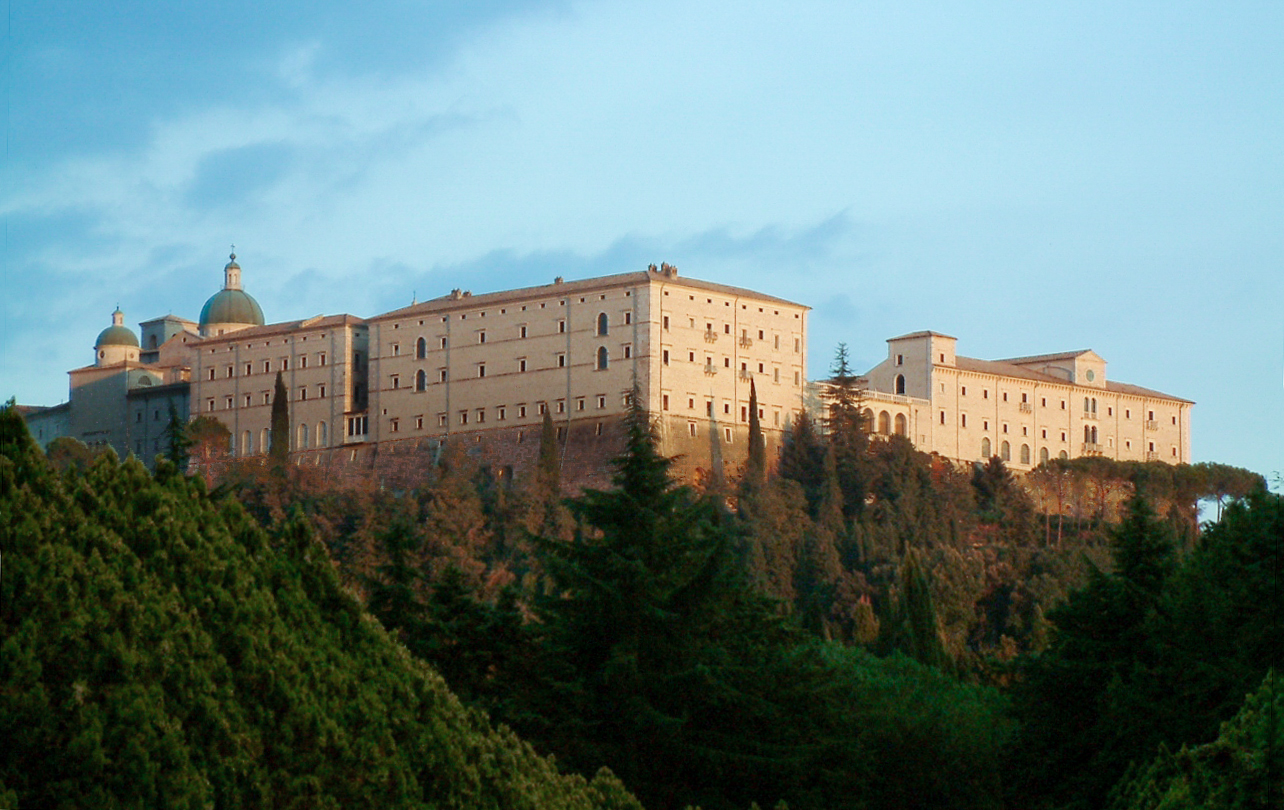
At least eight abbots of Monte Cassino between 1057 and 1259/62 were simultaneously cardinals of the Holy Roman Church.

The College of Cardinals originated from the college of the main clergy of the city of Rome. The title of cardinal initially concerned only the priests of the 28 parochial churches of the Eternal City (tituli), who were required to assist the pope in the liturgical service in the four Basilicas of Rome (Vatican Basilica, Liberian Basilica, Basilica of St. Paul Outside the Walls and San Lorenzo fuori le Mura). Later (probably in the 8th century) the term was extended to the bishops of the seven dioceses bordering the diocese of Rome: Ostia, Porto, Albano, Palestrina, Silva Candida (1079 replaced by Segni), Gabii-Lavicum (whose name later changed to Tusculum, and later to Frascati) and Velletri (after 1060 replaced by Sabina). These bishops (cardinal-bishops) performed the liturgical service in the Lateran Basilica. Finally, the deacons serving in the papal household or heading the ecclesiastical regions of the city (and later attached to the churches called deaconries), also became the cardinals (cardinal-deacons).

The cardinals of the Holy Roman Church up to the 11th century had strictly liturgical duties and generally took no part in the government of the Church. Cardinal bishops were equal to the other bishops, even if celebrating the rite of consecration of the new pope gave them considerable prestige, while the dignity of the cardinal priest or deacon was considered lower than that of a bishop. The liturgical service in the five patriarchal basilicas of Rome, as well as day pastoral duties in constant presence of the cardinals at Rome.

This situation started to gradually change with the ascension of Pope Leo IX (1049–1054) and the beginning of the Reform Papacy. This pope, in order to reform the corrupted Roman clergy, appointed several new cardinals from the monastic centers outside Rome, such as Monte Cassino, Remiremont and Cluny. These new cardinals became his close advisors. Leo's successors continued this trend and Nicholas II in 1059 gave the cardinals the exclusive right to elect a new pope. At the end of the 11th century they formed a single College of Cardinals, which became the main body of the papal government — they served as experts or judges in the legal causes (auditors), countersigned the solemn papal privileges, acted as governors of the cities or provinces of the Papal States or were sent by the popes on important diplomatic missions. The cardinals became the most important members of the Roman Curia, and as such were still required to reside in the papal court, unless they were dispatched for a legatine mission in the name of the pope.

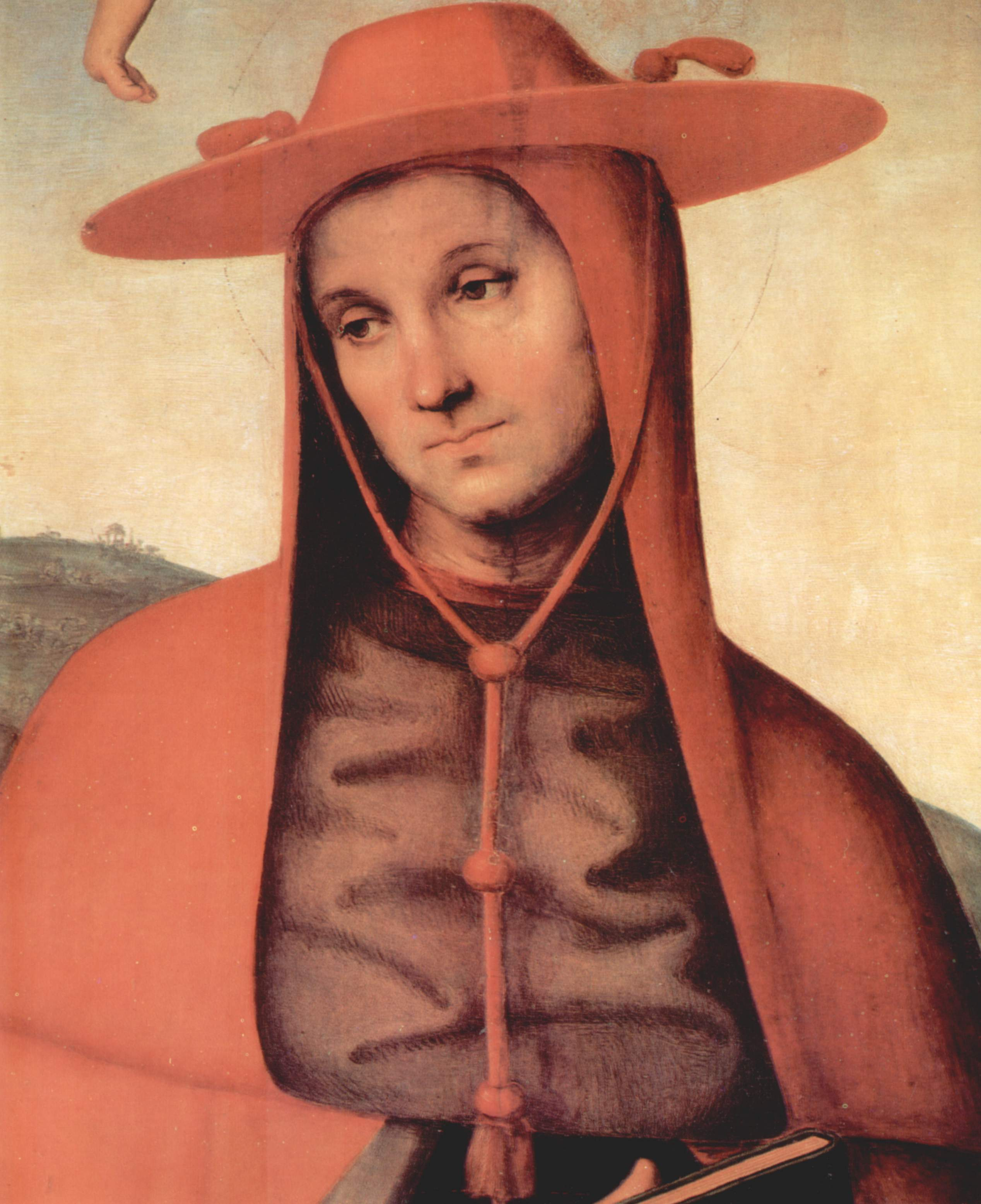
Bernardo degli Uberti was simultaneously a cardinal and abbot of Vallombrosa. In 1106, he became bishop of Parma and resigned his cardinalate with this appointment.

Almost simultaneously to the development of the College of Cardinals as a body of papal advisors, the popes started to elevate to the cardinalate some "external" abbots. After such appointments, they continued to reside in their abbeys and did not become members of the Papal curia. On the other hands, the elections of the cardinals to the posts of abbots of external monasteries were also ratified by the popes. The main goal of such appointments was probably to strengthen the ties between some important monastic centers with the Roman Church. The first known instances of such appointments concerned the abbey of Montecassino, one of the main centers supporting reform of the Church. In 1057 cardinal-deacon Frederick de Lorraine (the future pope Stephen X) was elected abbot of Montecassino; Pope Victor II confirmed his election and simultaneously named him cardinal-priest of S. Crisogono. His successor as abbot of Montecassino, Desiderio, was also quickly promoted to the cardinalate, but continued to act also as abbot. From 1057 until 1259/62 at least eight abbots of Montecassino were simultaneously members of the College of Cardinals. Also some other Italian (e.g. Subiaco, Farfa, Vallombrosa, S. Sophia in Benevento) and French abbeys (St Victor at Marseille) were for some time ruled by the cardinal-abbots.

During the Investiture Controversy, both the legitimate Popes as well as Antipope Clement III developed another, not entirely new, practice. They appointed their cardinals to the important Episcopal sees in Italy in order to assure their government by their own trusted collaborators. Antipope Clement III named cardinals Hugo Candidus and Roberto of S. Marco bishops of Fermo and Faenza respectively. Popes Victor III and Urban II appointed their cardinals to the episcopal sees of Brescia (Herimanus) and Reggio-Emilia (Bonussenior). The practice was continued by successive popes, who named their cardinals particularly to the recently reestablished Latin archiepiscopal sees in southern Italy (Siponto, Brindisi, Salerno, Benevento). Also, three successive archbishops of Pisa: Uberto Rossi Lanfranchi (1133–1137/38), Balduino (1138–1145) and Villano Caetani (1146–1175) were initially the cardinals.

Coat of arms of Guillaume aux Blanches Mains, archbishop of Reims and cardinal-priest of S. Sabina

Up to the pontificate of Pope Alexander III (1159–1181), all the cardinals who were appointed to the external episcopal sees, resigned their membership in the College of Cardinals after receiving episcopal consecration, which clearly shows that the episcopate was considered a higher dignity than that of cardinal-priest or deacon. On the other hand, the bishops were never appointed cardinals. Certainly, the episcopate and cardinalate were considered incompatible dignities. However, during Alexander's pontificate a change is apparent; although there were still the cases of the cardinals leaving the College of Cardinals after assuming episcopal office (Lombardo of Benevento, Rainaldo of Gaeta), there also appeared members of the College who were simultaneously cardinals and bishops. Perhaps Alexander III followed here an example of his rival, Antipope Victor IV, who in 1162 appointed Aicardo Cornazzano bishop of Parma and cardinal-priest. The first such instance in the legitimate obedience was Conrad of Wittelsbach, who was appointed cardinal-priest of S. Marcello in December 1165 and subsequently promoted to the suburbicarian see of Sabina, but continued to act also as archbishop of Mainz. Archbishop of Reims Guillaume aux Blanches Mains was named cardinal priest of S. Sabina in 1179, but retained archdiocese of Reims; similarly bishops Giovanni of Toscanella, Ruffino of Rimini and Gerardo of Novara, elevated to the cardinalate in 1189, 1190 and 1211 respectively. On the other hand, when cardinal-priest Uberto Crivelli was elected and consecrated archbishop of Milan in 1185, he retained his cardinalate and his Roman titulus (S. Lorenzo in Damaso). The posts of cardinal and bishop were no longer considered incompatible with each other. Moreover, the rank of cardinal-priest or cardinal-deacon became equal to that of bishop. However, it seems that the elected, but not yet consecrated, bishops who were appointed cardinals were generally obliged to resign their sees.

Further development occurred in the pontificate of Clement III (1187–1191). Cardinals elected to the external sees renounced their titular churches but without resigning their membership in the College of Cardinals. They used the title cardinalis Sanctae Romanae Ecclesiae in addition to the episcopal title, without indicating their cardinalitial order or titular church. The first such case was that of Adelardo Cattaneo, cardinal-priest of S. Marcello from 1185 and bishop of Verona 1188–1214. That he resigned the church of San Marcello appears not only from his titulature in the documents, but also from the fact that during his lifetime a new cardinal-priest of this title (Fidanzio) was appointed. The case of Adelardo was followed by the cardinal-archbishops Guy Paré of Reims (1204), Uberto Pirovano of Milan (1207) and Stephen Langton of Canterbury (1207) under Pope Innocent III. At the end of 12th century ca. 15% of the members of the College of Cardinals were "external" cardinals.

=== End of the medieval "external" cardinalate ===
Despite the cases mentioned above, the pontificate of Innocent III marks also the beginning of the end of the "external" cardinalate. Stephen Langton was the last cardinal allowed by the Pope to become a diocesan bishop of the external see. From that time the popes constantly rejected all such postulations made by the cathedral chapters, indicating that the presence of the cardinals in the papal curia is indispensable. On the other hand, bishops appointed to the College of Cardinals were obliged to resign their sees (although it must be remarked that until the end of the 13th century they were appointed always to the rank of cardinal-bishop). It is still possible to find a few cases of the cardinals who exercised the posts of administrators of the episcopal sees, but only for a short time, often as part of their legatine duties. The last instance of external cardinal sensu stricto was abbot Riccardo of Montecassino (1252–1259/62). Generally already in the pontificate of Gregory IX (1227–1241), the College of Cardinals became an exclusively curial body, without any "external" element, and remained such until the Great Western Schism (1378–1417). However, during this time the rank of cardinal became also the highest in the Catholic Church, inferior only to the Pope.

The phenomenon of the "external" cardinalate was revived during the Great Western Schism, but in another form and for other reasons. Popes from the rival obediences gave the cardinalitial dignities to the churchmen serving European monarchs (Crown-cardinals) without calling them to the Roman Curia, in order to assure the support of the monarchs. These cardinals continued to reside in their countries. Additionally, the curial cardinals in 13th century started to cumulate a great number of the benefices, from the time of the Schism including also the episcopal sees. After the Council of Trent (1545–1563), the cardinals occupying external bishoprics were generally obliged to reside in them. Today, the majority of the cardinals are simultaneously diocesan archbishops or bishops, and they have no real jurisdiction over their titular churches at Rome.

== Titulature and engagement in the papal government ==
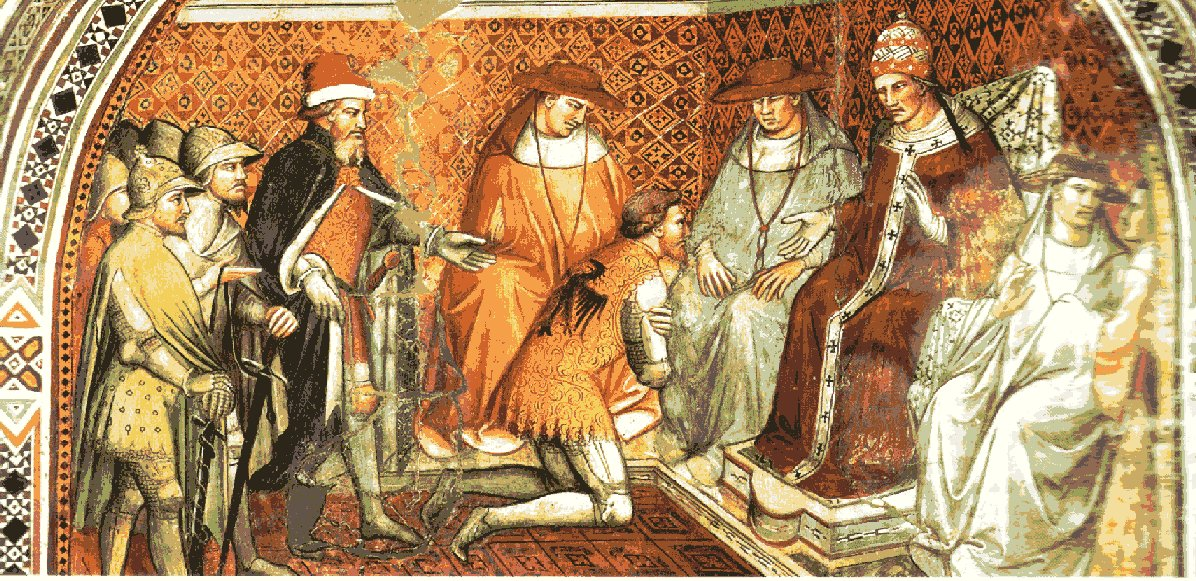
Pope Alexander III (pictured highest at right) was the first pope who allowed the cardinals to occupy the external episcopal sees.

There was no consistency to the titulature used by the "external" cardinals in the official documents issued by the popes, secular rulers or by themselves. Cardinal-abbots subscribed or were called sometimes only as cardinals, sometimes only as abbots, and sometimes using both titles. Abbot Mainardo of Pomposa subscribed papal bulls only as cardinal-bishop of Silva Candida. Desiderius of Montecassino subscribed papal bulls as abbot and cardinal or only as cardinal, while the papal privileges for the abbey Montecassino call him either cardinal and abbot or only abbot. Abbot Richard of St.-Victor used the forms “cardinal and abbot” or only abbot. Leonato of S. Clemente in Casauria in the private documents subscribed as cardinal and abbot but the papal privileges issued for him call him only abbot without indicating his cardinalate.

Cardinals who simultaneously were also bishops usually appear in the documents with both titles: cardinalitial and episcopal. The only exceptions are archbishop Uberto Crivelli of Milan, who subscribed papal bulls only as cardinal, and Ruggiero of Benevento, who generally was styled only as archbishop, while his cardinalate was mentioned very infrequently.

Even more differentiated was the engagement of the "external" cardinals in the Church government and the papal policy, even if limited evidence does not fully highlight this question. Certainly some of them spent some time working in the papal curia, which is attested by their subscriptions on the papal bulls. Among the signatories of the papal privileges appear abbots Desiderius of Montecassino, Mainardo of Pomposa, Giovanni of Subiaco, Richard of St.-Victor, Oderisio de Marsi of Montecassino, Bernardo degli Uberti of Vallombrosa, Amico of S. Vincenzo, Adenulf of Farfa, Benedetto of Torre Maggiore and Giovanni of S. Sophia, as well as the bishops Hugo Candidus, Konrad von Wittelsbach, Guillaume of Reims, Uberto Crivelli of Milan, Giovanni of Toscanella and Ruffino of Rimini. The last three seem to have been de facto curial cardinals, having spent at the papal court most of their time. On the other hand, cardinals like Pietro of S. Benedetto in Salerno, Rainaldo of Montecassino, Simone of Subiaco, Leonato of S. Clemente in Casauria, Ruggiero of Benevento, Roffredo of Montecassino or Riccardo of Montecassino seem to have never participated in the curial business. Also cardinals Adelardo Cattaneo of Verona, Guy Paré of Reims, Uberto Pirovano of Milan and Stephen Langton of Canterbury after their episcopal appointments are no longer attested in the papal curia.

Several "external" cardinals acted as papal legates or vicars, often in the region of their episcopal seat or abbey. Among them were:

- Peter Igneus of S. Salvatore – legate in Germany (1079) and France (1080),
- Mainardo of Pomposa – legate before Emperor Henry IV (1065) and in Milan (1067)
- Richard of St.-Victor – legate in Spain for many years
- Konrad von Wittelsbach – legate in Germany from 1177
- Guillaume of Reims – legate in France from 1179
- Ruffino of Rimini – legate in Imola (ca.1191)
- Gerardo de Sessio – legate in Lombardy (1210–11)

Besides, some "external" cardinals participated in the papal elections: Desiderius of Montecassino and Richard of St.-Victor in 1086, Oderisio de Marsi in 1088, Enrico of Mazara and Amico of S. Vincenzo in 1118, Simone Borelli in 1159, Uberto Crivelli in 1185, probably also Konrad von Wittelsbach in 1185, Giovanni of Toscanella in 1191 and 1198, and Ruffino of Rimini in 1191.

Three "external" cardinals became popes: Frederick of Montecassino became Pope Stephen IX in 1057, Desiderius of Montecassino became Pope Victor III in 1086 and Uberto Crivelli of Milan became Pope Urban III in 1185.

== Lists of the "external" cardinals ==
Note: The "external" cardinals have been divided into four subcategories, of whom only the first two concern the "external" cardinals sensu stricto. Some cardinals belonged to more than one subcategory. The disputed cases are listed separately at the end of the each subsection. Cardinals created by antipopes ("pseudocardinals") are also included.

=== Cardinal-abbots ===
The list is arranged chronologically by the date of appointment of the abbot to the cardinalate or of the cardinal to the abbacy.

Name	Cardinalate	"External" Abbacy	Notes
Frederick de Lorraine, O.S.B.	Cardinal-deacon 1051–57, cardinal-priest of S. Crisogono 1057	Abbot of Montecassino 1057	Became Pope Stephen IX (1057–1058)
Peter Damiani, O.S.B.Cam.	Cardinal-bishop of Ostia 1057–1072	Abbot of Fonte Avellana 1043–1072	Future saint
Desiderius, O.S.B.	Cardinal-priest of S. Cecilia 1059–1087	Abbot of Montecassino 1058–1087	Became Pope Victor III (1086–1087); as cardinal, he was frequently noted in the papal curia
Mainardo, O.S.B.	Cardinal-bishop of Silva Candida 1061–1073	Abbot of Pomposa 1063–1073	He resided in the papal curia until 1069
Pietro Atenolfo, O.S.B.	Cardinal-priest created after 1067	Abbot of S. Benedetto in Salerno 1067–after 1069	He was never attested in the papal curia
Peter Igneus, O.S.B.Vall.	Cardinal-bishop of Albano 1072–1089	Abbot of S. Salvatore in Fucecchio until 1081	Future saint; resided in his abbey until 1079
Giovanni, O.S.B.	Cardinal-deacon of S. Maria in Domnica 1073–1121	Abbot of Subiaco 1069–1121	He joined the obedience of Antipope Clement III in 1084 and then became archdeacon of the Holy Roman Church. Later, he made submission to the Pope Paschalis II
Richard de Saint-Victor, O.S.B.	Cardinal-priest 1078–1106	Abbot of St.-Victor at Marseille 1079–1106	He was named archbishop of Narbonne in 1106 and resigned his cardinalate (see table below)
Damianus, O.S.B.Cam.	Cardinal-deacon 1076–ca.1112	Abbot of Fonte Avellana 1078–1080, abbot of Nonantola in 1086-c.1112	Nephew of Cardinal Pietro Damiani
Oderisio de Marsi, O.S.B.	Cardinal-deacon 1059–88, Cardinal-priest (of S. Cecilia?) 1088–1105	Abbot of Montecassino 1087–1105	Future saint
Bernardo degli Uberti, O.S.B.Vall.	Cardinal-priest of S. Crisogono 1098/99–1106	Abbot of Vallombrosa 1098–1106	Future saint (canonized 1665); in 1106 he was appointed bishop of Parma and resigned his cardinalate (see table below)
Bruno of Segni, O.S.B.	Cardinal-bishop of Segni 1079–1123	Abbot of Montecassino 1107–1111	Future saint (canonized 1183)
Giovanni, O.S.B.	Attested as cardinal-priest in March 1110	Abbot of unknown abbey in the archdiocese of Capua in 1110	The identity of this cardinal remains unknown
Amico, O.S.B.	Cardinal-priest of SS. Nereo ed Achilleo 1117–1139	Abbot of S. Vincenzo al Volturno near Capua 1109/17–1139	1130–1138 in the obedience of Antipope Anacletus II
Oderisio de Sangro, O.S.B.	Cardinal-deacon of S. Agata ca.1112–ca.1137	Abbot of Montecassino 1123–1126	Deposed as abbot in 1126. After 1130 he joined the obedience of Antipope Anacletus II
Adenulf, O.S.B.	Cardinal-deacon of S. Maria in Cosmedin 1132–1144	Abbot of Farfa 1125–1144	Expelled from his abbey by the adherents of Antipope Anacletus II in 1130, returned in 1137
Benedetto, O.S.B.	Cardinal-priest of SS. IV Coronati ca.1135/37	Abbot of Terra Maggiore near San Severo ca. 1135/37	Pseudocardinal of Antipope Anacletus II
Rainaldo di Collemezzo, O.S.B.	Cardinal-priest of SS. Marcellino e Pietro 1139/41–1166	Abbot of Montecassino 1137–1166	
Simone Borelli, O.S.B.	Cardinal-deacon of S. Maria in Domnica ca.1157–1183	Abbot of Subiaco 1149–1159 and 1167–1183	In 1159 joined the obedience of Antipope Victor IV for a short time
Giovanni de Struma, O.S.B.Vall.	Cardinal-bishop of Albano 1163–1168	Abbot of Struma near Arezzo 1158–1168	Pseudocardinal created by Antipope Victor IV (1159–1164); Became Antipope Callixtus III (1168–1178)
Giovanni, O.S.B.	Cardinal-priest of S. Sisto 1168–1177	Abbot of S. Sophia in Benevento 1142–1177	
Leonato de Manoppello, O.S.B.	Cardinal-deacon 1170–1182	Abbot of S. Clemente in Casauria 1152/55–1182	
Roffredo dell'Isola, O.S.B.	Cardinal-priest of SS. Marcellino e Pietro 1188–1210	Abbot of Montecassino 1188–1210	
Riccardo, O.S.B.	Cardinal-priest of S. Ciriaco 1252/56–1259/62	Abbot of Montecassino 1252–1259/62	It is not known if he was promoted by Innocent IV (1243–1254) or by Alexander IV (1254–1261). He was deposed in 1259 for having participated in the coronation of Manfred of Sicily (the enemy of the pope Alexander IV), but continued to act as abbot and to style himself as cardinal until his death in 1262. The last instance of "external" cardinal in the Middle Ages

==== Disputed cases ====
Name	Cardinalate	"External" Abbacy	Notes
Oderisius, O.S.B.	Cardinal-deacon 1063–1076	Abbot of S. Giovanni in Venere 1061–1076	According to historian Pietro Pollidoro (18th century) ancient inscription in the monastery of S. Giovanni in Venere calls Abbot Oderisio I "deacon of the Holy Roman Church"; this testimony can not be verified because this inscription has not been preserved to our times
Odericus, O.S.B.	Cardinal-priest of S. Prisca 1066–1082	Abbot of Vendôme 1045–1082	The theory that he was a cardinal of S. Prisca is based on the privilege issued for him by Pope Alexander II in July 1066. However, the true meaning of this privilege is uncertain because in other documents issued after that date he is constantly referred to only as abbot
Oderisio di Palearia, O.S.B.	Cardinal-deacon created by Alexander III	Abbot of S. Giovanni in Venere 1155–1204	The only contemporary source attesting his cardinalate is the necrology of the abbey of Montecassino. In the few official contemporary documents that refer to him (issued 1176, 1195 and 1200) he appears only as abbot. One inscription dated April 1165 calls him "subdeacon of the Holy Roman Church"
Teodino de Scarpa, O.S.B.	Cardinal-priest created by Alexander III	Abbot of Montecassino 1166–1167	No documents issued during his short reign in the abbey of Montecassino have been preserved to our times. Therefore, the testimony of Alphonsus Ciacconius (1540–1599) that he was named cardinal by Alexander III can not be verified.

=== Cardinals – diocesan bishops (11–13th century) ===
The list is arranged chronologically by the date of appointment of the bishop to the cardinalate or of the cardinal to the episcopate.

Name	Cardinalate	"External" episcopate	Notes
Hugo Candidus, O.S.B.Clun.	Cardinal-priest of S. Crisogono 1049–1089, cardinal-bishop of Palestrina 1089–1099	Bishop of Fermo in 1084	Excommunicated by Pope Gregory VII in 1078, joined the obedience of Antipope Clement III in 1080. In 1089 he was transferred to the suburbicarian see of Palestrina
Aicardo Cornazzano	Cardinal-deacon in 1160, cardinal-priest in 1164	Bishop of Parma 1162–1167	Pseudocardinal of Antipope Victor IV. He was also podesta of the city of Parma 1164–67. In 1167 he was expelled from Parma by the adherents of Pope Alexander III
Konrad von Wittelsbach	Cardinal-priest of S. Marcello 1165–1166, cardinal-bishop of Sabina 1166–1200	Archbishop of Mainz 1161–1177 and 1183–1200, archbishop of Salzburg 1177–1183, administrator of Sora 1167–after 1170	He was expelled from his archdiocese in 1165 by the adherents of Antipope Paschalis III. Until 1177 he resided in papal curia or acted as papal legate. The first instance of the legitimate cardinal who was also diocesan bishop
Pietro da Pavia, Can.Reg.	Cardinal-priest of S. Crisogono 1173–1179, cardinal-bishop of Tusculum 1179–1182	Bishop-elect of Meaux 1171–1175, archbishop(-elect?) of Bourges 1180–1182	Pope Alexander III forced him to resign the see of Meaux in 1175. His election to the archbishopric of Bourges remains obscure; he continued to subscribe the documents only as cardinal-bishop of Tusculum until his death, which indicates that he probably did not take possession of this see. As cardinal, he frequently acted as legate in France and in 1175 resided in Meaux for a short time
Guillaume aux Blanches Mains	Cardinal-priest of S. Sabina 1179–1202	Archbishop of Reims 1176–1202	
Ruggiero di San Severino, O.S.B.	Cardinal-priest of S. Eusebio 1178/80–1221	Archbishop of Benevento 1179–1221	It is not possible to establish whether he was created cardinal before, after or simultaneously with his appointment as archbishop.
Uberto Crivelli	Cardinal-priest of S. Lorenzo in Damaso 1182–1185	Bishop-elect of Vercelli 1183–85, archbishop of Milan 1185–1187	De facto curial cardinal. He became Pope Urban III (1185–1187) and as such, he retained the see of Milan until his death
Adelardo Cattaneo	Cardinal-priest of S. Marcello 1185–1188, S.R.E. cardinalis 1188–1214	Bishop of Verona 1188–1214	First cardinal who after appointment as bishop renounced his titulus without renouncing of his cardinalate. In 1193 Pope Celestine III gave his former title of S. Marcello to cardinal Fidanzio
Giovanni	Cardinal-priest of S. Clemente 1189–1199, cardinal-bishop of Albano 1199–1210/11	Bishop of Toscanella 1188–1199 (from 1192 of Viterbo e Toscanella)	De facto curial cardinal; in 1199 he was transferred to the suburbicarian see of Albano
Ruffino	Cardinal-priest of S. Prassede 1190–1191/92	Bishop of Rimini 1185–1191/92	De facto curial cardinal
Soffredo	Cardinal-deacon of S. Maria in Via Lata 1182–1193, cardinal-priest of S. Prassede 1193–1210	Patriarch-elect of Jerusalem in 1203	Pope Innocent III confirmed his election but shortly thereafter the cardinal (legate in Outremer at that time) resigned the see without being consecrated In 1201 he was elected also archbishop of Ravenna but this election was not ratified by the Holy See (see below)
Guy Paré, O.Cist.	Cardinal-bishop of Palestrina 1200–1204, S.R.E. cardinalis 1204–1206	Archbishop of Reims 1204–1206	He resigned his cardinalitial title without resigning the membership in the Sacred College. Shortly before his death Guido Papareschi was appointed new cardinal-bishop of Palestrina
Uberto Pirovano	Cardinal-deacon of S. Angelo 1206–1207, S.R.E. cardinalis 1207–1211	Archbishop of Milan 1206/7–1211	He resigned his cardinalitial deaconry without resigning the membership in the Sacred College.
Stephen Langton	Cardinal-priest of S. Crisogono 1206–1207, S.R.E. cardinalis 1207–1228	Archbishop of Canterbury 1206/7–1228	He resigned his cardinalitial title without resigning the membership in the Sacred College. The last instance of the cardinal being simultaneously diocesan bishop before the Great Western Schism
Gerardo de Sessio, O.Cist.	Elected cardinal-bishop of Albano in 1211	Bishop-elect of Novara 1210–1211, archbishop-elect of Milan 1211	He never received episcopal consecration; during his brief cardinalate he acted as papal legate in Lombardy

==== Disputed case ====
Name	Cardinalate	"External"episcopate	Notes
Anselmo	Named cardinal-priest of SS. Nereo ed Achilleo in January 1201	Archbishop of Naples 1191–1214	The letter of his nomination issued in January 1201 is the only documentary proof of his cardinalate. In all known documents issued after that date he appears only as archbishop. Therefore, it is not certain whether his promotion went into effect
Rolando	Created cardinal deacon of S. Maria in Portico Octaviae in the consistory of March 6, 1185	Elected Bishop of Dol in 1177, by unanimous decision of its cathedral chapter; took possession of the see in 1182	Bishop-elect of Dol from 1177 and cardinal-deacon of S. Maria in Portico 1185–87; certainly he never resided in his diocese and after his promotion to the cardinalate he appears in the documents only as cardinal-deacon, which indicates his resignation, but the exact dates of his death and of the appointment of his successor are not known (cf. Ganzer, p. 137 no. 58; and Gams, p. 547; according to Gams Rolando remained bishop of Dol until his death, but the date of death given by Gams - March 4, 1187, is undoubtedly erroneous because he subscribed several documents after that date, cf. Ganzer, p. 137 no. 58 note 12)

=== Cardinals who renounced their cardinalate after appointments to the external bishoprics ===
The list is arranged chronologically by the date of appointment of the cardinal to the external episcopal see and his renouncement of the cardinalate.

Name	Cardinalate	"External" episcopate	Notes
Johannes	Cardinal-deacon ca. 960/1	Bishop of Narni 961–965	Future Pope John XIII 965–972
Friedrich	Cardinal-priest in 1001	Archbishop of Ravenna 1001–1004	
Airardus, O.S.B.	Cardinal-priest of unknown titulus attached to the Basilica of Saint Paul Outside the Walls 1050	Bishop of Nantes 1050–ca.1054/60	Expelled from his diocese ca. 1054 and died ca. 1060
Roberto	Cardinal-priest of S. Marco in 1086	Bishop of Faenza 1086–1104	Pseudocardinal of Antipope Clement III
Herimannus, O.S.B.	Cardinal-priest of SS. IV Coronati 1080–1098	Bishop of Brescia 1087/98–1115	For eleven years (1087–98) he was simultaneously cardinal and bishop-elect, but after receiving episcopal consecration (1098) resigned his cardinalate. He was deposed as bishop in 1115 and died after 1116. In 1100 Augustinus became new cardinal-priest of SS. IV Coronati
Bonussenior	Cardinal-priest of S. Maria in Trastevere 1082–1098	Bishop of Reggio Emilia 1098–1118	By 1109 Odelricus was a new cardinal-priest of S. Maria in Trastevere
Alberto, O.S.B.	Cardinal-priest of S. Sabina 1091/95–1100	Archbishop of Siponto 1100–1116	By 1112 cardinal Albericus occupied his former titulus S. Sabina
Niccolo (?)	Cardinal-priest ca.1100/01 (?)	Archbishop of Brindisi 1101–1104	This archbishop of Brindisi is referred to as former cardinal only in one document of Pope Paschalis II, which, however, does not mention his name. Therefore, his identity remains uncertain
Bernardo degli Uberti, O.S.B.Vall.	Cardinal-priest of S. Crisogono 1098/99–1106	Bishop of Parma 1106–1133	Future saint; as cardinal, he was also abbot of Vallombrosa 1098–1106 (see table above). In 1109/10 Berardo de Marsi became new cardinal-priest of S. Crisogono
Richard de Saint-Victor, O.S.B.	Cardinal-priest 1078–1106	Archbishop of Narbonne 1106–1121	As cardinal-priest, he was also abbot of St.-Victor at Marseille 1079–1106 (see table above)
Giovanni da Piacenza	Cardinal-priest 1096–1106	Bishop of Gubbio 1106–before 1126	As cardinal he acted for some time (1101–03) as vicar and administrator of the see of Piacenza (see table below)
Landolfo	Cardinal-priest of S. Lorenzo in Lucina 1106–1108	Archbishop of Benevento 1108–1119	In 1116 Gregorio of Siena became new cardinal-priest of S. Lorenzo in Lucina
Berardo de Marsi, O.S.B.	Cardinal-deacon of S. Angelo 1105/07–1109/10, cardinal-priest of S. Crisogono 1109/10	Bishop of Marsi 1110–1130	Future saint In 1111 Gregorio of Lucca was appointed new cardinal-priest of S. Crisogono
Riso	Cardinal-priest of S. Lorenzo in Damaso 1103/05–1112	Archbishop of Bari 1112–1118	In 1116 Deusdedit became new cardinal-priest of S. Lorenzo in Damaso
Romualdo	Cardinal-deacon of S. Maria in Via Lata ca.1110–1121	Archbishop of Salerno 1121–1136	In 1123 Uberto Rossi Lanfranchi replaced him in the deaconry of S. Maria in Via Lata. After 1130 he joined the obedience of Antipope Anacletus II
Baialardus	Cardinal-deacon 1120–1121/22	Archbishop of Brindisi 1121/22–after 1130 (1144?)	Some sources erroneously say that he was named archbishop in 1118
Boso	Cardinal-deacon (before 1110–1113), cardinal-priest of S. Anastasia 1113–1122	Bishop of Turin 1122–after 1125	In 1123 Teobaldo Buccapeccus became new cardinal-priest of S. Anastasia
Uberto Rossi Lanfranchi	Cardinal-deacon of S. Maria in Via Lata 1123–1125/26, cardinal-priest of S. Clemente 1125/26–1133	Archbishop of Pisa 1133–1137/38	For a few months he acted simultaneously as cardinal-priest and archbishop-elect, but after episcopal consecration (September 1133) resigned his cardinalate
Balduino da Pisa, O.Cist.	Cardinal-priest of S. Maria in Trastevere 1137–1138	Archbishop of Pisa 1138–1145/46	In 1140 he was succeeded by Gregorio della Suburra as cardinal-priest of S. Maria in Trastevere
Griffone	Cardinal-priest of S. Pudenziana 1138–1139	Bishop of Ferrara 1139–after 1156	In 1140 Presbitero succeeded him as cardinal-priest of S. Pudenziana
Villano Caetani	Cardinal-priest of S. Stefano in Monte Celio 1144–1146	Archbishop of Pisa 1146–1175	In 1151 Gerardo was named new cardinal-priest of S. Stefano in Monte Celio
Galdino della Sala	Cardinal-priest of S. Sabina 1166–1167	Archbishop of Milan 1166–1176	Despite receiving episcopal consecration on 18 April 1166 he continued to style himself as cardinal until he took possession of the see of Milan in September 1167
Rainaldo, O.S.B.	Cardinal-deacon in 1169	Bishop of Gaeta 1169–1171, archbishop of Bari 1171–1188	He appears as cardinal-deacon and bishop-elect of Gaeta in January 1169, but after receiving Episcopal consecration (before 29 March 1170) resigned his cardinalate
Lombardo da Piacenza	Cardinal-deacon 1170–1171, cardinal-priest of S. Ciriaco 1171	Archbishop of Benevento 1171–1177/79	He resigned as archbishop before March 1179 and died after July 1179. Probably the last instance of the cardinal who resigned his cardinalate after episcopal appointment

==== Disputed cases ====
Name	Cardinalate	"External" episcopate	Notes
Guitmund, O.S.B.	Cardinal-priest created by Gregory VII	Bishop of Aversa 1088–after 1090	There are doubts if he was ever promoted to the cardinalate
Alberico	Cardinal-priest of S. Pietro in Vincoli in 1100	Bishop of Sutri 1105–after 1112	The identity of the cardinal with bishop of Sutri is uncertain.
Siro de Porcello	Cardinal in 1130	Archbishop of Genoa 1130–1163 (until 1133 only bishop)	First archbishop of Genoa (from 1133). His cardinalate is attested only in the chronicle of Jacobus de Voragine, who lived over a hundred years later. However, Jacobus was himself archbishop of Genoa (1292–98), and it is possible that he may have used some documents that are lost today.

=== Cardinals who served as administrators or prelates of the external churches (until 13th century) ===
Name	Cardinalate	"External" post	Notes
Giovanni da Piacenza	Cardinal-priest 1096–1106	Vicar and administrator of the see of Piacenza 1101–1103	He became bishop of Gubbio in 1106 and resigned his cardinalate (see table above)
Enrico	Cardinal-deacon of S. Teodoro in 1117/18	Dean of Mazara del Vallo ca.1117/18	
Azo da Piacenza	Cardinal-deacon 1132–1134, cardinal-priest of S. Anastasia 1134–1139	Provost of the collegiate church of S. Antonino in Piacenza 1119–1139	During his cardinalate he resided in Piacenza in 1133–34 and 1137–38
Ildebrando Grassi, Can.Reg.	Cardinal-deacon of S. Eustachio 1152–1156, cardinal-priest of SS. Apostoli 1156–1178	Administrator of the see of Modena 1154–1156 and 1174–1175	In both cases administration of the see of Modena was only a part of his legatine duties
Rainiero Capocci, O.Cist.	Cardinal-deacon of S. Maria in Cosmedin 1216–1250	Administrator of the see of Viterbo in 1217 and 1243–1244	Administration of the see of Viterbo was only a part of his legatine duties
Stephen Báncsa	Cardinal-bishop of Palestrina 1251–1270	Administrator of the see of Esztergom 1252–1254	He was archbishop of Esztergom 1243–1251/52. After his promotion to the cardinalate Pope Innocent IV initially allowed him to retain the administration of his former see but later forced him to resign it
Giovanni Castrocoeli, O.S.B.	Cardinal-priest of S. Vitale 1294–1295	Administrator of the sees of Benevento and S. Agata de' Goti 1294–1295	He was archbishop of Benevento 1282–1294 and retained the administration of this see after promotion to the cardinalate

== Rejected episcopal elections of the cardinals in 13th century ==
Name	Cardinalate	Episcopal election	Notes
Gerardo	Cardinal-deacon of S. Adriano 1182–1208	Elected bishop of Lucca in 1201	Pope Innocent III refused to confirm the election
Soffredo	Cardinal-deacon of S. Maria in Via Lata 1182–1193, cardinal-priest of S. Prassede 1193–1210	Elected archbishop of Ravenna in 1201	In the letter issued in November/December 1201 Pope Innocent III rejected this election In 1203 he acted for a short time as patriarch-elect of Jerusalem (see table above)
Pelagio Galvani	Cardinal-deacon of S. Lucia in Septisolio 1206/07–1211, cardinal-priest of S. Cecilia 1211–1213, cardinal-bishop of Albano 1213–1230	Elected Patriarch of Antioch in 1217	Pope Honorius III refused to confirm his election and on April 25, 1219 appointed Pietro Capuano (future cardinal) to the vacated patriarchal see
Aldebrandino Gaetano Orsini	Cardinal- deacon of S. Eustachio 1216–1219, cardinal-priest of S. Susanna 1219–1221, cardinal-bishop of Sabina 1221–1223	Elected bishop of Paris in 1219	Honorius III in the letter issued on December 4, 1219 informed the cathedral chapter of Paris that he had refused to confirm this election and that the chapter should elect a new candidate
Konrad von Urach, O.Cist.	Cardinal-bishop of Porto e Santa Rufina 1219—1227	Elected archbishop of Besançon in 1220	Pope Honorius III rejected his election
Tommaso da Capua	Cardinal-deacon of S. Maria in Via Lata 1216, cardinal-priest of S. Sabina 1216—1239	Elected patriarch of Jerusalem in 1227	Pope Gregory IX rejected his election
Jacques de Vitry, Can.Reg.	Cardinal-bishop of Frascati 1229—1240	Elected patriarch of Jerusalem in 1239/40	On May 14, 1240 Pope Gregory IX appointed new patriarch and in the letter of his nomination explained the canons of the chapter of Jerusalem the reasons of his earlier rejection of the election of Cardinal de Vitry, who had died on May 1, 1240
Egidius de Torres	Cardinal-deacon SS. Cosma e Damiano 1216/17—1254	Elected Archbishop of Toledo in 1247	On February 21, 1248 Pope Innocent IV rejected his postulation to that see and appointed Juan de Medina Pomar as new archbishop of Toledo
Pierre de Bar	Cardinal-priest of S. Marcello 1244–1252, cardinal-bishop of Sabina 1251/52—1253	Elected bishop of Noyon in 1249/50	Pope Innocent IV refused to confirm his election indicating that his presence in curia is indispensable

== Bibliography ==
- Brixius, Johannes Matthias (1912). Die Mitglieder des Kardinalkollegiums von 1130–1181 (in German). Berlin: R. Trenkel.
- Eubel, Konrad (1913). Hierarchia Catholica Medii Aevi. Vol. I (in Latin). Stanford University Library. Archived from the original on 2019-07-09.
- Gams, Pius Bonifatius (1931). Series episcoporum Ecclesiae catholicae, quotquot innotuerunt a beato Petro apostolo (in Latin). Wielkopolska Biblioteka Cyfrowa.
- Ganzer, Klaus (1963). Die Entwicklung des auswärtigen Kardinalats im hohen Mittelalter. Ein Beitrag zur Geschichte des Kardinalkollegiums vom 11.bis 13. Jahrhundert. Bibliothek des Deutschen Historischen Instituts in Rom (in German). Tübingen: Max Niemeyer Verlag.
- Hüls, Rudolf (1977). Kardinäle, Klerus und Kirchen Roms: 1049–1130. Bibliothek des Deutschen Historischen Instituts in Rom (in German). Tübingen: Max Niemeyer Verlag. ISBN 978-3-484-80071-7.
- Kartusch, Elfriede (1948). Das Kardinlkollegium in der Zeit von 1181–1227. Ein Beitrag zur Geschichte des Kardinalates im Mittelalter (in German). Wien.
- Kehr, Paul Fridolin (1906–1975). Regesta pontificum Romanorum. Italia Pontificia. Vol. I-X (in Latin). SUL Books in the Public Domain. Archived from the original on 2006-02-23.
- Klewitz, Hans-Walter (1957). Reformpapsttum und Kardinalkolleg. Die Entstehung des Kardinalkollegiums. Studien über die Wiederherstellung der römischen Kirche in Süditalien durch das Reformpapsttum. Das Ende des Reformpapsttums (in German). Darmstadt: Hermann Gentner Verlag.
- Loud, Graham (2007). The Latin Church in Norman Italy. Cambridge University Press. ISBN 978-0-521-25551-6.
- Maleczek, Werner (1984). Papst und Kardinalskolleg von 1191 bis 1216 (in German). Vienna: Verlag der Österreichischen Akademie der Wissenschaften. ISBN 3-7001-0660-2.
- Miranda, Salvador (1998–2009). The Cardinals of the Holy Roman Church. Florida International University. Archived from the original on 2009-07-03.
- Paravicini Bagliani, Agostino (1972). Cardinali di curia e "familiae" cardinalizie dal 1227 al 1254. Italia Sacra. Studi e documenti di storia ecclesiastica (in Italian). Padova: Editrice Antenore.
- Potthast, August (1874). Regesta pontificum Romanorum inde ab a. post Christum natum 1198 ad a. 1304. Vol. I (in Latin). Berlin.
- Robinson, Ian Stuart (1990). The Papacy 1073–1198. Continuity and Innovation. Cambridge Medieval Textbooks. Cambridge University Press. ISBN 0-521-31922-6.
- Sägmüller, Johannes Baptist (1913). "Cardinal (1)" . In Herbermann, Charles (ed.). Catholic Encyclopedia. New York: Robert Appleton Company.
- Schwartz, Gerhard (1913). Die Besetzung der Bistümern Reichsitaliens unter den sächsischen und salischen Kaisern mit den Listen der Bischöfe 951–1122 (in German). Verlag von B. G. Teubner in Leipzig und Berlin.
- Zenker, Barbara (1964). Die Mitglieder des Kardinalkollegiums von 1130 bis 1159 (in German). Würzburg.
