= 1198 papal election =

Election of Catholic Pope Innocent III

Papal election 1198

Dates and location
- 8 January 1198; Septizodium, Rome

Key officials
- Dean: Konrad von Wittelsbach
- Camerlengo: Cencio Savelli
- Protopriest: Guillaume aux Blanches Mains
- Protodeacon: Graziano da Pisa

Election
- Ballots: 2

Elected pope
- Lotario dei Conti di Segni; Name taken: Innocent III
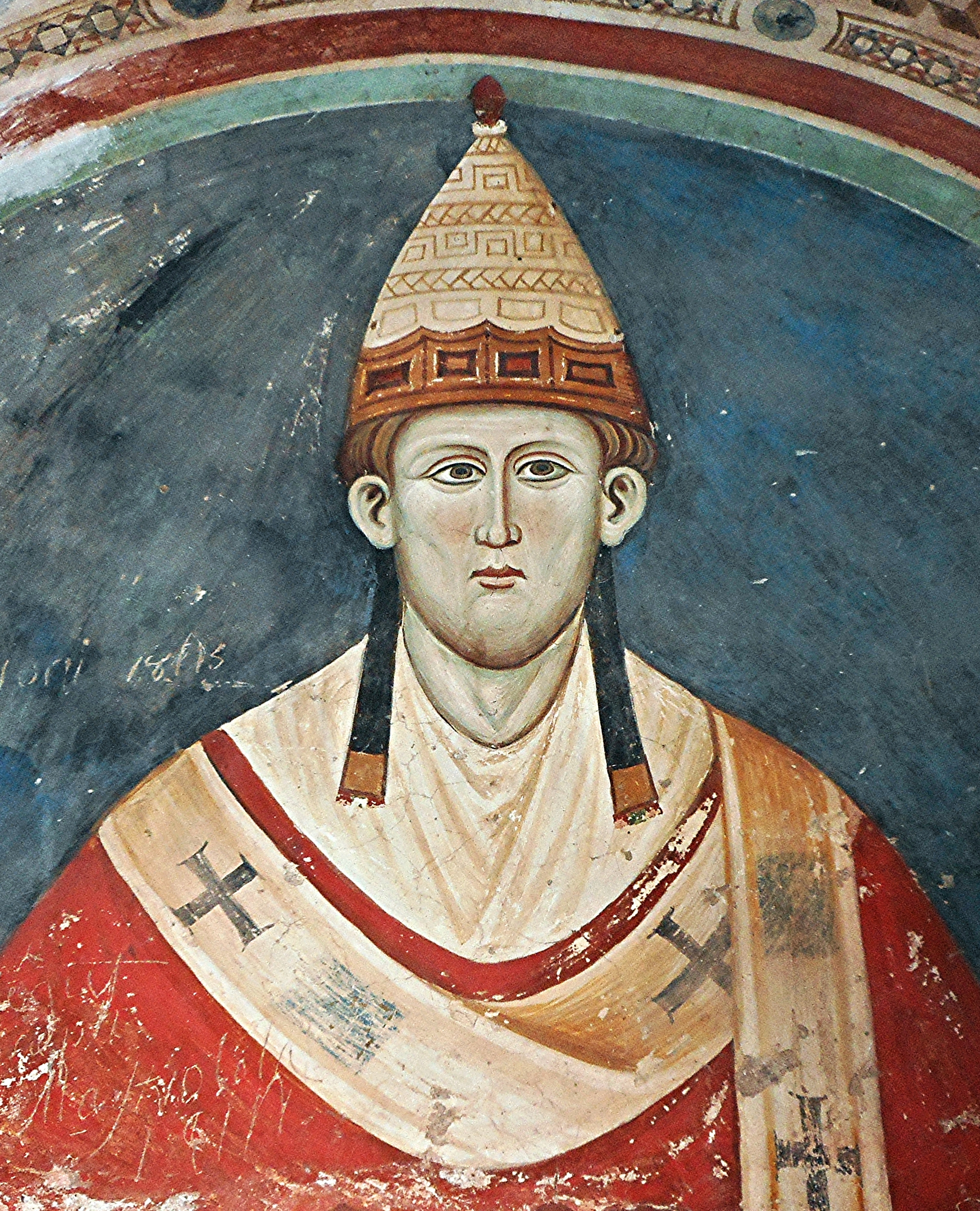

The 1198 papal election (held 8 January) was convoked after the death of Pope Celestine III; it ended with the election of Cardinal Lotario dei Conti di Segni, who took the name Innocent III. In this election for the first time the new pope was elected per scrutinium.

== Death of Celestine III ==
Pope Celestine III had been elected to the papacy in 1191 at the age of 85. In spite of his very advanced age, his pontificate lasted almost seven years.

A little before Christmas 1197, the 91-year-old Pope began to feel ill, and summoned all the cardinals to a meeting in his presence, announcing that they should discuss the matter of electing his successor. He stated that he was willing to abdicate the papacy on condition that his close collaborator, Cardinal Giovanni di San Paolo, be elected the new pope. Cardinal Giovanni, the cardinal-priest of S. Prisca, had been conducting all of the Pope's business for him except the consecration of bishops. The cardinals unanimously rejected the Pope's suggestion, saying that they would not elect him with that condition, and that it was unheard of for a Pope to depose himself. In fact, Cardinal Octavianus, the Bishop of Ostia, was working to become Pope, as were Cardinal Petrus of Porto, Cardinal Giordano of S. Pudenziana, and Cardinal Graziano of Ss. Cosma e Damiano.

Two weeks later, on 8 January 1198, Celestine III died, and on the same day the cardinals started proceedings for the election of his successor.

== List of participants ==
At the death of Celestine III there were 29 cardinals in the Sacred College. However, no more than 21 were present at Rome:

Elector	Cardinalatial title	Elevated	Elevator	Notes
Ottaviano di Paoli	Bishop of Ostia e Velletri	18 December 1182	Lucius III	He consecrated the new pope to the priesthood and episcopate
Pietro Gallocia	Bishop of Porto e Santa Rufina	1188	Clement III	
Soffredo	Priest of S. Prassede	18 December 1182	Lucius III	
Pietro Diani	Priest of S. Cecilia	16 March 1185	Lucius III	
Giordano da Ceccano, O.Cist.	Priest of S. Pudenziana	12 March 1188	Clement III	
Giovanni da Viterbo	Priest of S. Clemente and bishop of Viterbo e Toscanella	May 1189	Clement III	
Guido Papareschi	Priest of S. Maria in Trastevere	22 September 1190	Clement III	
Giovanni di Salerno, O.S.B.Cas.	Priest of S. Stefano in Monte Celio	22 September 1190	Clement III	Elected Pope but declined
Cinzio Cenci	Priest of S. Lorenzo in Lucina	22 September 1190	Clement III	
Ugo Bobone	Priest of SS. Silvestro e Martino	22 September 1190	Clement III	Archpriest of the Vatican Basilica
Giovanni di San Paolo	Priest of S. Prisca	20 February 1193	Celestine III	Celestine III tried to designate him as his successor
Graziano da Pisa	Deacon of SS. Cosma e Damiano	4 March 1178	Alexander III	Protodeacon; he crowned the new pope
Gerardo Allucingoli	Deacon of S. Adriano	18 December 1182	Lucius III	Cardinal-nephew
Gregorio de San Apostolo	Deacon of S. Maria in Portico	12 March 1188	Clement III	
Gregorio Crescenzi	Deacon of S. Maria in Aquiro	12 March 1188	Clement III	
Gregorio Carelli	Deacon of S. Giorgio in Velabro	22 September 1190	Clement III	
Lotario dei Conti di Segni	Deacon of SS. Sergio e Bacco	22 September 1190	Clement III	Cardinal-nephew; elected Pope Innocent III
Gregorio Boboni	Deacon of S. Angelo in Pescheria	22 September 1190	Clement III	
Niccolò Scolari	Deacon of S. Maria in Cosmedin	22 September 1190	Clement III	Cardinal-nephew
Bobo	Deacon of S. Teodoro	20 February 1193	Celestine III	Cardinal-nephew
Cencio	Deacon of S. Lucia in Silice and Camerlengo of the Holy Roman Church	20 February 1193	Celestine III	Acting papal chancellor; future Pope Honorius III (1216–1227); possibly of Savelli family

Four electors were created by Celestine III, five by Lucius III, one by Alexander III and the remaining thirteen by Clement III.

== Absentees ==
At least eight cardinals were absent:

Elector	Cardinalatial title	Elevated	Elevator	Notes
Konrad von Wittelsbach	Bishop of Sabina and Archbishop of Mainz	18 December 1165	Alexander III	prior episcoporum; papal legate in the Holy Land; external cardinal
Guillaume aux Blanches Mains	Priest of S. Sabina and Archbishop of Reims	March 1179	Alexander III	Protopriest; Minister of State of the Kingdom of France; external cardinal
Ruggiero di San Severino	Priest of S. Eusebio and Archbishop of Benevento	Circa 1178–1180	Alexander III	External cardinal
Pandolfo da Lucca	Priest of SS. XII Apostoli	18 December 1182	Lucius III	Papal legate in Tuscany
Adelardo Cattaneo	S.R.E. cardinalis and bishop of Verona	16 March 1185	Lucius III	Resigned the titular church of S. Marcello after the election to the see of Verona in 1188; external cardinal
Bernardo, C.R.S.F.	Priest of S. Pietro in Vincoli	12 March 1188	Clement III	Papal legate in Tuscany and Lombardy
Roffredo dell'Isola, O.S.B.Cas.	Priest of SS. Marcellino e Pietro	1188	Clement III	Abbot of Montecassino; external cardinal
Peter of Capua	Deacon of S. Maria in Via Lata	20 February 1193	Celestine III	He was legate in Bohemia and Poland in 1197. At the death of Celestine III he had already finished this mission but was unable to reach Rome before the election

== Election of Pope Innocent III ==
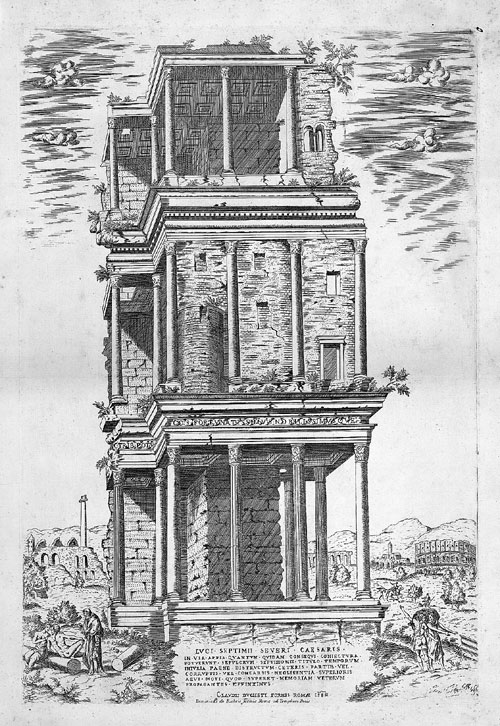
A fragment of the Septizodium as it looked in the 16th century

On the same day that Celestine III died, some of the cardinals assembled at the Sapta Solis monasterii Cliviscauri, which is taken by scholars to be the Septizodium, or possibly in the nearby church of Santa Lucia in Septisolio. Others accompanied the body of the dead pope to its funeral in the Lateran Basilica. Following the return of the cardinals from the funeral, they assembled in voluntary enclosure, as reported by pope Innocent himself on a letter on January 9. This may have been done to guarantee safety and freedom in the election, given the presence and influence of the Germans in Italy.

Now for the first time (secundum morem), the electors voted by scrutiny (per scrutinium). Some cardinals were elected scrutineers; they counted the votes, recorded the result and announced it to the rest of the Sacred College. In the first scrutiny Cardinal Giovanni di Salerno received the greatest number of votes (ten), but declared that he would not accept the election to the pontificate. Ottaviano di Paoli also received three votes, but declared his own preference for Lotario. In the second scrutiny the cardinals united their votes in favor of 37-year-old Cardinal Lotario dei Conti di Segni, deacon of SS. Sergio e Bacco, who was the youngest of all the cardinals. He accepted his election and took the name Innocent III. The name was possibly chosen for him by cardinal Graziano da Pisa, as a means to supplant the memory of Antipope Innocent III.

On 22 February 1198 the new pope was ordained to the priesthood and consecrated to the episcopate by Cardinal Ottaviano di Paoli, bishop of Ostia e Velletri, and solemnly crowned by Cardinal Graziano da Pisa of SS. Cosma e Damiano, the protodeacon.

== Sources ==
- Eubel, Konrad (1913). Hierarchia Catholica Medii Aevi (in Latin). Vol. I. Münster.
- Greenwood, Thomas (1865). Cathedra Petri. Vol. XII, XIII. London: William Macintosh.
- Holder, Karl (1892). Die Designation der Nachfolger durch die Päpste (in German). Freiburg: Weith.
- Jaffé, Philipp (1851). Regesta pontificum Romanorum ab condita Ecclesia ad annum post Christum natum MCXCVIII (in Latin). Berlin: Veit et Socius.
- Maleczek, Werner (1984). Papst und Kardinalskolleg von 1191 bis 1216 (in German). Vienna: M. Schöbel.
- Miranda, Salvador. "Consistory of September 1190 (III)". The Cardinals of the Holy Roman Church.
- Ott, Michael (1910). "Pope Innocent III". The Catholic Encyclopedia. Vol. VIII. Robert Appleton Company.
- Piazzoni, Ambrogio (2003). Historia wyboru papieży (in Polish). Kraków: Wydawnictwo M. ISBN 83-7221-648-7.
- Piazzoni, Ambrogio M. (2003). Storia delle elezioni pontificie Atti, documenti segreti, cronache del tempo e curiosità svelano i retroscena delle quasi trecento elezioni papali dalle origini della Chiesa ai giorni nostri (in Italian) Asti: Piemme. ISBN 8838465398.
- Smith, Damian J (2004). Innocent III and the Crown of Aragon. Aldershot: Ashgate Publishing. ISBN 0-7546-3492-2.
- Julien Théry-Astruc, "Introduction", in Innocent III et le Midi (Cahiers de Fanjeaux, 50), Toulouse, Privat, 2015, p.11-35.
