= 1185 papal election =

Election of Catholic Pope Urban III

Papal election 1185

Dates and location
- 25 November 1185; Verona

Key officials
- Dean: Konrad von Wittelsbach
- Camerlengo: Cardinal Melior
- Protopriest: Alberto di Morra
- Protodeacon: Giacinto Bobone Orsini

Elected pope
- Uberto Crivelli; Name taken: Urban III
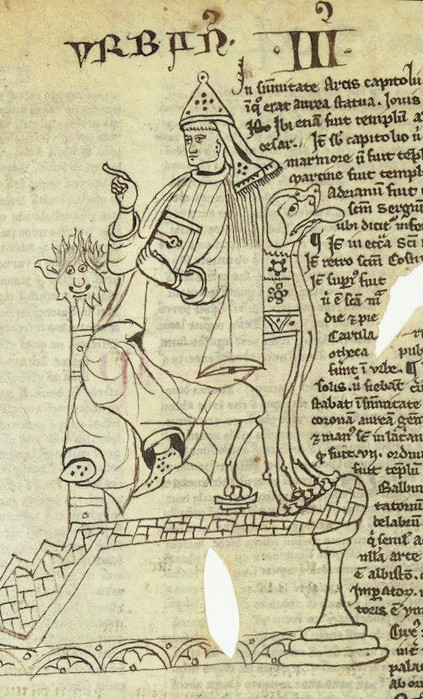

The 1185 papal election (held November 25) was convoked after the death of Pope Lucius III. It resulted in the election of Cardinal Uberto Crivelli of Milan, who took the name of Urban III.

== Besieged in Verona ==
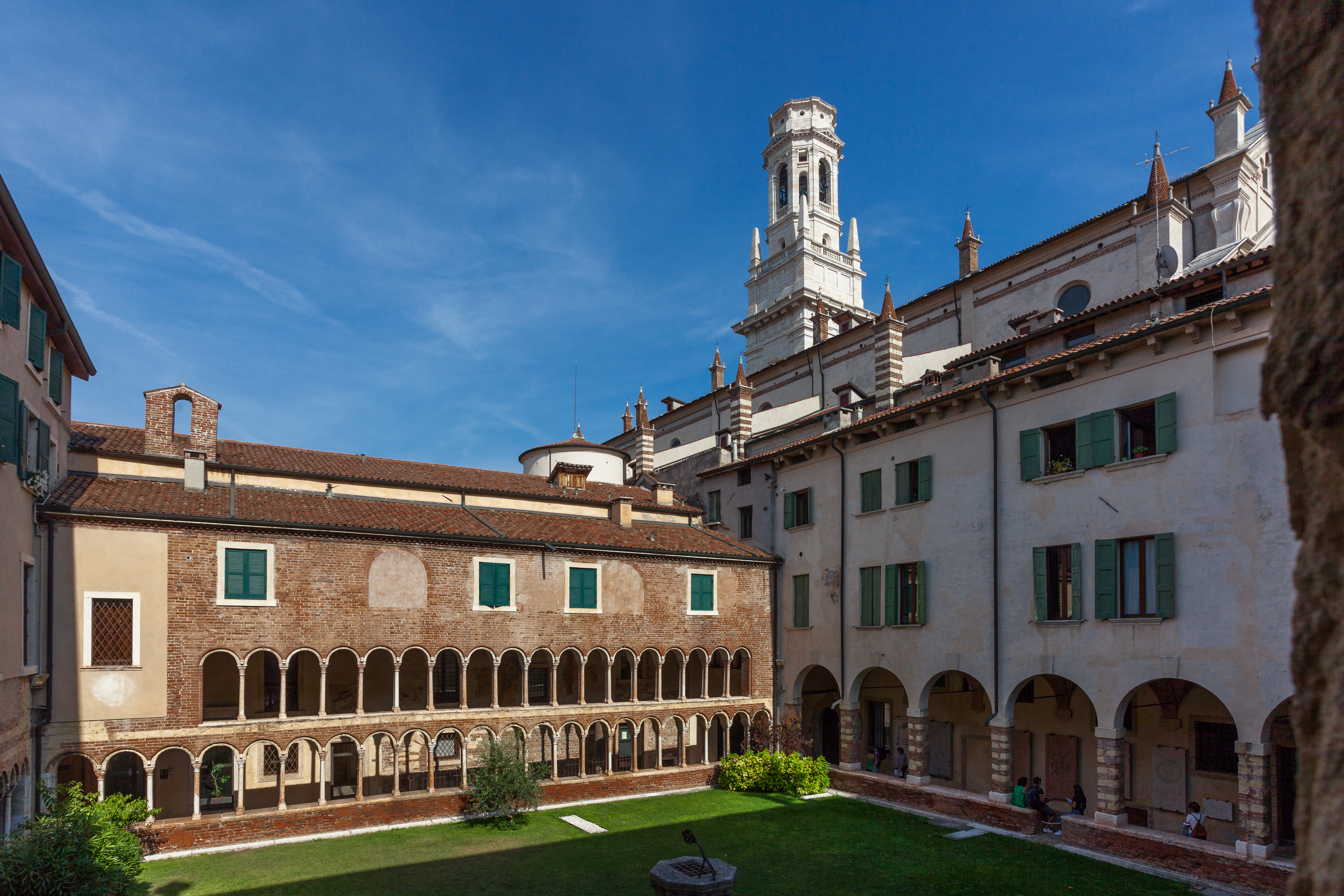
Cloister of the Duomo di Verona. It was almost finished construction in 1185.

Pope Lucius III was elected on 1 September 1181, but had to be consecrated and enthroned at Velletri, due to the hostility of the Romans. But, having refused to grant the consuetudines to the Romans which had been conceded by earlier popes, he was forced to retreat to Velletri. In the meantime, refugees from Tusculum, which had been destroyed earlier in the century by the Roman commune, began to rebuild their fortifications. Annoyed by the challenge, the Roman commune reopened the war, devastated the territory of Tusculum in April 1184, and then turned their wrath against Latium. The pope then fled to the Emperor Frederick Barbarossa, who was at Verona, by way of Ancona, Rimini, Faenza, and Modena. Some of the cardinals followed Pope Lucius to Verona; others, however, whose followers had perpetrated the outrages at Tusculum and in the Roman campagna, remained in the city.

Ten cardinals who were with the refugee pope participated in the consecration of the cathedral of Modena on 14 July 1184. They were: Theodinus of Porto, Tebaldus of Ostia; Joannes of S. Marco, Laborans of S. Maria Transtiberim, Pandulfus of Ss. Apostolorum, Ubertus of S. Lorenzo in Damaso; Ardicio of S. Teodoro, Graziano of Ss. Cosma e Damiano, Goffredfus of S. Maria in Via Lata, and Albinus of S. Maria Nuova.

Discussions between the pope and the emperor quickly turned sour. There was the matter of lay appointment to bishops, and the issue of the inheritance of Mathilda of Tuscany, which had been willed to S. Peter, but which was in imperial hands and of which the emperor insisted he was the feudal overlord. Frustrated and angry, the emperor withdrew to the palace in Pavia. He placed a military cordon around Verona, permitting no one to go to the papal court and allowing no one to leave Verona. Anyone caught was subject to imprisonment and torture.

== List of participants ==
There were probably 26 cardinals in the Sacred College at the death of Lucius III on 25 November 1185. On 11 November 1185, two weeks before the pope's death, eighteen cardinals subscribed a bull in favor of the monastery of S. Peter Lobiensis. This was the last day on which bulls were signed before the pope's death.

Elector	Place of birth	Cardinalatial title	Elevated	Elevator	Notes
Konrad von Wittelsbach	Bavaria	Bishop of Sabina and Archbishop of Mainz	18 December 1165	Alexander III	prior episcoporum. External cardinal.
Theodinus	Arrone	Bishop of Porto e Santa Rufina	18 December 1165	Alexander III	Abbot of Monte Cassino (October 1166–14 September 1167).
Henri de Marsiac, O.Cist.	Château de Marcy, France	Bishop of Albano	March 1179	Alexander III	Seventh Abbot of Clairvaux in (1177-1179). Papal legate,.
Theobald of Ostia, O.S.B.Cluny	France	Bishop of Ostia e Velletri	1184	Lucius III	Abbot of Cluny (1180–1183)
Alberto di Morra, C.R.Praem.	Benevento	Priest of S. Lorenzo in Lucina, and Chancellor of the Holy Roman Church	21 December 1156	Adrian IV	Protopriest; future Pope Gregory VIII (1187)
Joannes Anagninus (Giovanni dei Conti di Anagni)	Anagni	Priest of S. Marco	1158–1159	Adrian IV	Subsequently bishop of Palestrina (1190-1196)
Laborans de Pontormo	Pontormo, near Florence	Priest of S. Maria in Trastevere	21 September 1173	Alexander III	Studied law at the University of Paris, magister and jurisconsult
Uberto Crivelli	Milan	Priest of S. Lorenzo in Damaso	September 1173	Lucius III	Canon and Archdeacon of the cathedral chapter of Bourges. Archbishop of Milan. Elected Pope Urban III
Pandolfo	Lucca	Priest of SS. XII Apostoli	18 December 1182	Lucius III	Canon of the cathedral chapter in Lucca, then sub-deacon.
Albino, C.R.S.F.	Gaeta (?)	Priest of S. Croce in Gerusalemme	18 December 1182	Lucius III	Magister and theologian. Future bishop of Albano (1189-1197)
Melior, O.S.B.Vall.	Pisa	Priest of SS. Giovanni e Paolo	16 March 1185	Lucius III	Camerlengo of the Holy Roman Church
Adelardo Cattaneo	Verona	Priest of S. Marcello	16 March 1185	Lucius III	Future bishop of Verona (1188-1214)
Ardicio Rivoltella	Piadena near Cremona	Deacon of S. Teodoro	21 December 1156	Adrian IV	
Graziano da Pisa	Pisa	Deacon of SS. Cosma e Damiano	4 March 1178	Alexander III	Nephew of Pope Eugenius III
Soffredo	Pistoia	Deacon of S. Maria in Via Lata	18 December 1182	Lucius III	Canon of the cathedral chapter of Pistoia
Pietro Diani	Piacenza	Deacon of S. Nicola in Carcere	16 March 1185	Lucius III	Provost of S. Antonino, Piacenza. Apostolic subdeacon. Future papal legate.
Radulfus Nigellus	Pisa (?) or France	Deacon of S. Giorgio in Velabro	16 March 1185	Lucius III	
Rolandus	Pisa	Deacon of S. Maria in Portico	16 March 1185	Lucius III	Former bishop-elect of Dol (1177-1185)

Ten electors were created by Pope Lucius III, five by Pope Alexander III, and three by Pope Adrian IV.

== Absentee cardinals ==
Elector	Place of birth	Cardinalatial title	Elevated	Elevator	Notes
Paolo Scolari	Rome	Bishop of Palestrina	21 September 1179	Alexander III	Archpriest of the Liberian Basilica; future Pope Clement III (1187-1191)
Pietro de Bono, C.R.S.M.R.	Verona	Priest of S. Susanna	18 March 1166	Alexander III	Canons Regular of Santa Maria of Reno, Bologna. Then papal legate.
Ruggiero di San Severino O.S.B.	San Severino	Priest of S. Eusebio and Archbishop of Benevento	Ca. 1178–80	Alexander III	First monk at Monte Cassino then Archbishop of Benevento. External cardinal
Guillaume aux Blanches Mains	France	Priest of S. Sabina and Archbishop of Reims	March 1179	Alexander III	Minister of State of the Kingdom of France; external cardinal
Giacinto Bobone Orsini	Rome	Deacon of S. Maria in Cosmedin	22 December 1144	Lucius II	Protodeacon; future Pope Celestine III (1191-1198)
Bobo	Rome	Deacon of S. Angelo in Pescheria	18 December 1182	Lucius III	He was papal legate in France from mid-1184 to spring 1186. Future bishop of Porto e Santa Rufina (1189-1190)
Ottaviano di Poli	Rome	Deacon of SS. Sergio e Bacco	18 December 1182	Lucius III	Subsequently bishop of Ostia e Velletri (1189-1206)
Gerardo	Lucca	Deacon of S. Adriano	18 December 1182	Lucius III	Canon of the cathedral chapter of Lucca. Future Papal Vicar of Rome; Cardinal-nephew (?) of Lucius III

Four absentees were appointed by Alexander III, three by Lucius III, one by Adrian IV, and one by Pope Lucius II.

== Death of Lucius III and the election of Pope Urban III ==
Pope Lucius III died at Verona on 25 November 1185, at very advanced age. On that same day, eighteen cardinals started proceedings to elect his successor. Majority of them came from Northern Italy and formed a radically anti-imperial faction, while more moderate cardinals (mostly Romans) were absent. In such circumstances, Northern Italian cardinals quickly secured the election of their candidate Uberto Crivelli of Milan. Crivelli was widely known to have a long-standing rancor against Barbarossa, who had singled out his family and followers when he had conquered Milan, some of whom he ordered to be executed, others to be mutilated. In the words of Ferdinand Gregorovius, he was "... a violent and unyielding spirit, and a strong opponent of Frederick." He was unanimously elected within a few hours after the death of Lucius III, and took the name Urban III. He was crowned at Verona in S. Pietro in monte, on 1 December 1185.

After his election to the papacy, he retained the administration of the metropolitan see of Milan.

== Sources ==
- Gregorovius, Ferdinand (1896). The History of Rome in the Middle Ages Vol. IV, part 2. London: George Bell 1896.
- Jaffé, Philipp (1888). Regesta pontificum Romanorum ab condita Ecclesia ad annum post Christum natum MCXCVIII (in Latin). Vol. II. Leipzig.
- Kartusch, Elfriede (1948). Das Kardinalskollegium in der Zeit von 1181–1227. Wien.
- Robinson, Ian Stuart (1990). The Papacy, 1073–1198: Continuity and Innovation. New York: Cambridge University Press. ISBN 0521264987.
- Watterich, J. B. M. (1862). Pontificum Romanorum qui fuerunt inde ab exeunte saeculo IX usque ad finem saeculi XIII vitae: ab aequalibus conscriptae (in Latin). Vol. Tomus II. Leipzig: G. Engelmann.
