= Cardinals created by Clement III =

Catholic appointments from 1188 to 1190

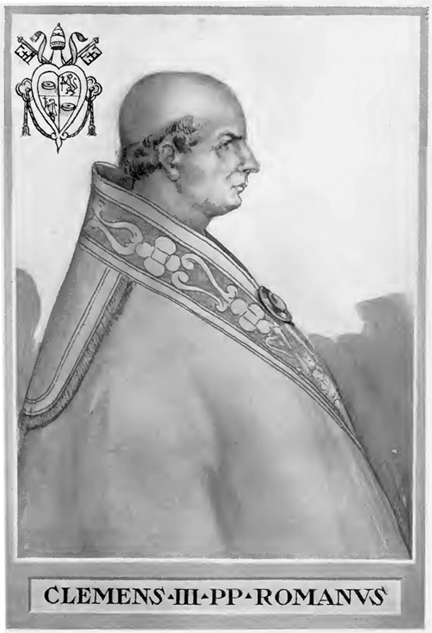
Pope Clement III.

Pope Clement III (r. 1187–91) created 30 cardinals in three consistories held during his pontificate; this included the elevation of his future successor Pope Innocent III in 1190.

== 12 March 1188 ==
- Gérard Mainard O.Cist.
- Pietro
- Alessio
- Giordano da Ceccano O.Cist.
- Pietro
- Pietro
- Giovanni Malabranca
- Gregorio de San Apostolo
- Giovanni Felici
- Bernardo Can. Reg.
- Gregorio Crescenzi

== May 1189 ==
- Giovanni
- Alessandro
- Giovanni

== September 1190 ==
- Pietro Gallozia
- Rufino
- Rinaldo O.S.B.
- Guy Paré O.Cist.
- Cencio
- Ugo
- Giovanni di Salerno O.S.B. Cas.
- Romano
- Egidio di Anagni
- Gregorio Carelli
- Lotario dei Conti di Segni (Note: Elected as Pope Innocent III in 1198 and reigned until his death in 1216.)
- Gregorio
- Niccolò Scolari
- Guido de Papa
- Giovanni Barrata
- Niccolò

== Sources ==
- Miranda, Salvador. "Consistories for the creation of Cardinals 12th Century (1099-1198): Clement III (1187-1191)". The Cardinals of the Holy Roman Church. Florida International University. OCLC 53276621.
