= 1191 papal election =

Election of Catholic Pope Celestine III

Papal election 1191

Dates and location
- 21 March 1191; Rome

Key officials
- Dean: Conrad of Wittelsbach
- Camerlengo: Cencio Savelli
- Protodeacon: Giacinto Bobone

Elected pope
- Giacinto Bobone; Name taken: Celestine III
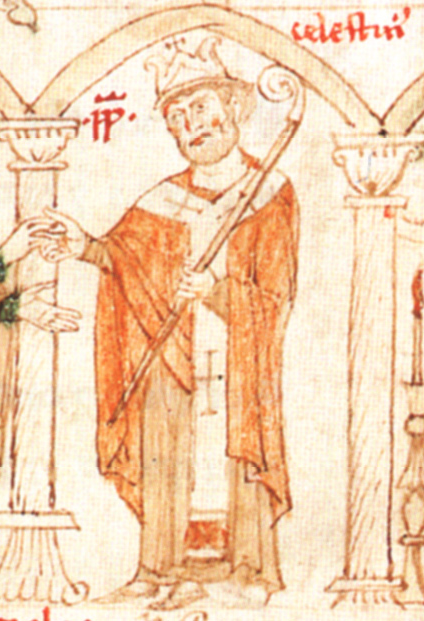

The 1191 papal election took place after the death of Pope Clement III. Pope Clement, according to differing and irreconcilable reports, died in March 1191, in the last third of the month, on the 20th, the 25th, the 26th, the 28th, or perhaps 2 April or 4 April, or 10 April. The election was conducted during the march of King Henry VI and his army toward Rome. The 85-year-old Cardinal Giacinto Bobone, a member of the Orsini family, was chosen after some extreme reluctance. He took the name Celestine III. Pressed by the Romans, however, he agreed to negotiate with King Henry about his coronation as emperor and about the possession of the city of Tusculum. Celestine postponed his own consecration in order to buy time to negotiate. He was finally crowned on Easter Sunday, 14 April 1191.

== Death of Clement III ==
King Henry crossed into Italy in mid-winter, and was in Bologna by 11 February 1191; on 22 February he was at Lucca, and on the 26th at Pisa. He had sent representatives (nuntios) to Pope Clement, and to the cardinals and the senators of Rome, requesting his coronation and promising that he would in all matters preserve unharmed the laws and dignities of the Roman people. Henry intended to march into south Italy and claim the kingdom of William II of Sicily for his wife and himself, and, since the kingdom of Sicily was a papal fief, Henry needed the active cooperation of the pope.

In March 1191, Henry and his army were in Tuscany. Two cardinals had been sent by the pope to negotiate with him, Petrus Gallocia the Bishop of Porto and Petrus the Cardinal priest of S. Pietro in Vincoli. Before he died, Clement had agreed to the demand of Henry VI for an imperial coronation in Rome at Easter. The Roman leaders were not impressed by Clement's promises, since he had promised them at the beginning of his reign that he would hand over Tusculum to them, and had yet to do so.

Clement's latest known dated bull was signed on 20 March 1191.

Pope Clement III died on 20 March 1191.

== Cardinals ==
The sources do not mention any of the cardinals who elected Cardinal Giacinto of S. Maria in Cosmedin. A list must be constructed by deduction and inference. The cardinals who subscribed documents for Clement III is far smaller than the total number of cardinals alive at his death.

=== New cardinals ===
Pope Clement III (1187–1191) had appointed 25 or 26 cardinals:

- Joannes of San Clemente, Bishop of Viterbo and Tuscanella.
- Aegidius Pierleoni of S. Nicola in Carcere.
- Bobo of San Giorgio in Velabro (died 1189)
- Cinthius of S. Lorenzo in Lucina
- Gregorius of S. Angelo in Pescheria
- Gregorius de Caballo of Santa Maria in Aquiro.
- Guido de Papa, cardinal priest of Santa Maria in Trastevere.
- Hugo Pirovano (or Bobone) of S. Silvestro e Martino.
- Joannes Felix of Sant'Eustachio
- Joannes de Malabranca of S. Teodoro.
- Petrus Gallocia of Porto.
- Lothar di Segni of Ss. Sergio e Baccho.
- Gregorius de Monte Carello of S. Giorgio in Velabro
- Alexius de Arcipetris of Santa Susanna (1188–1189; died under Clement III).
- Jordanus de Ceccano of Santa Pudenziana.
- Joannes de Salerno of Santo Stefano al Monte Celio
- Goffredus (Roffredo) de Insula of Ss. Marcellino e Pietro, Abbot of Montecassino (1188–1210).
- Rufinus of Santa Prassede, Bishop of Rimini.
- Barnardus of S. Maria Nuova
- Gregorius de S. Apostolo of S. Maria in Porticu.
- Petrus of S. Clemente (died under Clement III).
- Petrus of San Lorenzo in Damaso (died under Clement III ?).
- Niccolò Scolari, cardinal deacon of Santa Lucia in Selci.
- Romanus, cardinal deacon.

At least 18 of Pope Clement's appointees were Italians, and 11 of the appointees were native Romans.

=== Likely attendees ===
A beginning on the list of cardinals who may have attended the election of March or April 1191, in addition to some or all of the new cardinals, may be derived from a privilege granted by Pope Clement III to the monastery of Compiègne on 17 February 1191, about five weeks before his death. Eighteen cardinals who subscribed the document were:

- Octavianus, Cardinal Bishop of Ostia and Velletri.
- Joannes Anagninus (Giovanni dei Conti di Anagni), Cardinal Bishop of Palestrina.
- Pandolfo da Lucca, Cardinal Priest of XII Santi Apostoli.
- Petrus, Cardinal Priest of Sancti Petri ad Vincula, tituli Eudoxie.
- Aegidius Pierleoni (Egidio di Anagni), Cardinal Deacon of San Nicola in Carcere Tulliano.
- Cinthius, Cardinal Priest of S. Lorenzo in Lucina
- Gregorius, Cardinal Deacon of Sant'Angelo in Pescheria.
- Guido de Papa, cardinal priest of Santa Maria in Trastevere, tituli Calixti.
- Hugo Pirovano (or Bobone), Cardinal Priest of S. Silvestro e Martino, tituli Equitii.
- Johannes Felix, Cardinal Priest of Santa Susanna, Rome.
- Pietro Gallocia, Cardinal-Bishop of Porto e Santa Rufina.
- Lothar di Segni, Cardinal Deacon of Santi Sergio e Bacco.
- Gregorius de Monte Carello, Cardinal Deacon of S. Giorgio in Velabro.
- Joannes de Salerno, Cardinal Priest of Santo Stefano al Monte Celio.
- Rufinus, Cardinal Priest of Santa Prassede, Bishop of Rimini.
- Barnardus, Cardinal Deacon of S. Maria Nuova.
- Niccolò Scolari, Cardinal Deacon of Santa Lucia in Selci.
- Romanus, Cardinal Priest of Sant'Anastasia al Palatino.

In addition,

- Albinus, Bishop of Albano, Vicar of Rome.
- Jacintus, Cardinal Deacon of Santa Maria in Cosmedin.
- Gerardus Allucingoli, Cardinal Deacon of Sant'Adriano al Foro.
- Gratianus de Pisa, Cardinal deacon of Ss. Cosma e Damiano.
- Soffredus, Cardinal Deacon of Santa Maria in Via Lata.

=== Cardinals not attending ===
- ? Conrad of Wittelsbach, Bishop of Sabina and Archbishop of Mainz.
- Guillaume aux Blanches Mains, Archbishop of Reims, papal legate, uncle and principal advisor of King Philip II of France
- Rogerius, OSB Cas., Cardinal Priest of Sant'Eusebio. Archbishop of Benevento (1179–1221).
- Adelardus Cattaneus, Cardinal Priest of S. Marcello. In August 1190, Adelardus was papal legate in the Holy Land. On 16 July 1191, he and other bishops consecrated the church at Akko.
- Petrus Dianus, Cardinal-priest of S. Cecilia, was papal legate in Lombardy until June 1193.
- Goffredus (Roffredo) de Insula of Ss. Marcellino e Pietro, Abbot of Montecassino (1188–1210).
- Melior of Ss. Giovanni e Paolo, Bishop of Massa Maritima.

== Election ==
Ralph of Diceto, Dean of London, indicates that there was dissension among the cardinals: The fear was that it might lead to schism among them, and it was only with that consideration that the senior cardinal deacon, Iacintus, agreed to his election to the papal throne. The disagreement was undoubtedly over the agreement made by Henry VI and Clement III, that Tusculum would be handed over to the Romans, an abandonment of longstanding papal policy fortified by treaty. The Continuator of Sigebert of Gembloux remarks on both the dissension and the duplicity among the Romans and the cardinals.

Cardinal Iacintus took the name Celestine III.

When Pope Celestine saw King Henry approaching, he put off his own consecration in order to postpone Henry's.

After the election, and before King Henry could draw near Rome, the Roman leaders petitioned Pope Celestine not to anoint and crown Henry emperor until the Pope should obtain agreement from him that the city of Tusculum would be turned over to them. The city had been placed in Pope Clement's custody, but the Tusculans had turned to the king and invoked his patrocinia. The Romans vigorously pressed (instantissime proponentes) on the pope that this was the way to get Tusculum into Roman hands, as the previous agreement had specified. Celestine agreed to their proposal. He immediately sent negotiators (nuntios) to the king, who firmly proposed to him that, in the light of the previous agreement between the pope and the Romans (at the beginning of Clement's reign), it was necessary for Tusculum to be handed over to the pope by the king.

On Holy Saturday, 13 April, Celestine III was proceeding from the Lateran palace to St. Peter's, where he would be consecrated the next day. He came face to face with King Henry and Queen Constanza and an armed group of people. The Romans had closed the gates of the city and were heavily guarding them, keeping the imperial party from entering.

Celestine III (Giacinto Bobone) was ordained a priest on Holy Saturday, 13 April 1191; he was consecrated a bishop and enthroned on Easter Sunday, 14 April 1191. His consecrator was Cardinal Octavianus de Poli, Bishop of Ostia.

Thanks to the pact made between Henry VI and Celestine III, the city of Tusculum was attacked by the Romans, and completely destroyed on 17 April 1191.

== Sources ==
- Baaken, Katrin (1985). "Zu Wahl, Weihe und Krönung Papst Cölestins III.," (in German) In: Deutsches Archiv für Erforschung des Mittelalters 41 (1985), 203–211.
- Ganzer, Klaus (1963). Die Entwicklung des auswärtigen Kardinalats im hohen Mittelalter. Ein Beitrag zur Geschichte des Kardinalkollegiums vom 11.bis 13. Jahrhundert. Bibliothek des Deutschen Historischen Instituts in Rom (in German). Tübingen: Max Niemeyer Verlag.
- Gregorovius, Ferdinand (1896). The History of Rome in the Middle Ages Vol. IV, part 2. London: George Bell 1896.
- Jaffé, Philipp (1888). Regesta pontificum Romanorum ab condita Ecclesia ad annum post Christum natum MCXCVIII (in Latin). Vol. II. Leipzig.
- Kartusch, Elfriede (1948). Das Kardinalskollegium in der Zeit von 1181–1227. Wien: Max Niemeyer.
- Watterich, J. B. M. (1862). Pontificum Romanorum qui fuerunt inde ab exeunte saeculo IX usque ad finem saeculi XIII vitae: ab aequalibus conscriptae (in Latin). Vol. Tomus II. Leipzig: G. Engelmann.
