= Cardinals created by Celestine III =

Catholic appointments from 1191 to 1195

Pope Celestine III (r. 1191–98) created eleven cardinals in six consistories. The exact dates for some of these consistories are not known.

== April or May 1191 ==
- Niccolò Bobone (Cardinal-Deacon of Santa Maria in Cosmedin)

== 2 June 1191 ==
- Roffredo dell'Isola O.S.B. Cas. (Cardinal-Priest of Santi Marcellino e Pietro)

== 1191 ==
- Guido (Cardinal-Priest of San Marco)
- Giacomo Cesarini (Cardinal-Priest of Santa Prassede)

== May 1192 ==
- Albert of Louvain (Cardinal-Deacon)

== 20 February 1193 ==
- Giovanni di San Paolo O.S.B. (Cardinal-Deacon)
- Fidanzio (Cardinal-Priest of San Marcello)
- Pietro Capuano (Cardinal-Deacon of Santa Maria in Via Lata)
- Bobone of San Teodoro (Cardinal-Deacon of San Teodoro)
- Cencio Savelli (Cardinal-Deacon of Santa Lucia in Orphea)

== 1195 ==
- Simon de Limbourg (Cardinal-Deacon)

== Sources ==
- Miranda, Salvador. "Consistories for the creation of Cardinals 12th Century (1099-1198): Celestine III (1191-1198)". The Cardinals of the Holy Roman Church. Florida International University. OCLC 53276621.
