= Rolandus (bishop of Dol) =

Bishop of Dol

Cardinal Rolandus
- Cardinal-Deacon
- Church: Santa Maria in Portico (1185-1187)
- Diocese: Dol (1177-1187)
- Other post: Dean of Avranches

Orders
- Created cardinal: 15 March 1185 by Pope Lucius III
- Rank: Cardinal Deacon

Personal details
- Born: Pisa
- Died: 1187 Verona ?
- Residence: Rome, Verona
- Occupation: diplomat, courtier
- Profession: cleric

Rolandus (died c. 1187) was a cardinal of the Roman Catholic Church. He was a native of Pisa, not Siena or Brittany. He was elected archbishop of Dol, but was not consecrated for five years, due to the opposition his metropolitan, the archbishop of Tours. Before he became a cardinal, he was sent by Pope Lucius III as his representative to Scotland to attempt to resolve a dispute over episcopal elections, involving the king.

== Life ==
Rolandus held the title of Magister. He was Dean of the cathedral chapter of Avranches.

He was elected archbishop of Dol on 11 November 1177, the Feast of St. Martin. Due to the persistent objections of the archbishop of Tours, however, his consecration as bishop did not take place until 1182.

=== Scotland ===
Pope Lucius III named him a subdeacon of the Holy Roman Church, and, in 1181, sent him to Scotland ex parte papae to bring about a reconciliation between William the Lion and Bishop Joannes of Saint Andrews. He was associated in his mission with Abbot Silvanus of Rievaulx (1167–1188). Joannes had been elected by the chapter of St. Andrews, but without the knowledge or consent of the king, who intruded his own chaplain, Hugh, as the bishop instead. Rolandus and Silvanus were unable to bring the parties to agree to a solution, and in the summer of 1182 wrote a letter to Pope Lucius, stating that he had ordered the parties to appear before the pope by 1 October. Rolandus returned to Rome. The controversy continued until 1188.

=== Verona ===
Rolandus was named a cardinal deacon at Verona on 15 March 1185 by Pope Lucius III, and assigned the deaconry of S. Maria in Porticu. He began subscribing documents for Pope Lucius, according to present evidence, on 4 April 1185. He was one of thirteen cardinals who subscribed a bull in favor of the monastery of Ss. Peter and Vitus de Caleva at Verona on 13 June 1185. He was among the seventeen cardinals who subscribed a bull in favor of the monastery of S. Biagio Admunt on 22 July 1185. He subscribed again on 22 August 1185, on 18 October, and on 5 November.

Pope Lucius III died on 25 November 1185, still residing in Verona, while an angry and uncooperative emperor resided at the imperial headquarters in Pavia. The election of his successor, in which Cardinal Rolandus took part, was held on the next day. It was brief and unanimous. The successful candidate was Humbertus Crivelli, the Archbishop of Milan and Cardinal of S. Lorenzo in Damaso, " a violent and unyielding spirit, and a strong opponent of Frederick (Barbarossa)," in the words of Ferdinand Gregorovius. He took the name Urban III, and maintained all of the uncompromising policies of Lucius III. He and the papal court continued as virtual prisoners in Verona. On 16 December 1185, in Verona, Cardinal Rolandus subscribed a privilege for the church of S. Peter in Soissons. He subscribed a privilege for the monastery of the Holy Trinity in Lucerne on 11 January 1186 in Verona. He subscribed again on 20 January, 27 January 5 February, 27 February, 4 March, 13 March, 15 March, 23 March, 31 May, 2 June, 13 June, 17 June, 26 June, 14 July, 26 July, 11 August, 30 August, 4 September, 20 September, 10 December.

Rolandus and Cardinal Soffredus of S. Maria in Via lata, with the authority of Pope Urban III and with his mandate, defined the parish boundaries between the churches of S. Paolo and S. Vitale in Verona on 16 August 1186.

In 1187, still trapped in Verona, Cardinal Rolandus subscribed documents for Pope Urban III on 6 January, 7 January, 2 March, 7 March, 12 March, 26 March, 21 May, 22 May, 26 May, and 2 June. Rolandus' latest known subscription took place in Verona on 21 September 1187. Urban and the cardinals who were besieged with him were able to escape from Verona in the last weeks of September 1187, taking refuge in Ferrara. Urban died there on 20 October 1187.

Cardinal Rolandus died after 21 September 1187. His successor as Cardinal deacon of S. Maria in Porticu, Gregorius de S. Apostolo, subscribed as early as 12 April 1188.

== Sources ==
- Ciaconius (Chacón), Alphonsus (1677). Agostinus Olduinus (ed.). Vitae et res gestae pontificum romanorum: et S.R.E. cardinalium (in Latin). Vol. Tomus primus (2nd ed.). Roma: P. et A. De Rubeis. p. 1120.
- Duchesne, François (1660). Histoire de tous les cardinaux françois (in French) 2 vols. (Paris 1660).
- Duchesne, Francois (1660). Les Preuves du livre premier de l' histoire de tous les cardinaux françois (in French) (Paris 1660). p. 141.
- Ganzer, Klaus (1963). Die Entwicklung des auswärtigen Kardinalats im hohen Mittelalter. Ein Beitrag zur Geschichte des Kardinalkollegiums vom 11.bis 13. Jahrhundert (in German). Tübingen: Max Niemeyer. p. 137.
- Jaffé, Philipp (1888). Regesta pontificum Romanorum ab condita Ecclesia ad annum post Christum natum MCXCVIII (in Latin). Vol. II. Leipzig.
- Kartusch, Elfriede (1948). Das Kardinalskollegium in der Zeit von 1181–1227 (in German). Wien.
- "Roland d'Avranches." (in French) Histoire litteraire de la France. Tome XIV. Paris: Firmin Didot 1817. P. 624.
- Histoire litteraire de la France. Tome XV. (in French) Paris: Firmin Didot 1817. P. 315.
