= Guy Paré =

French Cistercian

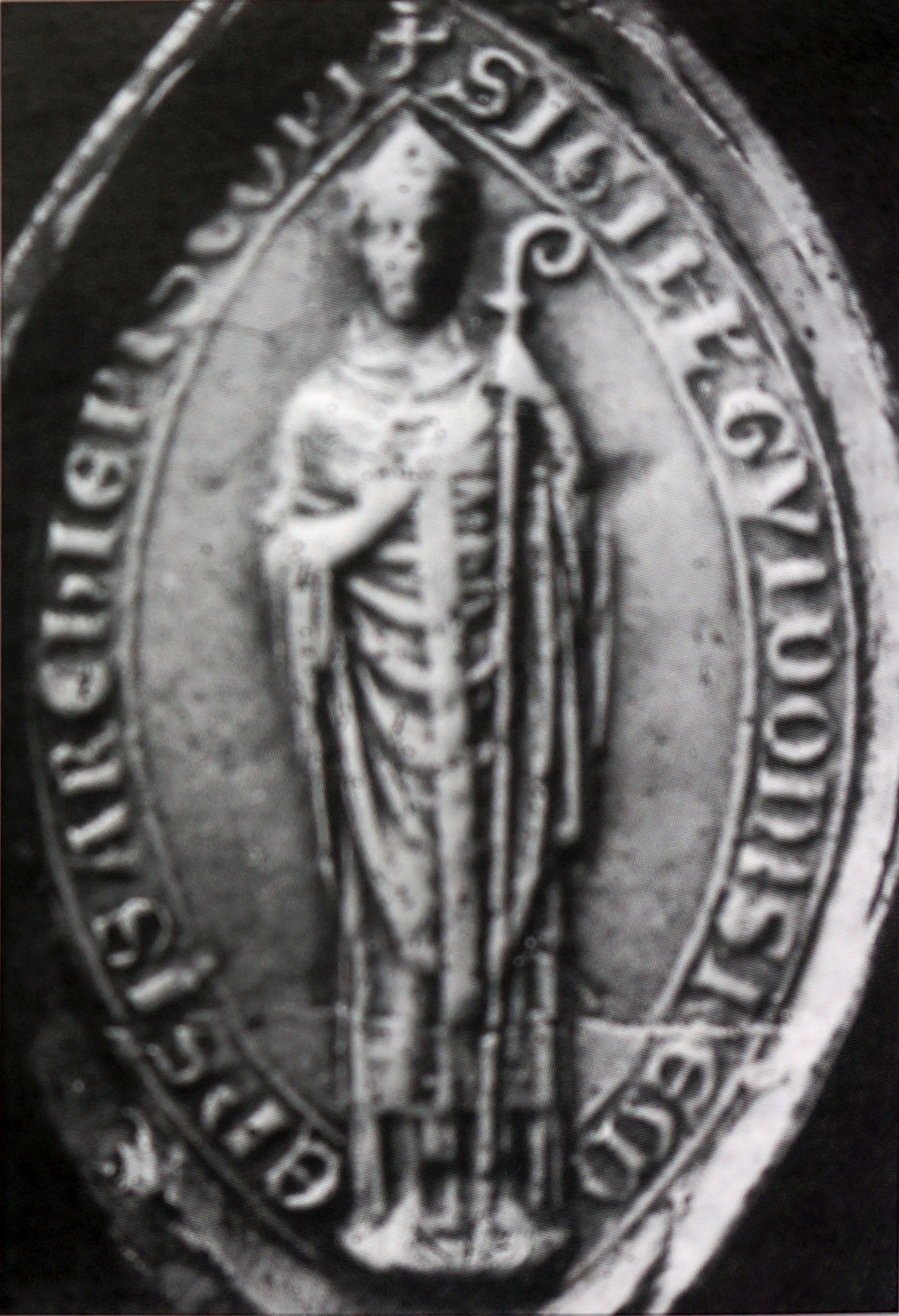
Sceau Gui Paré Portrait

Guy Paré (died 1206) was a French Cistercian, who became general of his order, Archbishop of Reims, and a Cardinal.

== Biography ==
In the consistory of September 1190, he was elevated to the cardinalate by Pope Clement III, receiving the title of Santa Maria in Trastevere. As a cardinal, he took part in the 1191 Papal election (in which Pope Celestine III was elected) and that of 1198 (in which Pope Innocent III was elected).

He was a papal legate to Germany. In 1204 he was made Archbishop by Pope Innocent III; this position also made him a pair de France. In 1205 Innocent conferred on him the privilege of consecrating the Kings of France.

He died in Liège of the plague, while engaged on a papal diplomatic mission. He is buried at Citeaux.

== Notes ==
Catholic Church titles
Preceded by Guillaume aux Blanches Mains	Archbishop of Reims; 1204–1206	Succeeded by Aubrey
