= Pietro Gallocia =

Roman Catholic cardinal

- Cardinal-Bishop of Porto e Santa Rufina
- Installed: 1190
- Term ended: 1211
- Previous post: Cardinal-Deacon

Orders
- Created cardinal: 1188 by Pope Clement III
- Rank: Cardinal-Bishop

Personal details
- Born: c. 1120/1130 Rome
- Died: March 14, 1211 Rome

Pietro Gallocia or Galluzzi (c. 1120/30 in Rome – 14 March 1211 in Rome) was a Roman cardinal.

He was apostolic subdeacon and governor of Campagna in the pontificate of Pope Alexander III (1159-1181). Pope Clement III created him Cardinal-Deacon in 1188 and named him Cardinal-Bishop of Porto e Santa Rufina in 1190. He participated in the 1191 papal election and the 1198 papal election. Papal legate in Constantinople 1191–92.

In 1204, he consecrated King Peter II of Aragon, who was solemnly crowned by the Pope Innocent III. He became Dean of the Sacred College of Cardinals in April 1206. He died at Rome at very advanced age.

== Sources ==
- Werner Maleczek, Papst und Kardinalskolleg von 1191 bis 1216, Wien 1984, p. 95-96
