= Gerardo Allucingoli =

Italian cardinal and cardinal-nephew of Pope Lucius III

Gerardo Allucingoli (died 1208) was an Italian cardinal and cardinal-nephew of Pope Lucius III, who elevated him in 1182.

He was canon of the cathedral chapter in his native city of Lucca, in the March of Tuscany.

After the election of his uncle to the papacy (1 September 1181), he was named cardinal-deacon of Santo Adriano (probably in December 1182), and then Camerlengo of the Holy Roman Church (ca.1182/84). He signed the papal bulls between 2 January 1183 and 19 April 1204. He was Cardinal Vicar General of Rome from 1184 until 1188. He participated in the papal election, 1191 and papal election, 1198. He was elected bishop of Lucca in 1195 but Pope Celestine III did not ratify this election. Legate in various parts of Italy on several occasions. Cardinal-protodeacon from 1205. Pope Innocent III appointed him spiritual and secular vicar of the Kingdom of Sicily in April 1204. His name appears for the last time in the document dated 20 July 1208.

== Bibliography ==
- Maleczek, Werner (1984). Papst und Kardinalskolleg von 1191 bis 1216: die Kardinäle unter Coelestin III. und Innocenz III. Wien 1984, pp. 78–79.
