= San Marcello al Corso =

San Marcello
- Church of Saint Marcellus on the Corso (in English); S. Marcelli (in Latin)
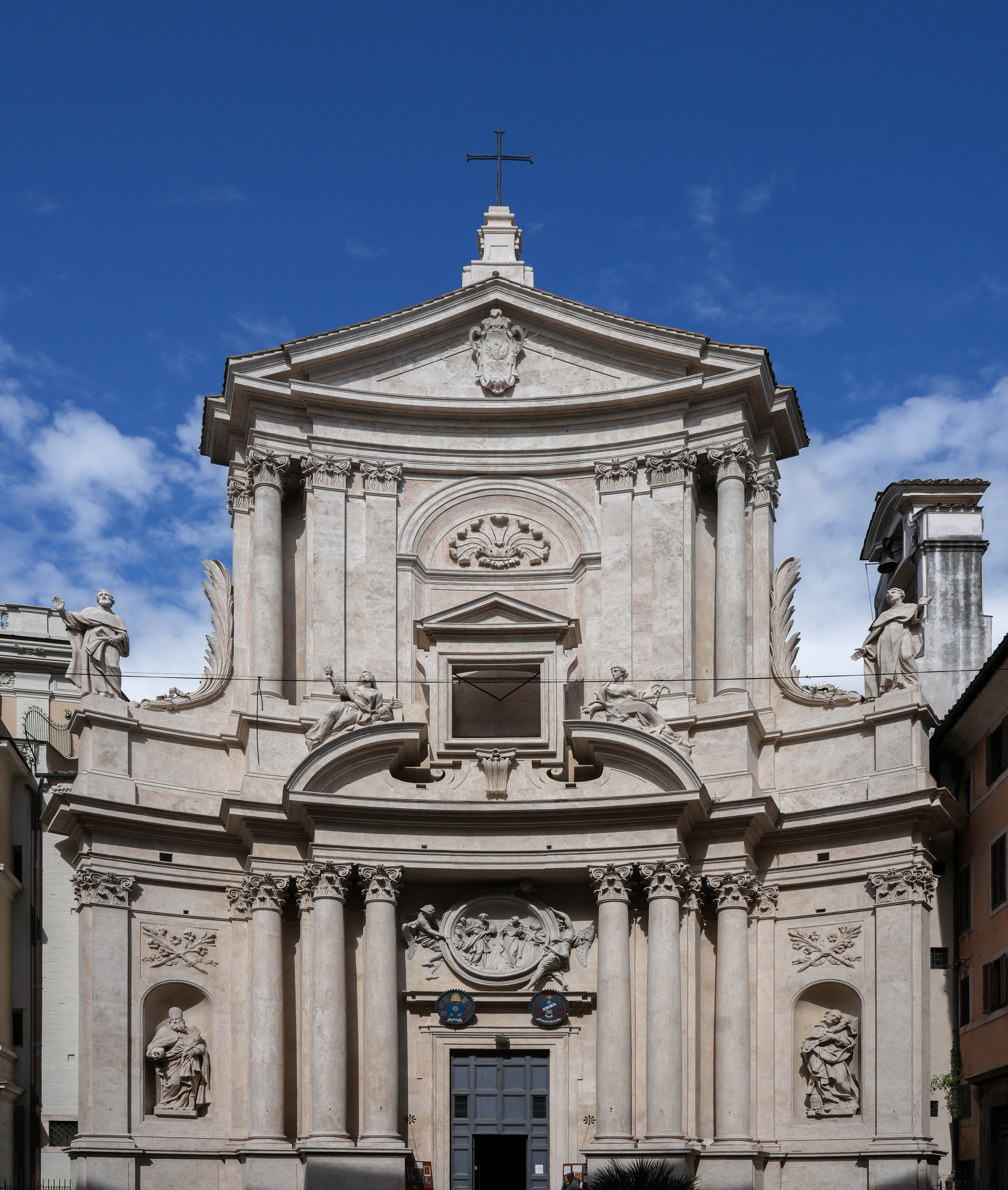
- Facade
- Click on the map for a fullscreen view.
- 41°53′55.25″N 12°28′54.34″E
- Location: Piazza di San Marcello 5, Rome
- Country: Italy
- Denomination: Roman Catholic
- Tradition: Latin Church
- Religious order: Servite Order

History
- Status: Titular church General Curia of the Order of Servants of the Blessed Virgin Mary (Servites)
- Founded: before 418 AD
- Dedication: Pope St. Marcellus I: Seven Sorrows of Mary; Seven Holy Founders of the Servite Order; Bl. Cecilia Eusepi; St Phocas; St’s Digna and Emerita; Fragment of True Cross

Architecture
- Architect(s): Jacopo Sansovino, Carlo Fontana
- Architectural type: Church
- Style: Baroque
- Groundbreaking: 1592
- Completed: 1697

San Marcello al Corso is an ancient titular and conventual church in Rome, Italy. It has been served by friars of the Servite Order since c. 1375 and is the headquarters of their General Curia. The cardinal-protector of the church is normally of the order of cardinal priests, currently Giuseppe Betori.

There has been a church dedicated to Pope Marcellus I (d. AD 309) on the site since at least the year 418 when Pope Boniface I was reportedly crowned there. It was rebuilt in its present form in the late 16th and early 17th centuries. It is located near the Piazza Venezia on the Via del Corso, in ancient times called via Lata, which now connects Piazza Venezia to Piazza del Popolo and stands diagonal from the church of Santa Maria in Via Lata and two doors from the Oratory of Santissimo Crocifisso.

== History ==
While the tradition holds that the church was built over the prison of Pope Marcellus I (d. 309), it is known that the Titulus Marcelli was present no later than 418, when Pope Boniface I was elected there. The "Septiformis" litany, commanded by Pope Gregory I in 590, saw the men moving from San Marcello.

Pope Adrian I, in the 8th century, built a church on the same place, which is currently under the modern church. By the 11th century the church was parochial and collegiate, being administered by a college of secular priests. The corpse of Cola di Rienzo was held in the church for three days after his execution in 1354. In 1375, Pope Gregory XI suppressed the secular college and gave the church to friars of the Order of Servants of the Blessed Virgin Mary (Servites) who founded a convent here and continue to manage the church to this day.

On 22 May 1519, a fire destroyed the church. The money collected for its rebuilding was used to bribe the landsknechts, who were pillaging the city during the Sack of Rome (1527). The original plan to rebuild the church was designed by Jacopo Sansovino, who fled the city during the Sack and never returned to finish it. The work was continued by Antonio da Sangallo the Younger, who rebuilt the church, but a Tiber flood damaged it again in 1530. It was only in 1692–1697 that the church was completed with a facade by Carlo Fontana, commissioned by Monsignor Marcantonio Cataldi Boncompagni. The exterior travertine statues were sculpted by Francesco Cavallini, and the stucco bas-relief over the entrance, with depicts San Filippo Benizio, was created by Antonio Raggi. Benizio had been a member of the Servite order.

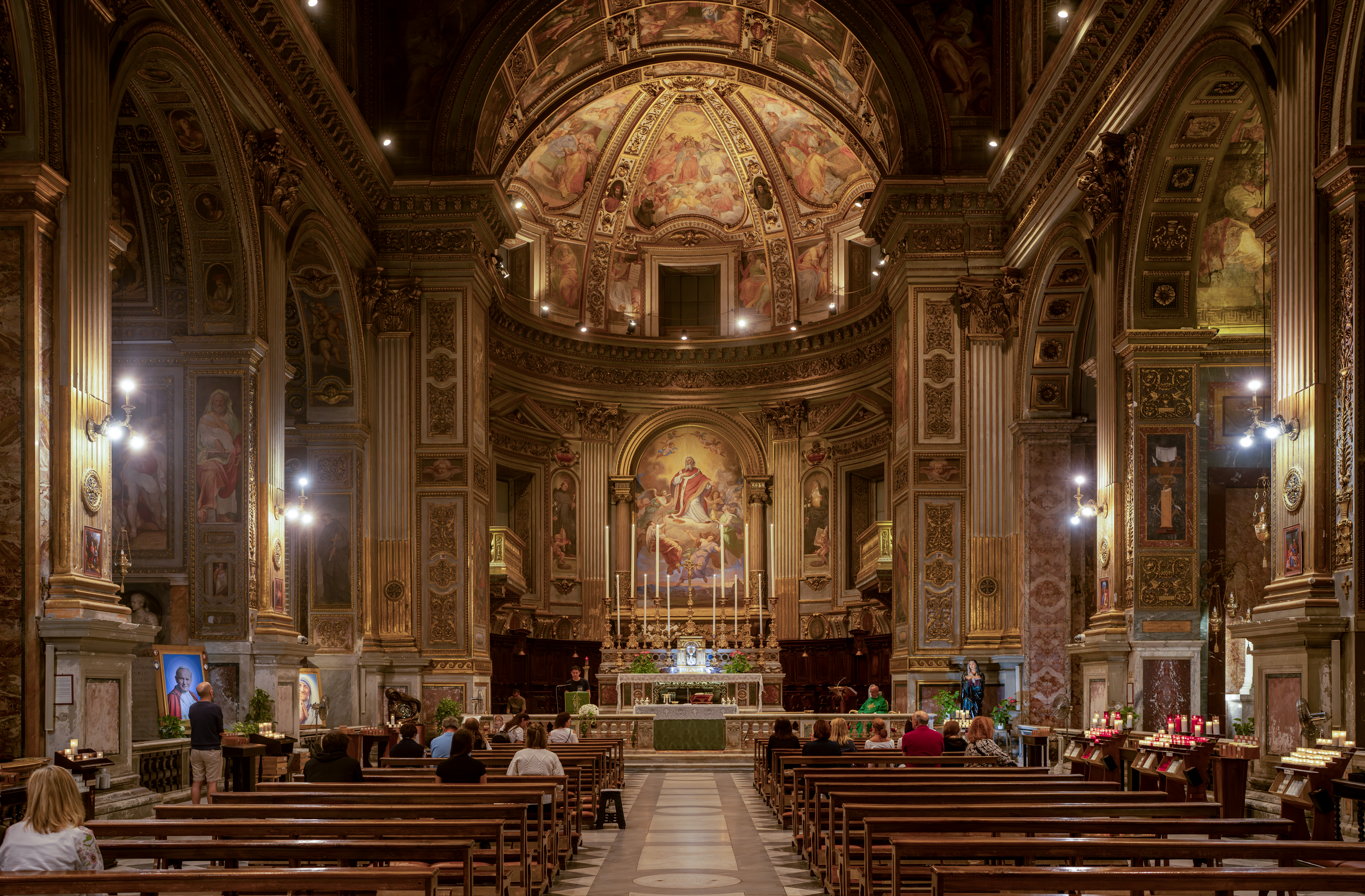
Interior.

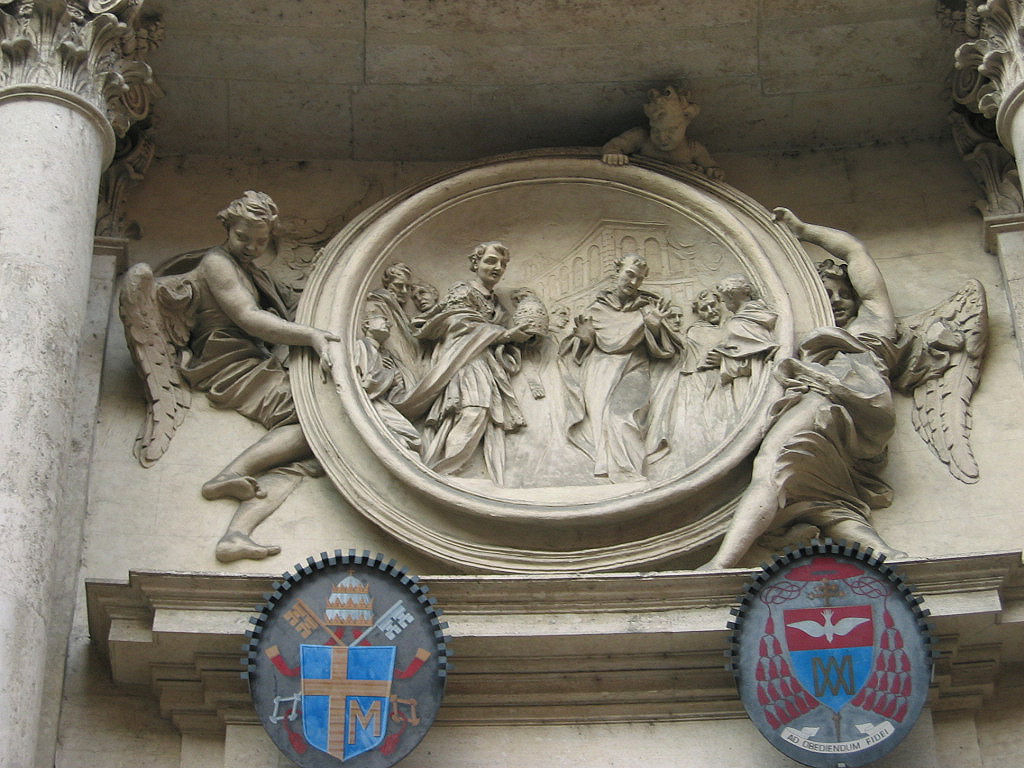
St Philip Benizi refuses the papal tiara, by Raggi, façade of San Marcello.

Under the main altar, decorated with 12th century opus sectile, are the relics of several saints, which include those of Pope Marcellus as well as Digna and Emerita. The last chapel on the left is dedicated to St Philip Benizi. The late-Baroque decoration contains sculptures by Francesco Cavallini and reliefs by Ercole Ferrata and Antonio Raggi. The first chapel on the left has the double tomb of Cardinal Giovanni Michiel and his grandson Antonio Orso sculpted by Jacopo Sansovino.

Behind the facade is a Crucifixion (1613) by Giovanni Battista Ricci. The tomb of Cardinal Cennino was sculpted by Giovanni Francesco de'Rossi (la Vecchietta). Along the right, the first chapel of Marchese Maccarani holds an Annunciation by Lazzaro Baldi; in the second Martyrdom of Sts. Digna and Emerita (1727) of Pietro Barbieri (architecture by Francesco Ferrari); in the third Madonna with the Child, a fresco from the late 14th century, episodes of the life of the Virgin by Francesco Salviati, fresco and paintings of Giovan Battista Ricci; in the fourth chapel a Creation of Eve and the evangelists Mark and John, frescoes by Perino del Vaga, Matthew and Luke begun by Perino del Vaga and finished by Daniele da Volterra. Inside is a cyborium (1691) designed by Carlo Bizzaccheri; in the fifth chapel is a monument to the Cardinal Fabrizio Paolucci (1726) by Pietro Bracci with an altarpiece by Aureliano Milani and lateral paintings by Domenico Corvi; and a monument to cardinal Camillo Paolucci by Tommaso Righi (1776) and wall paintings by Aureliano Milani. On the left nave, in the fifth chapel, is a San Filippo Benizi (1725) by Pier Leone Ghezzi and Gagliardi; in the fourth Conversion of Saint Paul (1560) by Federico Zuccari and his brother Taddeo and, on the sides, of History of Saint Paul. Inside of the chapel has busts of Muzio, Roberto, Lelio Frangipane by Alessandro Algardi (1630–40). In the third chapel on the left is a Madonna Addolorata by Pietro Paolo Naldini, crowned by the Vatican Chapter in 1695. Sacrifice of Isaac and discovery of Moses by Domenico Corvi; in the first, Madonna and seven Saints by Agostino Masucci.

The church is administered and owned by the Servite Order since 1369.

== Cardinal Protectors ==
- Giulio (1144.02.08 – 1158)
- Konrad von Wittelsbach (1163 – 1163)
- Mathieu d'Anjou (1178.12 – 1183)
- Adelardo Cattaneo (1185.03.06 – 1188)
- Fidanzio (1193.02.20 – 1197.02.19)
- Gérard, Cistercians (O. Cist.) (1199 – 1200)
- Pietro Capuano (1200 – 1214.08.30)
- Leone (1221 – 1228?)
- Niccolò Conti di Segni (1228.12 – 1239.12.27)
- Pierre de Bar (1244.05.28 – 1252.02?)
- Guillaume de Vicedominis (1275.06.07 – 1276.09.06 in commendam)
- Giacomo Colonna (1278.04? – 1294 in commendam; pro illa vice Deaconry)
- Nicolas l'Aide (1294.09.18 – 1294.10)
- Arnaud de Canteloup (1305.12.15 – 1313.12.14)
- Bertrand du Pouget (1316.12.17 – 1327.12.18)
- Androin de la Roche, Benedictine Congregation of Cluny (O.S.B. Clun.) (1361.09.17 – 1369.10.29)
- Jean Lefèvre (1371.05.30 – 1372.03.06)
- Jean de la Grange, O.S.B. Clun. (1375.12.20 – 1394)
- Bartolomeo Mezzavacca (1378.09.18 – 1383.10.15)
- Antonio Casini (1426.05.27 – 1439.02.04)
- Niccolò d'Acciapaccio (1440.01.08 – 1447.04.03)
- Bartolomeo Roverella (1462.01.26 – 1476.05.02)
- Giovanni Michiel (1484 – 1491.03.14)
- Pedro Luis de Borja Lanzol de Romaní, Equestrian Order of the Holy Sepulchre of Jerusalem (O.E.S.S.H.) (1503.12.07 – 1511.10.04)
- Francisco de Remolins (1511.10.27 – 1517.03.16)
- Enrique Cardona y Enríquez (1527.11.24 – 1530.02.07)
- Egidio di Viterbo, Augustinians (O.E.S.A.) (1530.05.09 – 1532.11.12)
- Dionisio Neagrus Laurerio, Servites (O.S.M.) (1540.01.28 – 1542.09.17)
- Marcello Crescenzi (1542.11.06 – 1552.05.28)
- Miguel da Silva (1552.06.27 – 1553.11.29)
- Girolamo Verallo (1553.11.29 – 1555.10.10)
- Girolamo Dandini (1555.10.25 – 1559.12.04)
- Giovanni Andrea Mercurio (1560.01.19 – 1561.02.02)
- Marco Antonio Amulio (1561.03.10 – 1561.03.17 pro illa vice Deaconry, 1561.03.17 – 1572.03.17)
- Marcantonio Bobba (1572.06.02 – 1575.03.18)
- Giambattista Castagna (later Pope Urban VII) (1584.01.09 – 1590.09.15)
- Benedetto Giustiniani (1591.01.07 – 1599.03.17)
- Paolo Emilio Zacchia (1599.03.17 – 1605.05.31)
- Innocenzo del Bufalo-Cancellieri (1605.06.01 – 1606.01.30)
- François d'Escoubleau de Sourdis (1606.01.30 – 1621.03.29)
- Francesco Cennini de' Salamandri (1621.04.19 – 1641.02.25)
- Pierdonato Cesi (iuniore) (1642.02.10 – 1656.01.30)
- Camillo Melzi (1657.04.23 – 1659.01.21)
- Giovanni Battista Spada (1659.01.27 – 1673.09.25)
- Federico Baldeschi Colonna (1675.01.28 – 1685.04.09)
- Pier Matteo Petrucci, Oratorians (C.O.) (1687.06.09 – 1701.07.05)
- Gianalberto Badoaro (1706.06.25 – 1712.07.11)
- Luigi Priuli (1712.07.11 – 1714.05.28)
- Wolfgang Hannibal von Schrattenbach (1714.12.07 – 1738.07.22)
- Raffaele Cosimo de' Girolami (1743.09.23 – 1748.02.21)
- Mario Millini (1748.04.01 – 1756.07.25)
- Antonio Maria Erba-Odescalchi (1759.11.19 – 1762.03.28)
- Ludovico Merlini (1762.04.19 – 1762.11.12)
- Giuseppe Simonetti (1766.12.01 – 1767.01.04)
- Carlo Francesco Caselli, Servites (O.S.M.) (1802.09.20 – 1828.04.20)
- Thomas Weld (1830.07.05 – 1837.04.10)
- Chiarissimo Falconieri Mellini (1838.02.15 – 1859.08.22)
- Mariano Falcinelli Antoniacci, Cassinese Benedictine Congregation O.S.B. Cas. (1874.05.04 – 1874.05.29)
- Salvatore Nobili Vitelleschi (1875.09.23 – 1875.10.17)
- Luigi Di Canossa (1877.03.20 – 1900.03.12)
- Casimiro Gennari (1901.04.18 – 1914.01.31)
- Franziskus von Bettinger (1914.05.28 – 1917.04.12)
- Francesco Ragonesi (7 March 1921 - 14 Sep 1931)
- Maurilio Fossati, Oblates of Saints Charles and Gaudentius of Novara (O.Ss.G.C.N. ) (13 March 1933 - 30 March 1965)
- Carlo Grano (26 June 1967 - 2 April 1976)
- Dominic Ekandem (24 May 1976 - 24 Nov 1995)
- Edouard Gagnon, Sulpicians (P.S.S.) (29 Jan 1996 - 25 Aug 2007)
- Agustín García-Gasco Vicente (24 Nov 2007 - 1 May 2011)
- Giuseppe Betori (18 Feb 2012 - ... )

== See also ==
- Oratory of Santissimo Crocifisso

== Sources ==
- "San Marcello al Corso", Chris Nyborg.
- Titi, Filippo (1763). Descrizione delle Pitture, Sculture e Architetture esposte in Roma. Marco Pagliarini, Rome. pp. 321–324. "Fillipo Titi."

== Bibliography ==
- Darko Senekovic, S. Marcello al Corso, in: D. Mondini, C. Jäggi, P. C. Claussen, Die Kirchen der Stadt Rom im Mittelalter 1050-1300, Band 4 (M-O), Stuttgart 2020, pp. 30–46 (German).
