= Giovanni di San Paolo =

Benedictine monk

Giovanni di San Paolo (died c. early 1215) was a Benedictine monk at San Paolo fuori le Mura in Rome. He was made cardinal deacon on 20 February 1193, then cardinal priest of Santa Prisca in May 1193 and finally cardinal bishop of Sabina at the end of 1204 (subscribed as bishop for the first time on 9 January 1205). He is often referred to as a member of the powerful Roman Colonna family, but modern scholars have established that this is based on a lie from the beginning of 16th century. More likely he was nephew of Celestine III and member of the Bobone family. He studied medicine at Amalfi.

== Biography ==
Giovanni ("John" in English) rose to influence in the curia during the pontificate of Celestine III. According to Roger of Hoveden, he was nominated by Celestine III to succeed him in 1198, but appears to have received the cardinal priesthood of Santa Prisca as a consolation prize from Celestine's successor Innocent III; however, since he was actually appointed to that rank in 1193, this story seems to be inaccurate. Innocent employed him on many legatine missions to Germany, Spain, Sicily, and France. He was also grand penitentiary.

In 1200, he was in France with Cardinal Octavian to deal with Philip Augustus' divorce. From there, Innocent sent him into Languedoc to act as papal legate to work for the suppression of Catharism. He delivered a revised version of the decretal Vergentis in senium, first issued by Innocent in March 1199 for Viterbo in the Papal States. The Languedocian version of the decretal was considerably less harsh, omitting a clause calling for the dispossession of the Catholic heirs of heretics. It was probably for his work in Languedoc that he was elevated to the suburbicarian bishopric of Sabina in 1204.

He was the powerful friend of Francis of Assisi and was instrumental in obtaining papal approval of the Franciscan Rule.

He died at Rome. He is remembered at Amalfi for his munificence in building and endowing a spacious hospital there.

== Sources ==
- Graham-Leigh, Elaine. The Southern French Nobility and the Albigensian Crusade. Woodbridge: The Boydell Press, 2005. ISBN 1-84383-129-5
- Salvador Miranda: biographical entry of Cardinal Giovanni di San Paolo
