= Pierre de Bar =

French Cardinal

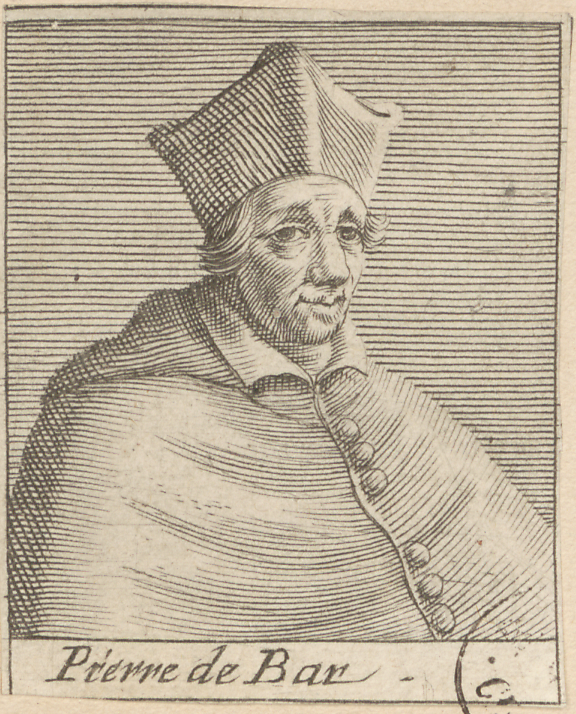
Pierre de Bar

Pierre de Bar (died 11 January 1253, Perugia) was a French Cardinal. He is also tentatively identified as a scholastic philosopher, at the University of Paris around 1230. Some sources indicate that he entered Cistercian Order but more recent research conclude that he was secular priest. He was chancellor of the diocese of Noyon from 1232 until his promotion to the cardinalate.

Pierre was created cardinal by Pope Innocent IV, initially as priest of S. Marcello on 28 May 1244. He subscribed papal bulls between 27 September 1244 and 12 June 1252. As a cardinal, Pierre participated in the Council of Lyons in 1245, acted as a papal legate to Spain. His election to the see of Noyon in 1250 was not ratified by Innocent IV. Pierre was named cardinal-bishop of St. Sabina shortly before his death in 1252.

There is a portrait of him with Mary Magdalen, by Giotto, in the basilica of San Francesco d'Assisi.

== Bibliography ==
- Agostino Paravicini Bagliani, Cardinali di curia e "familiae" cardinalizie dal 1227 al 1254, Padova 1972, pp. 213–220
- Young, Spencer E. (2014). Scholarly Community at the Early University of Paris: Theologians, Education and Society, 1215-1248. Cambridge University Press.
