= Niccolò Scolari =

Italian cardinal (died 1200)

Niccolo Scolari (died 1200) was an Italian cardinal.

He was cardinal-nephew of Pope Clement III, his uncle, who elevated him in September 1190. In older historiography, he is erroneously listed as Niccolo Boboni and nephew of Pope Celestine III. He subscribed papal bulls as S.R.E. diaconus cardinalis between 23 October and 19 December 1190, as cardinal-deacon of Santa Lucia in Orthea on 17 February 1191, and finally as cardinal-deacon of Santa Maria in Cosmedin between 15 May 1191 and 4 August 1200. He died before 23 December 1200.
