= Adelardo Cattaneo =

Italian cardinal and bishop

Adelardo Cattaneo (died 24 August 1225) was an Italian cardinal and bishop. His first name is also listed as Alardo.

He was canon of the cathedral chapter of Verona. Pope Lucius III created him Cardinal-Priest of S. Marcello in the consistory of 6 March 1185 (or in December 1183, or in 1184). As such, he countersigned the papal bulls issued between 20 April 1185 and 28 October 1188. He participated in the papal elections of 1185 and October 1187, and possibly also in that of December 1187 and 1191. In the pontificate of Pope Clement III, he served as papal legate in the Holy Land.

Towards the end of 1188, he was elected bishop of Verona; he was confirmed by Clement III and took possession of the see in the following year (1189). At that time, he resigned his titular church of S. Marcello, but retained his cardinalate and signed the documents as "Cardinal-Priest of the Holy Roman Church, humble bishop of Verona".

He died on 24 August 1225, after his successor was elected. He was the Last Cardinal created by Pope Lucius III.

== Bibliography ==
- Werner Maleczek, Papst und Kardinalskolleg von 1191 bis 1216, Wien 1984, p. 68
- Gaetano Moroni. Dizionario di erudizione storico-ecclesiastica da S. Pietro sino ai nostri giorni. Venice : Tipografia Emiliana, 1840–1861, vol. X, p. 262
- Konrad Eubel, Hierarchia Catholica Medii Aevi, volumen I, 1913, p. 3, 5 and 522
