= Conrad of Wittelsbach =

Archbishop of Mainz (d. 1200)

- Archbishop of Mainz
- Church: Catholic Church
- Diocese: Electorate of Mainz
- In office: 1161–1165, 1183−1200

Personal details
- Born: c. 1120/1125
- Died: 25 October 1200

Conrad of Wittelsbach (c. 1120/1125 – 25 October 1200) was the Archbishop of Mainz (as Conrad I) and Archchancellor of Germany from 20 June 1161 to 1165 and again from 1183 to his death. He was also a cardinal of the Roman Catholic Church.

The son of Otto IV, Count of Wittelsbach, and brother of Otto I of Bavaria, he studied in Salzburg and Paris. At the Council of Lodi in 1161, Frederick Barbarossa appointed him archbishop of Mainz to end a schism between Rudolf of Zähringen and Christian von Buch in that see. At that same council, Barbarossa appointed Victor IV antipope in opposition to Pope Alexander III. After Victor's death in 1164, Rainald of Dassel, the archbishop of Cologne, chose as antipope Paschal III at Lucca. Conrad refused to support the new antipope and consequently fell out with Barbarossa. He fled to France and then Rome in 1165 and his see was bestowed on Christian von Buch, though Alexander III still recognised him as legal archbishop. On 18 December, the pope made him cardinal priest of San Marcello al Corso and then cardinal bishop of Sabina. The pope later created him bishop of Sora in Campania. Conrad fled before Christian took Rome with an imperial army.

By the Treaty of Venice of 1177, the pope was constrained to recognise Christian as the legitimate archbishop of Mainz, but Conrad was compensated with the archdiocese of Salzburg (as Conrad III). Conrad never, however, ceased to regard himself as anything but the rightful archbishop of Mainz. When Christian died in 1183, Conrad could again assume his archiepiscopal responsibilities in that city, which, in 1160, had been deprived by the emperor of its charter for the murder of the archbishop Arnold of Selenhofen. The fortifications had then been levelled, but Conrad rebuilt them and renovated Mainz Cathedral. The Diet of Pentecost 1184 on the Maarau, called the "largest feast of the Middle Ages", also fell under his aegis.

In April or May 1187, at the Diet of Gelnhausen, Conrad convinced his fellow bishops to support the emperor's cause against Rome. In March 1188, a Court of Christ was held in Mainz at which the Third Crusade was announced. Conrad led an army on Crusade in 1197, the same year the Emperor Henry VI died. He left his lands on 17 April 1197.

Conrad, with the other imperial princes, had elected his infant son Frederick king in 1196. While Conrad was in the Holy Land acting as legate for Pope Celestine III, he intervened in the princely succession of Antioch. He tried to get Raymond-Roupen recognised as the successor of Bohemond III instead of Bohemond IV. On 6 January 1198 (or 1199) Conrad was present at the coronation of Leo I, King of Armenia and maybe performed the coronation himself. Later, he returned equipped with new legatine power by Pope Innocent III. He succeeded in establishing an armistice in April 1200 between the competing factions in Germany, namely the Hohenstaufen and the Welf.

As Cardinal-Bishop of Sabina, he signed the papal bulls issued between 18 March 1166 and 6 November 1199. After the election to the papacy of Cardinal Ubaldo Allucingoli (Pope Lucius III) in 1181 he became new dean of the Sacred College of Cardinals.

He was returning from the Kingdom of Hungary in early October back to Mainz, after reconciling the two brothers, Emeric of Hungary and Andrew II of Hungary over their political rivalry, when he died on the way from Nuremberg to Würzburg in Rietfeld or Riedfeld near Neustadt on the Aisch, in what was then Hungary. He was buried in the cathedral he had expanded.

== Bibliography ==
- Brixius, Johannes M. (1912). Die Mitglieder des Kardinalkollegiums von 1130-1181. Berlin.
- Ganzer, Klaus (1963). Die Entwicklung des auswärtigen Kardinalats im hohen Mittelater. Tübingen.
- Juritsch, Georg (1894). Geschichte der Babenberger und ihrer Länder, 976-1246. Innsbruck: Wagnerschen Universitätsbuchhandlung.

Catholic Church titles
Preceded by Christian I	Archbishop of Mainz; 1161–1165	Succeeded by Christian I
Preceded by Christian I	Archbishop of Mainz; 1183–1200	Succeeded by Siegfried II
