= Roger (archbishop of Benevento) =

Italian cleric

Roger of San Severino (died December 1221) was the Archbishop of Benevento from 1179 until his death. He was probably a younger brother of Count William of San Severino, the most powerful lord in the Cilento and a royal justiciar. He may also have been a cousin of Count Robert of Caserta. He was a monk at Montecassino before becoming bishop at a young age. His high aristocratic lineage and monastic vows were both unusual for bishops of southern Italy at the time. He was appointed archbishop of Benevento and cardinal-priest of Sant'Eusebio by Pope Alexander III.

In June 1180 Roger and five of his twenty-two suffragans and two other bishops visited Montecassino, where they issued an indulgence for one year's penance to visitors of the abbey and one year and forty days' penance to visitors on Saint Benedict's day. In 1182, when Roger dedicated the abbey church of Montevergine, he was accompanied by nine of his suffragans.

In 1199 Roger's own canons brought charges against him before Pope Innocent III, who sent a cardinal and the archbishop of Naples to investigate. Among the charges was that Roger had encouraged the citizens of Benevento to destroy the castle (castellum) of a neighbouring baron with whom they were in dispute. Therefore, the canons alleged, Roger was "a participant in, and master of, civil war".

== See also ==
- Catholic Church in Italy
