= Pope Celestine III =

Head of the Catholic Church from 1191 to 1198

- Bishop of Rome
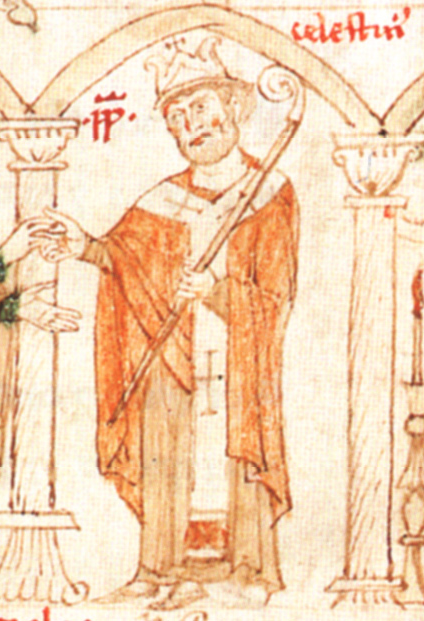
- Pope Celestine III, from the Liber ad honorem Augusti (1196)
- Church: Catholic Church
- Papacy began: 30 March 1191
- Papacy ended: 8 January 1198
- Predecessor: Clement III
- Successor: Innocent III
- Previous post: Cardinal-Deacon of Santa Maria in Cosmedin (1144–1191)

Orders
- Ordination: 13 April 1191
- Consecration: 14 April 1191 by Ottaviano di Paoli
- Created cardinal: February 1144 by Celestine II

Personal details
- Born: Giacinto Bobone c. 1105 Rome, Papal States
- Died: 8 January 1198 (aged 92–93) Rome, Papal States
- Motto: Perfice gressus meos in semitis tuis ("Going in Thy path")
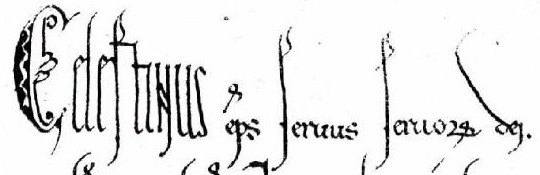
- Signature: Celestine III's signature

- Coat of arms: Celestine III's coat of arms

Ordination history of Pope Celestine III
History
Episcopal consecration
- Principal consecrator: Ottaviano di Paoli
- Co-consecrators: Unknown
- Date: 14 April 1191
- Place: Rome, Papal States
Cardinalate
- Elevated by: Pope Celestine II
- Date: February 1144
Episcopal succession
Bishops consecrated by Pope Celestine III as principal consecrator
- Martín López de Pisuerga: 6 June 1192
- Martinho Pires: 1189
- Philip of Poictou: 20 April 1197

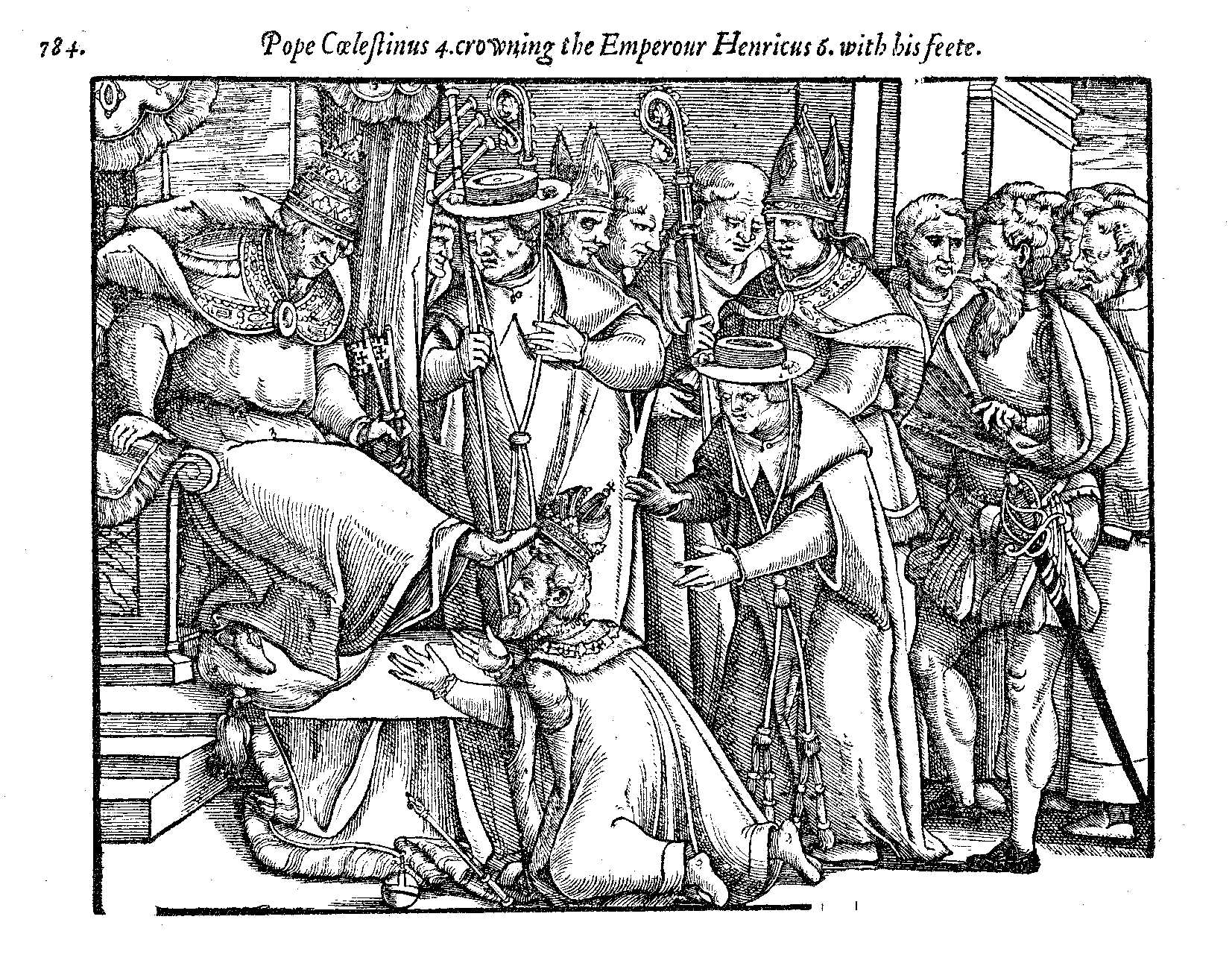
Satirical cartoon of Celestine III crowning Emperor Henry VI with his feet. (This image refers to him as "Coelestinus 4," as the author considered Teobaldo Boccapecci as Pope Celestine II.)

Pope Celestine III (Latin: Caelestinus III; c. 1105 – 8 January 1198), born Giacinto Bobone, was the head of the Catholic Church and ruler of the Papal States from 30 March or 10 April 1191 to his death in 1198. He had a tense relationship with several monarchs, including Emperor Henry VI, King Tancred of Sicily, and King Alfonso IX of León.

== Early career ==
Giacinto Bobone was born into the noble Orsini family in Rome. He was appointed as cardinal-deacon in 1144 by Celestine II or Lucius II. Considered by the Roman Curia as an expert on Spain, Bobone conducted two legatine missions to Spain in (1154–55) and (1172–75) as the Cardinal-Deacon of Santa Maria in Cosmedin.

== Pontificate ==
Celestine was elected on 29/30 March 1191 and ordained a priest 13 April 1191. He crowned Emperor Henry VI a day or two after his ordination. In 1192, Celestine recognized Tancred as king of Sicily, despite Henry VI's wife's claim. He threatened to excommunicate Henry VI for wrongfully keeping King Richard I of England imprisoned, but he could do little else since the college of cardinals were against it. He placed Pisa under an interdict, which was lifted by his successor, Innocent III in 1198.

Celestine, in 1192, sent a cardinal-priest of St. Lorenzo, Cinthius, to Denmark to address the discord between the Danish princes. Upon Cinthius' return to Rome, Celestine issued three papal bulls;Cum Romana ecclesia, Etsi sedes debeat, Quanto magnitudinem tuam. These bulls advised the archbishop Absalon of Lund to instruct the King of Denmark to release the bishop of Schleswig. The bulls also threatened to excommunicate the offending Duke Valdemar, who had imprisoned the bishop of Schleswig, and place the kingdom of Denmark under interdict. The bishop would stay imprisoned until Pope Innocent III restarted the process in 1203.

Celestine condemned King Alfonso IX of León for his marriage to Theresa of Portugal on the grounds of consanguinity. Portugal and León were placed under interdict. Then, in 1196, he excommunicated Alfonso IX for allying with the Almohad Caliphate while making war on Castile. Following his marriage with Berengaria of Castile, Celestine excommunicated Alfonso and placed an interdict over León.

In December 1196, Celestine issued a bull acknowledging the possessions of the Teutonic Knights.

== Death ==
Celestine would have resigned the papacy and recommended a successor (Cardinal Giovanni di San Paolo, O.S.B.) shortly before his death, but was not allowed to do so by the cardinals.

== See also ==
- List of popes
- Cardinals created by Celestine III

== Sources ==
- Clarke, Peter D. (2007). The Interdict in the Thirteenth Century: A question of collective guilt. Oxford University Press.
- Cross, F.L., ed. (1997). "Celestine III". The Oxford Dictionary of the Christian Church. Oxford University Press.
- Duggan, Anne J. (2016). "Hyacinth Bobone: Diplomat and Pope". In Doran, John; Smith, Damian J. (eds.). Pope Celestine III (1191-1198): Diplomat and Pastor. Routledge. pp. 1–30.
- Edbury, Peter W. (2016). "Celestine III, the Crusade and the Latin East". In Doran, John; Smith, Damian J. (eds.). Pope Celestine III (1191-1198): Diplomat and Pastor. Routledge. pp. 129–144.
- Lay, Stephen (2009). The Reconquest Kings of Portugal: Political and Cultural Reorientation on the Medieval Frontier. Palgrave Macmillan.
- Lower, Michael (2014). "The Papacy and Christian Mercenaries of Thirteenth-Century North Africa". Speculum. 89 (3 JULY). The University of Chicago Press: 601–631. doi:10.1017/S0038713414000761. S2CID 154773840.
- Moore, John Clare (2003). Pope Innocent III (1160/61–1216): To root up and to plant. BRILL.
- Nielsen, Torben K. (2016). "Celestine III and the North". In Doran, John; Smith, Damian J. (eds.). Pope Celestine III (1191-1198): Diplomat and Pastor. Routledge. pp. 159–178.
- Poole, Austin Lane (1926). "The Emperor Henry VI". In Tanner, J.R.; Previte-Orton, C.W.; Brooke, Z.N. (eds.). The Cambridge Medieval History. Vol. V: Contest of empire and papacy. Cambridge at the University Press.
- Robinson, I.S. (1990). The Papacy, 1073-1198: Continuity and Innovation. Cambridge University Press.
- Robinson, I.S. (2004). "The institutions of the church, 1073-1216". In Luscombe, David; Riley-Smith, Jonathan (eds.). The New Cambridge Medieval History. Vol. IV: c.1024-c.1198, Part 1. Cambridge University Press.
- Robinson, I.S. (2006). "The papacy". In Luscombe, David; Riley-Smith, Jonathan (eds.). The New Cambridge Medieval History. Vol. IV: c.1024-c.1198, Part II. Cambridge University Press. pp. 317–384.

Catholic Church titles
Preceded by Clement III	Pope; 1191–98	Succeeded by Innocent III
