= Treaties of the Holy See =

A treaty of the Holy See is called a Concordat. This is a list.

== 11th century ==
- Treaty of Melfi (1059; Normans)
- Treaty of Ceprano (1080) (Normans)

== 12th century ==
- Concordat of Worms (1122; Holy Roman Empire)
- Treaty of Mignano (1139)
- Treaty of Constance (1153) (Holy Roman Empire)
- Treaty of Benevento (1156; Sicily)
- Treaty of Venice (1177; Holy Roman Empire, Lombard League)

== 13th century ==
- Treaty of Speyer (1209) (Holy Roman Empire)
- Treaty of Ceprano (1230) (Holy Roman Empire)
- Treaty of San Germano (1230; Holy Roman Empire)
- Concordat of the Forty Articles (1289; Portugal)
- Treaty of Tarascon (1291; Aragon, France, Naples)
- Treaty of Anagni (1295; Aragon, France, Naples, and Majorca)

== 15th century ==
- Fürsten Konkordat between Pope Eugenius IV and the Princes Electors of the Holy Roman Empire (Jan 1447)
- Concordat of Vienna (1448; Holy Roman Empire)
- Treaty of Bagnolo (1489; Ferrara, Venice)

== 16th century ==
- Concordat of Bologna (1516; France)
- Treaty of London (1518) (France, England, Holy Roman Empire, Spain, Burgundy, and the Netherlands)

== 18th century ==
- Treaty of Tolentino (1797; France)

== 19th century ==
- Concordat of 1801 (France)
- Concordat of 11 June 1817 (France)
- Concordat of 24 October 1817 (Bavaria)
- Concordat of 16 February 1818 (Naples)
- 1847 Agreement between the Holy See and Russia
- Concordat of 1851 (Spain)
- Concordat of 1854 (Guatemala)
- Concordat of 1887 (Colombia)

== 20th century ==
- Concordat of 1922 (Latvia)
- Concordat of 1925 (Poland)
- Concordat of 1928 (Colombia)
- Lateran Treaty (1929; Italy)
- Prussian Concordat (1929)
- Concordat of 1933 (1933; Austria)
- Reichskonkordat (1933; Germany)
- Concordat of 1940 (Portugal)
- Concordat of 1953 (Spain)
- Concordat of 1993 (Poland)
- Treaties between the Republic of Croatia and the Holy See (1996-1998)

== 21st century ==
- Concordat of 2004 (Portugal)
- Treaty of 2004 (Slovakia)
- Concordat of 2008 (Brazil)
- Concordat of 2009 (Schleswig-Holstein)
- Agreement of 2019 (Burkina Faso)
- Treaty of 2024 (Czech Republic)

== See also ==
- Padroado
- Patronato real
