= Holy See–Portugal relations =

- Holy See: Portugal

Relations between the Holy See and Portugal date back to 1179.

== History ==
Relations between the Holy See and Portugal date back to 1179. On 23 May, Pope Alexander III issued the papal bull Manifestis Probatum, which officially recognized the independence of Portugal from the Kingdom of León.

=== Concordat of the Forty Articles ===
The Concordat of the Forty Articles (Portuguese: Concordata dos Quarenta Artigos) was an agreement reached in 1289 between the Kingdom of Portugal and the Holy See. Signed by King Denis and Pope Nicholas IV, it ended a conflict between the Portuguese monarchy and the Papacy that had begun in 1267 under Denis's father, Afonso III. The dispute had led to the excommunication of both kings.

=== Age of discovery ===
During the age of discovery, the Holy See became increasingly involved in matters involving the Catholic monarchies of Europe, including Portugal, as they maneuvered to establish transatlantic and transpacific trade routes.

Beginning in the 1450s, Catholic missions were administered through patronage rights. Pope Nicholas V gave the kings of Portugal the right of patronage (jus patronatus) over land which had already been acquired and to any that might be so in the future.

Portugal and Castilian Spain scrambled for new territory. The Holy See sanctioned the 1494 Treaty of Tordesillas between them, granting most of Asia to Portugal's patronage (padroado).

=== Concordat of 1940 ===
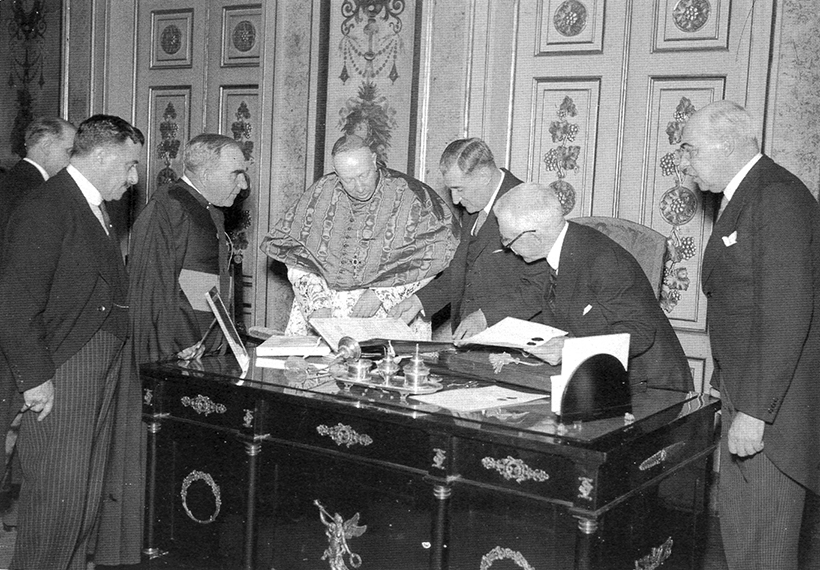
Salazar, Prime Minister of Portugal, and the Apostolic Nuncio, Cardinal Pietro Ciriaci, during the ratification of the Concordat on 1 June 1940, in Necessidades Palace, Lisbon.

The Concordat of 1940 was an agreement between Portugal and the Holy See of the Catholic Church signed in the Vatican on 7 May 1940 under António de Oliveira Salazar's Estado Novo. The 1940 concordat was kept in place until 2004 when a new one was signed by Prime Minister José Manuel Barroso. Salazar's text outlived him and outlived his regime for 30 years. The text was re-ratified in 1975, after the Carnation Revolution, only slightly amended in order to allow civil divorce in Catholic marriages, while keeping all the other articles in force.

In May 1940 a Concordat between the Portuguese state and the Vatican was signed. There were difficulties in the negotiations which preceded the signing of the Concordat, demonstrating both how eager the Church remained to re-establish its influence, and how equally determined Salazar was to prevent any religious intervention within the political sphere, which he saw as the exclusive preserve of the State. The legislation of the parliamentary republic was not fundamentally altered: religious teaching in schools remained voluntary, while civil marriages and civil divorce were retained and religious oaths were not reestablished. The Bishops were to be appointed by the Holy See but final nomination required the government's approval. (Note: Regal control over ecclesiastical appointments was part of the "Padroado Real", that is, the exclusive royal prerogative granted by the Pope to the Portuguese crown to evangelize in the Far East and elsewhere.” Thus the veto right in this concordat is a nod to the privilege of Iberian kings and served to legitimize Salazar's regime.) The clergy were subject to military service but in the form of pastoral care to the armed forces and, in time of war, also to the medical units. The Church could establish and maintain private schools, but they would be subject to state supervision. The Catholic religion and morality were to be taught in public schools unless parents had requested the contrary. However, Catholics who celebrated canonical marriages were not allowed to obtain a civil divorce. The law said that "It is understood that by the very fact of the celebration of a canonical marriage, the spouses renounce the legal right to ask for a divorce." Despite this prohibition, by 1960 nearly 91 percent of all marriages in the country were canonical marriages.

One immediate result of the concordat was that on June 13, 1940, Pope Pius XII issued the encyclical Saeculo exeunte, which appealed to Portuguese national feelings.

=== Concordat of 2004 ===
The Concordat of 2004 is an agreement between Portugal and the Holy See of the Roman Catholic Church. The concordat was signed on 18 May 2004 by Angelo Sodano, Cardinal Secretary of State, for the Holy See and José Manuel Durão Barroso, Prime Minister of Portugal, for the Portuguese Republic. It has 33 articles, and supersedes the Concordat of 1940, renewing the relations between the Catholic Church and Portugal, redefining the status of this religion in Portugal. Its articles refer to aspects like religious holidays, religious marriage, organization of the Church, fiscal rights, freedom of religion, annulments, and Catholic education.

== See also ==
- Catholic Church in Portugal
