= Concordats with individual states of Germany =

Concordats between the Holy See and individual German states were concluded both before and after the Unification of Germany in the 1870s.

== Pre-Unification ==
Early examples include:

- Bavaria in 1817
- Prussia in 1821
- Würtemberg, Baden, Hesse(-Darmstadt), Nassau, Free City of Frankfurt, Saxony, Oldenburg, Waldeck-Pyrmont, Bremen and Lübeck (multilateral) in 1821 and in 1827
- Oldenburg in 1830
- Hanover in 1834

== Post-Unification ==
In addition to the Reichskonkordat at the federal level, there are concordats between the Holy See and thirteen German states (Länder). This is because the individual states of the German federation have competencies in legislation with respect to education, culture and, to some extent, finance.

In 1929 Prussia and the Holy See signed the Prussian Concordat (German: Preußenkonkordat), which remains still valid for formerly Prussian territory within some of its successor states. Baden signed its concordat in 1932. The Reichskonkordat, later affirmed as valid by West Germany in 1957, applied some features of Baden's concordat to Hesse, Württemberg and the Diocese of Meissen, which then comprised all of Saxony and parts of Thuringia.

Other German states with concordats are Baden-Württemberg (1932), Bavaria (1817–1924), Brandenburg (2003), Bremen (2003), Hamburg (2005), Lower Saxony (1965-1973-1989-1993), Mecklenburg-Vorpommern (1997), North Rhine-Westphalia (1929-1956-1984), Rhineland-Palatinate (1929-1969-1973), Saarland (1929-1975-1985), Saxony (1996), Saxony-Anhalt (1998), Schleswig-Holstein (2009) and Thuringia (1997). Three states, Berlin (1970), Hesse (1963–1974), and Rhineland-Palatinate (1975), have agreements with Catholic bishoprics.

There have been three separate waves of concordats. The last one was set off by the dissolution of East Germany, when its five German states that had exited before World War II were reconstituted, joined the Federal Republic of Germany, and entered agreements with the Holy See. Since then three of the northernmost German states, which have small Catholic minorities, have also concluded concordats.

Some of the educational provisions of the Bavarian concordat have aroused controversy. In 2008, the Catholic Church's veto of an academically well-regarded nominee for president of Germany's only Catholic University sparked protests. This veto was permitted by Article 5 of the Bavarian concordat. Another part of the same concordat, Article 3 on "concordat chairs", was unsuccessfully challenged in court in 2009. This provision establishes Church-controlled professorships in theology, philosophy, pedagogy, and the social sciences at state universities.
