= Vatican agreements =

Vatican agreements may refer to:

- Concordat
- Treaties between the Republic of Croatia and the Holy See
