= Treaty of Ceprano =

Treaty of Ceprano may refer to:

- Treaty of Ceprano (1080), Pope Gregory VII established an alliance with Robert Guiscard and recognizes his conquests
- Treaty of Ceprano (1230), established lines of reconciliation between Pope Gregory IX and Holy Roman Emperor Frederick II
