= Pietro di Miso =

Catholic cardinal (died 1174)

Pietro di Miso (died 17 September 1174) was an Italian cardinal. He was elevated to the cardinalate by Pope Adrian IV in the consistory of February 1158. Initially, he was cardinal-deacon of S. Eustachio, but in 1166, he was promoted to the order of cardinal-priests and received titulus San Lorenzo in Damaso. After the double papal election in 1159, he supported the obedience of Pope Alexander III and served as his legate in Hungary. He concluded a concordat with Géza II of Hungary in 1161. He signed the papal bulls between 24 April 1158 and 17 July 1174.

== Bibliography ==
- Philipp Jaffé, Regesta pontificum Romanorum ab condita Ecclesia ad annum post Christum natum MCXCVIII, Berlin 1851
- Gaetano Moroni: Dizionario di erudizione storico-ecclesiastica da S. Pietro sino ai nostri giorni. Vol. XLV, Tipografia Emiliana, Venezia, 1840 - 1861 (page 216)
