= Concordat of 1929 =

Concordat of 1929 may refer to:

- Lateran Treaty, between the Holy See and the Kingdom of Italy
- Prussian Concordat, between the Holy See and the Free State of Prussia
