= Concordat of 11 June 1817 =

Concordat with France

The Concordat of 11 June 1817 was a concordat between the kingdom of France and the Holy See, signed on 11 June 1817. Not having been enacted into law by the French parlement, it never came into force in France. The country remained under the regime outlined in the Concordat of 1801 until the 1905 law on the Separation of the Churches and the State was enacted.

== Representatives ==
Representing Pope Pius VII was Cardinal Ercole Consalvi, the papal secretary of state. He had already negotiated the 1801 Concordat, and was designated the plenipotentiary for the 1817 negotiations. King Louis XVIII chose his favorite, the ambassador to Rome, the Comte de Blacas, who had previously served as the prime minister of France, to negotiate the Concordat of 1817.

== Text ==
The Concordat's introduction (1st article) was a repetition of that of the Concordat of Bologna, but the other articles laid down restrictions on this "re-establishment" of the Concordat of Bologna.

== A revised ecclesiastical geography ==
One of the accord's objectives was to increase the number of dioceses in France. Another important article (article 4) stipulated that the dioceses in the kingdom of France suppressed by the bull of the Holy See of 29 November 1801 were to be re-established in such a number as both sides would agree on as the most advantageous for the good of religion.

Organisation of dioceses envisaged by the French Concordat of 1817
Ecclesiastical provinces (*)	Dioceses (**)	Territory
Aix, with the title of Embrun	Aix-en-Provence	Bouches-du-Rhône (Arrondissement of Aix-en-Provence)
Aix, with the title of Embrun	Digne	Basses-Alpes
Aix, with the title of Embrun	**Fréjus**	Var
Aix, with the title of Embrun	**Gap**	Hautes-Alpes
**Albi**	**Albi**	Tarn (arrondissements of Albi and of Gaillac)
**Albi**	Cahors	Lot
**Albi**	**Castres**	Tarn (arrondissements of Castres and of Lavaur)
**Albi**	Mende	Lozère
**Albi**	**Rodez**	Aveyron
**Arles**	Ajaccio	Corsica
**Arles**	**Arles**	Bouches-du-Rhône (arrondissement of Arles)
**Arles**	**Marseille**	Bouches-du-Rhône (arrondissement of Marseille)
**Auch**	**Aire**	Landes
**Auch**	**Auch**	Gers
**Auch**	Bayonne	Basses-Pyrénées
**Auch**	**Tarbes**	Hautes-Pyrénées
Avignon	Avignon	Vaucluse (arrondissements of Apt and of Avignon)
Avignon	**Orange**	Vaucluse (arrondissements of Carpentras and of Orange)
Besançon	**Belley**	Ain
Besançon	Besançon	Doubs, Haute-Saône
Besançon	Metz	Moselle
Besançon	Nancy	Meurthe
Besançon	**Saint-Dié**	Vosges
Besançon	Strasbourg	Bas-Rhin, Haut-Rhin
Besançon	**Verdun**	Meuse
Bordeaux	Agen	Lot-et-Garonne
Bordeaux	**Angoulême**	Charente
Bordeaux	Bordeaux	Gironde
Bordeaux	La Rochelle	Charente-Inférieure
Bordeaux	**Luçon**	Vendée
Bordeaux	**Périgueux**	Dordogne
Bordeaux	Poitiers	Vienne and Deux-Sèvres
Bourges	Bourges	Cher and Indre
Bourges	Clermont	Puy-de-Dôme
Bourges	**Le Puy**	Haute-Loire
Bourges	Limoges	Creuse and Haute-Vienne
Bourges	Saint-Flour	Cantal
Bourges	**Tulle**	Corrèze
Cambrai	Arras	Pas-de-Calais (arrondissements of Arras, of Béthune and of Saint-Pol)
Cambrai	**Boulogne**	Pas-de-Calais (arrondissements of Boulogne, of Montreuil and of Saint-Omer)
Cambrai	Cambrai	Nord
Lyon	Autun	Saône-et-Loire (arrondissements of Autun and of Charolles)
Lyon	**Chalon-sur-Saône**	Saône-et-Loire (arrondissements of Chalon, of Louhans and of Mâcon)
Lyon	Dijon	Côte-d'Or
Lyon	**Langres**	Haute-Marne
Lyon	Lyon	Rhône and Loire
Lyon	**Saint-Claude**	Jura
**Narbonne**	**Béziers**	Hérault (arrondissements of Béziers and of Saint-Pons)
**Narbonne**	Carcassonne	Aude (arrondissement of Castelnaudary and, in the arrondissement of Carcassonne, the cantons of Alzonne, of Capendu, of Carcassonne 1 & 2, of Conques, of the Mas-Cabardès, of Peyriac and of Saissac)
**Narbonne**	Montpellier	Hérault (arrondissements of Lodève and of Montpellier)
**Narbonne**	**Narbonne**	Auof (arrondissements of Limoux and of Narbonne and, in the arrondissement of Carcassonne, the cantons of Lagrasse, Mouthoumet and of Tuchan)
**Narbonne**	**Nîmes**	Gard
**Narbonne**	**Perpignan**	Pyrénées-Orientales
Paris	**Blois**	Loir-et-Cher
Paris	**Chartres**	Eure-et-Loir
Paris	Meaux	Seine-et-Marne
Paris	Orléans	Loiret
Paris	Paris	Seine
Paris	Versailles	Seine-et-Oise
**Reims**	Amiens	Somme
**Reims**	**Beauvais**	Oise (arrondissements of Beauvais and of Senlis)
**Reims**	**Châlons-sur-Marne**	Marne (arrondissements of Châlons-sur-Marne, of Épernay, of Sainte-Menehould and of Vitry)
**Reims**	**Laon**	Aisne (arrondissements of Laon, of Saint-Quentin and of Vervins)
**Reims**	**Noyon**	Oise (arrondissements of Clermont and of Compiègne)
**Reims**	**Reims**	Ardennes and Marne (Arrondissement of Reims)
**Reims**	Soissons	Aisne (arrondissements of Château-Thierry and of Soissons)
Rouen	Bayeux	Calvados
Rouen	Coutances	Manche
Rouen	Évreux	Eure
Rouen	Rouen	Seine-Inférieure
Rouen	Sées	Orne
**Sens**	Auxerre	Yonne (arrondissements of Auxerre, of Avallon and of Tonnerre)
**Sens**	**Moulins**	Allier
**Sens**	**Nevers**	Nièvre
**Sens**	**Sens**	Yonne (arrondissements of Joigny and of Sens)
**Sens**	Troyes	Aube
**Toulouse**	**Montauban**	Tarn-et-Garonne
**Toulouse**	**Pamiers**	Ariège
**Toulouse**	Toulouse	Haute-Garonne
Tours	Angers	Maine-et-Loire
Tours	Le Mans	Mayenne, Sarthe
Tours	Nantes	Loire-Inférieure
Tours	Quimper	Finistère
Tours	Rennes	Ille-et-Vilaine (arrondissements of Montfort, of Redon, of Rennes and of Vitré)
Tours	Saint-Brieuc	Côtes-du-Nord
Tours	**Saint-Malo**	Ille-et-Vilaine (arrondissements of Fougères and of Saint-Malo)
Tours	Vannes	Morbihan
Tours	Tours	Indre-et-Loire
**Vienne**	Grenoble	Isère (arrondissements of Grenoble and of Saint-Marcelin)
**Vienne**	Valence	Drôme
**Vienne**	**Vienne**	Isère (arrondissements of La Tour-du-Pin and of Vienne)
**Vienne**	**Viviers**	Ardèche

(*)In italics, dioceses elevated to the rank of archdioceses.
(**)In bold, dioceses and archdioceses that were foreseen to be created or re-established. Not all of them were.

== Bibliography ==
- Convention du 11 juin 1817, entre Sa Majesté Très-Chrétienne et Sa Sainteté Pie VII, dévelopée, ou Introduction à l'histoire projettée de l'Eglise concordataire continuée: avec des notices sur les nouveaux amalgamés (in French). London: Schultz & Dean. 1817.
- de Pradt, Dominique Georges Frédéric de R. (1818). Les quatre concordats: suivis de considérations sur le gouvernement de l'église en général et sur l'église de France en particulier depuis 1515 (in French). Vol. III. Paris: Béchet.
