= Antipope Innocent III =

Cardinal, antipope in 1179/1180

- Elected: 29 September 1179
- Papacy began: 29 September 1179
- Papacy ended: January 1180
- Predecessor: Roman claimant: Alexander III; Antipapal claimant: Callixtus III
- Successor: Roman claimant: Alexander III; Antipapal claimant: Nicholas V
- Opposed to: Pope Alexander III

Personal details
- Born: Lando Di Sezze Sezze, Papal States
- Died: La Trinità della Cava, Campania

Innocent III (born Lando Di Sezze) was an antipope from 29 September 1179 to January 1180. Innocent III was born in Sezze in the Papal States and died in La Cava, Apulia. He was the last of four antipopes during the pontificate of Alexander III.

== Biography ==
Of German descent, Cardinal Sezze was elected Innocent III on 29 September 1179 by an anti-Alexander faction. Alexander, in January 1180, dispatched his opponent to the abbey of La Trinità della Cava, where he died.

== Election ==
In 1179, the enemies of Pope Alexander III (1159–1181) had successfully forced him to flee Rome, never to return. They had the support of Holy Roman Emperor Frederick I Barbarossa. Most other European countries supported Alexander III however.

== Papal claim defeated ==
The main support in Rome for Innocent III was from the powerful Roman Tusculum families, who had set up the two previous antipopes – Victor IV (1159–1164) and his successor, Paschal III (1164–1168). The brother of the late Victor IV, out of hatred for Alexander III, gave Lando a well-fortified castle at Palombara to defend against Alexander's supporters. A few months later however, Cardinal Hugo successfully bribed the guards to gain the castle. Innocent III and his supporters were then locked up for life in the monastery of La Cava in January 1180.

== See also ==
- Papal selection before 1059
- Papal conclave (since 1274)
