= Concordat =

Agreement or treaty between the Holy See of the Catholic Church and a sovereign state

A concordat (French pronunciation: [kɔ̃kɔʁda]) is a convention between the Holy See and a sovereign state that defines the relationship between the Catholic Church and the state in matters that concern both, i.e. the recognition and privileges of the Catholic Church in a particular country and with secular matters that affect church interests.

According to P. W. Brown the use of the term "concordat" does not appear "until the pontificate of Pope Martin V (1413–1431) in a work by Nicholas de Cusa, entitled De Concordantia Catholica. The first concordat dates from 1098, and from then to the beginning of the First World War the Holy See signed 74 concordats. Due to the substantial remapping of Europe that took place after the war, new concordats with legal successor states were necessary. The post–World War I era saw the greatest proliferation of concordats in history.

Although for a time after the Second Vatican Council, which ended in 1965, the term 'concordat' was dropped, it reappeared with the Polish Concordat of 1993 and the Portuguese Concordat of 2004. A different mode of relations between the Holy See and various states is still evolving, often contentiously, in the wake of a growing secularism and religious pluralism in the western world.

== Church teaching ==
The Catholic Church historically claimed not to be bound to one form of government over another, but was willing to work with any kind of government, so long as the rights of God and believers were maintained. Pius XI wrote in 1933:

Universally known is the fact that the Catholic Church is never bound to one form of government more than to another, provided the Divine rights of God and of Christian consciences are safe. She does not find any difficulty in adapting herself to various civil institutions, be they monarchic or republican, aristocratic or democratic.

== Church–state dichotomy ==
From a church–state perspective, the contentions regarding concordats involves two perspectives.

From a Catholic perspective, the Church has the moral and theological right to enter into diplomatic relations with states in order to reach agreements regarding the care of its members residing there. This is the concept of Libertas ecclesiae (freedom of the Church).

From a non-Catholic perspective, concordats may pose certain concerns such as:

- concordats may not be "the same as treaties" because they are entered into by an entity that is both religious and political in nature, viz., the Catholic Church, with exception to states which are expressly atheist or are identified as choosing anti-religious views, whereas any other treaty is regularly between two sovereign entities on a horizontal level, i.e., purely political in nature, and
- depending on the negotiations agreed upon in the concordat, non-Catholic religious groups face the threat of being marginalized. For example, in Spain, although the Constitution guarantees religious freedom, the Catholic Church is mentioned by name, and in practice holds a pre-eminent position among other religious groups. In recent years, debate has occurred regarding whether the Spanish government should maintain a concordat with the Vatican.

Due to these concerns, the United States did not establish diplomatic ties to the Vatican until the Ronald Reagan administration in 1984; and, to this day, the United States does not have a concordat with the Vatican, despite the two having a mutual "compromise" in terms of relationship.

"Although the United States will probably not go so far as some nations have by concluding a concordat with the Vatican, it will, in effect, further the religious purposes of the Vatican. Otherwise, the Vatican would have no interest in establishing diplomatic relations with the United States. Perhaps it is accurate to characterize the exchange of embassies as a compromise - meaning, the United States is willing to further the religious purposes of the Vatican, if the Vatican is willing to further the foreign policy objectives of the United States."

— Samuel W. Bettwy, "United States - Vatican Recognition: Background and Issues" (1984), p. 257-258

== Examples of concordats ==
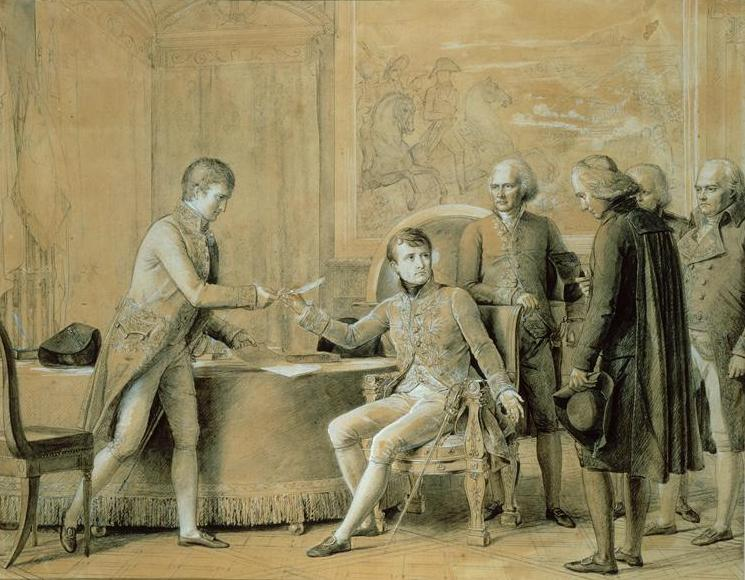
The Signing of the Concordat between France and the Holy See, 15 July 1801. Artist: François Gérard, (1770-1837). Musée National du Château de Versailles, Versailles

- The Concordat of 1801 was an agreement between Napoleon and Pope Pius VII. During the French Revolution, the National Assembly had taken Church properties and issued the Civil Constitution of the Clergy. Subsequent laws abolished Christian holidays. Many religious leaders had either gone into exile or been executed during the Reign of Terror. The Church gave up any claims to lands confiscated after 1790, but secured the right to public worship, subject to any public safety concerns on the part of the local prefect. Napoleon was able to pacify French Catholics, while limiting the papacy's influence in France. While the concordat restored some ties to the papacy, it largely favored the state. Within a year Napoleon unilaterally amended the agreement with the Organic Articles legislating religious practice.

Some concordats guarantee the Catholic Church the tax-exempt status of a charity, being by fact the largest charitable institution in the world, either stating this explicitly, as in Brazil (2008, Article 15) and Italy (1984, Article 7.3), or phrasing it indirectly, as in Portugal (2004, art. 12).

When the political will is present, such concordat privileges can be extended by domestic legislation. In 1992, the tax exemption granted the Church by the Italian concordat was interpreted by a law which permits the Catholic Church to avoid paying 90% of what it owes to the state for its commercial activities. Thus, a small shrine within the walls of a cinema, holiday resort, shop, restaurant or hotel is sufficient to confer religious exemption. In June 2007 Neelie Kroes, the European Commissioner for Competition announced an investigation of this. Then, in August, the deputy finance minister in Romano Prodi's fragile center-left coalition said the issue needed to be tackled in the next year's budget. However, after that nothing more about this was heard from the Barroso Commission and a few months later the Prodi government fell.

The Slovak concordat (2000, art. 20.2) ensures that church offertories are "not subject to taxation or to the requirement of public accountability".

This is also the case in Côte d'Ivoire, where far larger sums are involved. The Basilica at Yamoussoukro, is estimated to have cost $300 million, and the additional running expenses for what is the largest church in the world are also shielded from scrutiny by the 1992 concordat concluded with the Ivorian president. Houphouët-Boigny claimed that these funds came from his private fortune. A Vatican official is reported to have called the agreement over the foundation set up to administer these funds "a delicate matter". Nevertheless, this concordat ensures that the foundation's income and assets remain untaxed (art. 9.1), it holds these funds beyond the reach of both criminal and civil law (art. 7.1), it permits this money to be sent out of the country (art. 13.2) and it keeps all the foundation's documents "inviolable", in other words, secret (art. 8).

In Colombia there was a crisis between state and church in 1994 when Attorney-General Gustavo de Greiff accused several bishops of having illegal contacts with the FARC guerrillas. It turned out that under Colombia's concordat with the Holy See, members of the clergy could only be investigated by ecclesiastical courts which are ruled by canon law, and that the bishops were therefore immune from investigation by the civil authorities on what many in Colombia considered to be a serious felony.

== List ==
There have been at least several hundred concordats over the centuries. The following is a sortable list of the concordats and other bilateral agreements concluded by the Holy See.

Treaty	Contracting party	Date of conclusion	Date of entering into force
1107 Concordat of London with Henry I of	England	1 Aug 1107	
1122 Concordat of Worms between Pope Calixtus II and Henry V of the	Holy Roman Empire	23 Sep 1122	
1161 Concordat between Pope Alexander III and Géza II of	Hungary	1161	
1169 Concordat between Pope Alexander III and Stephen III of	Hungary	1169	
1201 agreement between Pope Innocent III and Otto IV of the	Holy Roman Empire	8 June 1201	
1206 Concordat between Pope Innocent III and Latin Patriarch of Constantinople Thomas Morosini of the	Latin Empire	March 1206	
1210 Parliament of Ravennika between Pope Innocent III and the princes of	Frankish Greece	May 1210	
1277 Concordat of Tonsberg between Jon Raude, Archbishop of Nidaros and Magnus VI of	Norway	1277	
1289 Concordat of the Forty Articles	Portugal	7 March 1289	
1418 Concordats of Constance	Aragon, Castile, England, France, Holy Roman Empire, Naples, Navarre, Portugal, Scotland, Sicily, Venice		21 March 1418
1426 Concordat between Pope Martin V and Charles VII of	France	1426	
Fürsten Konkordat between Pope Eugenius IV and the Princes Electors of the	Holy Roman Empire	Jan 1447	
1516 Concordat of Bologna between Pope Leo X and King Francis I of	France	Sep 1516	
1610 Concordat of Mi'kmaw between Pope Paul V and Grand Chief Henri Membertou of	Mi'kmaw Nation	1610	
1737 Concordat of Wschowa between the Holy See and	Polish–Lithuanian Commonwealth	10 Jul 1737	13 Sep 1737
1753 Concordat of Bologna between Pope Benedict XIV and King Ferdinand VI of	Spain	1753	
1801 Concordat between Pope Pius VII and Napoléon of	France	15 July 1801	
1803 Concordat between Pope Pius VII and	Italy	16 September 1803	2 November 1803
1813 Concordat of Fontainebleau between Pope Pius VII and Napoléon of	France	25 Jan. 1813	
1817 Concordat between the Holy See and	Bavaria	5 Jun 1817	
1817 Concordat between the Holy See and King Louis XVIII of	France	11 Jun 1817	
1827 Concordat between the Holy See and the	Netherlands	16 Sep. 1827	
1847 Concordat between the Holy See and	Russia	3 Aug 1847	
1851 Concordat between the Holy See and	Spain	16 Mar 1851	11 May 1851
1852 Concordat between the Holy See and	Costa Rica	7 Oct 1852	Dec 1852
1854 Concordat between the Holy See and	Guatemala	1852	1854
1855 Concordat between the Holy See and	Austria	18 Aug 1855	
1862 Concordat between the Holy See and	El Salvador	Apr 1862	
1882 Concordat between the Holy See and	Russia	23 Dec. 1882	
1886 Concordat between the Holy See and	Portugal	23 June 1886	
1886 Concordat between the Holy See and	Montenegro	18 Aug. 1886	
1887 Concordat between the Holy See and	Colombia	1887	
1914 Concordat between the Holy See and	Serbia	24 June 1914	20 March 1915
1922 Concordat between the Holy See and	Latvia	30 May 1922	3 Nov 1922
1925 Concordat between the Holy See and	Poland	10 Feb 1925	2 Jul 1925
1927 Concordat between the Holy See and	Romania	10 May 1927	29 May 1929
1927 Concordat between the Holy See and	Lithuania	27 Sep 1927	
1928 Concordat between the Holy See and	Colombia	5 May 1928	
1929 Lateran Treaty between the Holy See and	Italy	11 Feb 1929	7 Jun 1929
1929 Prussian Concordat between the Holy See and	(Kingdom of Prussia) Prussian Free State	14 July 1929	
1933 Concordat between the Holy See and	Austria	5 June 1933	
1933 Reichskonkordat between the Holy See and	Germany	20 Jul 1933	
1940 Concordat between the Holy See and	Portugal	7 May 1940	
1953 Concordat between the Holy See and	Spain	27 Aug 1953	27 Oct 1953
1954 Concordat between the Holy See and	Dominican Republic	16 June 1954	
1993 Concordat between the Holy See and	Poland	28 Jul 1993	25 Apr 1998
1993 Fundamental Agreement between the Holy See and	Israel	30 Dec 1993	10 Mar 1994
1996 Agreements between the Holy See and	Croatia	18 Dec 1996	11 and 25 Feb 1997
1997 Agreement between the Holy See and	Hungary	20 June 1997	3 April 1998
1997 Legal Personality Agreement between the Holy See the State of	Israel	10 Nov 1997	
1998 Agreement between the Holy See and	Croatia	9 Oct 1998	30 Dec 1998
2000 Basic Agreement between the Holy See and	Palestine	15 February 2000	15 February 2000
2000 Agreement between the Holy See and	Latvia	8 November 2000	25 October 2002
2004 Treaty between the Holy See and	Slovakia	13 May 2004	9 Jul 2004
2004 Concordat between the Holy See and	Portugal	18 May 2004	
2004 Concordat between the Holy See and	Slovenia	28 May 2004	
Basic Agreement between the Holy See and	Bosnia and Herzegovina	19 Apr 2006	25 Oct 2007
2008 Concordat between the Holy See and	Brazil	13 Nov 2008	
2009 Concordat between the Holy See and	Schleswig-Holstein	12 Jan 2009	
2015 Comprehensive agreement between the Holy See and	Palestine	26 Jun 2015	2 Jan 2016
2016 Framework agreement on matters of mutual interest between the Holy See and	Democratic Republic of Congo	20 May 2016	
2016 Framework agreement on matters of mutual interest between the Holy See and	Central African Republic	8 Sep 2016	
2016 Framework agreement regarding the legal status of the Catholic Church between the Holy See and	Benin	22 Oct 2016	
2024 Treaty on Certain Legal Issues between the Holy See and	Czech Republic	24 Oct 2024	

== Bibliography ==
- Baker, Michael (2010). "Security and the sacred: examining Canada's legal response to the clash of public safety and religious freedom" (PDF). Touro International Law Review. 13 (1). Archived from the original (PDF) on 27 May 2010.
- DiMarco, Erica (Spring 2009). "The tides of Vatican influence in Italian reproductive matters: from abortion to assisted reproduction" (PDF). Rutgers Journal of Law and Religion. 10 (2). Archived from the original (PDF) on 20 July 2011.
- Hosack, Kristen A. (2010). "Napoleon Bonaparte's Concordat and the French Revolution". Constructing the Past. 11 (1) 5.
- Hughes, John Jay (1974). "The Reich Concordat 1933: Capitulation or Compromise?". Australian Journal of Politics & History. 20 (2): 164–175. doi:10.1111/j.1467-8497.1974.tb01110.x.
- Metz, René (1960). What is Canon Law? (1st ed.). New York: Hawthorn Books.
- Petkoff, Peter (2007). "Legal perspectives and religious perspectives of religious rights under international law in the Vatican Concordats (1963–2004)". Law and Justice: The Christian Law Review. 158.
- Plichtová, Jana; Petrjánošová, Magda (June 2008). "Freedom of religion, institution of conscientious objection and political practice in post-communist Slovakia". Human Affairs. 18 (1): 37–51. doi:10.2478/v10023-008-0004-6.
- "Concordat" . Encyclopædia Britannica. Vol. 6 (11th ed.). 1911. pp. 832–834.
