= Holy See–Russia relations =

- Holy See: Russia

Holy See–Russia relations (Russian: Российско-Ватиканские отношения) are the bilateral relations between the Holy See and Russia. The Holy See has an Apostolic Nunciature in Moscow, and Russia has an embassy to the Holy See located in Rome.

As the Russian Orthodox Church is the largest organization of Eastern Orthodoxy, Holy See–Russia relations partly reflect the relations between the Catholic Church and the Eastern Orthodox Church. Historically, the Vatican has sought to balance its goals of trying to bring the Russian Orthodox into communion with Rome while maintaining good relations with the Russian government to improve conditions for the Catholic Church in Russia.

Since Vladimir Putin became president of Russia in 1999, he has met with three of the four contemporaneous popes (John Paul II, Benedict XVI, and Francis) at least once, and has visited Vatican City six times.

== Ecumenical relations ==
Holy See–Russia relations are largely linked to ecumenical relations with the Russian Orthodox Church.

== Relationship 1917–1958 revolution ==
=== Benedict XV ===
The end of World War I brought about the revolutionary development that Benedict XV had foreseen in his first encyclical. With the Russian Revolution, the Holy See was faced with a new, so far unknown, situation: an ideology and government which rejected not only the Catholic Church but also religion as a whole. "Some hope developed among the United Orthodox in Ukraine and Armenia, but many of the representatives there disappeared or were jailed in the following years. Several Orthodox bishops from Omsk and Simbirsk wrote an open letter to Pope Benedict XV, as the Father of all Christianity, describing the murder of priests, the destruction of their churches and other persecutions in their areas."

=== Pius XI ===
Worried by the persecution of Christians in the Soviet Union, Pius XI mandated Berlin Nuncio Eugenio Pacelli to work secretly on diplomatic arrangements between the Vatican and the Soviet Union. Pacelli negotiated food shipments and met with Soviet representatives, including Foreign Minister Georgi Chicherin, who rejected any kind of religious education and the ordination of priests and bishops but offered agreements without the points vital to the Vatican. Despite Vatican pessimism and a lack of visible progress, Pacelli continued the secret negotiations until Pius XI ordered them to be discontinued in 1927 because they generated no results and were dangerous to the Church if they were made public.

The "harsh persecution short of total annihilation of the clergy, monks, and nuns and other people associated with the Church" continued well into the 1930s. In addition to executing and exiling many clerics, monks and laymen, the confiscation of Church implements "for victims of famine" and the closing of churches were common. However, according to an official report based on the 1936 census, some 55 percent of Soviet citizens identified themselves openly as religious, and others possibly concealed their belief.

Pius XI described the lack of reaction to the persecution of Christians in such countries as the Soviet Union, Mexico, Nazi Germany and Spain as a "conspiracy of silence". In 1937, he issued the encyclical Divini Redemptoris, which condemned communism and the Soviet regime. He named a French Jesuit to go to the Soviet Union and secretly consecrate Roman Catholic bishops, which was a failure since most of them ended up in gulags or were otherwise killed by the socialist regime.

=== Pius IX ===
Pope Pius IX, who faced his own problems with revolutionary movements in his Church State, first tried to position himself in the middle, strongly opposing revolutionary and violent opposition against the Russian authorities and appealing to them for more Church freedom.

=== Pius XII ===
According to Winston Churchill, the French PM Pierre Laval asked Joseph Stalin, "Can't you do something to encourage religion and the Catholics in Russia? It would help me so much with the Pope." Stalin replied, "The Pope? How many divisions has he got?"

Pius XII's pontificate faced extraordinary problems. In the 1930s, the public protests and condemnations of his predecessors had not deterred the Soviet authorities from persecuting all Christian churches as hostile to Marxism–Leninism. The persecution of the Catholic Church was a part of an overall attempt to eradicate religion in the Soviet Union. In 1940, after Germany had occupied western Poland, the Soviet Union annexed eastern Poland, along with the Baltic countries, including the predominantly Catholic Lithuania.

Two months after his election on May 12, 1939, in Singolari Animi, a papal letter to the Sacred Congregation of the Oriental Church, Pius XII reported again the persecutions of the Catholic faith in the Soviet Union. Three weeks later, while he was honouring the memory of Saint Vladimir on the 950th anniversary of his baptism, he welcomed Ruthenian priests and bishops and members of the Russian colony in Rome, prayed for those who suffered in their country and awaited with their tears the hour of the coming of the Lord.

Persecution began at once as large parts of Poland and the Baltic States were incorporated into the Soviet Union. Almost immediately, the United Catholic Churches of Armenia, Ukraine and Ruthenia were attacked. While most Oriental Christians belong to an Orthodox Church, some, such as the Armenian Catholic Church, Ukrainian Greek Catholic Church and the Ruthenian Greek Catholic Church, are united with Rome, which allowed them to keep their own Oriental liturgy and Church laws.

After World War II, the Russian Orthodox Church was given some freedom by the government of Joseph Stalin, but not the Eastern Catholic Churches, which were united with Rome. Leaders of those Churches faced intense pressure to break with Rome and to unite with Moscow. Pope Pius addressed specifically the Ruthenian Catholic Church in Ukraine. The encyclical Orientales omnes Ecclesias is a summary of the relations between the Eastern churches and Rome until the persecutions in 1945.

Some Ruthenians, resisting Polonisation, felt deserted by the Vatican and returned to the Russian Orthodox Church during Pius XI's pontificate.

== Era of the Soviet Union ==
=== John Paul II ===
There were mixed reactions in Russia on the papacy of Pope John Paul II. Many Russians were happy that John Paul had reduced the influence of atheistic Communism in Eastern Europe and contributed to a rebirth of Christianity in the country. However, many others did not like the fact that the fall of the Soviet Union had also provoked a loss of Russian influence in Eastern Europe. The fact that John Paul was Polish also caused tensions, since there is a historic ethno-religious rivalry between Poland and Russia.

== After 1991 ==
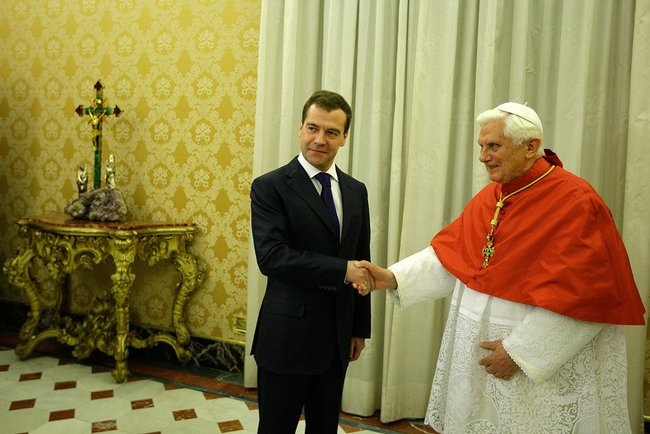
The Russian president Dmitry Medvedev who is Russian Orthodox, meeting Pope Benedict XVI in Vatican City. Holy See–Russia relations partly reflect the larger Catholic Church and Eastern Orthodox Church relations.

After 1991, the Russian government started a dialogue with the Vatican.

The Holy See and the Russian Federation established full diplomatic relations in December 2009 following the meeting between Pope Benedict XVI and Russian President Dimitry Medvedev. President Vladimir Putin helped to arrange a meeting between the Pope and Patriarch Kirill at Havana, Cuba in 2016. The meeting also resulted in the two promulgating a joint declaration.

On 4 July 2019, however, it was revealed that tensions still remained between the Vatican and Russia, with the Russian Orthodox Church and the Russo-Ukrainian war being the major causes of these tensions. Despite holding a "cordial" meeting with Russian President Vladimir Putin in the Vatican, Pope Francis stated it is unlikely that he will visit Russia unless Putin agrees to not include the Russian Orthodox Church in the invitation, which Putin stated would be unlikely as well. Pope Francis has also declared support for the Ukrainian Greek Catholic Church, which has expressed opposition to Putin and the Russian Orthodox Church and also the 2016 joint declaration.

In December 2025, Pope Leo XIV made an intervention on the Russia Ukraine war peace negotiations, stressing the importance of European involvement in any eventual peace settlement.

== See also ==
- 1847 Agreement between the Holy See and Russia
- Catholicism in Russia
- Foreign relations of the Holy See
- Foreign relations of Russia
- Holy See–Soviet Union relations
- Catholic–Eastern Orthodox relations
  - Joint Declaration of Pope Francis and Patriarch Kirill
- Edmund A. Walsh S.J.
- Michel d'Herbigny S.J.
- Augustin Bea S.J.
