= Concordat Prison =

Prison for Catholic priests in Francoist Spain

Coordinates: 41.5016°N 5.7738°W

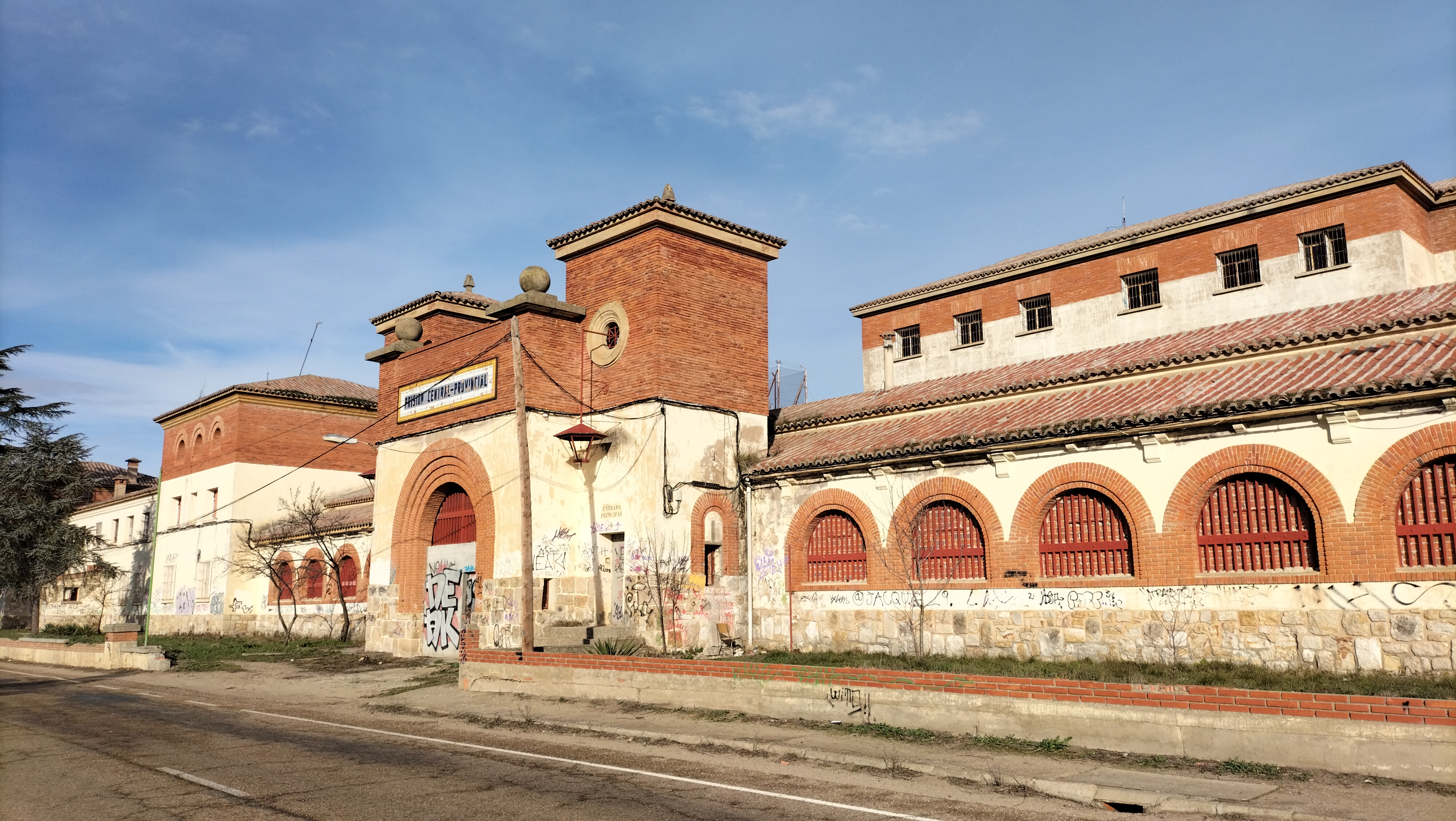
The abandoned provincial prison of Zamora in 2025.

The Concordat Prison (in Spanish, Cárcel Concordataria) refers to the prison that the Francoist State in Spain operated for dissident Catholic priests. It was a pavilion of the provincial prison of Zamora.

The Concordat of 1953 allowed that jailed priests did their time in religious houses, but conservative convents were not pleased to take leftist priests and progressive convents could sympathize with the prisoner. Lots of the prisoners were Basques. Already in the Spanish Civil War, Basque nationalist priests had rejected the rebels.

The priests were isolated from the common and political prisoners in the rest of the prison. While most of the priests were there for political crimes, there were also child abusers, who led a separate life. Many could have skipped prison by paying fines but refused.

The prisoners suffered of cold and bad healthcare. While the prison food was bad, their families provided them so that those who sought austerity insisted to not be sent so much food. Outside contacts were very limited. Visits were limited to close relatives. Catalan and Basque priests were forced to speak Spanish so that the guards could spy on them. The media was censored, even church publications. Information about the assassination of premier Luis Carrero Blanco and the 1969 Synod of Bishops was removed. Correspondence was rationed and censored.

The Catholic hierarchy was incommoded both by the "exalted anti-Francoists" and by the government overstepping. The prisoners interpreted the caution of the bishops as lack of support.

In 1969 an escape tunnel was built but it was discovered near completion. In 1972, Lluís Maria Xirinachs held a hunger and thirst strike until he was removed from Zamora. In 1973, six out of seven prisoners (excluding a severely ill Basque) mutinied against their concordat special status and for individual cells. They smashed their furniture and started a hunger strike. Their protest was supported by many Catholics but the bishops were wary of confronting the regime. There were further protests in 1974 and 1975.

In 1976, the Civil Guard transferred the prisoners to convents. Only one non-political prisoner remained in Zamora.
