= Concordat of 1161 =

1161 Agreement between the Kingdom of Hungary and the Papal States

The Concordat of 1161 was an agreement between the Kingdom of Hungary and the Papal States, signed by Géza II of Hungary and papal legate Pietro di Miso in late summer or early autumn 1161. The Hungarian monarch squeezed out significant church government concessions for himself in exchange for switching sides and pledging support for Pope Alexander III against the Ghibelline Antipope Victor IV.

== Background ==
Disputes among European powers led to the formation of two coalitions in the late 1140s. One alliance was formed by the Byzantine Emperor Manuel I Komnenos and Conrad III of Germany in the Holy Roman Empire against Roger II of Sicily who had invaded Byzantine territories. Under Géza II, Hungary belonged to the coalition of the Kingdom of Sicily, the Papal States and the Kingdom of France under Louis VII. The alliance between Roger II and Pope Eugene III soon disintegrated and the Hungarian monarch also strained relationship with the Holy See. When Pope Eugene sent his envoys to Hungary to strengthen the "faith and discipline" of the Hungarian church in 1152, Géza forbade the papal envoys to enter Hungary, which shows that his relationship with the Holy See had deteriorated.

Holy Roman Emperor Frederick Barbarossa received the envoys of Manuel, who proposed a joint invasion of Hungary, but Frederick refused their offer in the summer of 1156. Frederick's close advisor, Daniel, Bishop of Prague, visited Hungary twice in 1157. On these occasions, a dynastic relationship had established between the Árpád and the Přemyslid royal houses, and Géza promised that he would support the Holy Roman Emperor with auxiliary troops if the emperor invaded Italy. Géza's younger brothers, Stephen then Ladislaus conspired against him. In the summer of 1157, Stephen fled to the Holy Roman Empire, seeking Emperor Frederick's protection against Géza. Upon the emperor's demand, Géza accepted Frederick Barbarossa as arbitrator in his conflict with Stephen and sent his envoys to Regensburg in January 1158.

== Schism in 1159 ==
The death of Pope Adrian IV on 1 September 1159 caused a schism, because the college of the cardinals was divided: the majority of the cardinals was opposed to Frederick's policy, but a minority supported him. The first group elected Alexander III pope, but the pro-imperial cardinals chose Victor IV. Frederick summoned a synod at Pavia in early 1160, where the Hungarian delegation, among others, also attended. Pro-Frederick chronicler Rahewin claims that Hungary acknowledged Victor IV as the legitimate pope, but the subsequent data contradict this. Both Alexander III and Victor IV sent their papal legates to Hungary in the first months of 1160. Alexander's envoys, cardinals Pietro di Miso (Petrus de Miso) and Giulio (Julius), the Bishop of Palestrina tried to force Géza II to take an open position, but the king took a wait-and-see attitude and remained neutral on the issue. Frederick's envoy, Daniel of Prague traveled to Hungary for the third time in the second half of March 1160 in order to convince Géza to support the anti-pope and to recognize the decisions of the Council of Pavia. Daniel arrived at the royal court on Easter Good Friday. The Hungarian monarch asked for time to respond. Daniel left Hungary in April 1160 without success. Despite that Frederick was convinced that Hungary supported Victor IV in the summer of 1160.

At the Council of Toulouse in the autumn of 1160, Henry II of England and Louis VII of France declared Alexander III pope, and pronounced excommunication upon Victor IV. Several other realms, including the Byzantine Empire and the Republic of Venice joined Alexander's cause by the end of the year.

== The concordat ==
[...] "As I see your heart filled with the advancement and unity of the Church, may I also contribute to this by reporting to Your Excellency that Our Lord King [Géza II], allowing my requests, accepted and confirmed Lord Alexander [as Pope] altogether with Our whole Church. In making this final decision, we persevered in the matter and have already sent to Lord Alexander the King's letter, along with my insignificance's letter. And further, if we can please your Holiness something, tell me and that I am willing to obey in accordance with my talent."

— Archbishop Lucas of Esztergom's letter (missilis) to Archbishop Eberhard of Salzburg in 1161

Papal legates Pietro di Miso and Giulio of Palestrina arrived to Hungary for the second time in late summer or early autumn 1161.The public purpose of their embassy was to confirm Lucas as Archbishop of Esztergom and bring the pallium to him. At the same time, in order to be recognized by the Hungarian king, Pope Alexander offered Géza significant church government concessions, and his cardinals presumably came to Hungary to clarify and finalize the details of this. A letter from Archbishop Lucas – an influential advisor to the monarch – to his ally, Eberhard, Archbishop of Salzburg, who was the leading pro-Alexander figure in the Holy Roman Empire, revealed his influence carried significant weight with Géza II when he changed the direction of his foreign policy. Lucas presented the case as if he alone had been responsible for Géza II's recognition of Pope Alexander, as he wrote "I have managed through appeals to cause our Lord the King and our whole church to accept Alexander". Several historians – including Gyula Pauler and József Gerics – accepted the letter's content, while Ferenc Makk noted that there is no other source which emphasizes Lucas' role in the events beside his own letter.

Géza II and papal legate Pietro di Miso signed a concordat around late August 1161. According to that treaty, Géza promised that he would not depose or transfer prelates without the consent of the Holy See; on the other hand, the pope acknowledged that no papal legates could be sent to Hungary without the king's permission and the Hungarian prelates were only allowed to appeal to the Holy See with the king's consent. German historian Walther Holtzmann argued Pope Alexander was under pressure, so he was forced to make concessions. According to his view, it was more important for the pope to divert the Hungarians from Victor than the rights of the Holy See that he assigned to the Hungarian king in the concordat. According to Hungarian historian Gyula Kristó, Géza II renounced his right of investiture, but simultaneously he took advantage of the crisis situation of the Holy See and ensured his say in Hungarian church affairs with the agreement. The text of the Concordat of 1161 has not survived. Historian Kornél Szovák considered it is possible that only an oral agreement was reached between Géza II and Pietro di Miso. Historian László Gálos claimed no concordat was concluded in 1161, as "significant concessions were out of place in a century when the church was fighting its own battle for its primacy and independence". However, John of Salisbury and Thomas Becket protested against the "abuses" committed by the Sicilian and Hungarian monarchs in their letter to Pope Alexander III.

Altogether two sources refer to the agreement. A letter of imperial notary Burchard to Nicholas, abbot of Siegburg mentions that "ill-fated Roland [i.e. Pope Alexander III] granted the Hungarian [king] the privilege of donating and giving the archbishopric shoulder straps to the archbishops of Hungary, as often as they choose [such]; and the bishops and ecclesiastics there should be able to negotiate with the Romans [Holy See] only by his will and through him". Additionally, German theologian Gerhoh of Reichersberg, a strong advocate of Gregorian ideas, mentions in his work De investigatione Anti-Christi libri III that "[...] the kingdom of Hungarians have so separated themselves [from the papacy] that they do not accept appeals of this kind or admit embassies burdening monasteries or other abodes of God's servants". Consequently, Géza II and his successors were granted the right that the king of Hungary can hand over the pallium to the archbishops of Hungary with his own hand, members of the Hungarian clergy can only appeal to the pope with the consent of the monarch (appellatio), the pope can only send papal legates and envoys to the realm with the consent of the king of Hungary. In practice, the pope and the Hungarian high clergy could only communicate with each other with the permission of the king. In exchange for these rights, the Hungarian monarch promised that he would not transfer bishops from one diocese to another without papal approval, as well as deprive them of their office. Historian László Koszta claimed the status of the Archdiocese of Kalocsa within the Hungarian church hierarchy also had to be sorted out at that time. Historian Sándor Hunyadi argued Hartvik's official hagiography of Saint Stephen I of Hungary may have had an influence on the demands of the king's ecclesiastical jurisdiction, which also reflected on the Sicilian church reforms.

== Aftermath ==
Géza II died in May 1162. His fifteen-year-old son Stephen III ascended the Hungarian throne, but his two uncles, Ladislaus and Stephen, who had joined the court of the Byzantine Empire, challenged his right to the crown. A civil war broke out which was followed by Byzantine military interventions until 1167. Under different circumstances than his father Géza, Stephen III concluded a concordat with the Holy See in 1169, renouncing the control of the appointment of the prelates and thereby repealing the agreement of 1161.

== Sources ==
- Bodri, Ferenc (2003). Lukács érsek és kora [Archbishop Lucas and his Times] (in Hungarian). Kossuth Kiadó. ISBN 963-09-4474-X.
- Hunyadi, Sándor (2016). "Magyarország és a pápaság egyezményei az 1160-as években [The Agreements between Hungary and the Papacy in the 1160s]". Fons (in Hungarian). 23 (1). Szentpétery Imre Történettudományi Alapítvány: 119–143. ISSN 1217-8020.
- Kádár, Tamás (2018). "A külföldi uralkodóházak tagjai, a külhoni hűbéres fejedelmek, valamint az egyházi főméltóságok és a pápai legátusok tartózkodásai Magyarországon 1000–1205 között [The Stays of Members of Foreign Ruling Houses, Foreign Vassal Princes, Ecclesiastical Dignitaries and Papal Legates in Hungary between 1000 and 1205]". Történeti Tanulmányok. Acta Universitatis Debreceniensis (in Hungarian). 26: 6–83. ISSN 1217-4602.
- Körmendi, Tamás (2003). "Lukács [Lucas]". In Beke, Margit (ed.). Esztergomi érsekek 1001–2003 [Archbishops of Esztergom 1001–2003] (in Hungarian). Szent István Társulat. pp. 59–72. ISBN 963-361-472-4.
- Makk, Ferenc (1989). The Árpáds and the Comneni: Political Relations between Hungary and Byzantium in the 12th century (Translated by György Novák). Akadémiai Kiadó. ISBN 963-05-5268-X.
- Szovák, Kornél (1996). "Pápai–magyar kapcsolatok a 12. században [Papal–Hungarian Relations in the 12th Century]". In Zombori, István (ed.). Magyarország és a Szentszék kapcsolatának 1000 éve [One Thousand Years of the Contacts between Hungary and the Holy See] (in Hungarian). Magyar Egyháztörténeti Enciklopédia Munkaközösség. pp. 21–46. ISBN 963-8472-17-0.
- Thoroczkay, Gábor, ed. (2018). Írott források az 1116–1205 közötti magyar történelemről [Written Sources of the Hungarian History between 1116 and 1205] (in Hungarian). Szegedi Középkorász Műhely. ISBN 978-615-80398-3-3.
