= Holy See–Soviet Union relations =

Holy See–Soviet relations
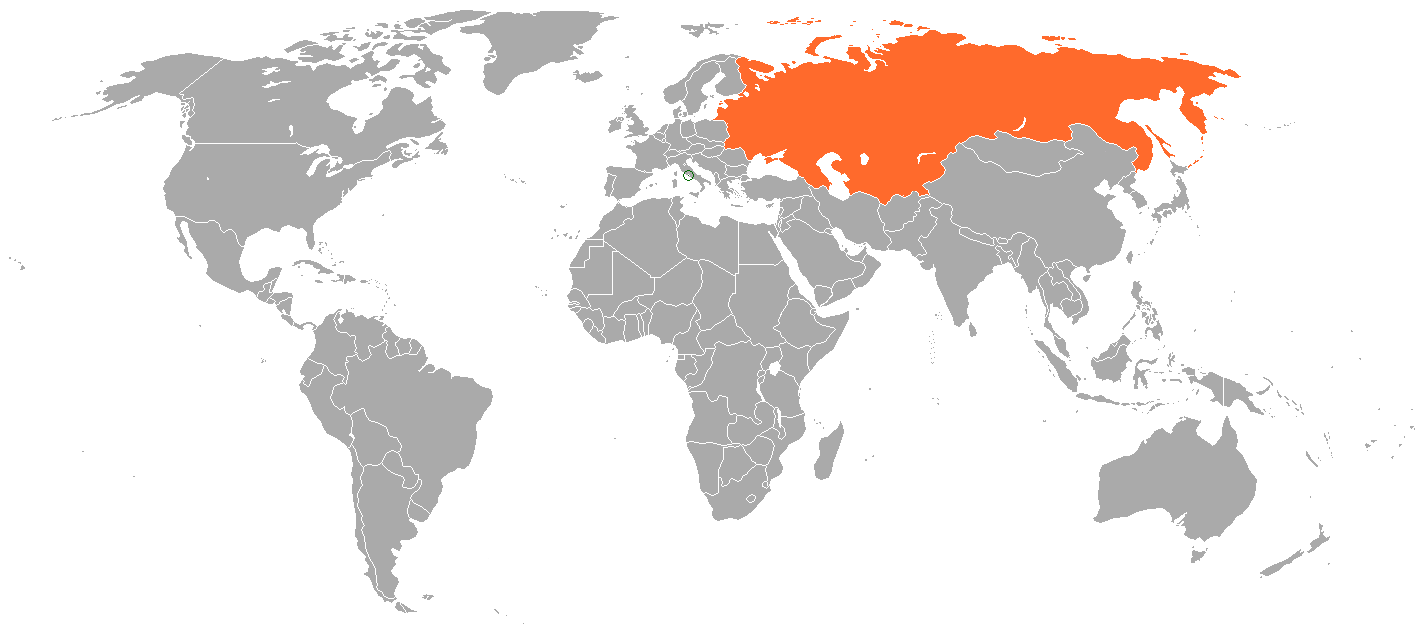

- Holy See: Soviet Union

Holy See–Soviet Union relations were marked by long-standing ideological disagreements between the Catholic Church and the Soviet Union. The Holy See attempted to enter in a pragmatic dialogue with Soviet leaders during the papacies of John XXIII and Paul VI. In the 1990s, Pope John Paul II's diplomatic policies were cited as one of the principal factors that led to the dissolution of the Soviet Union.

== Heightened tensions (1917–1958) ==
=== Benedict XV ===
The end of World War I brought about the revolutionary development that Benedict XV had foreseen in his first encyclical. With the Russian Revolution, the Holy See was faced with a new, so far unknown, situation: an ideology and government which rejected not only the Catholic Church but also religion as a whole. "Some hope developed among the United Orthodox in Ukraine and Armenia, but many of the representatives there disappeared or were jailed in the following years. Several Orthodox bishops from Omsk and Simbirsk wrote an open letter to Pope Benedict XV, as the Father of all Christianity, describing the murder of priests, the destruction of their churches and other persecutions in their areas."

=== Pius XI ===
Worried by the persecution of Christians in the Soviet Union, Pius XI mandated Berlin Nuncio Eugenio Pacelli to work secretly on diplomatic arrangements between the Vatican and the Soviet Union. Pacelli negotiated food shipments and met with Soviet representatives, including Foreign Minister Georgi Chicherin, who rejected any kind of religious education and the ordination of priests and bishops but offered agreements without the points vital to the Vatican. Despite Vatican pessimism and a lack of visible progress, Pacelli continued the secret negotiations until Pius XI ordered them to be discontinued in 1927 because they generated no results and were dangerous to the Church if they were made public.

The "harsh persecution short of total annihilation of the clergy, monks, and nuns and other people associated with the Church" continued well into the 1930s. In addition to executing and exiling many clerics, monks and laymen, the confiscation of Church implements "for victims of famine" and the closing of churches were common. However, according to an official report based on the 1936 census, some 55 percent of Soviet citizens identified themselves openly as religious, and others possibly concealed their belief.

Pius XI described the lack of reaction to the persecution of Christians in such countries as the Soviet Union, Mexico, Nazi Germany and Spain as a "conspiracy of silence". In 1937, he issued the encyclical Divini Redemptoris, which condemned communism and the Soviet regime. He named a French Jesuit to go to the Soviet Union and secretly consecrate Roman Catholic bishops, which was a failure since most of them ended up in gulags or were otherwise killed by the socialist regime.

=== Pius XII ===
According to Winston Churchill, the French PM Pierre Laval asked Joseph Stalin, "Can't you do something to encourage religion and the Catholics in Russia? It would help me so much with the Pope." Stalin replied, "The Pope? How many divisions has he got?"

Pius XII's pontificate faced extraordinary problems. In the 1930s, the public protests and condemnations of his predecessors had not deterred the Soviet authorities from persecuting all Christian churches as hostile to Marxism–Leninism. The persecution of the Catholic Church was a part of an overall attempt to eradicate religion in the Soviet Union. In 1940, after Germany had occupied western Poland, the Soviet Union annexed eastern Poland, along with the Baltic countries, including the predominantly Catholic Lithuania.

Two months after his election on May 12, 1939, in Singolari Animi, a papal letter to the Sacred Congregation of the Oriental Church, Pius XII reported again the persecutions of the Catholic faith in the Soviet Union. Three weeks later, while he was honouring the memory of Saint Vladimir on the 950th anniversary of his baptism, he welcomed Ruthenian priests and bishops and members of the Russian colony in Rome, prayed for those who suffered in their country and awaited with their tears the hour of the coming of the Lord.

Persecution began at once as large parts of Poland and the Baltic States were incorporated into the Soviet Union. Almost immediately, the United Catholic Churches of Armenia, Ukraine and Ruthenia were attacked. While most Oriental Christians belong to an Orthodox Church, some, such as the Armenian Catholic Church, Ukrainian Greek Catholic Church and the Ruthenian Greek Catholic Church, are united with Rome, which allowed them to keep their own Oriental liturgy and Church laws.

After World War II, the Russian Orthodox Church was given some freedom by the government of Joseph Stalin, but not the Eastern Catholic Churches, which were united with Rome. Leaders of those Churches faced intense pressure to break with Rome and to unite with Moscow. Pope Pius addressed specifically the Ruthenian Catholic Church in Ukraine. The encyclical Orientales omnes Ecclesias is a summary of the relations between the Eastern churches and Rome until the persecutions in 1945.

Some Ruthenians, resisting Polonisation, felt deserted by the Vatican and returned to the Russian Orthodox Church during Pius XI's pontificate.

== Dialogue (1958–1978) ==
=== John XXIII ===
The papacy of Pope John XXIII had attempts to reconcile with the Russian Orthodox Church in the hope of reducing tensions with the Soviet Union and contributing to peace in the world. The Second Vatican Council did not condemn communism nor even mention it, in what some have called a secret agreement between the Holy See and the Soviet Union. In Pacem in terris, John XXIII also sought to prevent nuclear war and tried to improve relations between the Soviet Union and the United States. He began a policy of dialogue with Soviet leaders to seek conditions in which Eastern Catholics could find relief from persecution.

=== Paul VI ===
Pope Paul VI continued John XXIII's policy of dialogue with Soviet leaders to reduce persecutions against local Christians. His policy has been called Ostpolitik because it closely resembled similar policies that were being adopted by some nations of Western Europe such as West Germany. He received Foreign Minister Andrei Gromyko and the Chairman of the Presidium of the Supreme Soviet Nikolai Podgorny in 1966 and 1967 in the Vatican.

== John Paul II and Soviet collapse (1978–1991) ==
Pope John Paul II has long been credited with being instrumental in bringing down communism in Catholic Eastern Europe by being the spiritual inspiration behind its downfall and a catalyst for a peaceful revolution in Poland. In February 2004, the Pope was even nominated for a Nobel Peace Prize to honor his life's work in opposing communism and in helping to reshape the world after the collapse of the Soviet Union. However, there has been much debate among historians on the realistic significance of John Paul II's opposition to communism in the Soviet regime's eventual fall. While most scholars agree that his intervention was influential in ending the Polish Communist Party's rule, there is much disagreement about his role in the collapse of the Soviet Union. Historians differ also in their opinions on the significance of the influence of John Paul II, as opposed to that of other economic and political factors. Thus, it is necessary to investigate the relative importance of John Paul II's role in the collapse of Eastern European communism by analyzing the historical events from his election to the papacy in 1978 to the collapse of the Soviet Union in 1991.

On October 16, 1978, Karol Wojtyla was elected to the papacy. As the first-ever Polish pope and the first non-Italian to be elected to the papacy in over four centuries, his election came as somewhat of a surprise to many Catholic scholars worldwide. Wojtyla chose to take the name John Paul II, after his predecessor, John Paul I, who was pope for barely a month before his death on September 28, 1978. Religious and political leaders alike wondered what it would mean for a citizen of a communist country to become pope. Poles, on the other hand, rejoiced at the news.

Having lived under both the Nazi and the Soviet regimes, the new pope was unwavering in his opposition to both fascism and communism. While the Vatican had always officially opposed communism because of its atheism, Pope John Paul II lost no time in making his theological opposition into an active policy of confrontation. In his first encyclical, he pinpointed religious freedom as the paramount human right and argued that it was the duty of the Church to protect that right. Simultaneously, he rejected the general Cold War diplomacy of appeasement by removing or demoting Church leaders who had enacted the policy of Ostpolitik, or quiet negotiation with communist leaders. Pope John Paul II publicly criticized communism.

Despite warnings from Leonid Brezhnev, General Secretary of the Central Committee of the Communist Party of the Soviet Union, not to interfere in Poland, the new pope visited his homeland within the first year of his papacy. On June 2, 1979, John Paul II made his first papal visit to Poland, and three million people came to the capital Warsaw to greet him. The pope held Mass publicly in the Victory Square, Warsaw, which was usually reserved for state-sponsored events. In the Lenin Shipyard, John Paul II held Mass in memory of the Polish workers who had been killed in a 1970 strike and carried a large wooden cross which some took to symbolize the burden of communism on the Polish people. The historian John Lewis Gaddis identified the 1979 papal visit as the "trigger that led to communism's collapse worldwide" because of its profound effect on the morale of the Polish people.

The trade Union Solidarity emerged in Poland in 1980 under the leadership of Lech Wałęsa. The emergence of the Catholic anti-communist movement has been causally linked by many historians to Pope John Paul II's first papal visit to Poland in 1979. Indeed, John Paul II publicly defended the strikers and ordered the Polish Church to aid them in a message to Stefan Wyszyński, the archbishop of Warsaw and Gniezno. Most previous Polish revolutionary movements had been secular, but Solidarity centered on the religious symbols of the Christian cross, the rosary, and the Madonna.

In January 1981, Walesa visited Rome, met with the pope for the first time, and received his official recognition and support.

On May 13, 1981, in St. Peter's Square, John Paul II was shot four times, hitting him in the abdomen and his left hand, by would-be-assassin Mehmet Ali Agca. Many scholars have claimed that the assassination attempt was part of a conspiracy by the Soviet Union, but that theory has never been proved. If true, the assassination attempt would reveal Soviet fears of the Pope's influence in the Eastern Bloc and his assistance in the Polish Solidarity movement. However, the pope survived.

Initially, the Polish communists resisted the Solidarity rebels and imprisoned many of the movement's leaders between 1981 and 1983, but throughout the 1980s, the movement gained more power and thus more legitimacy. Consequently, in 1989, round-table talks were held between the leaders of Solidarity, the Soviet communists, and the Catholic Church. In 1990, Walesa was elected president of Poland and began large-scale capitalistic reforms. By 1992, Soviet troops had begun to leave Poland. That trend was paralleled by demonstrations and revolts in several other Soviet-controlled states.

There has been much speculation by historians about the relationship between Pope John Paul II and US President Ronald Reagan. Both leaders kept a regular letter correspondence and met in Rome in June 1982 and 1987. That interaction has caused many historians to believe that both leaders' cooperation strengthened the anticommunist cause. However, other historians, like George Weigel, have argued that both men were able to make their political achievements. According to that view, the United States, under the leadership of Reagan, presented an economic challenge to the Soviet Union, which was entirely independent of Vatican influence. Therefore, Reagan's role in the collapse of the Soviet economy may have been more influential than that of Pope John Paul II.

On December 1, 1989, the pope met with Soviet leader Mikhail Gorbachev. It was the first time a Catholic pope met with a Soviet leader. Both leaders agreed to establish diplomatic relations between the Vatican and the Soviet Union. Gorbachev also pledged to allow greater religious freedom within the Soviet Union. Many saw the meeting as a symbolic end to the philosophical conflict between the Soviet Union and the Vatican. It certainly showed a growing willingness on both sides to cooperate.

Even though the pope was primarily a religious leader, his leadership also had significant political consequences. John Paul II used his Polish identity and connections to bring about the collapse of the nation's socialist regime. While the intervention of John Paul II was undoubtedly an essential factor in the ending of communist rule in Poland, how significant the pope's leadership was in the rest of Eastern Europe and within the Soviet Union itself is less clear. The efforts of anti-communist leaders such as Pope John Paul II and US President Ronald Reagan did not make the fall of the Soviet Union inevitable. However, both leaders hastened the end of the Cold War and the fall of communism, particularly in Eastern Europe.

== See also ==
- Index of Vatican City-related articles
- Michel d'Herbigny S.J.
- Holy See–Russia relations
- Religion in the Soviet Union
- Persecution of Christians in the Soviet Union
- Persecution of Christians in Warsaw Pact countries
- Ukrainian Greek Catholic Church in the Soviet Union
- Chronicle of the Catholic Church in Lithuania
- Catholicism and socialism
