= Concordat of 1933 =

1933 concordat between Austria and the Vatican

The Concordat of 1933 is a concordat which regulates the church–state relation in Austria, with particular emphasis on Catholic schools and religious education. It has since been supplemented by further agreements, such as one concerning schools.

The concordat was negotiated by Cardinal Eugenio Pacelli (later pope Pius XII) for the Holy See and Chancellor Engelbert Dollfuss with his Foreign Minister, Kurt Schuschnigg, for Austria. It was signed on 5 July 1933 and came into force on 1 May 1934. The concordat was essentially incorporated into the new constitution by which the Catholic Church, through the "Christian corporative state" (Ständestaat) greatly increased its influence, especially in regard to schools, marriage laws and Church appointments. After the Anschluss in 1938 the concordat was out of force until the end of World War II. There followed a long controversy about its validity until it was officially recognised by the Austrian Government in 1957.

As with other concordats negotiated by Pacelli, it involves the state's acceptance of the 1917 Code of Canon Law, of which he was the main architect. The Code gave the Holy See control over the appointment of bishops and other prelates, and ensured that it had the final word in matters of Church policy and doctrine. This is reflected in the provisions of the Austrian concordat. Like the Reichskonkordat, which Pacelli also negotiated, the Austrian one contains a Secret Supplement.
