= Concordat of 1953 =

1953 concordat between Spain and the Vatican

The Concordat of 1953 was the last classic concordat of the Catholic Church, signed on 27 August 1953 by Spain (under the rule of Francisco Franco) with the Vatican (during the pontificate of Pope Pius XII). Together with the Pact of Madrid, signed the same year, it was a significant effort to break Spain's international isolation after World War II.

In return for the granting by the Vatican of the "royal patronage" (Patronato real, the historical privilege of Spanish kings to appoint clerical figures) to Franco, the concordat gave the Catholic Church in Spain a set of privileges such as state funding and exemption from government taxation.

The Concordat of 1953 superseded the Concordat of 1851 between Pope Pius IX and Queen Isabella II and Franco's 1941 Convention with the Vatican.

== Background ==
The First Carlist War (1833-1840) between Liberals and Carlists saw a spike of anti-clerical policies, culminating in the seizing of Church property and the closure of religious houses. Relations between Church and State were restored by the Concordat of 1851 between the government of Queen Isabella II and the Vatican, under the pontificate of Pope Pius IX, which restored Catholicism as the State religion.

Following the fall of the monarchy in 1931, the Second Spanish Republic unilaterally abrogated the Concordat and enacted a series of harsh anti-clerical measures. The Spanish Civil War (1936-1939) ended the Republic and replaced it with the autocratic Spanish State, under the leadership of Generalissimo Francisco Franco. Franco's political system was virtually the antithesis of the final government of the Republic, the Popular Front. In the early years of the Francoist regime, Church and State had a close and mutually beneficial association, the so-called National Catholicism.

Franco had wanted a full concordat with royal rights of patronage, the right to choose bishops. The Vatican, uncertain of his future, compromised by offering him a less official "convention", signed on 7 June 1941, and gave him only a limited role in choosing bishops. Years after World War II, the terms of the Convention of 1941 were formalized in Article 7 of the Concordat of 1953.

In contrast to the anticlericalism of the Popular Front, the Francoist regime established policies that were highly favorable to the Catholic Church, which was restored to its previous status as the official religion of Spain. In addition to receiving government subsidies, the Church regained its dominant position in the education system, and laws conformed to Catholic dogma.

During the Francoist regime, Catholicism was the only religion to have legal status; other worship services could not be advertised, and the Catholic Church was the only religious institution that was permitted to own property or publish books. The government not only continued to pay priests' salaries and to subsidize the Church but it also assisted in the reconstruction of church buildings damaged by the war. Laws were passed abolishing divorce and banning the sale of contraceptives. Catholic religious instruction was mandatory, even in state schools.

In return for granting the Catholic Church these privileges, Franco obtained the right to name Catholic bishops in Spain, as well as veto power over appointments of clergy down to the parish priest level.

== Terms ==
In 1953 this close cooperation was formalized in a new Concordat with the Vatican, which granted the church an extraordinary set of privileges:

- mandatory canonical marriages for all Catholics;
- exemption from government taxation;
- subsidies for new building construction;
- censorship of materials the church deemed offensive;
- the right to establish universities;
- the right to operate radio stations, and to publish newspapers and magazines;
- sanctuary from police intrusion into church properties; and
- exemption of clergy from military service.

There were later conflicts about the terms. The police argued that its violation of sanctuary was excused as "urgent need". The Church extended, however, this sanctuary to the premises of Catholic Action and other catholic associations.

== Aftermath ==
Following the election of Pope John XXIII in 1958 and the Second Vatican Council (1962-1965), the relationship between the Catholic Church and Franco began to deteriorate: this became apparent during the reign of Pope Paul VI (1963-1978). In 1968, the Pope asked Franco to surrender the right to put forward candidates for episcopal ordination, but the Generalissimo refused, citing his own moral obligation to provide for the moral welfare of his country. As the opposition to the regime increased among the priests, from 1968 the dissidents were jailed at the Concordat Prison of Zamora.

With the death of Franco in 1975 and Spain's subsequent transition to democracy, the Concordat was changed and amended several times. In 1976, a convention between the Spanish government and the Holy See abolished the right to nominate bishops for the Spanish head of state. In 1978, the new democratic constitution that brought Francoism to a final end established the principle of religious neutrality (aconfesionalidad) of the Spanish state and the complete freedom of religion for its citizens. In 1979, another convention between the Spanish government and the Holy See changed the law regarding financial aspects and pub lic subsidies for the Catholic church.

== See also ==
- National Catholicism
- Holy See–Spain relations
- Relations between the Catholic Church and the state
- Lateran Treaty, 1929 treaty between the Holy See and Fascist Italy
- Reichskonkordat, 1933 treaty between the Holy See and Nazi Germany
