= 1847 Agreement between the Holy See and Russia =

1847 treaty between the Holy See and the Russian Empire

The 1847 Agreement between the Holy See and the Russian Empire was a diplomatic arrangement (in Italian, accomodamento) entered into on 3 August of that year. The agreement involved the Russia government's nomination of Catholic bishops in Russia.

== Background ==
The Russian Empire acquired large Catholic-inhabited territories of the former Polish–Lithuanian Commonwealth after the Third Partition in 1795; there were also Catholic communities among the Armenians. In Orthodox Russia, Catholics experienced discrimination and persecution: Russification was enforced, together with efforts to separate priests and faithful from their Church. Vatican relations with Russia were always difficult because of the rivalry between the Catholic Church and the Eastern Orthodox Church.

Upon his election to the papacy, Pope Pius IX (1846–1878) inherited the difficult relations with Russia from his predecessor Pope Gregory XVI. The Catholic Church was severely limited in its possibilities within Russia. The Pope appointed Cardinal Luigi Lambruschini to begin negotiations with Tsar Nicholas I of Russia with the aim of establishing better relations and increased freedom of action. Russia rejected the term "concordat" with the Pope as a name for the agreement.

== Agreement ==
The agreement, which included 37 articles, allowed the Church to confirm the dioceses in Russia proper and create a new diocese (Diocese of Cherson) in southern Russia and the Caucasus. New seminaries were established and the Russian Empire guaranteed the financing for Church activities in an agreed upon sum of 104,480 rubles annually. Bishops were to be appointed by mutual agreement between the Vatican and the Tsar. They were authorized to preside over ecclesiastical courts and determine seminary education. Bishops could not intervene in marital or economic matters, which were to be determined by diocesan consistories consisting of several Catholic priests. The agreement of the State authorities was required for the appointment of Catholic parish priests. Their salaries were to be paid by the parishes or, if these were unable, by the Russian state.

Between 1847 and 1866, the Holy See complained several times that the Tsarist government interfered in seminary education and ecclesiastical affairs. At last in 1866, the insult committed against Pope by the Ambassador of Russia to the Holy See brought about the rupture of the diplomatic relations between the Vatican and Saint Petersburg. Pope Leo XIII renewed the relations by the convention of December 1882.
