= Treaty of Speyer (1209) =

1209 treaty

The Treaty of Speyer was signed in 1209 by Holy Roman Emperor Otto IV. This agreement was developed as a result of Pope Innocent III having launched an appeal for organizing a crusade against the Cathars (or Albigensians) in southern France. The accord allowed Emperor Otto IV to renounce the Concordat of Worms and claim authority over territories controlled by the Pope. These territories included the Kingdom of Sicily.

== See also ==
- List of treaties
