= Concordat of 1928 =

1928 concordat between Colombia and the Vatican

The Concordat of 1928 was signed between the Colombian government and the Vatican on 5 May 1928. The concordat was registered in the League of Nations Treaty Series on 3 August 1928.

== Terms of the agreement ==
- Article 1: The Colombian government undertook to facilitate the continued operation of Catholic Missions in Colombia.
- Article 2: Specified the Ecclesiastical districts in Colombia.
- Article 3: Provided an appendix to the agreement to specify the boundaries of the Ecclesiastical districts.
- Article 4: Provided for the establishment of stations on the borders with Venezuela, Brazil, Peru, and Ecuador.
- Article 5: Provided for government financial support of missions sent to the Native American tribes in Colombia.
- Articles 6-8: Specified the funds to be allocated to maintain the missions.
- Article 9: Placed the Catholic school system under the supervision of the missions.
- Article 10: The Colombian government undertook to provide the missions with the land needed for their operation.
- Article 11: Obliged heads of missions to submit to the Papal Nuncio annual reports about their finances, and these reports must be delivered both to the Vatican and the Colombian government.
- Article 12: The Colombian government undertook not to appoint in the areas where Native American tribes resided any local officials hostile to the Catholic church.
- Article 13: Obliged heads of mission to use their influence on Native American converts to promote government development plans on their lands.
- Article 14: Granted mission officials the same legal status as other clergies.
- Article 15: Obliged heads of missions to appoint legal representatives to deal with legal matters.
- Article 16: Stipulated that the agreement shall remain in force for 25 years.

== See also ==
- Gustavo de Greiff#Problems with the Church
- Roman Catholicism in Colombia
