= Concordat of 1851 =

1851 Concordat between the Spain and the Vatican

The Concordat of 1851 was a concordat between the Spanish government of Queen Isabella II and the Vatican. It was negotiated in response to the policies of the anticlerical Liberal government, which had forced her mother out as regent in 1841. Although the concordat was signed on 16 March 1851, its terms were not implemented until 1855. (A second concordat was negotiated in 1859, as a supplement to the Concordat of 1851.)

The concordat remained in effect until it was repudiated by the Second Spanish Republic in 1931. Ten years later, the first three articles were reinstated by Generalissimo Francisco Franco's 1941 Convention with the Vatican. Eventually, a new concordat was signed in 1953.

== Context ==
From 1833 to 1840, civil war raged in Spain over the succession to King Ferdinand VII, who had ruled under the liberal Constitution of 1812 until it was abolished in May 1814. After Ferdinand's death in 1833, the constitution was in force again briefly in 1836 and 1837. The Carlist Wars were fought between supporters of the regent, Maria Christina, acting for her daughter, Isabel II of Spain, and those of the late king's brother, Carlos de Borbón (styling himself Carlos V), who hoped for the return to an absolute monarchy.

"The first Carlist war was fought not so much on the basis of the legal claim of Don Carlos, but because a passionate, dedicated section of the Spanish people favored a return to a kind of absolute monarchy that they felt would protect their individual freedoms (fueros), their regional individuality and their religious conservatism." Aided by the United Kingdom, France and Portugal, the supporters of Isabel were ultimately able to compel the Carlists to come to terms.

=== Relations with the Catholic Church ===
Most of the clergy did not support Carlos but were not in favor of many of the reforms. When priests who were found with the rebels were shot, that turned a number of bishops against the government, which then viewed the clergy as disloyal. A period of fierce anticlericalism followed. Rome delayed recognition of the government and the appointment of any new bishops (subject to government approval) until it knew with which government it would be dealing. Isabella's government viewed that as a grave insult. In the summer of 1834, Liberal (Isabeline) forces set fire to the Sanctuary of Arantzazu and a convent of Bera.

Some bishops were in prison and others in exile. As the government was in grave need of money, church property was seized and religious houses closed. Some larger convents, whose work involved teaching and nursing, remained open until 1837.

The situation had largely stabilised by the late 1840s. A Spanish force assisted Pope Pius IX at Gaeta after his flight from the short-lived revolutionary Roman Republic in November 1848. Despite their anticlericalism, the Moderates concluded a rapprochement with the Church, which agreed to surrender its claim to the confiscated property in return for official recognition by the state and a role in education. That, however, did not win the Moderates conservative rural support.

== Terms ==
According to the Concordat, "The Apostolic Roman Catholic Church, to the exclusion of all other religions, will continue to be the only religion of Spain, always protected in the dominions of His Catholic Majesty and enjoying all rights and prerogatives according to God's law and regulated by the sacred canon".

The concordat addressed the protection of episcopal rights, changed the boundaries of dioceses and regulated the affairs of territories dependent on military orders, ecclesiastical jurisdiction, and the constitution of chapters, benefices, the right of the Church to acquire property and the right of the monarch to appoint to ecclesiastical offices. The right of presentation to certain of the latter was reserved to the Pope; others were left to the queen.

A second concordat was signed 25 November 1859, as a supplement to the Concordat of 1851.

=== Education ===
Education in all the colleges, universities etc. was mandated to conform to Catholic doctrine, and it was promised that the bishops, "whose duty it is to watch over the education of youth in regard to morals and faith", would meet no obstacle in the performance of that duty.

=== Rights of clergy and religious orders ===
The bishops and the clergy under them were to enjoy the same rights in all else that regards their functions, especially concerning the sacred office of ordination. The government agreed to assure the respect due to them and to lend its aid "notably in preventing the publication, introduction or circulation of immoral and harmful books".

Religious orders of men or women, which to contemplation added some work of charity or public utility (education, care of the sick, missions etc.) were retained or re-established. The Spanish government agreed to pay the salaries of bishops and priests. In addition, it agreed to provide an income to churches and seminaries. However, that provision was never implemented.

=== Church property ===
The right of the church to own and acquire new property was recognised. As to property that it had been previously despoiled, whatever property had not been alienated was to be restored, but whatever the state had taken could be sold, and the price invested in government bonds for the benefit of the rightful owner. The Holy See renounced its right to property that had already been alienated. With regard to unforeseen points, the concordat referenced the canons and the discipline of the Catholic Church.

== Sources ==
- De Bourge, Gaston. “Concordat”, Dictionnaire de l’économie politique, 1852, (John J. Lalor,, ed.) Cyclopædia of Political Science, Political Economy, and the Political History of the United States by the Best American and European Writers, (New York: Maynard, Merrill, and Co., 1899. First published: 1881.)
