= Treaty of 2004 =

The Treaty Between the Slovak Republic and the Holy See on Catholic Education is a treaty between the Slovak Republic and the Holy See about Catholic upbringing and education.

This treaty, or concordat, secured full state funding for Church-controlled schools and Catholic religious education. It was signed between the Holy See and Slovakia on 13 May 2004 and came into effect on 9 July 2004.

== Bibliography ==
- Concordat Watch - Slovakia
