= Concordat of 1993 =

International agreement between Holy See and Poland

Concordat between the Holy See and the Republic of Poland, signed in Warsaw on 28 July 1993
- Type: Concordat
- Signed: 28 July 1993
- Location: Warsaw, Poland
- Ratified: 23 February 1998
- Effective: 25 April 1998
- Condition: One month after instruments of ratification were exchanged
- Signatories: (Holy See) Józef Kowalczyk; (Poland) Krzysztof Skubiszewski
- Parties: Holy See; Poland
- Ratifiers: (Holy See) John Paul II; (Poland) Aleksander Kwaśniewski
- Citations: Dz.U. 1998 nr 51 poz. 318
- Languages: Italian; Polish

The Concordat of 1993 is an international agreement between the Holy See of the Catholic Church and the Republic of Poland. It was signed on 28 July 1993 in Warsaw by Archbishop Józef Kowalczyk, Apostolic Nuncio to Poland, and Krzysztof Skubiszewski, Poland’s Minister of Foreign Affairs.

Ratification of the concordat was delayed for more than four years. The Sejm, elected in 1993, did not approve the ratification during its term. The approval was ultimately passed on 8 January 1998 by the new parliament elected in 1997. President Aleksander Kwaśniewski and Pope John Paul II both ratified the treaty on 23 February 1998, and the instruments of ratification were exchanged on 25 March 1998 in Vatican City.

The concordat came into force one month later, on 25 April 1998.

== See also ==
- Holy See–Poland relations
