= Concordat of 2008 =

Agreement on the Juridical Statute of the Catholic Church and its Ecclesiastical Institutions in Brazil
- Type: Concordat
- Context: Relations between the Catholic Church and the Federative Republic of Brazil
- Signed: November 13, 2008
- Location: Vatican City
- Ratified: October 7, 2009
- Signatories: Archbishop Dominique Mamberti (for the Holy See), Celso Amorim (for Brazil)
- Parties: Catholic Church; Federative Republic of Brazil
- Ratifiers: Brazil, Holy See
- Language: Portuguese

The Concordat of 2008 was an agreement between the Catholic Church and Brazil, signed in the Vatican in the presence of the President of Brazil, Luiz da Silva on 13 November 2008. Some congressmen wanted to change the concordat, however, as with any other international treaty, once it had been signed, it could not be modified by Brazil without Vatican approval, only accepted or rejected as a whole. After much controversy it was ratified on 7 October 2009. The Association of Brazilian Magistrates opposed the concordat, as did some congressmen and Protestant groups. They objected that Brazil's constitution enshrines separation of church and state and forbids the creation of "distinctions between Brazilians or preferences favoring some". An atheist spokesman called the concordat "an instrument of evangelization at the expense of the state and all Brazilian citizens". The Catholic Bishops, however, denied that there was any conflict between the concordat and the constitution.

It was the clause on religious instruction that aroused the greatest controversy. Instead of non-sectarian religious education regulated by the educational authorities, which was laid down by the Education Act (LDB), Article 11 of the concordat permits the introduction into state schools of Catholic catechism under the control of the Church. This encountered opposition because Brazil has a diverse religious landscape, which includes not only the major world religions, but also Afro-Brazilian ones like Candomblé and the indigenous religions of the Amazon rainforest. The Ministry of Education feared that introduction of sectarian religious instruction in state schools could jeopardize the Brazilian policy of religious inclusiveness.

== See also ==
- Religion in Brazil
