= Pope Alexander III =

Head of the Catholic Church from 1159 to 1181

- Bishop of Rome
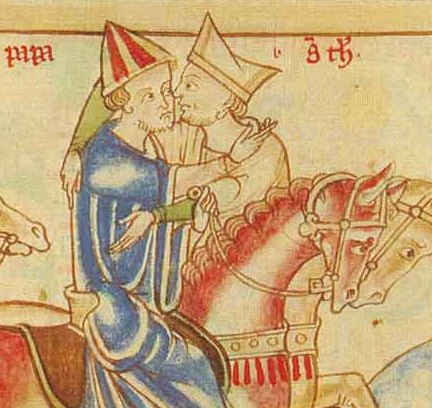
- Alexander III bidding farewell to Thomas Becket (13th century miniature attributed to Matthew Paris, British Library)
- Church: Catholic Church
- Papacy began: 7 September 1159
- Papacy ended: 30 August 1181
- Predecessor: Adrian IV
- Successor: Lucius III
- Previous posts: Cardinal-Deacon of Santi Cosma e Damiano (1150–51); Cardinal-Priest of San Marco (1151–59)

Orders
- Consecration: 20 September 1159 by Ubaldo Allucingoli
- Created cardinal: October 1150 by Eugene III

Personal details
- Born: Rolando c. 1100–05 Siena, March of Tuscany, Holy Roman Empire
- Died: 30 August 1181 Civita Castellana, Papal States

Pope Alexander III (c. 1100/1105 – 30 August 1181), born Roland (Italian: Rolando), was head of the Catholic Church and ruler of the Papal States from 7 September 1159 until his death in 1181.

A native of Siena, Alexander became pope after a contested election, but had to spend much of his pontificate outside Rome while several rivals, supported by Holy Roman Emperor Frederick I Barbarossa, claimed the papacy. Alexander rejected Byzantine Emperor Manuel I Komnenos' offer to end the East–West Schism, sanctioned the Northern Crusades, and held the Third Council of the Lateran. He canonized Thomas Becket and Bernard of Clairvaux. The city of Alessandria in Piedmont is named after him.

== Early life and career ==
Rolando was born in Siena. From the 14th century, he was referred to as a member of the aristocratic family of Bandinelli, although this has not been proven. He was long thought to be the 12th-century canon lawyer and theologian Master Roland of Bologna, who composed the "Stroma" or "Summa Rolandi"—one of the earliest commentaries on the Decretum of Gratian—and the "Sententiae Rolandi", a sentence collection displaying the influence of Pierre Abélard, but John T. Noonan and Rudolf Weigand have shown this to be another Rolandus.

Rolando probably studied at Bologna, where Robert of Torigni notes that he taught theology. In October 1150, Pope Eugene III created him Cardinal-Deacon of Santi Cosma e Damiano. Later he became Cardinal-Priest of St Mark. In 1153, he became papal chancellor and was the leader of the cardinals opposed to Emperor Frederick I Barbarossa. In 1156, he negotiated the Treaty of Benevento, which restored peaceful relations between Rome and the Kingdom of Sicily. At the diet of Besançon in October 1157, he and Cardinal Bernard of San Clemente delivered a papal message that seemed to claim that Frederick I was a papal vassal, resulting in a serious diplomatic incident.

== Disputed election ==
Pope Adrian IV died on 1 September 1159. On 7 September 1159, Rolando Bandinelli was elected pope and took the name Alexander III. A minority of the cardinals, however, elected the cardinal priest Octavian, who assumed the name of Victor IV and became Frederick's antipope.

By 1160, faced with a papal schism, Alexander and Victor were summoned by Emperor Frederick to a council in Pavia. Alexander refused, stating a pope can only be judged by God. The council of Pavia met from 5 to 11 February and recognized Victor IV's election as pope. On 13 February, Victor IV excommunicated Alexander. Upon receiving the news on 24 March 1160, Alexander, who was at Anagni, excommunicated both Victor and Frederick.

In 1161, King Géza II of Hungary signed an agreement and recognised Alexander III as the rightful pope and declared that the supreme spiritual leader was the only one who could exercise the rite of investiture. This meant that Alexander's legitimacy was gaining strength, as soon proved by the fact that other monarchs, such as the king of France and King Henry II of England, recognized his authority. Because of imperial strength in Italy, Alexander was forced to reside outside Rome for a large part of his pontificate. When news reached him of the death of Victor in 1164, he openly wept and scolded the cardinals in his company for rejoicing at the end of the rival antipope.

However, the dispute between Alexander III, Victor IV and Victor's successors Paschal III and Calixtus III (who had the German imperial support) continued until Frederick Barbarossa's defeat at the Legnano in 1176, after which Barbarossa finally (in the Peace of Venice of 1177) recognized Alexander III as pope. On 12 March 1178, Alexander III returned to Rome, which he had been compelled to leave twice: the first time between 1162 and 23 November 1165. When Alexander was arrested by supporters of the imperialist Victor IV, he was freed by Oddone Frangipane, who sent him to safety in the Campania. Alexander again left Rome in 1167, travelling first to Benevento and later moving to various strongholds such as those of Anagni, Palestrina, Ferentino, Tusculum, and Veroli.

== Pontificate ==
=== Politics ===
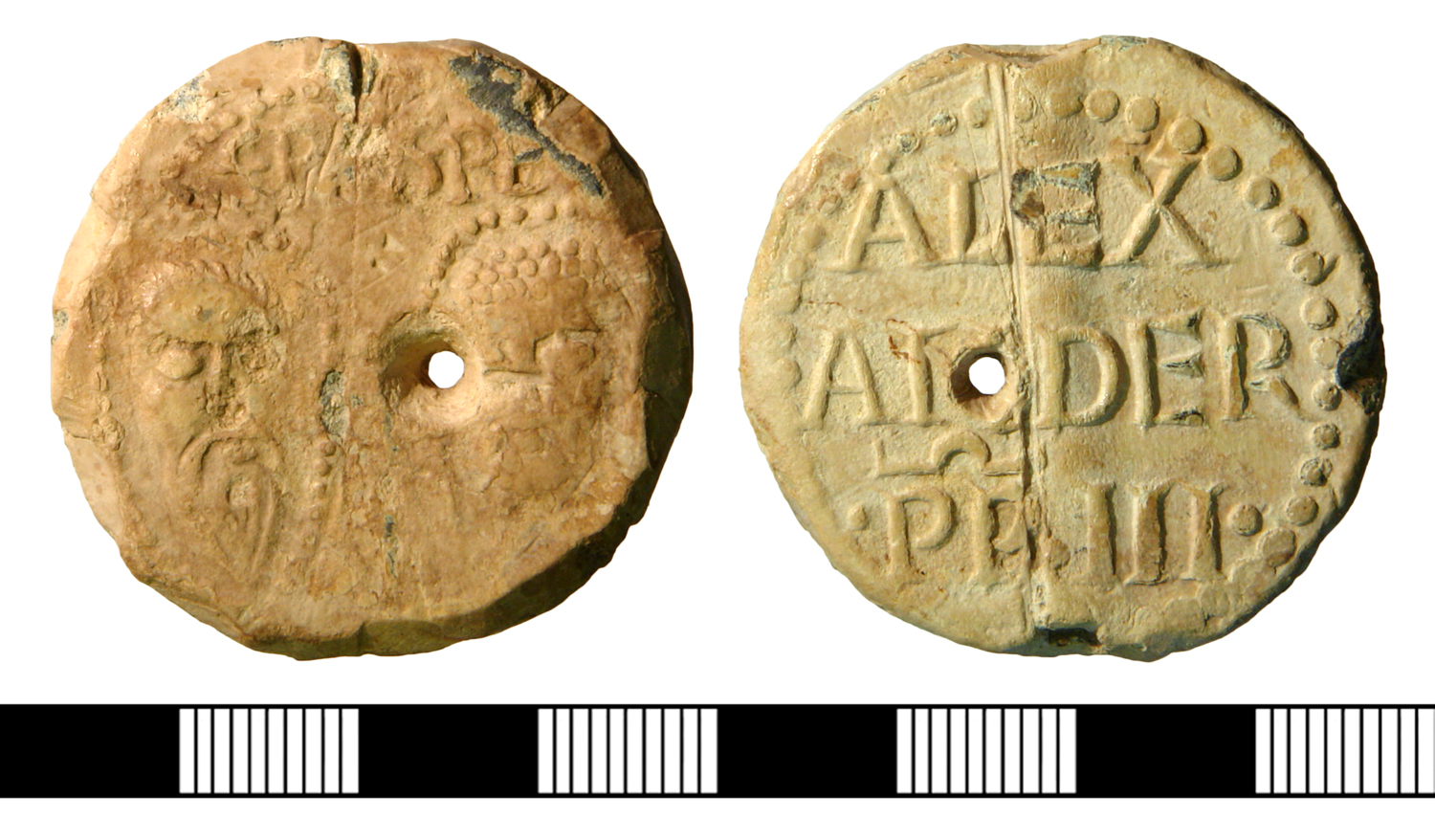
Bulla of Alexander III

Alexander III was the first pope known to have paid direct attention to missionary activities east of the Baltic Sea. He had created the Archbishopric of Uppsala in Sweden in 1164, probably at the suggestion of his close friend Archbishop Eskil of Lund – exiled in Clairvaux, France, due to a conflict with the Danish king. The latter appointed a Benedictine monk Fulco as a bishop in Estonia. In 1171, Alexander became the first pope to address the situation of the Church in Finland, with Finns allegedly harassing priests and only relying on God in time of war. In the bull Non parum animus noster, in 1171 or 1172, he gave papal sanction to ongoing crusades against pagans in northern Europe, promising remission of sin for those who fought there. In doing so, he legitimized the widespread use of forced conversion as a tactic by those fighting in the Baltic.

In 1166, Alexander received an embassy from the Byzantine emperor Manuel I. The Byzantine ambassador, the sebastos Jordan relayed that Manuel would end the Great Schism of the eastern and western churches if Alexander would recognize him as emperor. As emperor, Manuel would supply the pope with men and money to restore his authority in Italy. Alexander gave an evasive answer, but in 1168 he rejected outright the same proposal from a second Byzantine embassy. His stated reason amounted to it being too difficult. He appears to have feared Byzantine domination of Italy if the pope owed his position to its support.

Besides checkmating Barbarossa, Alexander humbled King Henry II of England for the murder of Thomas Becket in 1170, to whom he was unusually close, later canonizing Becket in 1173. This was the second English saint canonized by Alexander, the first being Edward the Confessor in 1161. Nonetheless, he confirmed the position of Henry as Lord of Ireland in 1172.

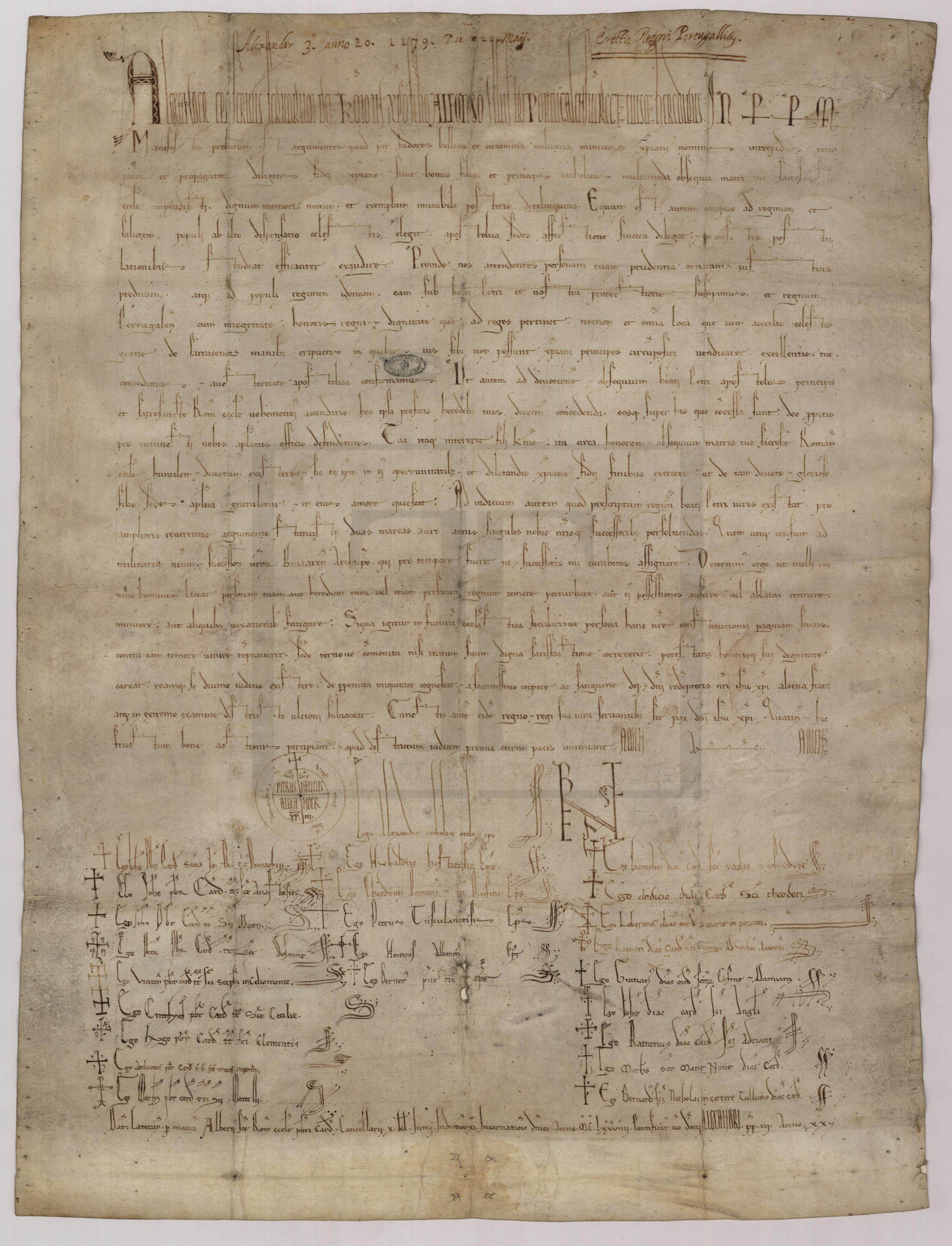
Manifestis Probatum.

Through the papal bull Manifestis Probatum, issued on 23 May 1179, Alexander recognized the right of Count Afonso Henriques to proclaim himself king of Portugal – an important step in the process of Portugal becoming a recognized independent kingdom. Afonso had been using the title of king since 1139.

=== Efforts at reform ===
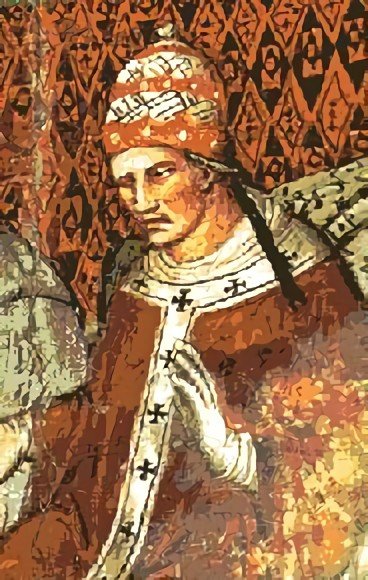
Alexander III depicted in a fresco by Spinello Aretino (before 1410, Palazzo Pubblico in Siena)

Even as a fugitive, Alexander enjoyed the favour and protection of Louis VII of France.

In 1163 Alexander summoned clergy and prelates from England, France, Italy, and Spain to the Council of Tours to address, among other things, the unlawful division of ecclesiastical benefices, clerical usury, and lay possession of tithes.

In March 1179, Alexander held the Third Council of the Lateran, one of the most important mediaeval church councils, reckoned by the Catholic Church as the eleventh ecumenical council. Its acts embodied several of the Pope's proposals for the betterment of the condition of the Church, among them the law requiring that no one could be elected pope without the votes of two-thirds of the cardinals. The rule was altered slightly in 1996, but was restored in 2007. The period from 1177, which saw the submission of both Emperor Frederick and anti-pope Calixtus III, and this synod/council marked the summit of Alexander III's power.

Nevertheless, soon after the close of the synod, the Roman Republic forced Alexander to leave the city, which he never re-entered, and on 29 September 1179, some nobles set up the Antipope Innocent III. By the judicious use of money, however, Alexander got him into his power, so that he was deposed in January 1180. In 1181, Alexander excommunicated King William I of Scotland and put the kingdom under an interdict.

=== Ecclesial activities ===
Throughout his pontificate, Alexander elevated 68 cardinals in fifteen consistories, which included two of his successors, Urban III and Clement III, and a cardinal whom he would later canonize as a saint.

Alexander beatified no one during his papacy, but he did canonize ten saints, which included notable figures of the age such as Bernard of Clairvaux, Thomas Becket, and King Edward the Confessor

=== Death ===
Alexander died at Civita Castellana on 30 August 1181. It was one week short of twenty-two years since his election, the longest papacy since Adrian I in the 8th century.

== Sources ==
- Christiansen, Eric (1997). The Northern Crusades. London: Penguin Books. p. 71. ISBN 978-0140266535.
- Duggan, Anne J. (2016). "Alexander ille meus: The Papacy of Alexander III". In Duggan, Anne J.; Clarke, Peter D. (eds.). Pope Alexander III (1159–81): The Art of Survival. Routledge. pp. 13–50.
- Freed, John (2016). Frederick Barbarossa: The Prince and the Myth. Yale University Press.
- Fonnesberg-Schmidt, Iben (2007). The Popes and the Baltic Crusades: 1147-1254. Brill. p. 58.
- Hamilton, Bernard (2000). The Leper King and His Heirs: Baldwin IV and the Crusader Kingdom of Jerusalem. Cambridge University Press. ISBN 9781316347638.
- Logan, F Donald (2002). A History of the Church in the Middle Ages. Routledge.
- Morris, Colin (1989). The Papal Monarchy: The Western Church from 1050 to 1250. Oxford University Press.
- Suger (2018). Selected Works of Abbot Suger of Saint Denis. Translated by Cusimano, Richard; Whitmore, Eric. The Catholic University of America Press.

Catholic Church titles
Preceded by Adrian IV	Pope; 1159–1181	Succeeded by Lucius III
