= Saeculo exeunte octavo =

1940 papal encyclical by Pius XII

Saeculo exeunte octavo Encyclical of Pope Pius XII
- Signature date: 13 June 1940
- Subject: On the Eighth Century of the Independence of Portugal
- Number: 3 of 41 of the pontificate
- Text: In Latin; In English

Saeculo exeunte octavo is an encyclical of Pope Pius XII in which he honors Portugal at the celebration of its 800th anniversary. A large part of the encyclical deals with the missionary activities of Portugal and the need to modernize missionary work. It was given in Rome, June 13, 1940, in the second year of his pontificate.

== Summary ==
The Pontiff reviews Portuguese history, mentioning among others explorers like Henry the Navigator and Vasco da Gama, who took missionaries along while making discoveries: Their illustrious example greatly inspired the Catholic world, including the spirited citizens of your fatherland, to promote more widely the works of the apostolate. Afonso de Albuquerque and João de Castro governed the Portuguese colonies, giving protection and assistance to the Catholic missionaries. But now there is a shortage of missionary priests especially in Africa. The pope recommends missionary societies such as the Portuguese Society for the Promotion of the Catholic Foreign Missions, in order to improve the quality of preparation and training and interaction among clergy in missions. The selection of decent candidates is of special concern to Pius XII, who suggests that only persons with perfect character aptitudes should be sent. He appeals to the people of Portugal, to support their missionaries generously. He entrusts them and all of Portugal to the protection of Our Lady of Fátima, who, as Pius XII said in a radio address, may have aided in keeping Portugal out of World War II.

== Significance ==
World War II meant drastic reductions in Catholic missionary activities, as nationals from belligerent nations were either interned or expelled in Africa and Asia. Portugal was a neutral country and its missionaries could work relatively free from political reprisals. Therefore, Pius XII turned to Portugal in 1940, as one of the few Catholic countries which could help limit the consequences of the war in the missions.

== See also ==
- List of encyclicals of Pope Pius XII
