= Treaty of Ceprano (1080) =

1080 treaty between the Pope and the Normans

The Treaty of Ceprano was signed on June 29, 1080, between Pope Gregory VII and the Normans. Based on the terms of the accord, the Pope established an alliance with Robert Guiscard and recognized his conquests.

== See also ==
- List of treaties
