= Treaties between the Republic of Croatia and the Holy See =

Treaties between the government of Croatia and the Holy See

The Government of Croatia and the Holy See have signed four bilateral agreements (also known as concordats or The Vatican agreements) and a protocol. Although the agreements proved controversial owing to great one-time and continuous financial and other burdens the agreements put on the Croatian state (relative to the Croatian government budget), no government of Croatia ever attempted to amend them. From the perspective of international law, these agreements may be seen as unjust to Croatia because of putting obligations chiefly on the Croatian state, but not on the Holy See.

A 2012 analysis concludes that the Croatian state has to give about 1000 million HRK annually to the Catholic church. Another analysis counts 8670 million HRK as the minimal possible amount that the Church got from the Croatian government budget from 1996 to the end of 2013.

Because of the principles of religious equality in the Croatian Constitution, the agreements between the Republic of Croatia and the Holy See resulted in comparable benefits being given to some other religious organizations, too. The budget for support to religious communities in the 2017 government budget was 300 million HRK.

== Description ==
These treaties are distinct from but related with the contracts between the Croatian government and the Croatian Bishops' Conference (HBK - Hrvatska Biskupska Konferencija in Croatian), the governing body of the Catholic church in Croatia. The treaties especially "The agreement between the Holy See and the Republic of Croatia on cooperation in areas of upbringing and culture" and "The agreement between the Holy See and the Republic of Croatia on economic matters" left issues for further agreement between the Government and HBK.

The concordats were challenged on constitutional grounds, but the Constitutional Court of Croatia judged itself unable to rule on matters of international law. Although the treaties arguably conflict with the Croatian Constitution, they are unenforceable, as they only specify that disputes will be resolved through negotiation.

== Agreements ==
On 18 December 1996 the following three agreements were signed between the Holy See and the Republic of Croatia:

=== Care of the spiritual needs of Catholic believers and members of the armed and police forces ===
Officially known in Croatian as "Ugovor između Svete Stolice i Republike Hrvatske o dušobrižništvu katoličkih vjernika, pripadnika oružanih snaga i redarstvenih službi Republike Hrvatske", this concordat obliges the Croatian state to integrate institutions of Catholic military chaplaincy in the Croatian military. It was ratified by the Croatian Parliament on 24 January 1997.

=== Cooperation in areas of upbringing and culture ===
Its name in Croatian is "Ugovor između Svete Stolice i Republike Hrvatske o suradnji na području odgoja i kulture" and it was ratified by the Croatian Parliament on 24 January 1997. The agreement sets up Catholic religious education as a subject in all schools in Croatia and enables the Catholic church in Croatia to found and run official schools and institutions of higher education with state financing. Catholic institutions of higher education should by the agreement have the power to award academic and professional grades and degrees recognised under Croatian law. About 300 million HRK is spent per year on teachers of religious education.

=== Legal matters ===
Known in Croatian as "Ugovor između Svete Stolice i Republike Hrvatske o pravnim pitanjima", it was ratified by the Croatian Parliament on 7 February 1997.

- It obliges the Croatian courts to notify Church authorities before investigating clerics for felonies,
- gives the priest-penitent privilege (meaning the courts are forbidden from inquiring into confessional communication between priest and penitent),
- gives local bishops the authority to veto church building plans,
- guarantees the Church access to state television programming, etc.

=== Economic matters ===
Another agreement, called "Ugovor između Svete Stolice i Republike Hrvatske o gospodarskim pitanjima", was signed on 9 October 1998 and ratified on 4 December 1998.

- Donations to the Church must be tax-free.
- The Church will be returned all property that was taken from it during Communist Yugoslavia, or, if returning the property is not possible, the Church will be recompensated for that property.
- The Church will be given an annual (monetary) amount based on the number of parishes.
- The Church will be treated as a charitable organization tax-wise.

== Opposition to the Treaties within Croatia ==
Ivan Grubišić, a Catholic priest and a member of the Croatian Parliament fought for termination or revision of the Treaties, which were deemed to unbalance the relations between the Church and the Croatian state.

== See also ==
- Catholic Church in Croatia
- Concordat
- Croatia–Holy See relations
- Memorandum of understanding
- Relations between the Catholic Church and the state
