= Concordat of 2004 =

The Concordat of 2004 is an agreement between Portugal and the Holy See of the Roman Catholic Church. The concordat was signed on 18 May 2004 by Angelo Sodano, Cardinal Secretary of State, for the Holy See and José Manuel Durão Barroso, Prime Minister of Portugal, for the Portuguese Republic. It has 33 articles, and supersedes the Concordat of 1940, renewing the relations between the Catholic Church and Portugal, redefining the status of this religion in Portugal. Its articles refer to aspects like religious holidays, religious marriage, organization of the Church, fiscal rights, freedom of religion, annulments, and Catholic education.
