= Concordat of the Forty Articles =

1289 agreement between the Kingdom of Portugal and the Holy See

The Concordat of the Forty Articles (Portuguese: Concordata dos Quarenta Artigos) was an agreement reached in 1289 between the Kingdom of Portugal and the Holy See. Signed by King Denis and Pope Nicholas IV, it ended a conflict between the Portuguese monarchy and the Papacy that had begun in 1267 under Denis's father, Afonso III. The dispute had led to the excommunication of both kings.
