= Princes' Concordat =

The Princes' Concordat (German: Fürsten-Konkordat) was an agreement concluded in January 1447 between Pope Eugenius IV and the prince-electors of the Holy Roman Empire. It outlined generous concessions on the part of the Pope, particularly covering the appointment of Church positions, in exchange for the support of the German princes.

== Terms ==
In the concordat, which is a term used for a treaty between the popes and secular powers, Eugenius IV agreed to acknowledge the Basle decrees and the position of the General Council as superior to the Pope's person in religious matters. It also restored the Archbishops of Trier and Mainz, who were earlier deposed by the Pope for supporting Anti Pope Felix V, who was elected by the Council of Basle in 1439. In exchange, the German Princes acknowledged Eugenius IV as legitimate Pope. The Emperor Frederick III was given the right to appoint some of the Bishops throughout the empire without need for Papal approval.

Much of the negotiations for the Concordat was done through the efforts of the Emperor Frederick III's secretary Enea Silvio Piccolomini, future Pope Pius II.

The terms of the agreement were repeated in the Concordat of Vienna concluded the next year.

The terms of the agreement were not to Eugenius IV's liking, but he felt compelled to make the concessions to the Emperor as he needed his assistance against the Council of Basle and the Catholic reform movements of that time. Already in February 1447, in the Bull Salvatoria, he proclaimed his successors to be free to annul the terms of the agreement. This action has clouded the validity of the concordat so that it was only concluded during the time of his successor, Nicholas V.
