= Concordat of 2009 =

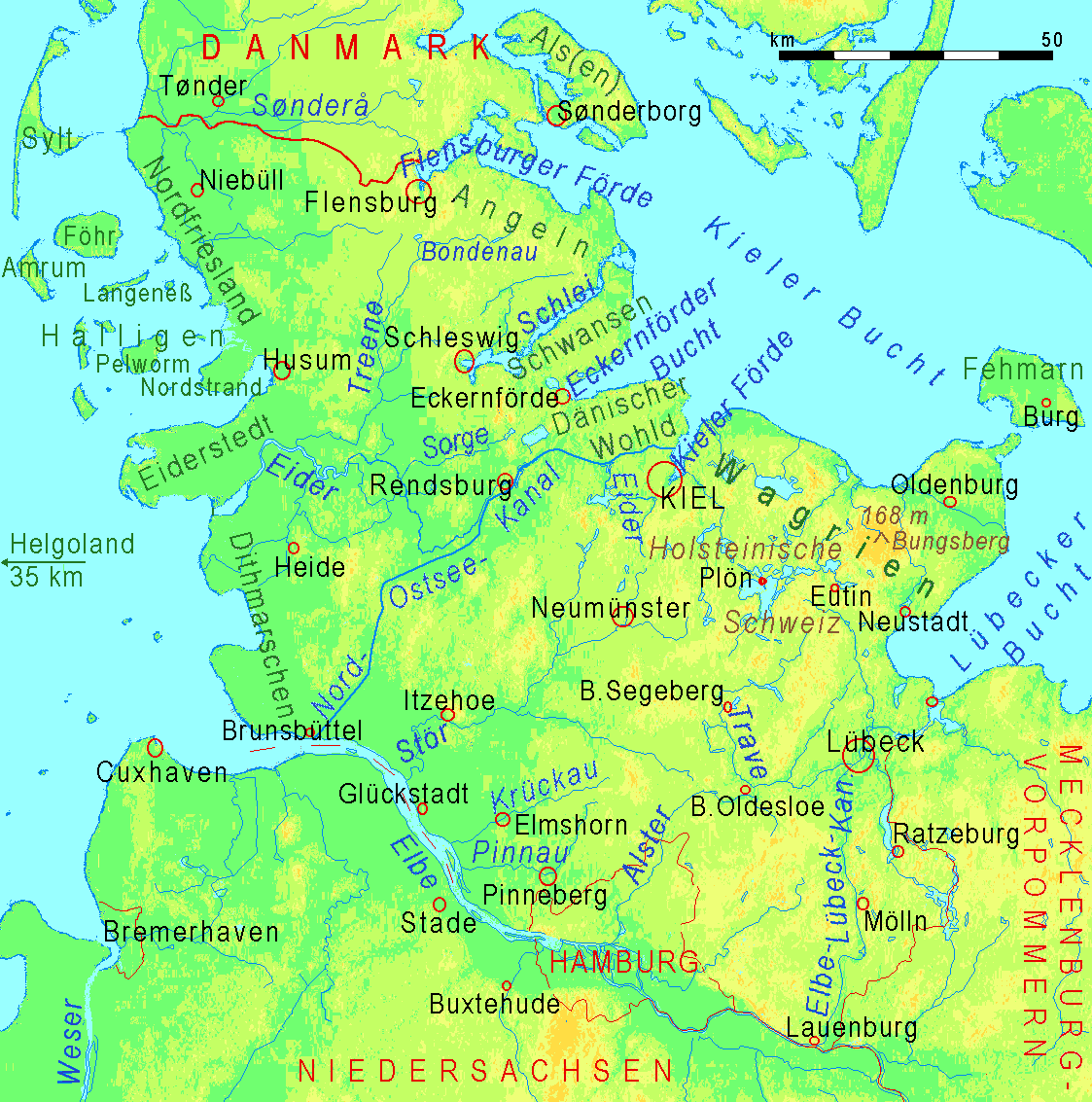
Schleswig-Holstein

The Concordat of 2009 between the Holy See and the Land of Schleswig-Holstein is an agreement between the Catholic Church in its temporal form and the state of Schleswig-Holstein that was signed on Monday 12 January 2009 in Kiel, Germany.

The concordat is an agreement between the Holy See and the Land Schleswig-Holstein, which regulates relations between the Catholic Church and the Land.

It was signed for the Holy See has by Jean-Claude Périsset, Apostolic Nuncio to Germany (as plenipotentiary) and for the Land Schleswig-Holstein, the Minister-President, Mr Peter Harry Carstensen.

The agreement, which consists of 24 articles, regulates the legal position of the Catholic Church in Schleswig-Holstein. Among other things, lays down rules about the teaching of Catholic religion in public schools, recognizing the state of schools in ecclesiastical administration, the university, the activities of the Church in the pastoral areas, health and socio-charitable, tax ecclesiastica and care of church entities to protect monuments.
