= Concordat of Bologna =

1515 treaty between France & Pope Leo X

The Concordat of Bologna (1516) was an agreement between King Francis I of France and Pope Leo X that Francis negotiated in the wake of his victory at Marignano in September 1515. The groundwork was laid in a series of personal meetings of king and pope in Bologna, 11–15 December 1515. The concordat was signed in Rome on 18 August 1516. It marked a stage in the evolution of the Gallican Church.

The Concordat explicitly superseded the Pragmatic Sanction of Bourges (1438), which had proved ineffective in guaranteeing the privileges of the Church in France, where bishoprics and abbacies had been wrangled over even before the Parlement of Paris: "hardly anywhere were elections held in due form", R. Aubenas observes, "for the king succeeded in foisting his own candidates upon the electors by every conceivable means, not excluding the most ruthless".

The Concordat permitted the Pope to collect all the income that the Catholic Church made in France, while the King of France was confirmed in his right to tithe the clerics and to restrict their right of appeal to Rome. (Note: Professor of History, Francis Oakley, states that the Concordat allowed for clerical appeals to Rome.) The Concordat confirmed the King of France's right to nominate appointments to benefice (archbishops, bishops, abbots and priors), enabling the Crown, by controlling its personnel, to decide who was to lead the Gallican Church. Despite these gains, the Concordat was not the triumph of the French monarchy and encountered bitter opposition from the Parlement of France and the University of Paris.

Canonical installation of those church officers was reserved to the Pope; thus the agreement confirmed the papal veto of any leader the King of France chose who might be deemed truly unqualified. The Concordat confirmed the Apostolic Camera's right to collect annates, the first year's revenue from each benefice, a right that when abused led to shuffling of prelates among dioceses. The fiction of elections to bishopric by canons and to abbacies by monks was discontinued. On Francis's part, it was at last firmly conceded that the Pope's powers were not subject to any council, an affirmation of the papal position in the long-crushed Conciliar Movement.

== Bibliography ==
- Aubenas, R. (1957). "The Papacy and the Catholic Church". In Hays, Denys (ed.). The New Cambridge Modern History. Vol. I: The Renaissance, 1493–1520. Cambridge University Press.
- Fletcher, Stella (2014). The Longman Companion to Renaissance Europe, 1390-1530. Taylor & Francis.
- Holt, Mack P. (1995). The French Wars of Religion, 1562-1629. Cambridge University Press.
- Knecht, R. J. (1963). "The Concordat of 1516: A Reassessment". In: University of Birmingham Historical Journal 9.1 (1963), pp. 16-32.
- Knecht, R. J. (1984). Francis I. Cambridge University Press.
- Knecht, R. J. (1994). Renaissance Warrior and Patron: The Reign of Francis I. Cambridge University Press.
- Oakley, Francis (1985). The Western Church in the Later Middle Ages. Cornell University Press.
- Thomas, Jules (1910). Le Concordat de 1516. (in French). Paris: A. Picard, 1910. Première partie: Les origines du Concordat de 1516. Deuxième partie: Les documents concordataires. Troisième partie: Histoire du Concordat de 1516 au XVI^{e} siècle.
- Wagner, John A. (2018). Documents of the Reformation. ABC-CLIO.
- Witte, John (2002). Law and Protestantism: The Legal Teachings of the Lutheran Reformation. Cambridge University Press.
