= Prussian Concordat =

1929 concordat between Prussia and the Vatican

The Prussian Concordat was a concordat signed between the Free State of Prussia and the Holy See on 14 July 1929 to normalize relations between Prussia and the Roman Catholic Church following the fall of the Prussian monarchy in 1918.

== Bibliography (in German) ==
- Dieter Golombek: Die politische Vorgeschichte des Preußenkonkordats (1929), Mainz 1970
- Joseph Listl (ed.): Die Konkordate und Kirchenverträge in der Bundesrepublik Deutschland Textausgabe für die Wissenschaft und Praxis, 2 Bde., Berlin 1987
- Joseph Listl: 'Die konkordatäre Entwicklung von 1817 bis 1988', in: Handbuch der bayerischen Kirchengeschichte, Walter Brandmüller (ed.), Volume 3, St. Ottilien 1991, S. 427–463
- Lothar Schöppe (ed.): Konkordate seit 1800. Originaltext und deutsche Übersetzung der geltenden Konkordate, Frankfurt am Main, Berlin 1964
- Werner Weber (ed.): Die deutschen Konkordate und Kirchenverträge der Gegenwart, 2 volumes, Göttingen 1962 und 1971
