= 1143 papal election =

Election of Catholic Pope Celestine II

Papal election September 1143

Dates and location
- 26 September 1143; Archbasilica of St. John Lateran, Rome

Key officials
- Dean: Corrado Demetri della Suburra
- Protopriest: Gerardo Caccianemici
- Protodeacon: Gregorio Tarquini

Elected pope
- Guido di Castello; Name taken: Celestine II
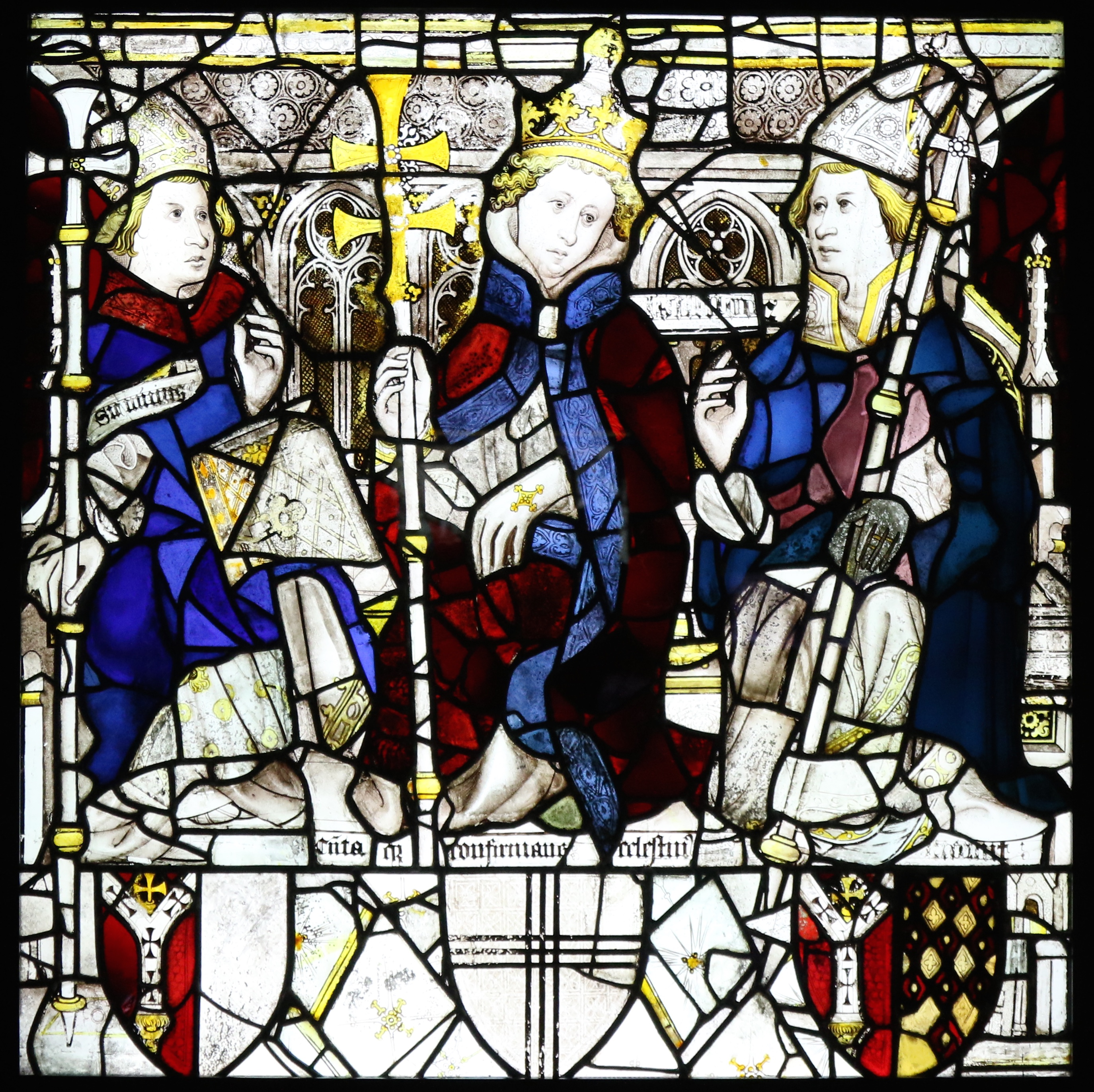

A papal election on 26 September 1143 followed the death of Innocent II and resulted in the election of Celestine II as the new pope of the Roman Catholic Church.

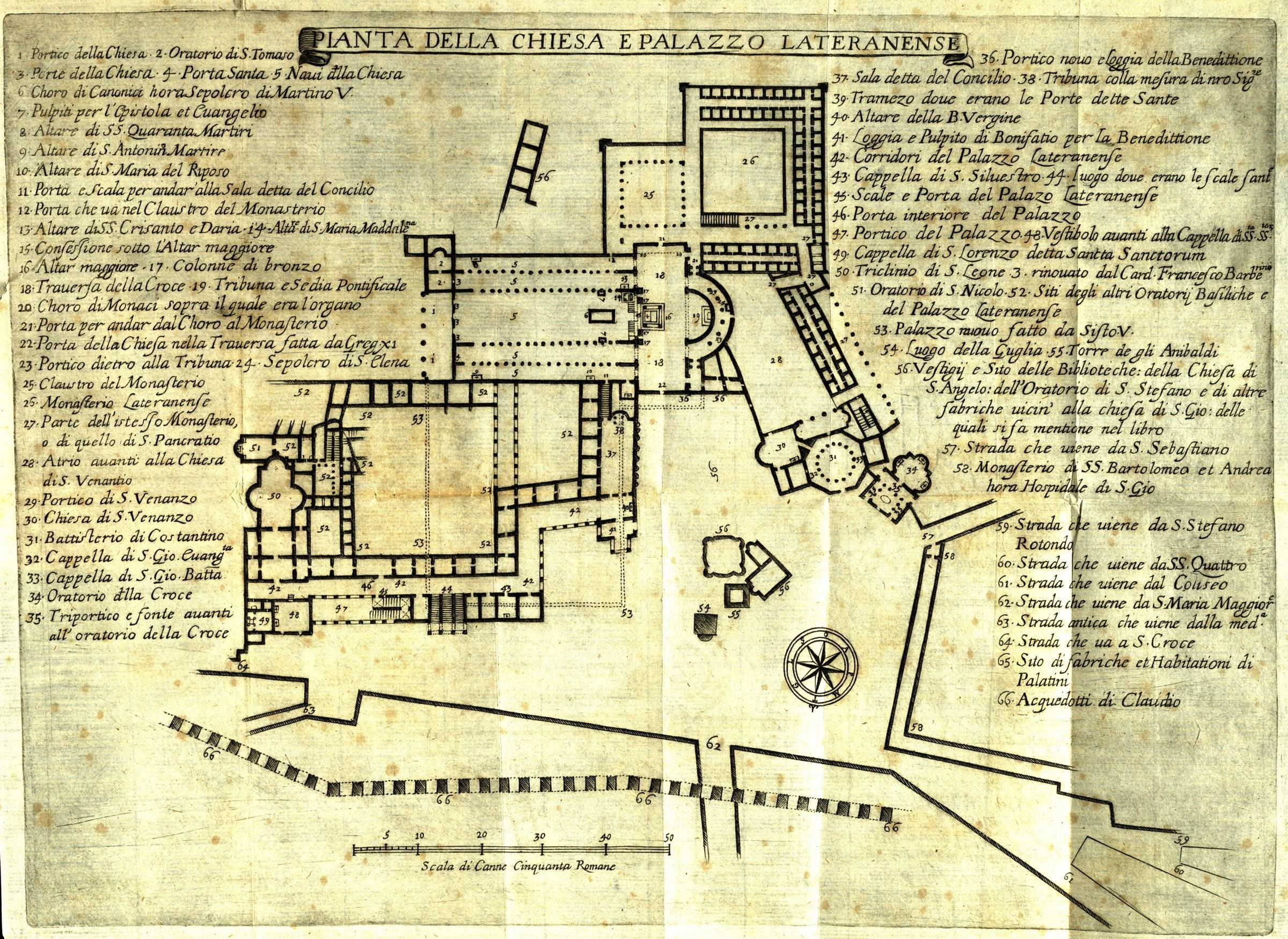
Plan of the medieval Lateran Basilica

== Election of Celestine II ==
Pope Innocent II died on 24 September 1143, at Rome. During the first eight years of his pontificate he faced the schism with Antipope Anacletus II (1130–1138), which finally ended in May 1138 with abdication and submission of Anacletus’ successor Antipope Victor IV (1138). The Second Lateran Council in April 1139 deposed from the ecclesiastical offices all former adherents of the Anacletus. However, despite the triumph over the antipope, the last years of Innocent's pontificate were not successful - papal armies were defeated by King Roger II of Sicily, who had received the crown from Anacletus II and demanded the recognition of his title from Innocent II. After the lost battle of Galluccio on 22 July 1139 the pope was taken prisoner by Roger and was forced to confirm all privileges given to the king by Anacletus II. Soon afterwards new serious problem arose at the city of Rome. In 1143, shortly before Innocent's death, the Roman people created a municipal commune which rejected the secular rule of the Papacy in the Eternal City. The election of Innocent's successor took place in the shadow of this municipal revolution.

The cardinals present at Rome assembled in the Lateran Basilica and on 26 September 1143 elected Cardinal Guido del Castello of S. Marco, who had previously served as legate of Innocent II before king Roger in 1137, and was the first cardinal known to hold the title of magister. He took the name Celestine II and was consecrated on the same day.

== Cardinal-electors ==
There were probably 30 cardinals in the Sacred College of Cardinals in September 1143. Basing on the examination of the subscriptions of the papal bulls in 1143 and the available data about the external missions of the cardinals it is possible to establish that no more than 23 cardinals participated in the election:

Elector	Cardinalatial Title	Elevated	Elevator	Notes
Corrado Demetri della Suburra	Bishop of Sabina	1113/14	Paschalis II	Dean of the College of Cardinals; future Pope Anastasius IV (1153—1154)
Alberic de Beauvais, O.S.B.Cluny	Bishop of Ostia	3 April 1138	Innocent II	
Étienne de Châlons, O.Cist.	Bishop of Palestrina	21 February 1141	Innocent II	
Imar, O.S.B.Cluny	Bishop of Tusculum	13 March 1142	Innocent II	
Pietro	Bishop of Albano	17 September 1143	Innocent II	
Gerardo Caccianemici, Can.Reg.	Priest of S. Croce in Gerusalemme	9 March 1123	Callixtus II	Protopriest; Chancellor of the Holy Roman Church; future Pope Lucius II (1144—1145)
Guido del Castello	Priest of S. Marco	1128/29	Honorius II	Elected Pope Celestine II
Guido Florentinus	Priest of S. Crisogono	1139	Innocent II	
Rainiero	Priest of S. Prisca	22 December 1139	Innocent II	
Gregorio della Suburra	Priest of S. Maria in Trastevere	1 March 1140	Innocent II	
Tommaso	Priest of S. Vitale	1 March 1140	Innocent II	
Pietro	Priest of S. Pudenziana	20 September 1140	Innocent II	Archpriest of the Vatican Basilica
Ubaldo	Priest of SS. Giovanni e Paolo	19 December 1141	Innocent II	
Gregorio Tarquini	Deacon of SS. Sergio e Bacco	9 March 1123	Callixtus II	Protodeacon
Odone Bonecase	Deacon of S. Giorgio in Velabro	4 March 1132	Innocent II	
Ubaldo	Deacon of S. Maria in Via Lata	21 December 1134	Innocent II	
Gerardo	Deacon of S. Maria in Domnica	27 May 1138	Innocent II	
Ottaviano de Monticelli	Deacon of S. Nicola in Carcere	25 February 1138	Innocent II	Future Antipope Victor IV (1159–1164)
Pietro	Deacon of S. Maria in Aquiro	21 February 1141	Innocent II	
Pietro	Deacon of S. Maria in Portico	19 September 1141	Innocent II	
Gregorio	Deacon of the Holy Roman Church	19 December 1141	Innocent II	
Niccolo	Deacon of the Holy Roman Church	13 March 1142	Innocent II	

Eighteen electors were created by Pope Innocent II, two by Pope Callixtus II, one by Pope Honorius II and one by Pope Paschalis II.

== Absentees ==
Elector	Cardinalatial Title	Elevated	Elevator	Notes
Theodwin, O.S.B.	Bishop of Santa Rufina	ca. 1133	Innocent II	Papal legate in Germany
Goizo	Priest of S. Cecilia	22 December 1139	Innocent II	Papal legate in Lombardy
Rainaldo di Collemezzo, O.S.B.Cas.	Priest of SS. Marcellino e Pietro	ca. 1139–1141	Innocent II	Abbot of Montecassino (external cardinal)
Ubaldo Allucingoli	Priest of S. Prassede	16 December 1138	Innocent II	Papal legate in Lombardy; future Pope Lucius III (1181–1185)
Guido Pisano	Deacon of SS. Cosma e Damiano	4 March 1132	Innocent II	Papal legate in Spain
Adenulf, O.S.B.	Deacon of S. Maria in Cosmedin	16 December 1132	Innocent II	Abbot of Farfa (external cardinal)
Guido de Castro Ficeclo	Deacon of the Holy Roman Church	1139	Innocent II	Papal legate in Bohemia and Moravia
Gilberto	Deacon of S. Adriano	13 March 1142	Innocent II	Papal legate in Umbria

== Sources ==
- Ganzer, Klaus (1963). Die Entwicklung des auswärtigen Kardinalats im hohen Mittelalter. Ein Beitrag zur Geschichte des Kardinalkollegiums vom 11.bis 13. Jahrhundert. Bibliothek des Deutschen Historischen Instituts in Rom (in German). Tübingen: Max Niemeyer Verlag.
- Robinson, Ian Stuart (1990). The Papacy 1073–1198. Continuity and Innovation. Cambridge Medieval Textbooks. Cambridge University Press. ISBN 0-521-31922-6.
- Jaffé, Phillipp (1885–1888). Regesta pontificum Romanorum ab condita Ecclesia ad annum post Christum natum MCXCVIII, vol. I–II (in Latin). Leipzig: Veit et comp.
- Kehr, Paul Fridolin (1906–1975). Regesta pontificum Romanorum. Italia Pontificia. Vol. I–X (in Latin). SUL Books in the Public Domain. Archived from the original on 2006-02-23.
- Miranda, Salvador. "Election of September 25 - 26, 1143 (Celestine II)". The Cardinals of the Holy Roman Church. Florida International University. OCLC 53276621.
- Zenker, Barbara (1964). Die Mitglieder des Kardinalkollegiums von 1130 bis 1159 (in German). Würzburg.
- Brixius, Johannes Matthias (1912). Die Mitglieder des Kardinalkollegiums von 1130-1181 (in German). Berlin: R. Trenkel.
