= 1145 papal election =

Election of Catholic Pope Eugene III

Papal election 1145

Dates and location
- 15 February 1145; San Cesareo in Palatio, Rome

Key officials
- Dean: Corrado Demetri della Suburra
- Protopriest: Guido Florentinus
- Protodeacon: Gregorio Tarquini

Elected pope
- Bernardo Pignatelli; Name taken: Eugene III
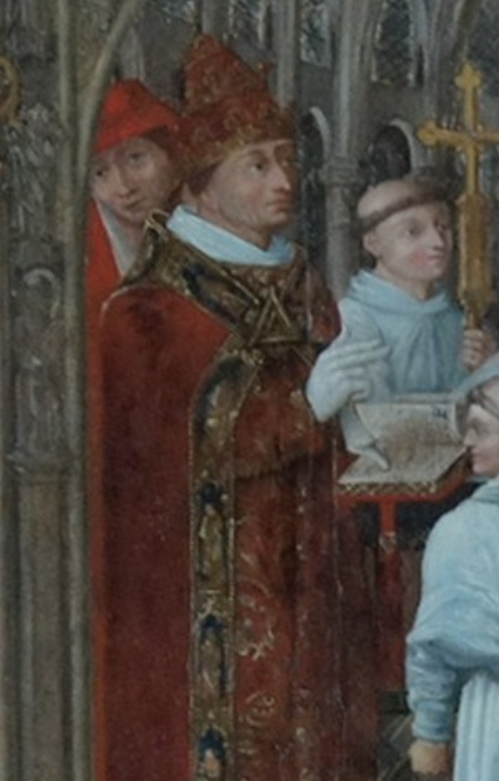

The 1145 papal election followed the death of Pope Lucius II and resulted in the election of Pope Eugene III, the first pope of the Order of Cistercians.

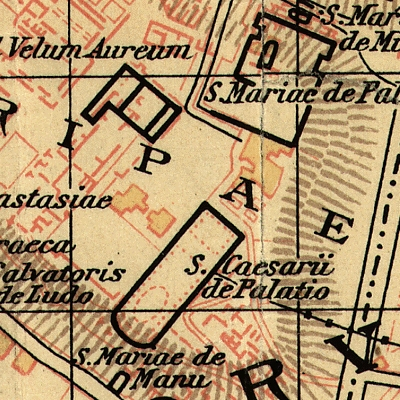
Map of Rome showing the location of San Cesareo in Palatio, south of San Giorgio in Velabro.

== Election of Eugene III ==
Pope Lucius II, during the whole of his pontificate, had to face the municipal commune at Rome, hostile towards the secular rule of the popes in the Eternal City. The republican faction elected Giordano Pierleoni, brother of the former Antipope Anacletus II, to the post of senator, and demanded that Lucius relinquish all temporal matters into his hands. The pope refused and led a small army against the seat of the commune on Capitol. He was defeated and seriously wounded in this attack, and died on 15 February 1145 in the church of S. Gregorio in clivo scauri. The cardinals present at Rome quickly assembled in the church of San Cesareo in Palatio and on the very same day unanimously elected to the papacy Bernardo Pignatelli, pupil of St. Bernard of Clairvaux, who was abbot of the Cistercian monastery of S. Anastasio alle Tre Fontane near Rome and probably did not belong to the College of Cardinals. The elect took the name of Eugene III. Due to hostility of the Roman people, his consecration took place in the monastery of Farfa on 18 February 1145.

== Cardinal-electors ==
There were probably 40 cardinals in the Sacred College of Cardinals in February 1145. Based on examination of the subscriptions of the papal bulls in 1145 and the available data about the external missions of the cardinals, it is possible to establish that no more than 34 cardinals participated in the election:

Elector	Cardinalatial Title	Elevated	Elevator	Notes
Corrado Demetri della Suburra	Bishop of Sabina	1113/14	Paschalis II	Dean of the College of Cardinals; future Pope Anastasius IV (1153–1154)
Theodwin, O.S.B.	Bishop of Santa Rufina	ca. 1133	Innocent II	
Pietro	Bishop of Albano	17 September 1143	Innocent II	
Guarino Foscari, Can.Reg.	Bishop of Palestrina	22 December 1144	Lucius II	
Rainiero	Priest of S. Prisca	22 December 1139	Innocent II	
Gregorio della Suburra	Priest of S. Maria in Trastevere	1 March 1140	Innocent II	
Tommaso	Priest of S. Vitale	1 March 1140	Innocent II	
Gilberto	Priest of S. Marco	13 March 1142	Innocent II	
Niccolo	Priest of S. Ciriaco	13 March 1142	Innocent II	
Manfredo	Priest of S. Sabina	17 December 1143	Celestine II	
Guido de Summa	Priest of S. Lorenzo in Damaso	17 December 1143	Celestine II	
Ariberto	Priest of S. Anastasia	17 December 1143	Celestine II	
Ugo Novariensis	Priest of S. Lorenzo in Lucina	17 December 1143	Celestine II	
Giulio	Priest of S. Marcello	19 May 1144	Lucius II	
Ubaldo Caccianemici, Can.Reg.	Priest of S. Croce in Gerusalemme	19 May 1144	Lucius II	
Robert Pullen	Priest of S. Martino	22 December 1144	Lucius II	Chancellor of the Holy Roman Church
Guido Puella, Can.Reg.	Priest of S. Pudenziana	22 December 1144	Lucius II	
Villano Gaetani	Priest of S. Stefano in Monte Celio	22 December 1144	Lucius II	Future archbishop of Pisa (1146–1175)
Gregorio Tarquini	Deacon of SS. Sergio e Bacco	9 March 1123	Callixtus II	Protodeacon
Odone Bonecase	Deacon of S. Giorgio in Velabro	4 March 1132	Innocent II	
Guido Pisano	Deacon of SS. Cosma e Damiano	4 March 1132	Innocent II	
Ottaviano de Monticelli	Deacon of S. Nicola in Carcere	25 February 1138	Innocent II	Future Antipope Victor IV (1159-1164)
Guido de Castro Ficeclo	Deacon of the Holy Roman Church	1139	Innocent II	
Pietro	Deacon of S. Maria in Portico	19 September 1141	Innocent II	
Gregorio	Deacon of S. Angelo in Pescheria	17 December 1143	Celestine II	
Astaldo degli Astalli	Deacon of S. Eustachio	17 December 1143	Celestine II	
Giovanni Caccianemici, Can.Reg.	Deacon of S. Maria Nuova	17 December 1143	Celestine II	
Giovanni Paparoni	Deacon of S. Adriano	17 December 1143	Celestine II	
Rodolfo	Deacon of S. Lucia in Septisolio	17 December 1143	Celestine II	
Berardo	Deacon of the Holy Roman Church	19 May 1144	Lucius II	
Giacinto Bobone	Deacon of S. Maria in Cosmedin	22 December 1144	Lucius II	Future Pope Celestine III (1191–1198)
Cinzio	Deacon of the Holy Roman Church	22 December 1144	Lucius II	
Jordan, O.Carth.	Deacon of the Holy Roman Church	22 December 1144	Lucius II	
Bernard, Can.Reg.	Deacon of the Holy Roman Church	22 December 1144	Lucius II	

Thirteen electors were created by Pope Innocent II, nine by Celestine II, eleven by Lucius II, one by Pope Callixtus II and one by Pope Paschalis II.

== Absentees ==
Elector	Cardinalatial Title	Elevated	Elevator	Notes
Alberic de Beauvais, O.S.B.Cluny	Bishop of Ostia	3 April 1138	Innocent II	Papal legate in France
Imar, O.S.B.Cluny	Bishop of Tusculum	13 March 1142	Innocent II	Papal legate in England
Guido Florentinus	Priest of S. Crisogono	1139	Innocent II	Protopriest; papal legate in Lombardy
Rainaldo di Collemezzo, O.S.B.Cas.	Priest of SS. Marcellino e Pietro	ca. 1139–1141	Innocent II	Abbot of Montecassino (external cardinal)
Ubaldo Allucingoli	Priest of S. Prassede	16 December 1138	Innocent II	Papal legate in Lombardy; future Pope Lucius III (1181–1185)
Ubaldo	Priest of SS. Giovanni e Paolo	19 December 1141	Innocent II	Papal legate in Poland and Denmark

== Sources ==
- Horn, Michael (1992). Studien zur Geschichte Papst Eugens III. (1145-1153) (in German). Frankfurt am Main: Peter Lang Verlag.
- Jaffé, Phillipp (1888). Regesta pontificum Romanorum ab condita Ecclesia ad annum post Christum natum MCXCVIII, vol. II (in Latin). Leipzig.
- Kehr, Paul Fridolin (1906–1975). Regesta pontificum Romanorum. Italia Pontificia. Vol. I–X (in Latin). SUL Books in the Public Domain. Archived from the original on 2006-02-23.
- Miranda, Salvador. "Election of February 15, 1145 (Eugenius III)". The Cardinals of the Holy Roman Church. Florida International University. OCLC 53276621.
- Robinson, Ian Stuart (1990). The Papacy 1073–1198. Continuity and Innovation. Cambridge Medieval Textbooks. Cambridge University Press. ISBN 0-521-31922-6.
- Zenker, Barbara (1964). Die Mitglieder des Kardinalkollegiums von 1130 bis 1159 (in German). Würzburg.
- Brixius, Johannes Matthias (1912). Die Mitglieder des Kardinalkollegiums von 1130-1181 (in German). Berlin: R. Trenkel.
- Bernhardi, Wilhelm (1883). Konrad III (in German). Leipzig: Verlag von Dunder & Humblot.
