= 1144 papal election =

Election of Catholic Pope Lucius II

Papal election 1144

Dates and location
- 9 March 1144; Rome

Key officials
- Dean: Corrado Demetri della Suburra
- Protopriest: Gherardo Caccianemici
- Protodeacon: Gregorio Tarquini

Elected pope
- Gherardo Caccianemici; Name taken: Lucius II
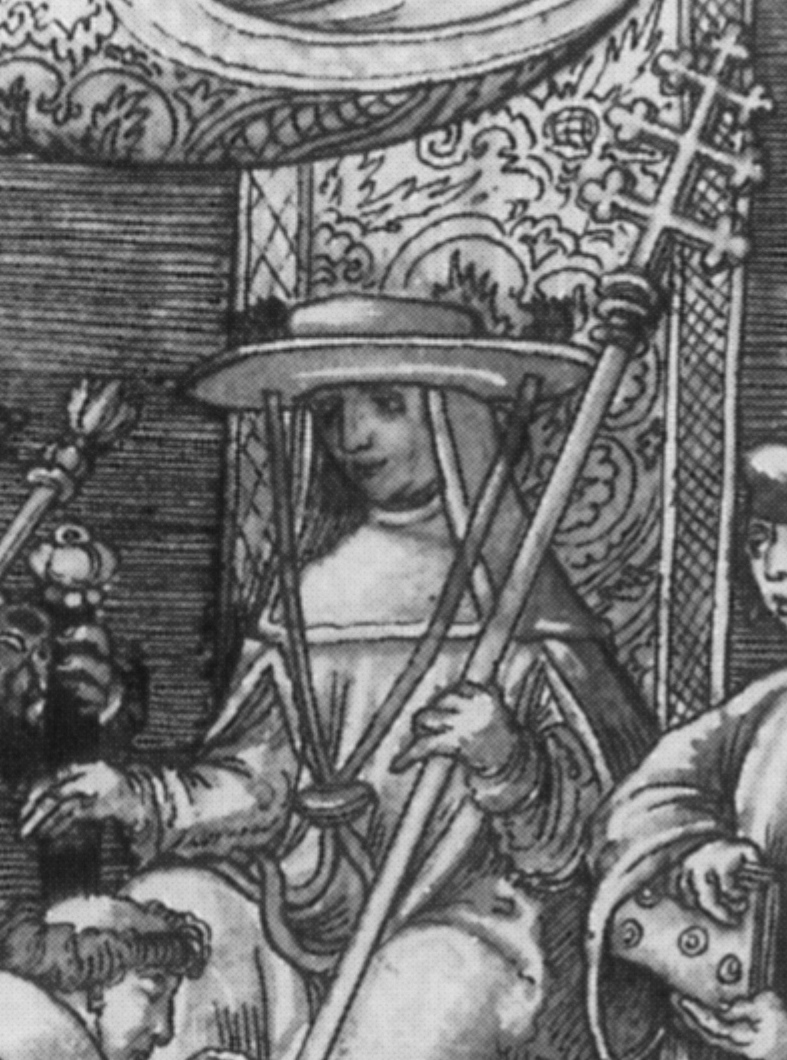

The 1144 papal election followed the death of Pope Celestine II and resulted in the election of Pope Lucius II.

== Election of Lucius II ==
Pope Celestine II died on 8 March 1144 at Rome, after a pontificate of only five months. The election of his successor took place in the shadow of this municipal revolution, which opposed the secular rule of the Pope. Celestine II was unable to recover full control over the city of Rome; in addition he had to face also the demands of the king Roger II of Sicily. This problem remained unresolved on his death, because he had refused to confirm the privileges granted to Roger by his predecessor Innocent II.

The cardinals present at Rome elected Cardinal Gherardo Caccianemici, priest of the titulus of S. Croce in Gerusalemme and former canon regular of S. Frediano di Lucca. The details concerning the place of the election or the exact date of electoral proceedings are not registered. Since the elect was chancellor of the Holy See and close collaborator of both Innocent II and Celestine II, it may be assumed that the cardinals wanted to continue their policy, friendly towards the Empire and hostile towards the king Roger. The elect took the name Lucius II and received episcopal consecration on 12 March 1144.

== Cardinal-electors ==
There were probably 39 cardinals in the Sacred College of Cardinals in March 1144. Based on examination of the subscriptions of the papal bulls in 1144 and the available data about the external missions of the cardinals, it is possible to establish that no more than 36 cardinals participated in the election:

Elector	Cardinalatial Title	Elevated	Elevator	Notes
Corrado Demetri della Suburra	Bishop of Sabina	1113/14	Paschalis II	Dean of the College of Cardinals; future Pope Anastasius IV (1153–1154)
Theodwin, O.S.B.	Bishop of Santa Rufina	ca. 1133	Innocent II	
Alberic de Beauvais, O.S.B.Cluny	Bishop of Ostia	3 April 1138	Innocent II	
Étienne de Châlons, O.Cist.	Bishop of Palestrina	21 February 1141	Innocent II	
Imar, O.S.B.Cluny	Bishop of Tusculum	13 March 1142	Innocent II	
Pietro	Bishop of Albano	17 September 1143	Innocent II	
Gherardo Caccianemici, Can.Reg.	Priest of S. Croce in Gerusalemme	9 March 1123	Callixtus II	Protopriest; Chancellor of the Holy Roman Church; elected Pope Lucius II
Guido Florentinus	Priest of S. Crisogono	1139	Innocent II	
Rainiero	Priest of S. Prisca	22 December 1139	Innocent II	
Goizo	Priest of S. Cecilia	22 December 1139	Innocent II	
Gregorio della Suburra	Priest of S. Maria in Trastevere	1 March 1140	Innocent II	
Tommaso	Priest of S. Vitale	1 March 1140	Innocent II	
Pietro	Priest of S. Pudenziana	20 September 1140	Innocent II	Archpriest of the Vatican Basilica
Ubaldo Allucingoli	Priest of S. Prassede	16 December 1138	Innocent II	Future Pope Lucius III (1181–1185)
Ubaldo	Priest of SS. Giovanni e Paolo	19 December 1141	Innocent II	
Gilberto	Priest of S. Marco	13 March 1142	Innocent II	
Niccolo	Priest of S. Ciriaco	13 March 1142	Innocent II	
Manfredo	Priest of S. Sabina	17 December 1143	Celestine II	
Rainiero	Priest of S. Stefano in Monte Celio	17 December 1143	Celestine II	
Guido de Summa	Priest of S. Lorenzo in Damaso	17 December 1143	Celestine II	
Ariberto	Priest of S. Anastasia	17 December 1143	Celestine II	
Gregorio Tarquini	Deacon of SS. Sergio e Bacco	9 March 1123	Callixtus II	Protodeacon
Odone Bonecase	Deacon of S. Giorgio in Velabro	4 March 1132	Innocent II	
Guido Pisano	Deacon of SS. Cosma e Damiano	4 March 1132	Innocent II	
Gerardo	Deacon of S. Maria in Domnica	27 May 1138	Innocent II	
Guido de Castro Ficeclo	Deacon of Holy Roman Church	1139	Innocent II	
Pietro	Deacon of S. Maria in Aquiro	21 February 1141	Innocent II	
Pietro	Deacon of S. Maria in Portico	19 September 1141	Innocent II	
Gregorio	Deacon of the Holy Roman Church	19 December 1141	Innocent II	
Gregorio	Deacon of S. Angelo in Pescheria	17 December 1143	Celestine II	
Astaldo degli Astalli	Deacon of S. Eustachio	17 December 1143	Celestine II	
Giovanni Caccianemici, Can.Reg.	Deacon of S. Maria Nuova	17 December 1143	Celestine II	Nephew of the elect
Giovanni Paparoni	Deacon of S. Adriano	17 December 1143	Celestine II	
Ugo Novariensis	Deacon of S. Lucia in Orphea	17 December 1143	Celestine II	
Rodolfo	Deacon of S. Lucia in Septisolio	17 December 1143	Celestine II	

Twenty two electors were created by Pope Innocent II, ten by Celestine II, two by Pope Callixtus II and one by Pope Paschalis II.

== Absentees ==
Elector	Cardinalatial Title	Elevated	Elevator	Notes
Rainaldo di Collemezzo, O.S.B.Cas.	Priest of SS. Marcellino e Pietro	ca. 1139-1141	Innocent II	Abbot of Montecassino (external cardinal)
Adenulf, O.S.B.	Deacon of S. Maria in Cosmedin	16 December 1132	Innocent II	Abbot of Farfa; papal legate in Germany
Ottaviano de Monticelli	Deacon of S. Nicola in Carcere	25 February 1138	Innocent II	Papal legate in the Kingdom of Sicily; future Antipope Victor IV (1159–1164)

== Sources ==
- Robinson, Ian Stuart (1990). The Papacy 1073–1198. Continuity and Innovation. Cambridge Medieval Textbooks. Cambridge University Press. ISBN 0-521-31922-6.
- Jaffé, Phillipp (1888). Regesta pontificum Romanorum ab condita Ecclesia ad annum post Christum natum MCXCVIII, vol. II (in Latin). Leipzig.
- Miranda, Salvador. "Election of March 9, 1144 (Lucius II)". The Cardinals of the Holy Roman Church. Florida International University. OCLC 53276621.
- Zenker, Barbara (1964). Die Mitglieder des Kardinalkollegiums von 1130 bis 1159 (in German). Würzburg.
- Brixius, Johannes Matthias (1912). Die Mitglieder des Kardinalkollegiums von 1130-1181 (in German). Berlin: R. Trenkel.
