= Cardinals created by Celestine II =

Catholic appointments in 1143

Pope Celestine II (1143–1144) created nine cardinals in one consistory:

== Consistory of 17 December 1143 ==
- Manfredo — cardinal-priest of S. Sabina, † 1157
- Raniero — cardinal-priest of S. Stefano in Monte Celio, † shortly before 22. December 1144
- Ariberto — cardinal-priest of S. Anastasia, † 1156
- Rodolfo — cardinal-deacon of S. Lucia in Septisolio, † after 17 July 1167
- Gregorio de Jacinto — cardinal-deacon of S. Angelo, then (April 1154) cardinal-bishop of Sabina, † 1154
- Astaldo degli Astalli — cardinal-deacon of S. Eustachio, then (2 March 1151) cardinal-priest of S. Prisca, † 1161
- Giovanni Caccianemici, Can.Reg. — cardinal-deacon of S. Maria Nuova, † 1152
- Giovanni Paparoni — cardinal-deacon of S. Adriano, then (2 March 1151) cardinal-priest of S. Lorenzo in Damaso † towards the end of 1153
- Hugo Novariensis — cardinal-deacon of S. Lucia in Orphea, then (19 May 1144) cardinal-priest of S. Lorenzo in Lucina, † 21 September 1150

== Additional notes ==
Apart from the cardinals mentioned above sometimes it is erroneously claimed that Celestine II created also some other persons to the cardinalate, who actually were created by other popes or are confused with other cardinals.

Cardinal-priests Giulio of S. Marcello and Robert Pullen of S. Martino, and cardinal-deacon Giacinto Bobone (future pope Celestine III) almost certainly were created by Lucius II. On the other hand, cardinal-deacon Gregorio is attested as cardinal already under Innocent II. Also cardinal Guido de Summa, appointed by Celestine II to the rank of cardinal-priest of S. Lorenzo in Damaso, probably was already a cardinal-deacon under Innocent II.

Cardinal-priest Gezo of S. Susanna, who allegedly subscribed a bull on 15 March 1144, certainly "owes" his existence wrong transcription of the signature Goizo presbiter cardinalis tituli S. Caeciliae.

Finally, cardinal Ugo Misani of Bologna, ostensibly created cardinal-priest of S. Lorenzo in Lucina, is undoubtedly the same person as cardinal-deacon Ugo of S. Lucia in Septisolio, who was promoted to the rank of cardinal-priest of S. Lorenzo in Lucina by Lucius II, and was born in Novara, not in Bologna.

== Sources ==
- Miranda, Salvador. "Consistories for the creation of Cardinals 12th Century (1099-1198): Celestine II (1143-1144)". The Cardinals of the Holy Roman Church. Florida International University. OCLC 53276621.
- Barbara Zenker: Die Mitglieder des Kardinalkollegiums von 1130 bis 1159. Würzburg 1964
- Johannes M. Brixius: Die Mitglieder des Kardinalkollegiums von 1130-1181. Berlin 1912
- Phillipp Jaffé, Regesta pontificum Romanorum ab condita Ecclesia ad annum post Christum natum MCXCVIII, vol. I-II. Leipzig 1885-1888
