= Cardinals created by Lucius II =

Catholic appointments in 1144

Pope Lucius II (1144–1145) created eleven cardinals in two consistories.

== Consistories ==
=== 19 May 1144 ===
- Ubaldo Caccianemici, Can.Reg. — cardinal-priest of S. Croce in Gerusalemme, † 1170
- Giulio — cardinal-priest of S. Marcello, then (19 December 1158) cardinal-bishop of Palestrina, † October 1164
- Berardo — cardinal-deacon of the Holy Roman Church, † after 1146

=== 22 December 1144 ===
- Guarino, Can.Reg. — cardinal-bishop of Palestrina, † 6 February 1158
- Robert Pullen — cardinal-priest of SS. Martino e Silvestro, † September 1146
- Guido Puella, Can.Reg. — cardinal-priest of S. Pudenziana, † 1157
- Villano Gaetani — cardinal-priest of S. Stefano in Monte Celio; later (Mai 1146) archbishop of Pisa, † 1175
- Giacinto Bobone — cardinal-deacon of S. Maria in Cosmedin, later (21 March 1191) Pope Celestine III, † 8 January 1198
- Jordan, O.Carth. — cardinal-deacon of the Holy Roman Church, then (21 December 1145) cardinal-priest of S. Susanna, † 1154
- Cenzio — cardinal-deacon of the Holy Roman Church, then (1145) cardinal-deacon of SS. Sergio e Bacco † after 1146
- Bernard of Porto, Can.Reg. — cardinal-deacon of the Holy Roman Church, then cardinal-priest of S. Clemente (21 December 1145) and cardinal-bishop of Porto e S. Rufina (19 December 1158), † 18 August 1176

== Additional notes ==
According to Lorenzo Cardella Lucius II promoted also Nikolaus of Germany to the rank of cardinal-deacon or cardinal-priest of S. Lorenzo in Damaso, but no such cardinal appears among signatories of the papal bulls. Cardella mentions also cardinal-deacon Guy of S. Maria in Portico but he was created only by Eugene III and is identical with future Antipope Paschalis III. Besides, it is possible that Lucius II promoted also cardinal-deacon Pietro of S. Maria in Via Lata, but most probably he was created by Eugene III in March 1145.

== Sources ==
- Miranda, Salvador. "Consistories for the creation of Cardinals, 12th Century (1099-1198): Lucius II (1144-1145)". The Cardinals of the Holy Roman Church. Florida International University. OCLC 53276621.
- Barbara Zenker: Die Mitglieder des Kardinalkollegiums von 1130 bis 1159. Würzburg 1964, pp. 224–225
- Johannes M. Brixius: Die Mitglieder des Kardinalkollegiums von 1130-1181. Berlin 1912, pp. 51–53
- Michael Horn: Studien zur Geschichte Papst Eugens III.(1145-1153), Peter Lang Verlag 1992
- Philipp Jaffé, Regesta pontificum Romanorum ab condita Ecclesia ad annum post Christum natum MCXCVIII, vol. II, Berlin 1888
- Lorenzo Cardella: Memorie storiche de' cardinali della Santa Romana Chiesa, Rome 1792, vol. I, pt. 2
