= Giuliano Cesarini, iuniore =

Roman Catholic cardinal

His Eminence Giuliano Cesarini
- Cardinal-Deacon of Sant'Angelo in Pescheria
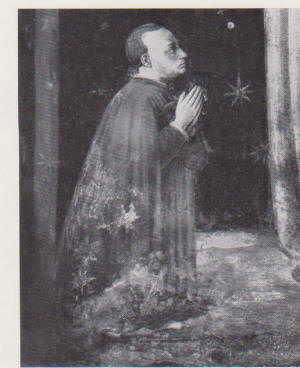
- Church: Catholic Church
- Appointed: 12 June 1503
- Term ended: 1 May 1510
- Predecessor: Giovanni Michiel
- Successor: Federigo de San Severino
- Other posts: Administrator of Ascoli Piceno (1500-1510)
- Previous posts: Cardinal-Deacon of Santi Sergio e Bacco (1493-1503)

Orders
- Created cardinal: 20 September 1493 by Pope Alexander VI
- Rank: Cardinal-Deacon

Personal details
- Born: 1466 Rome, Papal States
- Died: 1 May 1510 (aged 43–44) Rome, Papal States
- Coat of arms: Giuliano Cesarini's coat of arms

Giuliano Cesarini the Younger (It.: Giuliano Cesarini, iuniore; 1466–1510) was an Italian Catholic prelate and cardinal.

== Biography ==
Giuliano Cesarini, iuniore was born in Rome in 1466, the son of Gabriele Cesarini, Gonfaloniere of the Senate and Roman People (Senatus populusque Romanus), and his wife Giulina (Godina). Her father was Giovanni Andrea Colonna, and her mother was Ambroscina de'Astalli. Giuliano had two brothers, Pietro Paolo and Giovanni Giorgio. Giovanni Giorgio succeeded his father as Gonfaloniere in 1499. A third brother, Giovanni Andrea, was married to Gerolama Borgia, daughter of Pope Alexander VI, but both spouses died in 1483. They were the grand-nephews of Cardinal Giuliano Cesarini, seniore. Giuliano also had four sisters: Antonina (wife of Carlo Muti), Caterina (wife of Antonino Albertoni), Alteria (who married a Margana), and Livia (wife of Pietro Ludovico Capizucchi).

Early in his career, he was a protonotary apostolic, and a canon of the chapter of St. Peter's Basilica (attested between 1490 and 1493). From 13 March 1491, Giuliano was a canon of the Cathedral chapter of Liège.

=== Cardinal ===
In the consistory of 20 September 1493, Pope Alexander VI created Cesarini a cardinal deacon. Cesarini received the red hat and the deaconry of Santi Sergio e Bacco on 23 September 1493. He lived in a palazzo in the Pigna region of the city of Rome, which had been reconstructed from several family houses by his great-uncle, Cardinal Giuliano Cesarini, seniore.

King Charles VIII of France, who was on his way to Naples, entered Rome with his army on 31 December 1494. Cardinals Colonna, Savelli, Peraudi, de la Grolaie, Sanseverino, Lunati, and della Rovere were with him. The king was met privately ahead of time by Johann Burchard, the papal Master of Ceremonies, who briefed the King on protocol, but Charles wanted a quiet entry without pomp. Cardinal Sforza came out to meet the King, and at the Milvian Bridge (Ponte Mollo), he was greeted by Cardinal Cibò. On 2 January 1495, the King received all of the cardinals at the Palazzo San Marco, where he was lodged, with the exception of Carafa and Orsini, who were in attendance upon the Pope. The King received them coldly, without the customary honours. Cesarini visited Charles after dinner and was admitted by the Duke of Albany, and he and the king walked up and down together. It is possible that he was carrying a private message from Alexander. On 27 May 1495, Cesarini and nineteen other cardinals accompanied the Pope to Civitavecchia, then Orvieto, and then Perugia, in order to avoid problems that might arise from the further visit to Rome by Charles, now on the return journey from his war against Naples. The Curia returned to Rome with Alexander on 27 June 1495.

On 13 February 1500, Bishop Prospero Caffarelli of Ascoli Piceno was buried at the Minerva in Rome. The following day, Cesarini was appointed apostolic administrator of the diocese a post he held until his death. On 20 February, Cesarini's majordomo, Bishop Antonio Bavano of Parenzo, died of the plague. The papal Master of Ceremonies, Johann Burchard, notes in his Diary that he knew neither where nor how he was buried, since Bavano's padrone "was lacking in all goodness and humanity."

On 26 February 1500, a grand reception was staged in Rome for Duke Valentino (Cesare Borgia) at the Porta del Popolo and a festive procession through the city to Saint Peter's. Alexander VI awaited his son in the loggia above the entrance to the Vatican Palace, in the company of Cardinals Juan de Borja, Giovanni de San Giorgio, Juan Lopez, Cesarini, and Alessandro Farnese. Cesarini also participated in a similar ceremonial capacity in the investiture of Duke Valentino as Gonfaloniere of the Holy Roman Church and the award of the Golden Rose on Laetare Sunday, 29 March 1500. On Holy Thursday, 17 April 1500, Cesarini read out the papal bull which proclaimed the granting of a plenary indulgence on the occasion, and on Easter Sunday at the Papal Solemn Mass, he had the privilege, as cardinal deacon, of reading the Latin Gospel.

On 5 March 1503, Cesarini was appointed archpriest of the Basilica of St Mary Major.

=== Conclaves ===
Cardinal Cesarini participated in the papal conclave of September 1503 that elected Pope Pius III. The principal problem during the Sede Vacante that preceded the Conclave's opening on 16 September was that of security. There was a French army descending on Rome, and at the same time, a Neapolitan army was approaching from the South. Cesare Borgia was in command of a force of 12,000 troops, mostly Spanish, who occupied the Leonine City (Vatican area). Most Cardinals refused to approach the Papal Palace while Cesare was in charge, and were actually negotiating with the Castellan of the Castel S. Angelo to use that fortress as a secure place to hold the Conclave. On 28 August, Cardinal Cesarini was sent along with Cardinals Carvajal, Vera, and Medici to persuade the Castellan to hand over the keys. This he refused, in accordance with his sworn oath to hand over the fortress only to the new pope. Cesare, who in the meantime had decided to switch to the French side, was finally persuaded to vacate the Papal Palace and remove his troops. As he was departing for the heights of Monte Mario on 2 September, and passing through the Garden Gate (Porta Vineae extra Portam Viridarii), he was accosted by Cardinal Cesarini, his sister's brother-in-law, who wanted to speak with Cesare. The reply given him was that "The Duke is not granting an audience." Cesarini could only return to the business meetings of the Cardinals and the contemplation of the possible future of the supporters of the Borgia clan. The Conclave opened on 16 September, but no vote was taken until 21 September. Cesarini voted for Della Rovere and Piccolomini. Then some concentrated negotiation produced a substantial and successful two-thirds majority for Cardinal Francesco Tedeschini-Piccolomini of Siena on 22 September. He chose the name Pius III. Piccolomini's brother was married to the illegitimate daughter of Ferdinand I of Naples. The French had lost. But temperamentally Piccolomini was a temporizer, and the French hopes revived when Pius III granted Charles VIII permission to march his troops through Rome as he headed toward Naples.

The death of Pius III after only twenty-six days on the papal throne gave everyone a second chance. Cesarini then participated in the papal conclave of October 1503 that elected Pope Julius II. There was no ballot. Giuliano Della Rovere was elected by acclamation on the morning of 1 November.

On 29 November 1503, Cardinal Cesarini opted for the deaconry of Sant'Angelo in Pescheria.

He died in Rome on 1 May 1510. Paris de Grassis, the Papal Master of Ceremonies, provided a comment at his death: vir alioqui formosus, grandis, pomposus, et totus in vita et virtute magnificus. His tomb is in Santa Maria in Aracoeli.

== Bibliography ==
- Burchard, Joannes (1884). Louis Thuasne (ed.). Diarum sine rerum urbanarum commentarii (in Latin). Vol. II: 1492–1499. Paris: E. Leroux.
- Burchard, Joannes (1885). Louis Thuasne (ed.). Johannis Bruchardi Argentinensis capelle pontificie sacrorum rituum magistri diarium (in Latin). Vol. Tome troisième: 1500–1506. Paris: E. Leroux.
- Eubel, Conradus (1913) (W. Gulik ed.). Hierarchia catholica medii aevi, sive Summorum pontificum, S.R.E. cardinalium, ecclesiarum antistitum series, editio altera, Tomus II (Monasterii 1913). (in Latin)
- Pastor, Ludwig von (1902). The History of the Popes, from the close of the Middle Ages, third edition, Volume V Saint Louis: B. Herder 1902.
- Pastor, Ludwig von. The History of the Popes, from the close of the Middle Ages, second edition, Volume VI Saint Louis: B. Herder 1902.
- Rosini, Patrizia (2016). Famiglia Cesarini: Ricerche e documenti Lulu 2016. (self-published, online). Retrieved: 2017-09-02.
