= Guido de Summa =

Italian Cardinal

Guido de Summa (died 1151) was an Italian Cardinal.

He was born in Milan. Probably, he was already a Cardinal-Deacon under Pope Innocent II and as such, he signed papal bulls between 12 January 1142 and 9 December 1143. Certainly, Pope Celestine II named him Cardinal-Priest of S. Lorenzo in Damaso, in the consistory celebrated on 17 December 1143. He subscribed the papal bulls as Cardinal-Prest between 28 December 1143 and 6 May 1149, and participated in the papal election, 1144 and papal election, 1145. On 23 September 1149, Eugenius III consecrated him Bishop of Ostia; as such, he signed papal bulls from 6 November 1149 until 14 April 1150. For many years, he acted as papal legate in Lombardy. He is attested for the last time in the document issued in Ferentino on 10 May 1151.

== Bibliography ==
- Johannes M. Brixius, Die Mitglieder des Kardinalkollegiums von 1130-1181, Berlin 1912, p. 49-50 no. 4

Catholic Church titles
Preceded by Alberic	Cardinal-bishop of Ostia; 1149–1151	Succeeded by Hugo
