= Pietro Papareschi =

Italian Cardinal

Pietro (Papareschi) was an Italian born-cardinal created by Pope Innocent II on 17 September 1143. He is often referred to as brother of Innocent II and member of the Roman family of Papareschi but this is not attested in the contemporary sources. He signed the papal bulls as Cardinal-Bishop of Albano between 9 December 1143 and 28 April 1145. He participated in the papal elections in September 1143, March 1144 and February 1145. He died after April 1145.
