= Robert Pullen =

English theologian and Cardinal

Robert Pullen (also rendered as Polenius, Pullan, Pullein, Pullenus, Pullus, Pully, and La Poule; c. 1080 – c. 1146) was an English theologian and cardinal of the Catholic Church, often considered to be one of the founders of Oxford University.

== Biography ==
Nothing is known of his early life except that he was of English parentage. The conjecture of an early-20th-century biographer (Williams) that he was born at Poole, Dorsetshire is not supported by any evidence. Other accounts state that he came from Devonshire (specifically Exeter, born around 1080). John of Hexham's continuation of the history of Symeon of Durham, written within half a century of Pullen's death, asserts that king Henry I of England offered to make him bishop, which he refused, being devoted to the study of philosophy.

His early education was received in England, but during the troubles which began with the accession of King Stephen in 1135 he seems to have gone to Paris to continue his life of study in peace there. According to other accounts, he completed his education at the Sorbonne. In 1133 he began to teach at Oxford, being among the first of the celebrated teachers in the schools which were afterwards organized into the University of Oxford. Multitudes are said to have come to hear him. He opened schools there and taught without exacting fees; he is said to have supported many scholars at his own expense and to have been largely instrumental in fostering the growth of the Oxford schools. If these traditions are true, albeit that they rest on the statements of later writers, it would seem more probable that they happened during the reign of Henry I, when Pullen is said to have refused the episcopate. He was certainly Archdeacon of Rochester in 1134, and was absent from England for a notable time within the next few years, since at some date prior to 1143 he seems to have been in trouble with his bishop for absenting himself from his duties. This appears from an undated letter of St. Bernard addressed to the Bishop of Rochester, in which the saint makes his excuses for detaining Pullen in Paris "on account of the sound doctrine which is recognized in him." In the same letter he criticizes the bishop for seizing the archdeacon's goods, and he begs that Pullen may stay longer in Paris, where he is necessary. Though Bishop Stubbs (op. cit.) has thrown doubt on the identity of this Archdeacon Robert Pullen with the cardinal Robert Pullus (also called Pullen), the statements of St. Bernard's biographer, William Abbot of Theodoric, and the Oseney Chronicle justify the identification.

While in Paris, Pullen taught logic and theology with great success. Among his pupils was John of Salisbury, who describes him as a man commended both by his life and his learning, in 1141 or 1142. In 1143 he is still described as Archdeacon of Rochester and in or about that year he probably went to Rome on the invitation of Innocent II, who died in September of that year, but Pullen found favour with the new pope, Celestine II, who created him a cardinal (Ciaconius). The Oseney chronicler, however, states that he was called to Rome by Lucius II who succeeded Celestine in 1144. Certainly Pope Lucius appointed him Chancellor of the Holy Roman Church, an office which he was discharging through 1145 and 1146. This we know from the biography of St Bernard written by William of St. Thierry, and from his letters. Pullus was instrumental in the development of the concept of purgatory, questioning where purgation took place, as neither heaven nor hell seemed entirely appropriate. Whether by Lucius or Celestine, he was a cardinal by around 1144. When St. Bernard's disciple, Pope Eugene III, became pope in 1145, the saint wrote a letter to Cardinal Pullen, begging him to console and counsel the new pontiff.

His date of death is uncertain; he died in or after 1146.

== Works ==
As a theologian Cardinal Pullen used all his influence against the teaching of Abelard, and set out his doctrine in his work Sententiarum Logicarum Libri VIII. In this treatise he was breaking new ground, being one of the first teachers to compile a book of "Sentences," but his work was soon supplanted by that of Peter Lombard (with his "Libri Sententiarum"). He covers a wide range of subjects, but his treatment lacks orderly arrangement, and he relies for his proofs on Scripture and reason in preference to the testimony of tradition. Taking his stand on the authority of the Bible and of papal decisions, he proceeds to enter on speculative discussion. The first book treats of God and His attributes; the second, of the creation, of angels, of the soul, of the fall of man and of original sin; the third, of the ancient and the new law, and of the Incarnation; the fourth, of God's power, of Christ's Passion and of hell and purgatory; the fifth, of the Resurrection, the descent of the Holy Ghost, the preaching of the Gospel, of the sacraments of baptism, confirmation and confession and some virtues and vices. The sixth book deals with a variety of subjects, including ignorance, negligence and frailty, good and bad spirits, the choirs of angels, merits, and the administration of the Sacrament of Penance; the seventh discusses the forgiveness of sins, penance and fasting, prayer, tithes, the civil power, the priesthood, its privileges and obligations, continency, the contemplative and active life, and matrimony. The eighth book deals with the Blessed Sacrament, the Second Advent, Antichrist, the Last Judgment and the ultimate state of the saved and the lost. Marcia L. Colish describes the eight volume work as poorly organized, redundant and "unwieldy". Joseph Goering identified Robert Pullen as the inventor of the term "transubstantiation" to describe the change that takes place in the gifts at the eucharistic altar.

The titles of some other works which remain unpublished are given by Pitts: "In Apocalypsim Sancti Johannis"; "Super aliquot psalmos"; "De contemptu mundi"; "Super doctorum dictis"; "Praelectiones"; "Sermones." A manuscript copy of the sermons is preserved at Lambeth Palace, and Rashdall (Dictionary of Nat. Biogr.) observes of them that "the sermons, which breathe a very ascetic spirit, were evidently delivered to scholars." Ulysse Chevalier is certainly in error in identifying him with the Cardinal Robert who was cardinal priest of St. Eusebius in December 1134. This Robert was created cardinal by Innocent II in 1130, a date inconsistent with the known facts of Pullen's life.
