= Gregorio Tarquini =

Catholic cardinal (died 1145)

Gregorio Tarquini (died 1145) was an Italian cardinal of the Catholic Church. Born in Rome, he was created cardinal deacon of Sts. Sergio e Bacco in December 1122. He participated in five papal elections: those of 1124 (Honorius II), 1130 (Innocent II, whom he supported against Anacletus II), 1143 (Celestine II), 1144 (Lucius II) and 1145 (Eugenius III).
