= Theodwin of Santa Rufina =

German Benedictine abbot, cardinal and papal legate of the 12th century

Theodwin (also Theodwine, Theodin or Theodevin) (died probably on 7 March 1151 in the Kingdom of Jerusalem) was a German Benedictine abbot, cardinal and papal legate of the 12th century.

== Biography ==
Theodwin was Abbot of Gorze Abbey from 1126 to ca. 1133 and later was elevated to Cardinal as the Bishop of Santa Rufina, a position he held until his death.

Theodwin participated in the papal elections of 1144 and 1145. He subscribed solemn papal privileges between 7 June 1135 and 15 June 1150.

In 1147, as legate in Syria, he participated in the conference celebrated in Ptolemaïs between Emperor Conrad III of Germany, King Louis VII of France, and King Baldwin of Jerusalem.

== Diplomacy with Germany ==
Theodwin was the only German cardinal of his era. For that reason, he was especially influential in the Roman curia and was a close friend of Conrad III of Germany, whose election he supported in 1138. He was often the papal legate, or acting as such, in Germany. Prior to the Second Crusade, the church sent him to Germany in 1145 in an attempt to resolve some of the domestic political tensions there with the hope that a resolution would allow Germany to participate in the crusade. Later, during the Crusade, he served as the papal representative and travelled with Conrad.

== Relations with Sicily ==
In the aftermath of the failed Crusade, when Conrad's reputation was at low ebb, Roger II of Sicily persuaded Theodwin to write to Conrad and convince him that Roger was an ally of the Crusaders. This was all part of an effort to break the alliance between the Holy Roman Empire and the Byzantine Empire, against which Roger desired to make war. According to Abbot Suger, Godfrey, the Archbishop of Langres who was travelling with Louis VII of France and Eleanor of Aquitaine, may have been an influence on Theodwin's writing. Theodwin's own apparent anti-Byzantinism, typical of the curia of the day, played no small part in affairs. The whole discourse, however, was conducted without the support of Pope Eugene III, whose politics were more moderate (and anti-Sicilian). Eugene even informed Wibald of Corvey that the opinion of Theodwin, and that of Bernard of Clairvaux, was not in line with papal thinking and was to be ignored.

== Death ==
Some time after 15 June 1150 Theodwin has been sent again as papal legate to the Holy Land, where he died, most probably on 7 March 1151. However, some records suggest he participated in the 1153 papal election at which Pope Anastasius IV was elected.
