= Guarinus of Palestrina =

Italian Catholic Augustinian canon regular

Saint Guarinus of Palestrina C.R.S.A.
- Cardinal-Bishop of Palestrina
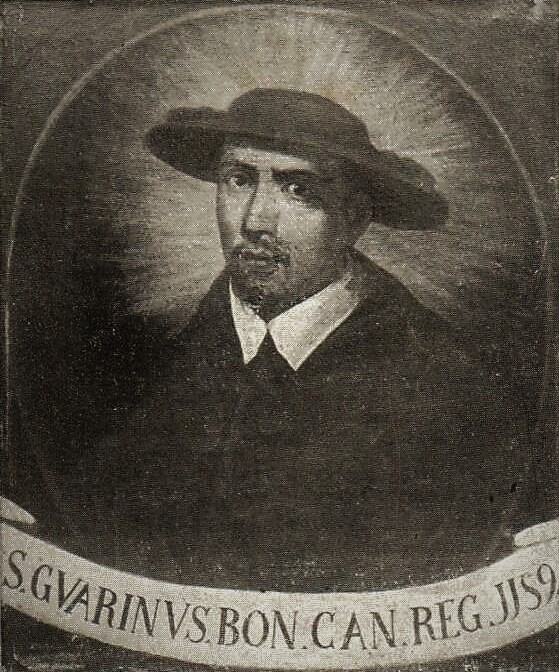
- Church: Roman Catholic Church
- Appointed: December 1144
- Term ended: 6 February 1158
- Predecessor: Étienne
- Successor: Giulio

Orders
- Ordination: 1204
- Consecration: 1145
- Created cardinal: December 1114 by Pope Lucius II
- Rank: Cardinal-Bishop

Personal details
- Born: Guarino Foscari c. 1080 Bologna
- Died: 6 February 1158 (aged 78) Palestrina, Papal States

Sainthood
- Feast day: 6 February
- Venerated in: Roman Catholic Church
- Canonized: 1159 by Pope Alexander III
- Attributes: Cardinal's attire; Crozier
- Patronage: Palestrina

Guarino Foscari (c. 1080 – 6 February 1158) was an Italian Catholic Augustinian canon regular and also the Cardinal-Bishop of Palestrina from December 1144 after his relative Pope Lucius II elevated him into the cardinalate.

He is better known as "Guarinus of Palestrina" and is noted for his charitable compassion for the poor of Palestrina.

Pope Alexander III canonized him as a saint of the Roman Catholic of Church in 1159.

== Life ==
Guarino Foscari was born in Bologna around 1080; he was a member of the noble Guarini household while his mother was a Foscari.

Foscari was well educated and was quite fond of literature. Despite opposition from his parents, he was ordained to the priesthood at the age of 24. He was later named as the Canon of the Cathedral of Bologna. In 1104, Foscari joined the Santa Croce Congregation of canons at Mortara. Prior to his departure he donated all of his goods for the building of a hospital.

At the age of 59, he was elected to fill an opening that the death of the bishop of Pavia created but evaded his episcopal consecration when he climbed out of a window. He went into hiding until another election was held.

During the Advent season of 1144, Pope Lucius II sent for him and he again attempted to avoid higher office. Lucius II had Guarino arrested, but he escaped for a brief period of time. But soon after Lucius II had him appointed in December 1144 as the Cardinal-Bishop of Palestrina. He also bestowed on him a number of gifts suitable to a person of his new standing, including some fine horses, which Guarino sold and distributing the funds to the poor.

Feeling unworthy of the position, he left his post twice. The first time, he was recalled from Subiaco due to the orders of Pope Eugene III. The second time he went to Ostia, but finding Saracens there, he fled to Rome. He was bishop for thirteen years and remained out of the troublesome Roman politics that so defined the time and temperament of Rome. As a cardinal he participated in three conclaves that saw the elections of Eugene III, Pope Anastasius IV, and Pope Adrian IV.

He died at the age of 78, on 6 February 1158. He was canonized by Pope Alexander III in 1159.

Guarino was buried in the crypt of the Cathedral of Sant'Agapito. In 1473, Palestrina was looted and his remains were hidden for fear of desecration. Although a search was made in 1754, they were not located.

== Bibliography ==
- Paul Burns, Butler's Lives of the Saints (2000), p. 66, The Liturgical Press; ISBN 0814623883
