= Santi Sergio e Bacco =

- Cathedral of Saints Sergius and Bacchus
- Cattedrale dei Santi Sergio e Bacco degli Ucraini
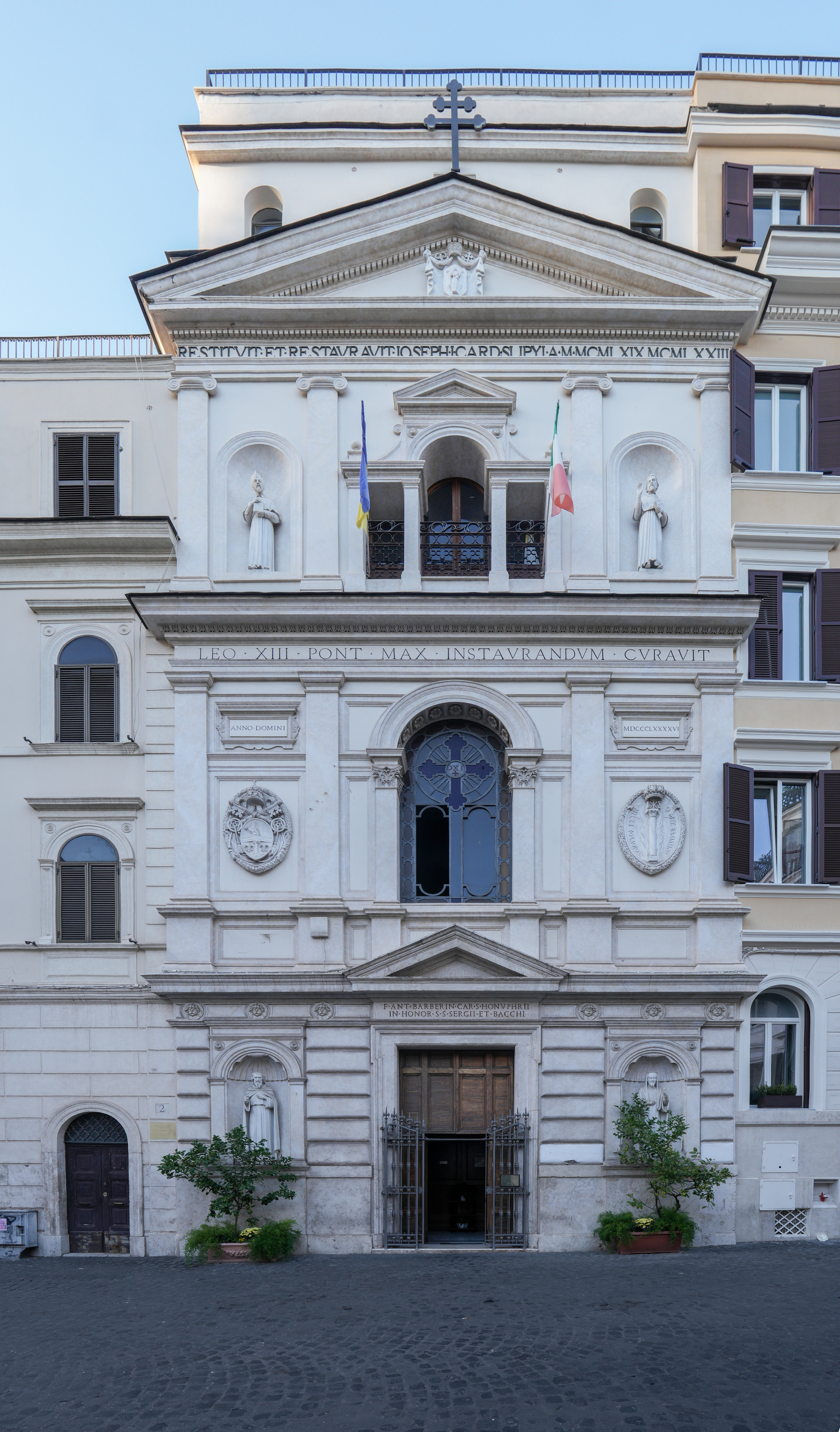
- Façade
- Click on the map for a fullscreen view
- 41°53′42″N 12°29′27″E
- Location: Piazza della Madonna dei Monti 3, Rome
- Country: Italy
- Language: Ukrainian
- Denomination: Ukrainian Greek Catholic Church
- Previous denomination: Roman Catholic (to 1641)
- Tradition: Byzantine Rite
- Website: ukr-parafia-roma.it

History
- Status: titular church
- Founded: AD 726
- Dedication: Sergius and Bacchus

Architecture
- Style: Baroque, Neoclassic
- Completed: 1741

Administration
- Diocese: Apostolic Exarchate of Italy

Santi Sergio e Bacco (Note: Ukrainian: Катедральний храм Святих мучеників Сергія і Вакха та Жировицької ікони Пресвятої Богородиці, romanized: Katedralnyi khram Sviatykh muchenykiv Serhiia i Vakkha ta Zhyrovytskoyi ikony Presviatoyi Bohorodytsi.) is a Catholic church of the Byzantine Rite located on Piazza Madonna dei Monti in the rione of Monti in Rome, Italy. Sergius and Bacchus are said to have been early fourth-century Roman military officers and Christian martyrs buried in Syria. In the 9th century the church was known as Sergius and Bacchus in Callinico, in the Middle Ages as Sergius and Bacchus de Suburra, and from the 18th century forward has been known also as the church of Madonna del Pascolo. Since 1970 it has been a national church of the Ukrainian Greek Catholic Church in Rome and was known officially as the "Parish of Ukrainian Catholics of Madonna del Pascolo and Saints Sergius and Bacchus." Since 2019 the church serves as a cathedral for the Ukrainian Catholic Apostolic Exarchate of Italy.

== Early churches of Sts. Sergius and Bacchus in Rome ==
The Liber Pontificalis attests four institutes in Rome by the ninth century dedicated to Sts Sergius and Bacchus, such was the popularity of these saints, though sometimes unclearly as to which one is meant:

- an oratory and deaconry at St. Peter's, rebuilt by Pope Gregory III (731–41) (Liber Pontificalis 92.13).
- a monastery at St. John Lateran, to which Pope Leo III (795–816) gave gifts of silver (LP 98.79) and to whose monks Pope Paschal I (817–24) assigned choir duties at the Lateran (LP 100.22).
- a deaconry in the Roman Forum, established as one of the original seven cardinal deaconries of Rome in 678 by Pope Agatho (678–681). This church, founded on its own ground in the Forum and not on the foundation of another building, was situated just under the Capitoline Hill between the Temple of Concord and the Temple of Vespasian and Titus. The Temple of Concord in the Roman Forum had served the church as a diaconia until it began to collapse by 790 AD. Pope Adrian I (772–95) rebuilt it after the collapse of the Temple of Concord (LP 97.90). Pope Paul III (1534–49) began demolishing it about 1536 and the church was suppressed as a cardinal deaconry, vacant from 1559, in 1587 by Pope Sixtus V (1585–1590). Demolition was mostly completed during the term of Pope Paul V (1605–1621), though parts of the apse remained until 1812.
- the church and monastery of Sergius and Bacchus in Callinico.

== Original 9th-century church ==
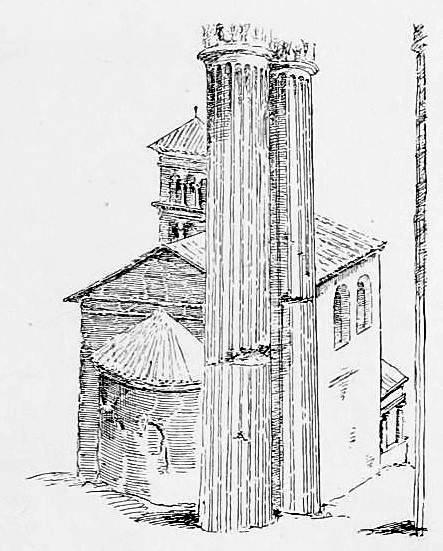
The cardinal deaconry in the Roman Forum. The foreground columns are of the Temple of Vespasian. Drawing by Maarten van Heemskerck (about 1536) from Rodolfo Amedeo Lanciani The ruins and excavations of ancient Rome: a companion book for students and travelers (1897).

The first unambiguous references to the predecessor of the church in Monti are to an "oratory of Sts. Sergius and Bacchus which is located in Callinico," to which Pope Leo III (795–816) gave gifts (LP 98.24, 98.78), and the "monastery of Christ’s holy martyrs Sergius and Bacchus called Callinicum" to which Pope Benedict III (855–858) gave silver gifts including two chalices, a paten and incense boat (LP 106.26). Callinicum is a city in Syria. The ninth century monastery was under the authority of St. Paul's Outside the Walls.

In the eleventh century the monastery was populated by Benedictine monks, known in the Catalogue of Turin as the "Church of St. Sergius in Suburra." Suburra is an ancient and modern name of the neighborhood.

A bull of 1045 of Pope Gregory VI (1045–6) put under the authority of the monastery of St. Peter of Perugia "the monastery of St. Sergius, which is called Canelicum, situated in the fourth region of Rome in the Subura, with the church of St. Euphemia located near it." Canelicum is evidently a scribal metathesis for Callinicum and should not be taken as another name for the monastery. Monti is here being referred to by the Augustan region number.

In 1413, the church of Sts Sergius and Bacchus stopped being associated with a monastery, since the Benedictine abbot and monks were replaced by an archpriest and secular clerics. By 1500 there were two chapels in the church, one to Sant'Angelo and one to San Nicolò, with construction patronized by the Monti, the Paulelli and the dello Ciuoto.

== 17th century ==
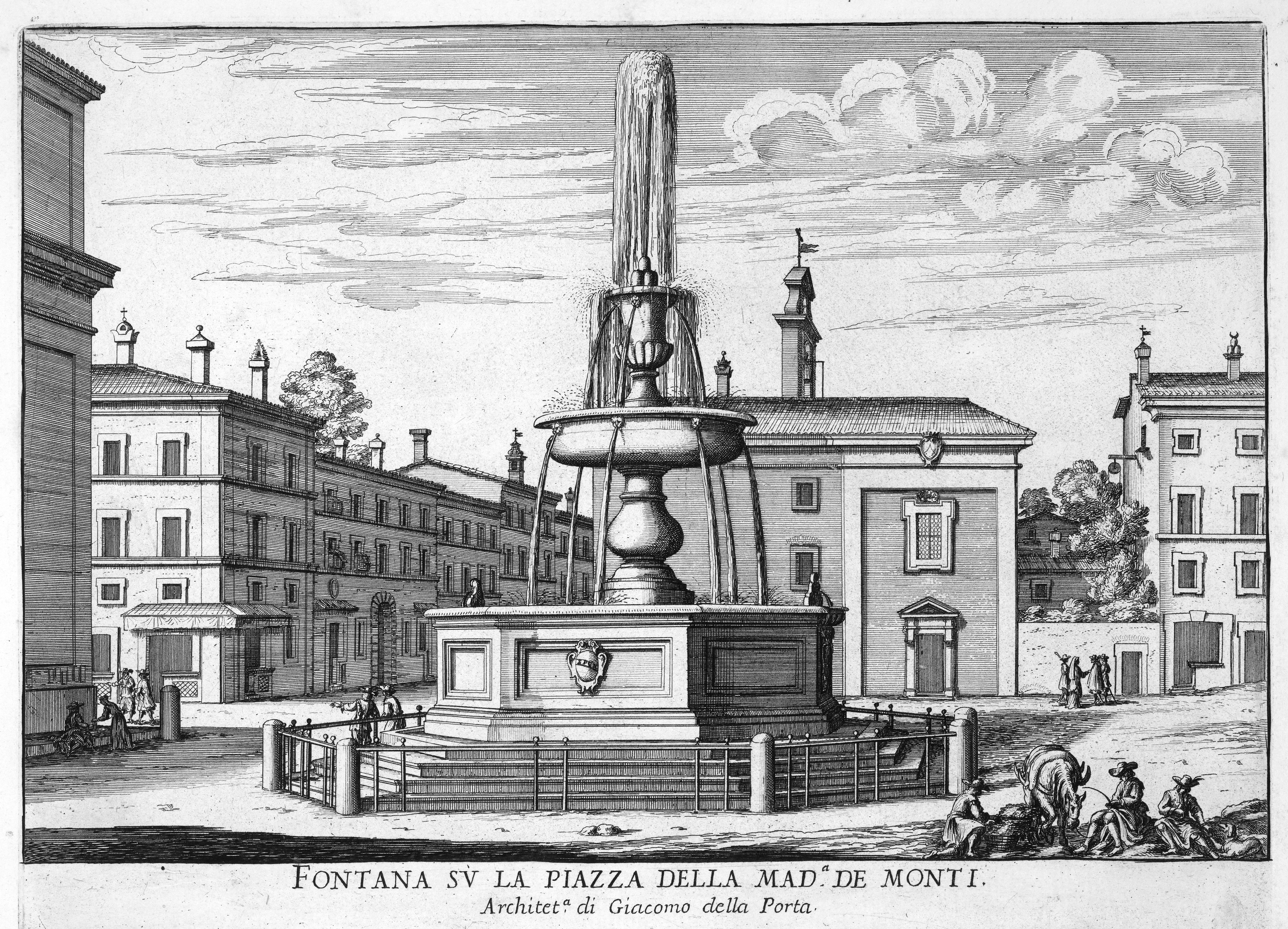
Santi Sergio e Bacco in Piazza Madonna dei Monti with Fontana dei Catecumeni in front from Giovanni Battista Falda Le Fontane di Roma (about 1670)

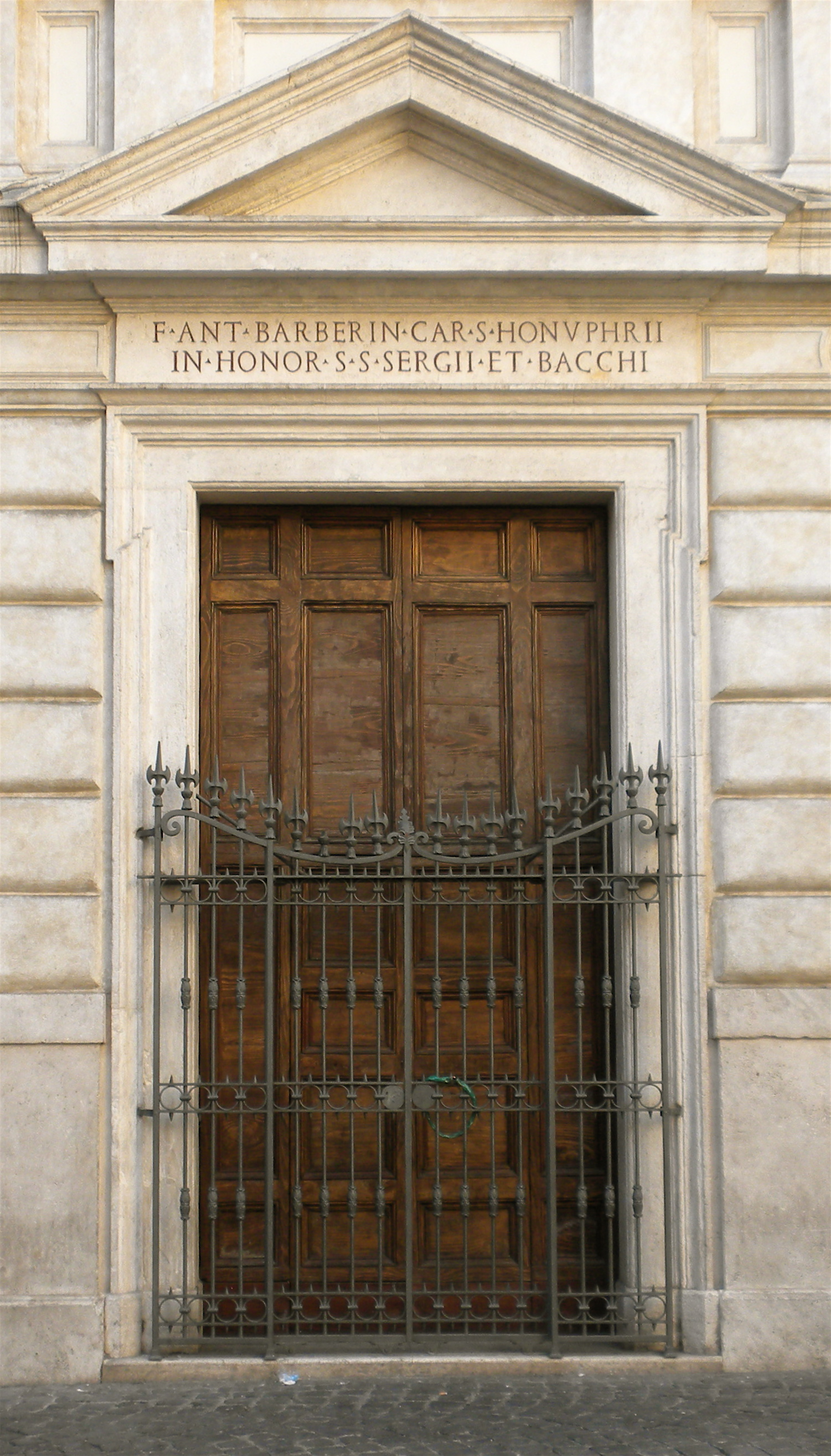
Early 17th century doorway.

In 1587, when the church of Sts Sergius and Bacchus in the Roman Forum was suppressed as a cardinal deaconry, and the church demolished, it was succeeded by a renovated Sts Sergius and Bacchus in Monti. In 1622 it was entrusted by Pope Gregory XV (1621–23) to the Minim Friars of St. Francis of Paola who soon left it when they moved to another church near San Pietro in Vincoli. The church was renovated under Pope Urban VIII (1623–44), through the patronage of his younger brother, Capuchin Cardinal Antonio Marcello Barberini (1569–1646, cardinal from 1624). Above the travertine doorway, the only part of the seventeenth century façade surviving today, is an inscription that records this work:

FECIT ANTONIUS BARBERINI CARDINALIS SANCTI ONOPHRII
IN HONOREM SS. SERGII ET BACCHI

Cardinal Antonio Barberini, titular of Sant'Onofrio al Gianicolo,
in honor of Saints Sergius and Bacchus did this work.

In 1641, Urban VIII granted the church to monks of the Order of Saint Basil the Great, the Ruthenian Monks of St. Basil as they were known, who established a college there. It has been a church of the Byzantine rite associated with the Ukrainian Greek Catholic Church ever since.

== 18th century ==
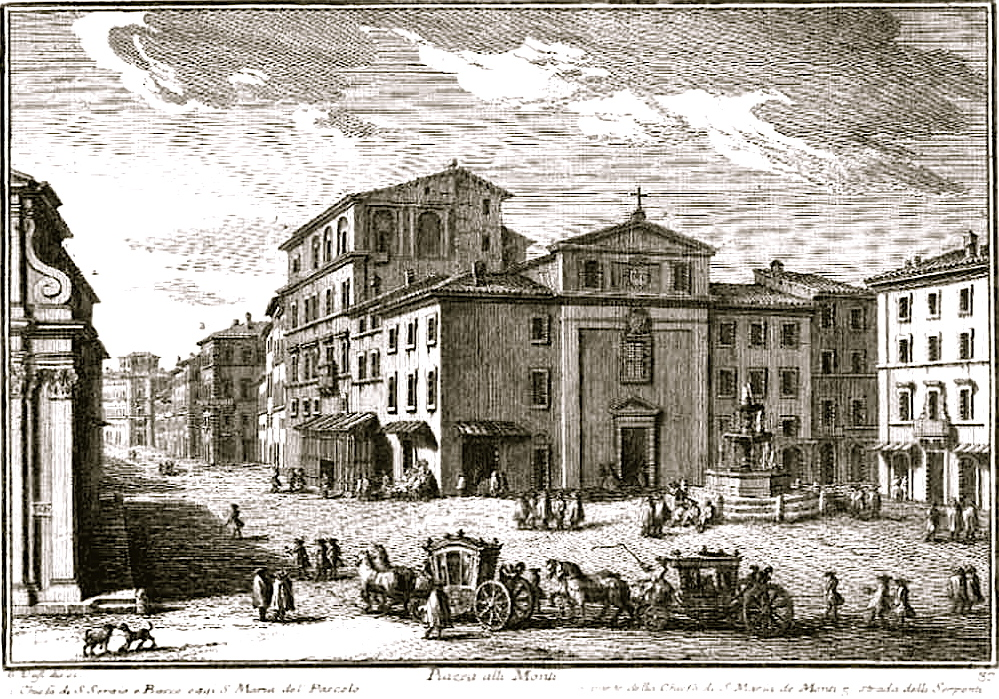
Santi Sergio e Bacco in Piazza Madonna dei Monti from Giuseppe Vasi, Vedute di Roma (1746–1761).

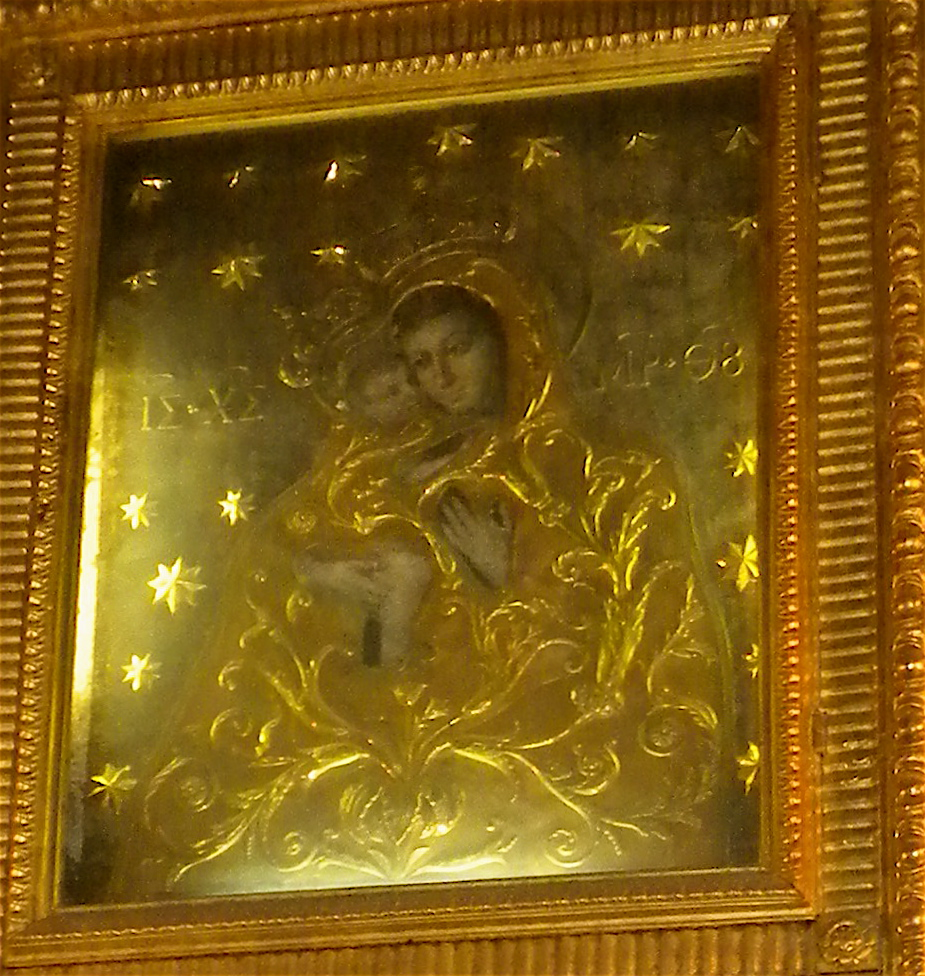
The Madonna del Pascolo.

In 1718 an icon of Madonna and child is said to have been discovered under the plaster of a wall in the adjacent sacristy building and the next year it was removed and installed above the main altar of Sts. Sergius and Bacchus at the order of Pope Clement XI (1700–21). The icon is a copy of an icon venerated at a Marian shrine in Zyrowice, a town now in Belarus, known as Our Lady of Zyrowice or Our Lady of the Pasture. That icon is said to have miraculously descended from the heavens in 1480 in the sight of a group of shepherds pasturing their animals. Sts. Sergius and Bacchus in Rome has thereafter also been called Madonna del Pascolo (Madonna of the Pasture).

Using designs formulated by Francesco Ferrari in the first years of the 18th century, starting in 1741 reconstruction and redecoration of the church was undertaken to honor of the image of the Madonna. The interior received the appearance it has today. Behind a modern wrought iron iconostasis, the high altar is set off by two fluted columns of verde antico marble with bronze Corinthian capitals designed by Filippo Barigioni (1690 –1753), a Roman artist who did other projects for Clement XI. On either side of the main altar are paintings by the Bavarian Ignazio Stern (1680–1748), one of Sts Sergius and Bacchus and one of St Basil. On the ceiling is an Assumption, including Sts Sergius and Bacchus in glory, by Sebastiano Ceccarini (Italian, 1703-1783).

Romanian Greek Catholic Inocenţiu Micu-Klein, Bishop of Blaj, died in Rome September 23, 1768, was buried at Santi Sergio e Bacco, and was remembered by memorial plaques in the church in Latin and Romanian. His remains rested there until 1997 when they were transferred to Holy Trinity Cathedral in Blaj, as he had wished.

Jordan Mickiewicz, superior of the Ruthenian monks of St. Basil, in 1819 recorded by inscription that Pope Pius VII (1800–23) in 1801 solemnly venerated the Madonna del Pascolo, which Clement XI had installed here.

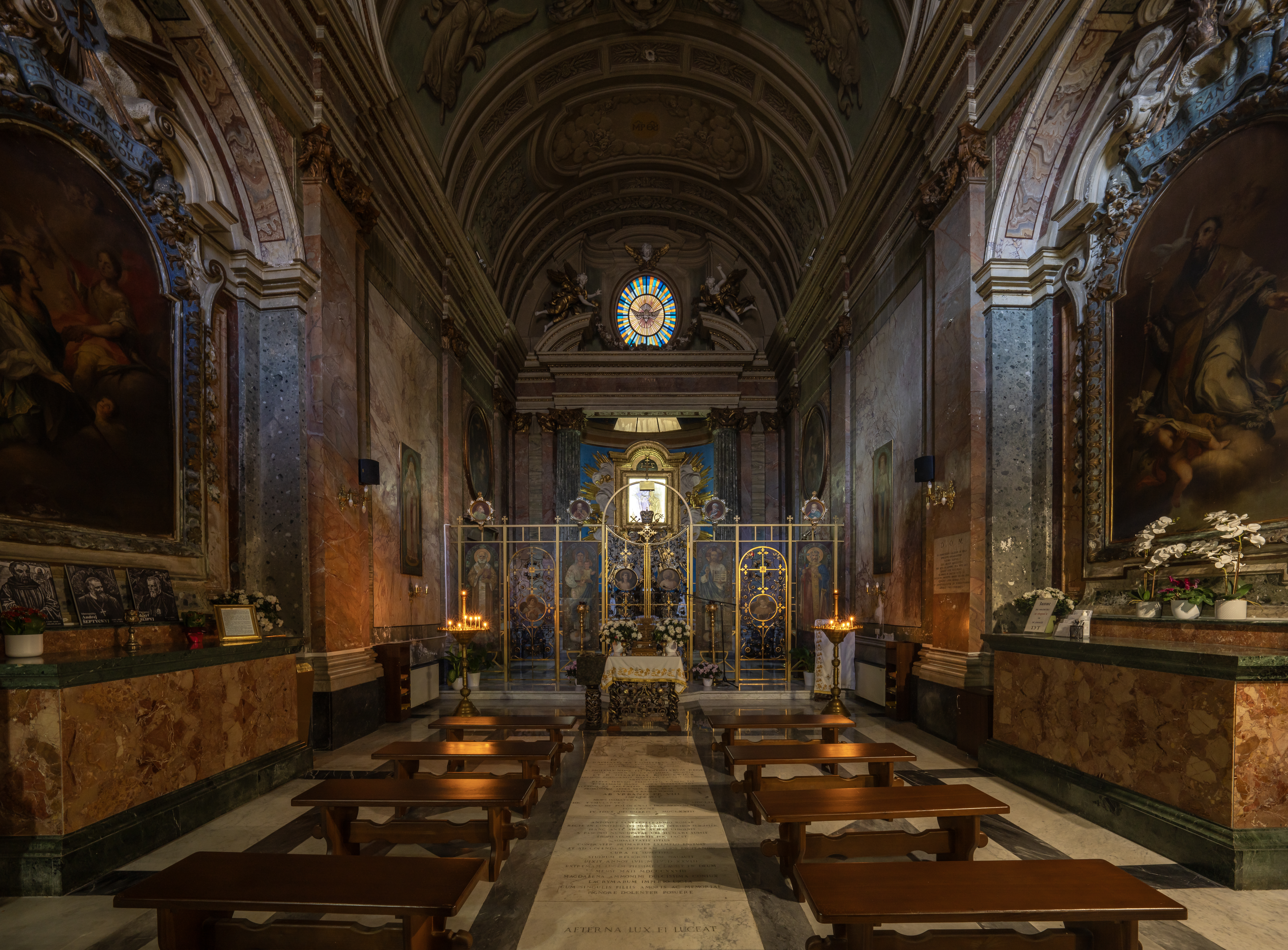
Interior of the church.

== Late 19th and 20th century ==
In 1897, Pope Leo XIII (1878–1903) reorganized the Byzantine Rite Greek Pontifical College in Rome and established a Ruthenian Pontifical College, assigning to it the church of Sts. Sergius and Bacchus. On this occasion, Leo remodeled the façade, giving it the form it has today. Added were four niches with statues of the four Great Doctors of the Eastern Church: Sts. John Chrysostom, Basil, Gregory of Nazianzus, and Athanasius.

The middle inscription on the façade records this work:

LEO XIII PONTIFEX MAXIMUS INSTAURANDUM CURAVIT ANNO DOMINI MDCCCLXXXXVI

Below the inscription are the coats of arms of Pope Leo XIII on the left and of the Order of St. Basil on the right.

In 1970, among several Ukrainian Catholic institutions he founded in Rome, Ukrainian Catholic Major Archbishop Cardinal Josyf Slipyj established Sts. Sergius and Bacchus as a Ukrainian national parish and the attached college and dormitory next door became a guest hotel for Ukrainian pilgrims. The upper inscription on the façade records the work done in 1969–73:

RESTITUIT ET RESTAURAVIT IOSEPH CARDINALIS SLIPYI ANNO MCMLXIX MCMLXXIII

Cardinal Slipyj's coat of arms was also added to the tympanum of the uppermost pediment.

Temporarily from 1971, the church's buildings hosted the Museum of Art of the Ukrainian Catholic University in Rome. Through the 1980s, the chancery in exile of the Primate of the Ukrainian Catholic Church was located at Sts. Sergius and Bacchus. Through the last years of Cardinal Slipyj, who died in 1984 aged 92, and the years of Myroslav Ivan Lubachivsky, who was appointed Slipyj's coadjutor bishop as Archbishop of Lviv in 1979, succeeded him at his death, and was made cardinal in 1985, the chancery was a central point in the West for contact with the underground Ukrainian Catholic Church in Ukraine and for advocating religious freedom under the Soviets, particularly at the time of Mikhail Gorbachev's policy of perestroika. Lubachivsky returned from exile to Lviv in 1991.

The church and its guest accommodation hosted celebrations for the installation as Cardinal of Lubomyr Husar in 2001, Major Archbishop of Kyiv-Halychyna.

The guest hotel, named St. Sophia, is conducted by a community of Ukrainian Greek Catholic nuns, the Sisters Catechists of Saint Anne.

== Cardinal deacons of Sts. Sergius and Bacchus in the Roman Forum ==
Sts. Sergius and Bacchus in the Roman Forum was a cardinal deaconry from 678 to its suppression in 1587. Its cardinal deacons included:

- Dauferius or Desiderius, O.S.B. (1058–1059). Abbot of Monte Cassino and Pope Victor III (1086–7)
- Aldo da Ferentino (1111–c. 1121)
- Gregorio Tarquini (1123–1145)
- Centius (1145–1147)
- Grecus (1149)
- Joannes (1150–1158)
- Bernardus (1160–1161)
- Vitellius (1166–1175)
- Guilelmus (1172–1173)
- Ottaviano di Paoli (1182–1189)
- Lotario de' Conti di Segni (1190–1198), Pope Innocent III (1198–1216)
- Ottaviano dei Conti di Segni (1205–1231)
- Gabriele Rangone, O.F.M. Obs. (1477–1486)
- Maffeo Gherardi, O.S.B. Cam. (1489–1492)
- Giuliano Cesarini, iuniore (1493–1503)

- In June 1503, Pope Alexander VI elevated Ss. Sergius and Bacchus to the rank of titular church, and appointed Cardinal Francisco Desprats as its cardinal-priest. He died on 9 September 1504.
- Gianstefano Ferrero (1505–1510), Cardinal-priest

- Alessandro Cesarini (Sr.) (1517–1523)
- Odet de Coligny de Châtillon (1533–1549)
- Vitellozzo Vitelli (1557–1559)

== See also ==
- Sant'Atanasio
- Santa Sofia a Via Boccea

== Gallery ==
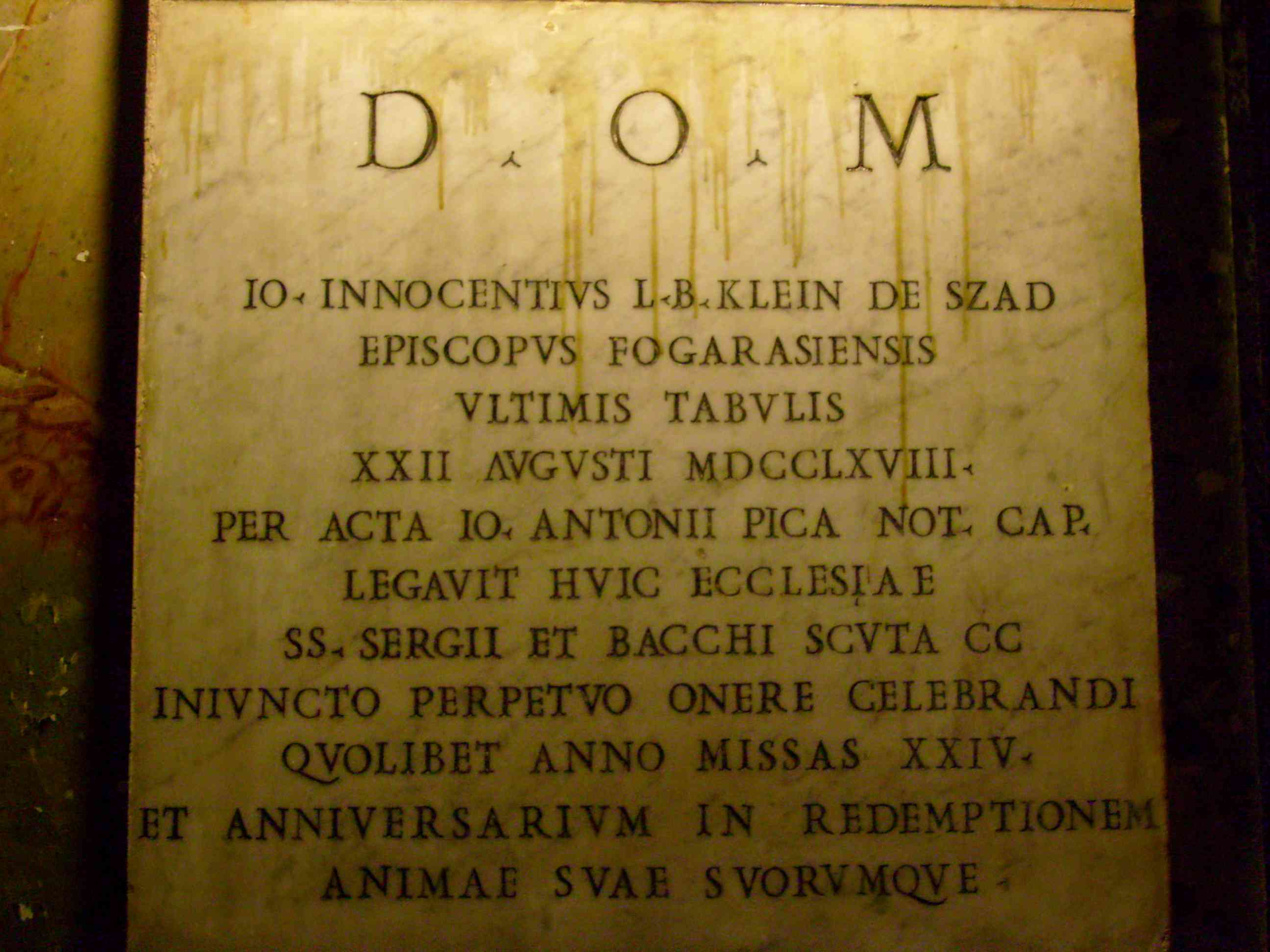
Latin memorial to Bishop Inocenţiu Micu-Klein placed by his nephew Samuil Micu after his death in 1768.

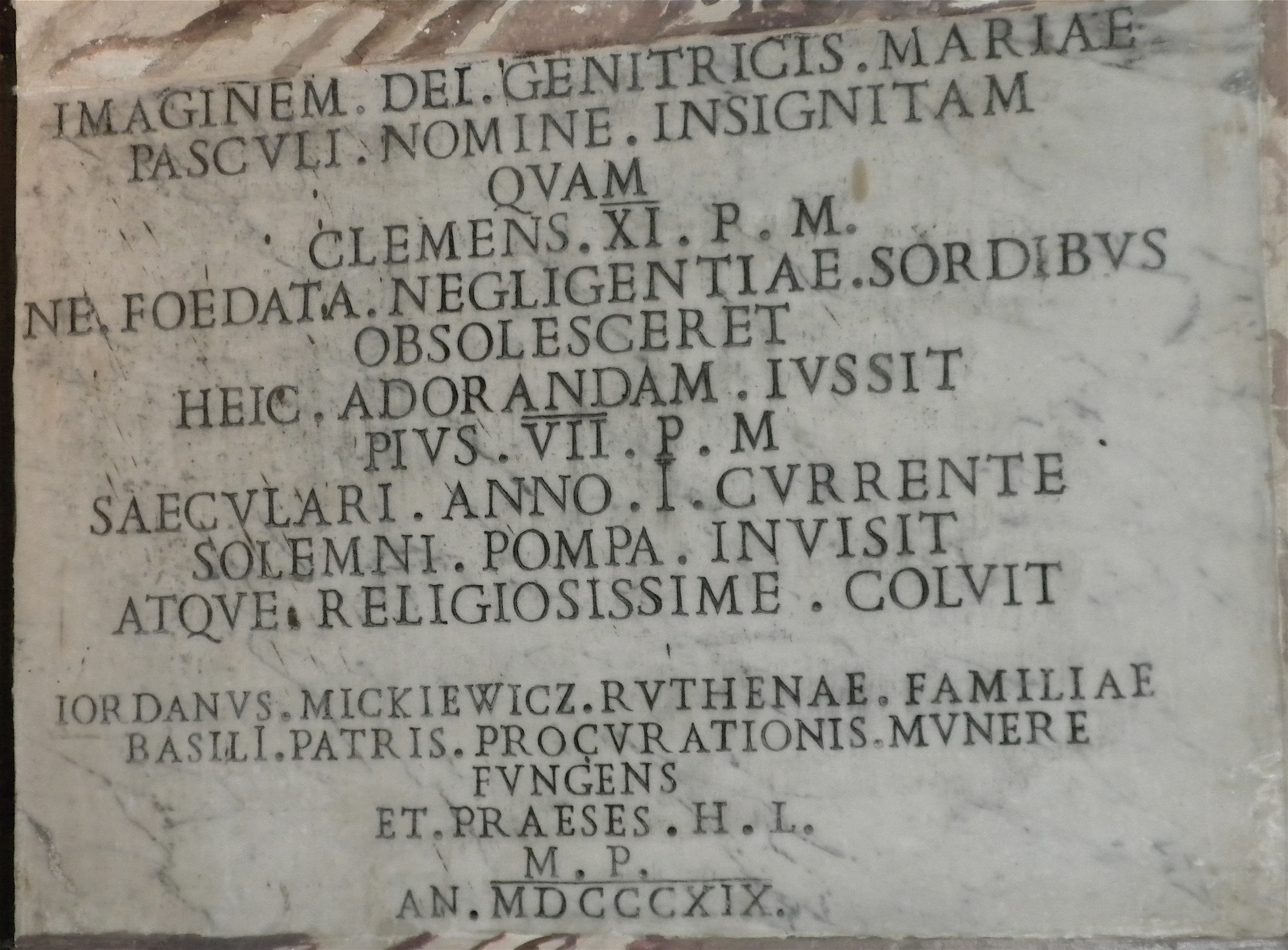
1819 inscription placed by Basilian superior Jordan Mickiewicz recording Pope Clement XI’s installation of the Madonna del Pascolo and a pilgrimage by Pope Pius VII in 1801.

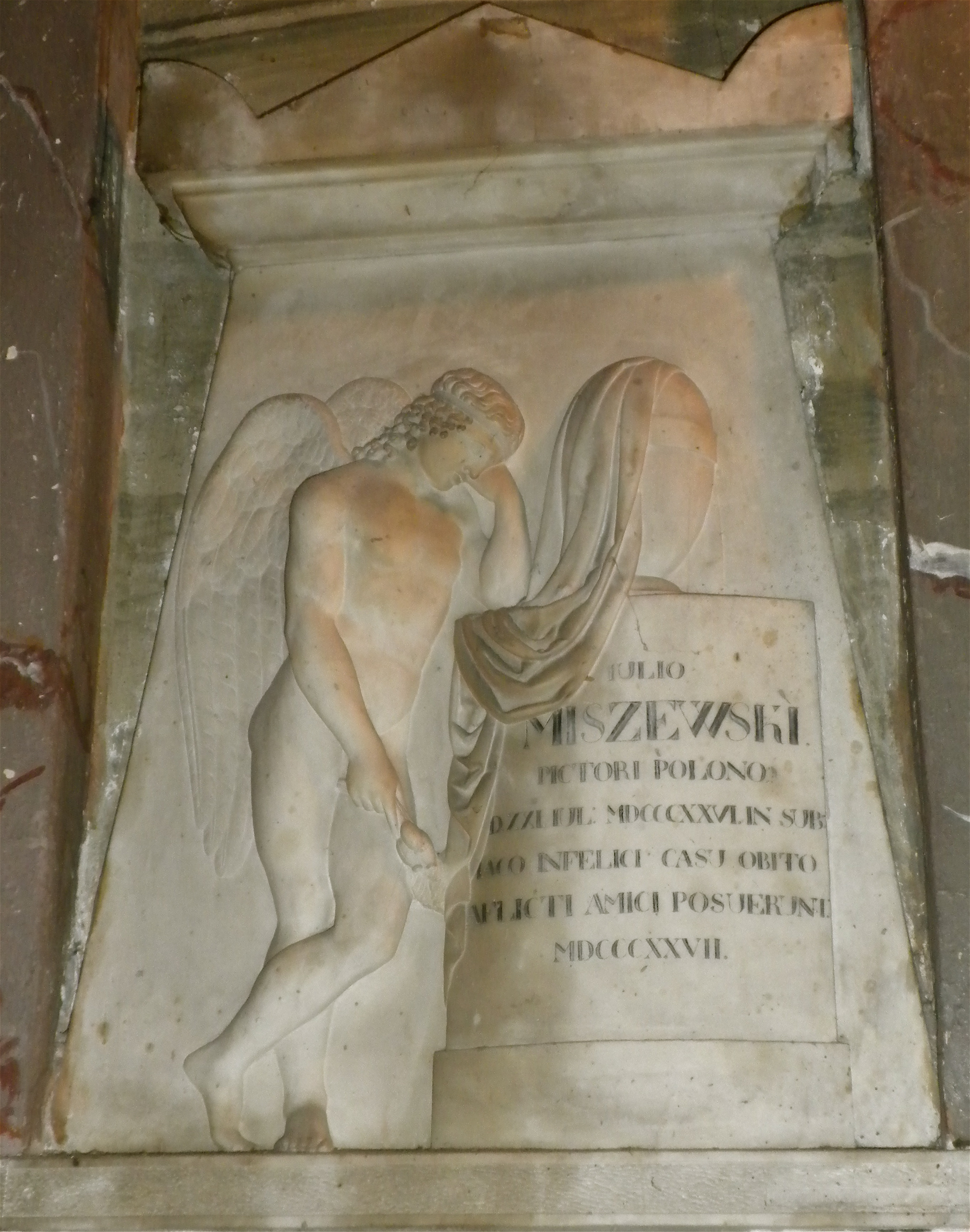
1827 Memorial to Juliusz Miszewski, Polish painter, who died July 21, 1826, in an accident in Subiaco.

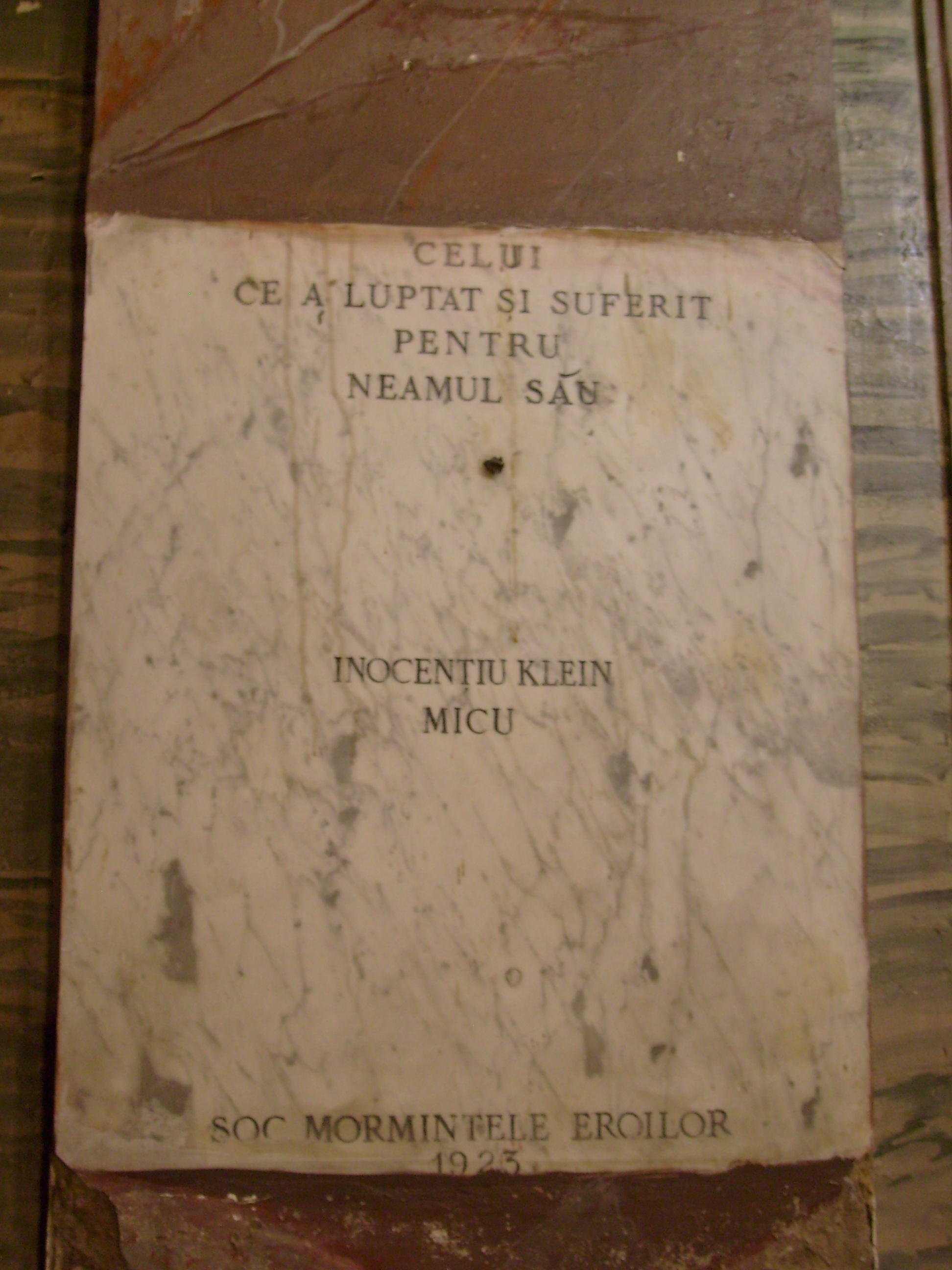
1923 Romanian memorial to Bishop Micu-Klein.

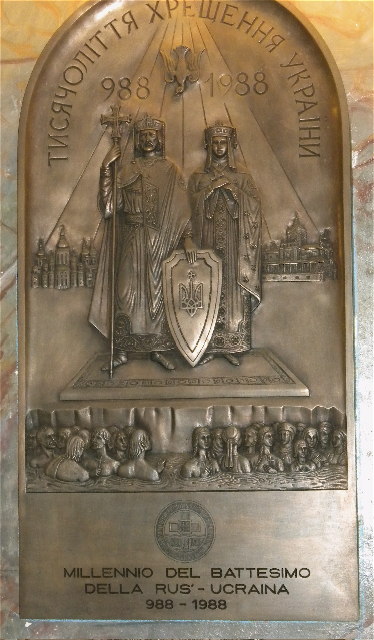
Plaque observing 1000 years of Christianity in Ukraine.

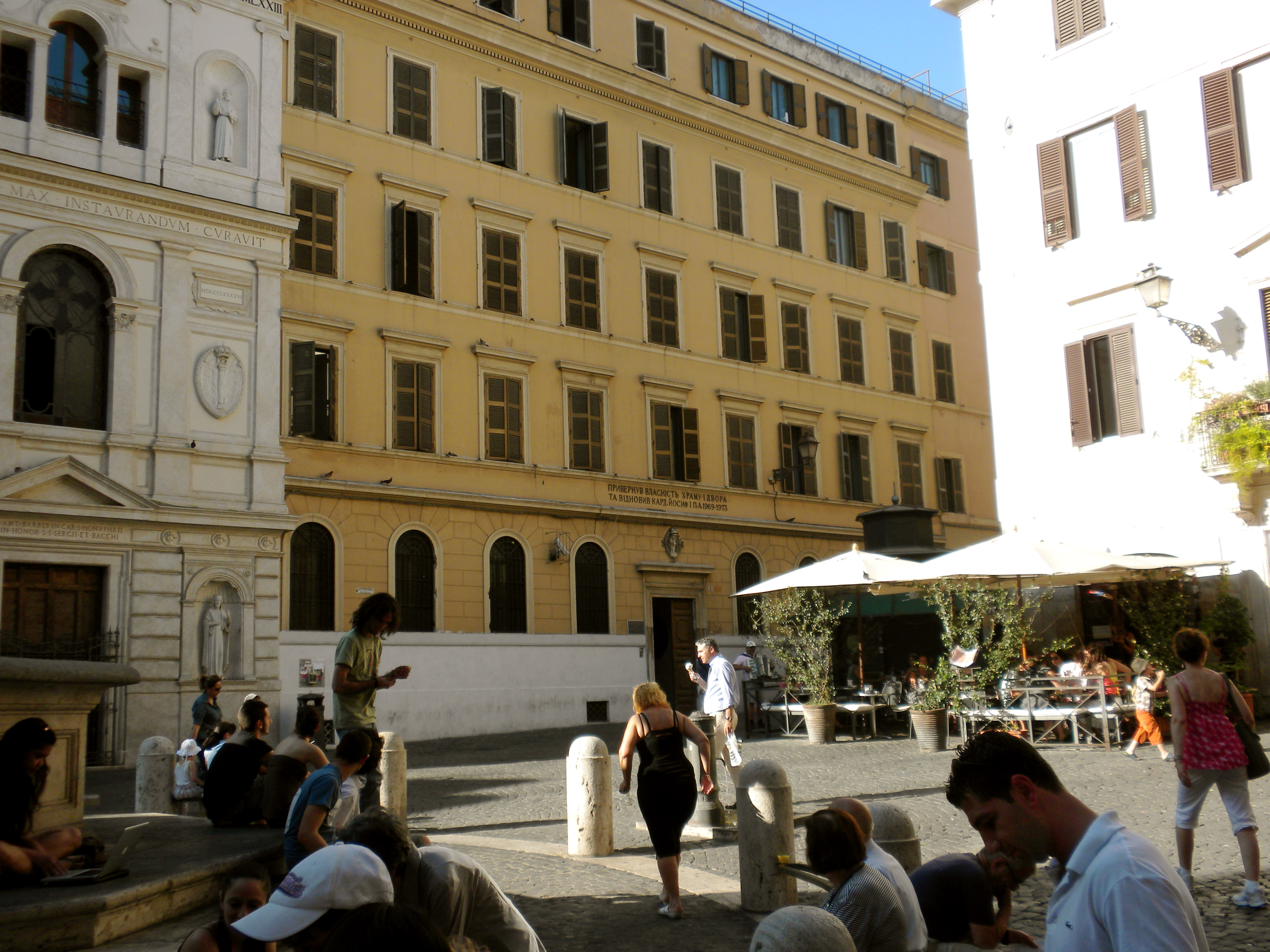
St. Sophia guest hotel was adjacent to Ss. Sergio e Bacco in Piazza Madonna dei Monti.

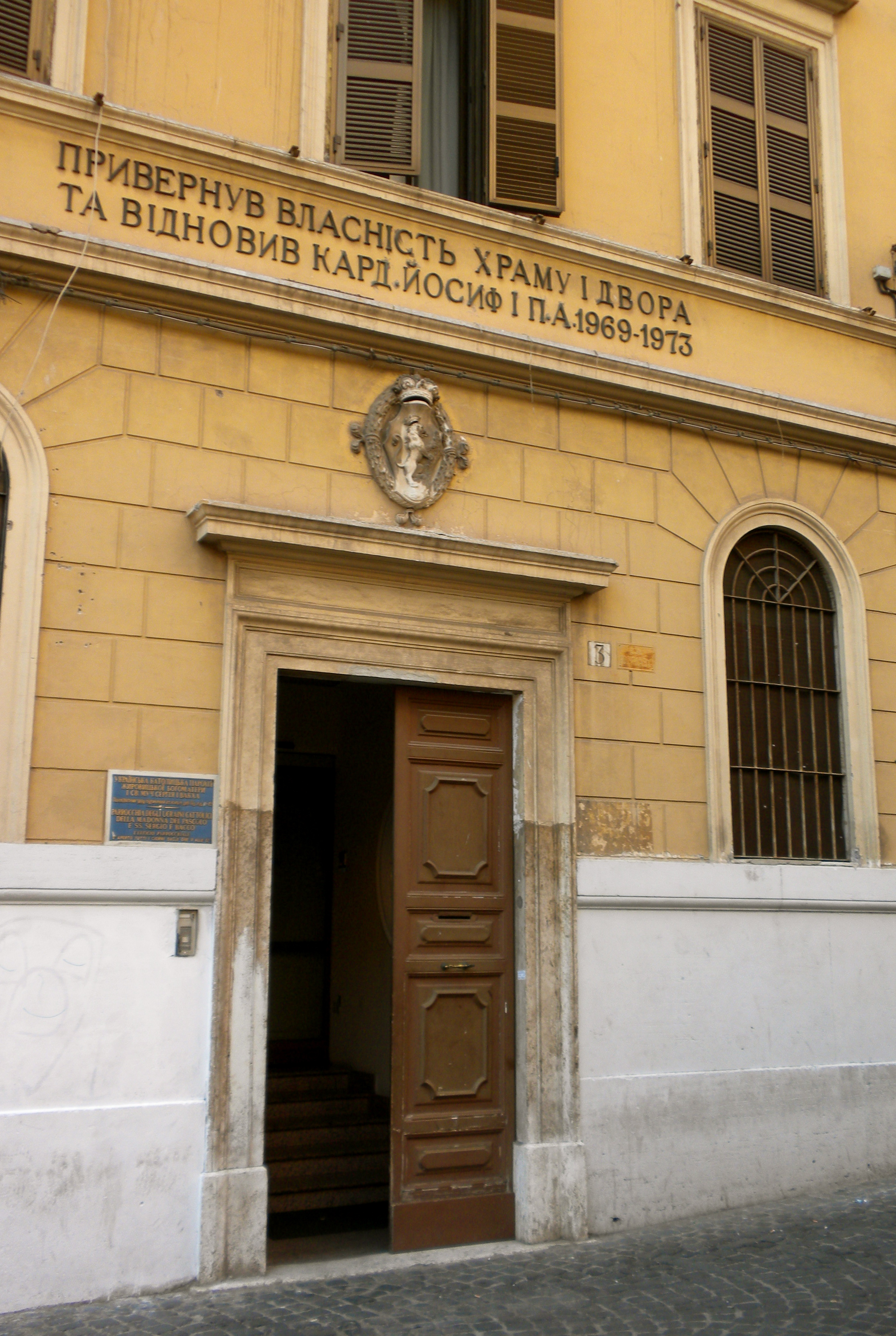
Guest hotel doorway with inscription recording renovation of 1969–73.
