= Guido de Castro Ficeclo =

Guido de Castro Ficeclo (died 1147) was Italian Cardinal Deacon of S. Apollinare created by pope Innocent II in 1139. In 1139, he was governor of Benevento. He subscribed the papal bulls between 27 March 1140 and 27 December 1146. From 1142 until 1144, he served as papal legate in the Duchy of Bohemia. He participated in the papal election, 1145.

== Bibliography ==
- Luchesius Spätling, Kardinal Guido und seine Legation in Böhmen-Mären, in: Mitteilungen des Instituts für österreichische Geschichtsforschung, Universitäts Wien Institut für Geschichtsforschung und Archivwissenschaft in Wien, 1958, p. 306-330
