= Pope Celestine II =

Head of the Catholic Church from 1143 to 1144

- Bishop of Rome
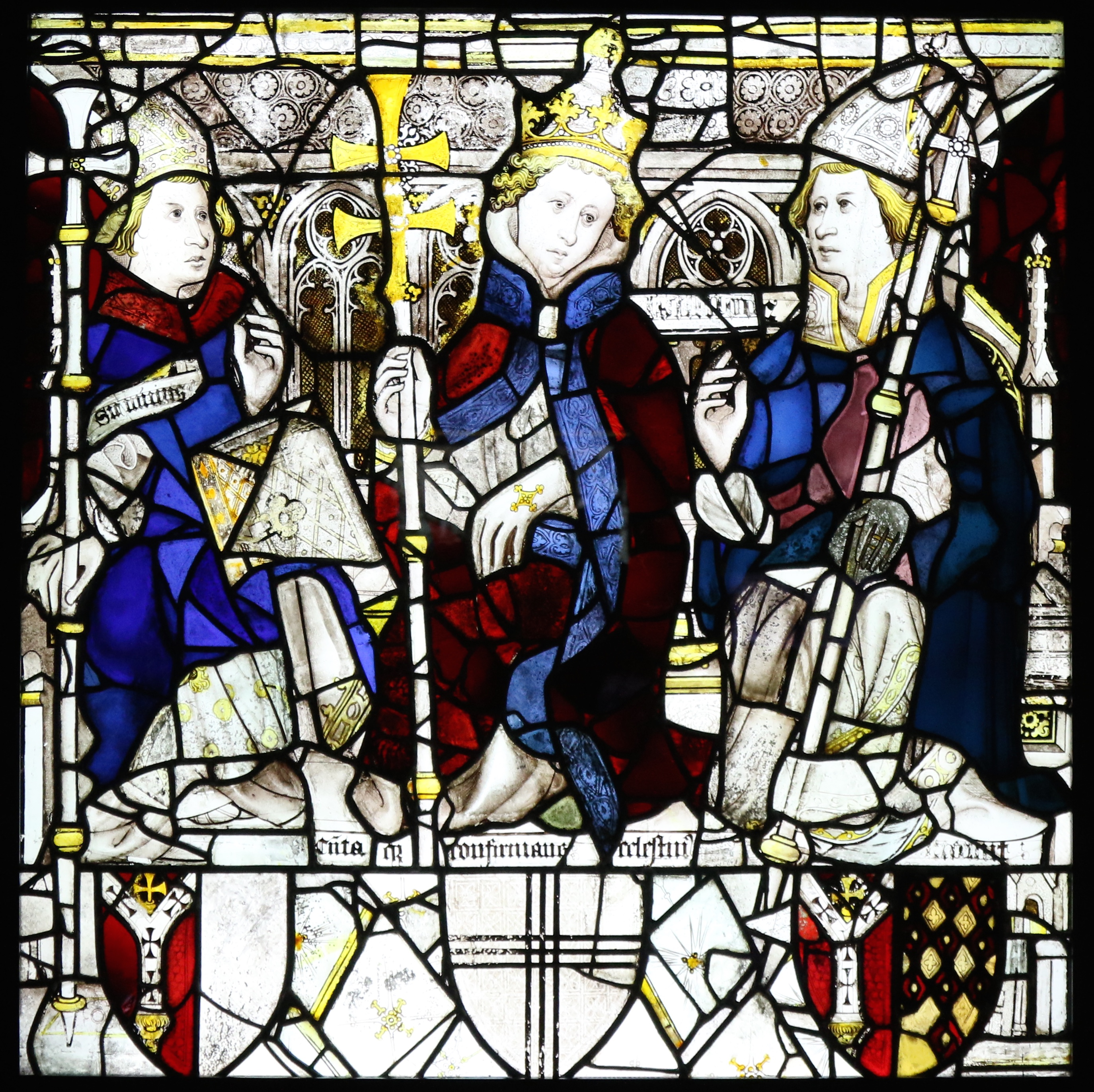
- Celestine II (center) with Saint William of York (right) and an unknown English bishop (left)
- Church: Catholic Church
- Papacy began: 26 September 1143
- Papacy ended: 8 March 1144
- Predecessor: Innocent II
- Successor: Lucius II

Orders
- Consecration: 3 October 1143 by Alberic of Ostia
- Created cardinal: December 1127 by Honorius II

Personal details
- Born: Guido di Castello Città di Castello, Papal States, Holy Roman Empire
- Died: 8 March 1144 Rome, Papal States, Holy Roman Empire
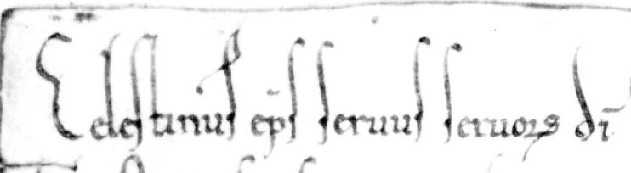
- Signature

Pope Celestine II (Latin: Caelestinus II; died 8 March 1144), born Guido di Castello, was head of the Catholic Church and ruler of the Papal States from 26 September 1143 to his death on 8 March 1144.

== Early life ==
Guido di Castello, possibly the son of a local noble, Niccolo di Castello, was born either in Città di Castello, situated in Paterna Santa Felicità upon the Apennines, or at Macerata in the March of Ancona.

Guido had studied under Pierre Abélard, and eventually became a distinguished master in the schools. Eventually Guido began his career in Rome as a subdeacon and a scriptor apostolicus under Pope Callixtus II. He was created Cardinal-Deacon of Santa Maria in Via Lata by Pope Honorius II in 1127; as such, he signed the papal bulls issued between 3 April 1130 and 21 December 1133. In the double papal election of 1130 he joined the obedience of Pope Innocent II. In December 1133 Innocent promoted him to the rank of Cardinal-Priest of San Marco. He signed the papal bulls as S.R.E. indignus sacerdos between 11 January 1134 and 16 May 1143. As the cardinal of San Marco's, he supported Innocent's claims with regard to Monte Cassino, and as a mark of his confidence in him, Innocent made Guido the rector of Benevento. Afterwards, he made him a papal legate to France in 1140.

He participated in the papal election of 1143, the first undisturbed papal election that Rome had seen for eighty-two years, and was elected pope two days after the death of Innocent II, on 25 September 1143, taking the name of Celestine.

== Papacy ==
Celestine II governed the Catholic Church for only five months and thirteen days from his election until his death on 8 March 1144. Upon his accession he wrote to Peter the Venerable and the monks of Cluny, asking them to pray for him, while he was congratulated by Arnulf of Lisieux. Regardless of the brevity of his reign, he was prepared to chart a very different course from that of his predecessor. He was opposed to Innocent II's concessions to King Roger II of Sicily and refused to ratify the Treaty of Mignano ("a foolish policy, which he survived – just – long enough to regret"). He was in favor of the Plantagenets' claim to the English throne, and was therefore opposed to King Stephen of England. To emphasise this shift, he refused to renew the legatine authority that Innocent II had granted to King Stephen's brother, Henry of Blois. Celestine also favored the Templars, ordering a general collection for them, as well as the Hospitallers, giving them control of the hospital of Saint Mary Teutonicorum in Jerusalem.

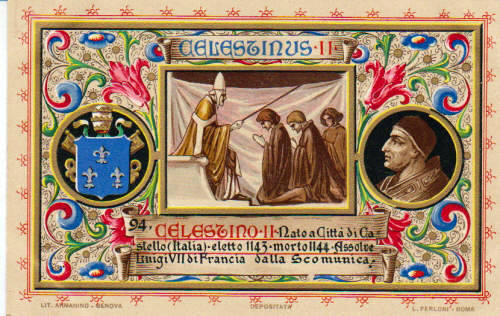
19th-century religious card depicting Celestine's absolution of King Louis VII of France.

The principal act of his papacy was the absolution of Louis VII of France. King Louis had refused to accept the nomination of Pierre de la Chatre as the archbishop of Bourges, who went to see Innocent II to have his nomination confirmed. When Pierre returned to France in 1142, Louis refused him permission to enter his episcopal city, causing Pierre to flee to the court of Count Theobald II of Champagne. Innocent responded by placing France under an interdict. For two years, the various parties remained at loggerheads while Bernard of Clairvaux attempted to mediate the dispute. With the election of Celestine, both Bernard and Theobald appealed to the pope, while Louis sent ambassadors to have the interdict lifted. Louis agreed to accept Pierre as the legitimate archbishop of Bourges, and in return, Celestine removed the sentence of interdict.

Celestine died on 8 March 1144 in the monastery of Saint Sebastian on the Palatine hill and was buried in the south transept of the Lateran. Celestine's heraldic badge was a lozengy shield of argent and gules.

Celestine II is the first pope listed in the Prophecies of St Malachy.

== See also ==
- List of popes
- Cardinals created by Celestine II

== Sources ==
- Thomas, P. C., A Compact History of the Popes, St Pauls BYB, 2007
- Mann, Horace K., The Lives of the Popes in the Middle Ages, Vol 9 (1925)

Catholic Church titles
Preceded by Innocent II	Pope; 1143–44	Succeeded by Lucius II
