= Pope Lucius II =

Head of the Catholic Church from 1144 to 1145

- Bishop of Rome
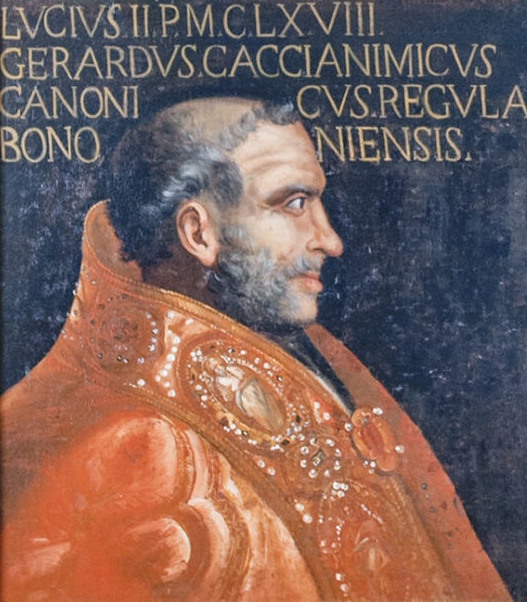
- Fresco at the Palazzo Altieri, c. 1661
- Church: Catholic Church
- Papacy began: 9 March 1144
- Papacy ended: 15 February 1145
- Predecessor: Celestine II
- Successor: Eugene III

Orders
- Consecration: 12 March 1144 by Alberic of Ostia
- Created cardinal: December 1122 by Callixtus II

Personal details
- Born: Gherardo Caccianemici dal Orso Bologna, Papal States, Holy Roman Empire
- Died: 15 February 1145 Rome, Papal States, Holy Roman Empire
- Coat of arms

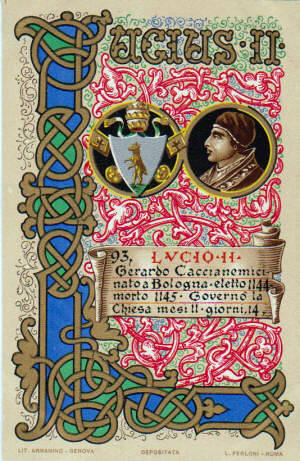
19th-century religious card depicting Lucius II

Pope Lucius II (died 15 February 1145), born Gherardo Caccianemici dal Orso, was head of the Catholic Church and ruler of the Papal States from 9 March 1144 to his death in 1145. His pontificate was notable for the unrest in Rome associated with the Commune of Rome and its attempts to wrest control of the city from the papacy. He supported Empress Matilda's claim to the Kingdom of England in the Anarchy, and had a tense relationship with King Roger II of Sicily.

== Early life ==
Gherardo Caccianemici dal Orso, the son of Orso Caccianemici was born in Bologna. He was for many years a canon of the Basilica di San Frediano before his elevation by Pope Honorius II to cardinal priest of Santa Croce in Gerusalemme in 1124. During this time there he renovated the basilica, attached a body of regular canons and improved its revenue stream. After his election as pope, he presented to the church a copy of the Gospels bound with plates of gold and adorned with jewels, as well as an altar-cover and two chased silver-gilt ampullae for use at Mass. Honorius also appointed him the librarian of the Diocese of Rome before appointing him papal legate in Germany in 1125. While there, he helped support the candidacy of Holy Roman Emperor Lothair III as well as appointing Saint Norbert of Xanten as the Archbishop of Magdeburg. In 1128, Gherardo was sent to Benevento to govern the city, which had overthrown the previous rector.

In 1130 he was again appointed legate to Germany by Pope Innocent II, where he was instrumental in convincing Lothair III to make two expeditions to Italy for the purpose of protecting Pope Innocent II against the Antipope Anacletus II. He had a further period as legate to Germany in 1135–36. He was one of the principal negotiators with Lothair III in attempting to force the monks of Monte Cassino to submit themselves to the authority of the papacy. In addition, he was sent to Salerno to negotiate the end of the schism involving Anacletus II with King Roger II of Sicily. As a principal supporter of Pope Innocent II, the pope rewarded him for his efforts by appointing him papal chancellor. After the papal election of 1144, Gherardo was elected as Lucius II and consecrated on 12 March 1144. He probably took his name in honor of Pope Lucius I, who was commemorated a few days prior to Gherardo's consecration.

== Pontificate ==
=== Relations with England and Portugal ===
Lucius was involved in the usual running of church business throughout medieval Christendom. In England, he granted a number of privileges to bishops, monasteries and churches, including exempting the monastery of St. Edmund from all subjection to the secular authorities. He also dispatched a papal legate, Igmarus (or Hincmar), to England, charged to investigate the request of Bernard, Bishop of St David's, to elevate his see to the rank of metropolitan bishop, and to take the pallium to Archbishop William of York. Regarding the political situation in England, he took the side of the Empress Matilda over the rights to the English crown.

Early in his reign, Lucius received a request from prominent members of the town of Lucca to become the suzerain of the castle within the town in order to protect it from the war between Lucca and Pisa. Lucius received it on 18 March 1144 and, for a payment of ten pounds of gold, agreed to defend it on his behalf. Lucius then returned the castle to them as a fief.

Meanwhile, in Portugal, King Afonso I, eager to maintain the newly established independence of Portugal from the Kingdom of León, offered to do homage to Lucius, as he had done to Pope Innocent II, and to make the pope the feudal suzerain of his lands. He offered Lucius his territory and a yearly tribute of four ounces of gold in exchange for the defence and support of the Apostolic See. Although Lucius accepted Afonso's feudal homage on 1 May 1144, and excused him from appearing in person, he did not acknowledge Afonso as King of Portugal, but instead as Dux Portugallensis. The royal title would eventually be conferred by Pope Alexander III.

Finally, the city of Corneto, formally belonging to the Papal States, was restored to the papacy during Lucius’ pontificate by a formal deed on 20 November 1144.

=== Conflict with Roger II of Sicily ===
Although Lucius had been the friend of King Roger II of Sicily and godparent to one of his children, the situation between the two deteriorated. The two parties met at Ceprano in June 1144 to clarify the duties of Roger as a vassal of the Holy See. Lucius demanded the return of the principality of Capua, while Roger instead wanted additional territory that formed part of the Papal States in the south. Lucius II, on the advice of his cardinals, was unwilling to accept Roger's demands and rejected them. Infuriated, King Roger returned to Sicily and asked his son Duke Roger III of Apulia to invade Campania. Duke Roger did as he was asked, and sent his general Robert of Selby against Lucius, ravaging the country as far north as Ferentino. This forced the Romans to capitulate, and in September 1144, Lucius agreed to Roger's terms, negotiating a seven-year truce. The Normans in return withdrew back to their conquered territories and promised not to attack Benevento or any other papal territory.

=== Emergence of the Roman Commune ===
This surrender on the part of Lucius II gave an opportunity for members of the Roman Senate to reassert their ancient independence and authority and to erect a revolutionary republic at Rome which sought to deprive the pope of his temporal power. The principal groups involved in this movement were the merchants and artisans, while the urban nobility kept their neutrality.

The Senate, which practically took all temporal power from the pope during the pontificate of Innocent II, had been managed with considerable skill and firmness by Lucius at the beginning of his pontificate, convincing many senators to either leave the Capitoline Hill or to lay down their magisterium. Now, encouraged by Lucius II's defeat, the Senate, led by Giordano Pierleoni, brother of the former Antipope Anacletus II, rebelled against Lucius II, driving out the papal prefects and establishing the Commune of Rome. They demanded the pope abandon all governmental duties, and that he would retain only ecclesiastical taxes and voluntary tributes. The Senate took over powers to elect magistrates and strike its own coinage. At first, Lucius asked for Roger II's aid, but Roger, still annoyed that Lucius had not fully recognised his kingship, withheld his assistance. Lucius then turned for help to Conrad, King of the Romans, and on December 1144 wrote to him pleading for military assistance against the Senate and the Patrician Giordano Pierleoni. Lucius was supported by Bernard of Clairvaux, who also wrote to Conrad, asking for him to intervene.

While waiting for Conrad's reply, Lucius decided to take matters into his own hands. Turning to the Roman aristocracy, in particular the Frangipani family, he gave them the fortress of the Circus Maximus on 31 January 1145, allowing them complete control of the southern portion of the Palatine Hill. The Roman Forum had become a battleground, and the confusion prevented Lucius from travelling to the Aventine Hill to ordain the abbot of San Saba on 20 January 1145.

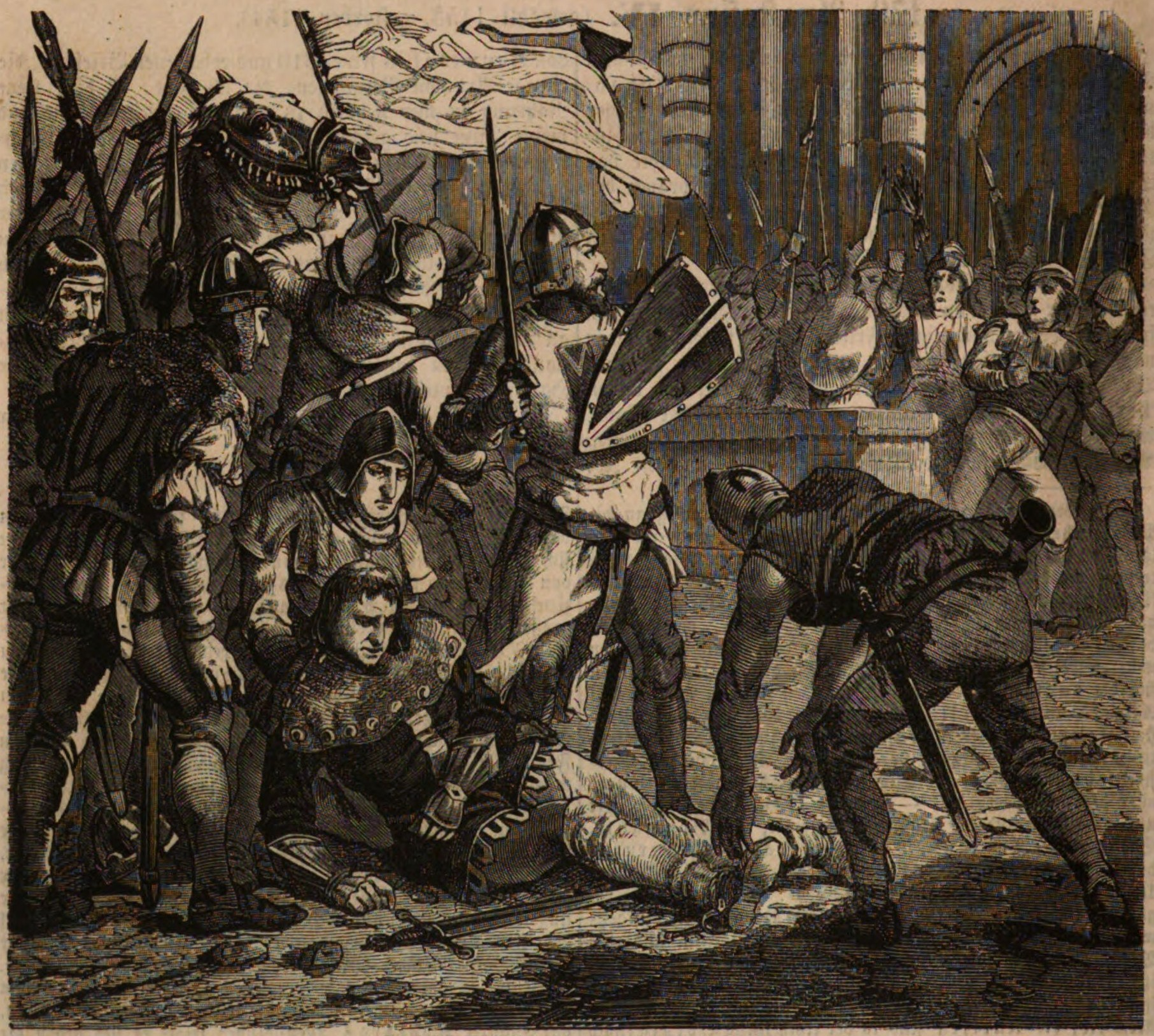
Killing of Pope Lucius II (by Franz Kollarž)

Finally, Lucius marched against the Senatorial positions on the Capitol with a small army. He was driven back by Giordano, and according to Godfrey of Viterbo, he was seriously injured during this battle (by a thrown stone). He did not recover from his injuries and died on 15 February 1145 at San Gregorio Magno al Celio, where he was under the protection of the neighbouring Frangipani fortress.

Lucius II was buried at St John Lateran in the circular portico behind the apse. His heraldic badge was a shield of argent, with a bear rampant of proper sable.

== See also ==
- List of popes
- Cardinals Created by Lucius II

== Sources ==
- Levillain, Philippe, The Papacy: An Encyclopedia, Vol II: Gaius-Proxies, Routledge, 2002
- Thomas, P. C., A Compact History of the Popes, St Pauls BYB, 2007
- Mann, Horace K., The Lives of the Popes in the Middle Ages, Vol 9 (1925)
- Herbermann, Charles, ed. (1913). "Pope Lucius II" . Catholic Encyclopedia. New York: Robert Appleton Company.
- Duffy, Eamon (2001). Saints and Sinners: A History of the Popes. Yale University Press. pp. 140–141. ISBN 978-0-300-09165-6.
- Maxwell-Stuart, P. G. (2002). Chronicle of the Popes: The Reign-by-Reign Record of the Papacy from St. Peter to the Present. Thames & Hudson. pp. 95. ISBN 978-0-500-01798-2.

Catholic Church titles
Preceded by Celestine II	Pope; 1144–45	Succeeded by Eugene III
