= Alberic of Ostia =

12th-century bishop of Ostia and diplomat

- Bishop of Ostia and Velletri
- Diocese: Ostia
- Appointed: Pope Innocent II
- In office: 1138–1148
- Predecessor: Drogo of Champagne
- Successor: Guido II de Summa
- Other post: Abbot of Vézelay Abbey (1131-1138) Cardinal Bishop of Ostia (1138-1148)

Orders
- Ordination: 1131 by Benedictines
- Consecration: 3 April 1138 by Pope Innocent II
- Created cardinal: 1138 by Pope Innocent II
- Rank: Cardinal Bishop

Personal details
- Born: 1080 Beauvais
- Died: 1148 (aged 67–68) Verdun
- Buried: Verdun Cathedral

Alberic of Ostia (1080–1148) was a Benedictine monk, diplomat and Cardinal Bishop of Ostia from 1138 to 1148. He was one of the most important people in the administration of Pope Eugene III, especially due to his diplomatic skills.

== Biography ==
=== Early life ===
Alberic was born at Beauvais in France. He entered the monastery of Cluny and became its sub-prior and, later, prior of Saint-Martin-des-Champs. In 1126, he was recalled to Cluny by Peter the Venerable, to aid in the restoration of discipline. In 1131, Alberic was abbot of Vézelay Abbey in the Diocese of Autun and attended the council of Pisa in 1135.

=== Mission to England and Bari ===
In 1138, Alberic was made Cardinal-Bishop of Ostia by Pope Innocent II. Immediately after his consecration Alberic went as papal legate to England. He was the first legate since John of Crema visited England in 1124 because legatine authority had been given to the Archbishop of Canterbury; now that the archbishop had died Innocent decided to send a new legate with Alberic. Alberic was successful in his endeavours to end the war for possession of the throne between the usurper Stephen of Blois and David I of Scotland, who had espoused the cause of Empress Matilda, and permanent peace was ratified the next year in the Second Treaty of Durham on 9 April 1139.

Alberic then visited various bishopric and abbey especially in North England and Scotland and called then for a legatine council of all the bishops and abbots of England, which assembled at Westminster in London on 11 December 1138. Eighteen bishops and about thirty abbots were present. The chief business of the council, besides some disciplinary measures and the issuing of various canons, was the election of an archbishop for the See of Canterbury. Theobald, Abbot of Bec, was chosen, and consecrated by Alberic on 24 December.

Accompanied by Theobald and other bishops and abbots, Alberic returned to Rome in January 1139. There he attended the Second Lateran Council. That same year, Alberic was sent as a legate of the Holy See to Bari, a town on the Adriatic. Bari was in revolt against Roger II of Sicily, and Alberic intended to exhort them to acknowledge him as their lawful sovereign. However, the inhabitants shut the city gates against him.

=== Mission to Outremer ===
In 1139, Alberic was appointed by Innocent II to examine into the conduct of Ralph of Domfront, Latin Patriarch of Antioch and establish deeper ties with the Armenian Church. As soon as he arrived in Antioch in November that year, he summoned a synod in the cathedral of Antioch which was attended by all Latin prelates of the east, including the patriarch of Jerusalem as well as the Armenian Catholicos Gregory III and his brother Nerses. After Ralph disobeyed three charges to appear before the synod, he was deposed and Aimery of Limoges was elected patriarch. Alberic then continued together with Gregory III to Jerusalem.

On 1 April 1141, he dedicated the Templum Domini (possibly to St. Mary) and held the next day a synod in Jerusalem. Following the decrees of this synod, the pope established the primacy of Jerusalem over Antioch and its dominion over the ecclesiastic province of Tyre. Gregory III, who was also at the synod, discussed dogma, professed a number of orthodox beliefs and promised to restore his church to union with Rome. This was an important step to establishing the union of churches that was achieved towards the end of the century.

=== Mission to France and final years ===
Alberic was back in Rome by March 1144 before leaving for France that summer. Between 1144-1145 he was active in western and northern France, dealing with ecclesiastic issues and rendering judgments. In 1145, Alberic travelled together with Hugh of Amiens, bishop of Rouen, to Nantes to preach against heresy and witness the translation of the relics of the early Christian martyrs Donatian and Rogatian. Upon Alberic's urging, Hugh wrote a treatise known as Contra haereticos sui temporis or De ecclesia et eius ministris libri tres that defended elaborately orthodoxy. That same year, Alberic commissioned Bernard of Clairvaux to travel throughout southwest France to preach against the teachings of Peter de Bruis and Henry of Lausanne.

Alberic returned to the papal court at Viterbo by mid-November 1145, just before the issue of Quantum praedecessores, and accompanied the pope during the preparation of the Second Crusade. Promoting the crusade together with Bernard of Clairvaux, he arranged with Louis VII of France the details of the undertaking.

Pope Eugene III sent Alberic in 1147 to preach against the Albigenses in the neighbourhood of Toulouse. There Alberic received a very cold welcome. The populace, in derision of his office, had gone to meet him, riding on asses, and escorted him to his residence with the music of rude instruments. Three days later, Bernard joined the embassy, and together the men were able to achieve some success. In a letter written at this time to the bishops of that district, Bernard calls Alberic "the venerable Bishop of Ostia, a man who has done great things in Israel, through whom Christ has often given victory to His Church".

Alberic died at Verdun on 20 November 1148, according to the necrology of St.-Martin-des-Champes. He was buried in Verdun Cathedral, possibly a few day of its consecration, and a couple of days later his friend Bernard of Clairvaux said mass near his grave. His Cluniac colleague Hugh of Amiens dedicated one of his earlier works to him.

== Bibliography ==
- Aimond, Ch (1909). La cathédrale de Verdun; étude historique et archéologique. Nancy, Royer & cie.
- Baker, Derek (1 July 1989). "Ailred of Rievaulx and Walter Espec". In Patterson, Robert (ed.). Haskins Society Journal Studies in Medieval History: Volume 1. A&C Black. ISBN 978-0-8264-3027-4.
- Clapp, James A.; Dadoyan, Seta B. (8 September 2017). The Armenians in the Medieval Islamic World: Armenian Realpolitik in the Islamic World and Diverging Paradigmscase of Cilicia Eleventh to Fourteenth Centuries. Routledge. ISBN 978-1-351-48576-0.
- Freeburn, Dr Ryan P. (28 July 2013). Hugh of Amiens and the Twelfth-Century Renaissance. Ashgate Publishing, Ltd. ISBN 978-1-4094-8261-1.
- Grant, Lindy (1 January 2005). Architecture and Society in Normandy 1120-1270. Yale University Press. p. 28. ISBN 978-0-300-10686-2.
- Hamilton, Bernard; Jotischky, Andrew (22 October 2020). Latin and Greek Monasticism in the Crusader States. Cambridge University Press. ISBN 978-0-521-83638-8.
- Hill, Jonathan (25 March 2010). Dictionary of Theologians: To 1308. James Clarke & Company Limited. ISBN 978-0-227-17906-2.
- Jotischky, Andrew (21 July 2018). Pope Eugenius III (1145-1153): the First Cistercian Pope. Amsterdam University Press. ISBN 978-90-485-3720-4.
- Lapina, Elizabeth; Morton, Nicholas (22 May 2017). The Uses of the Bible in Crusader Sources. Brill. ISBN 978-90-04-34121-0.
- Palgrave, Francis (5 December 2013). The Collected Historical Works of Sir Francis Palgrave, K.H. Cambridge University Press. ISBN 978-1-107-62632-4.
- Phillips, Jonathan P. (2007). The Second Crusade: Extending the Frontiers of Christendom. Yale University Press. ISBN 9780300112740.
- Phillips, Jonathan P. (15 May 2017). "Armenia, Edessa and the Second Crusade". In Housley, Norman (ed.). Knighthoods of Christ: Essays on the History of the Crusades and the Knights Templar, Presented to Malcolm Barber. Routledge. ISBN 978-1-351-92392-7.
- Runciman, Steven (3 December 1987). A History of the Crusades. CUP Archive. p. 221. ISBN 978-0-521-34771-6.
- Ryan, James D. (1 May 2001). "Toleration Denied: Armenia between East and West in the Era of the Crusades". In Gervers, Michael; Powell, James M. (eds.). Tolerance and Intolerance: Social Conflict in the Age of the Crusades. Syracuse University Press. ISBN 978-0-8156-2869-9.
- Summerlin, Danica; Eichbauer, Melodie H. (5 November 2018). The Use of Canon Law in Ecclesiastical Administration, 1000–1234. Brill. ISBN 978-90-04-38724-9.

Catholic Church titles
Preceded by Drogone	Cardinal-bishop of Ostia; 1138–1148	Succeeded by Guido de Summa
