= 1154 papal election =

Election of Pope Adrian IV

Papal election 1154

Dates and location
- 4 December 1154; Old St. Peter's Basilica, Rome

Key officials
- Dean: Imar of Tusculum
- Protopriest: Guido Florentinus
- Protodeacon: Odone Bonecase

Elected pope
- Nicholas Breakspear; Name taken: Adrian IV
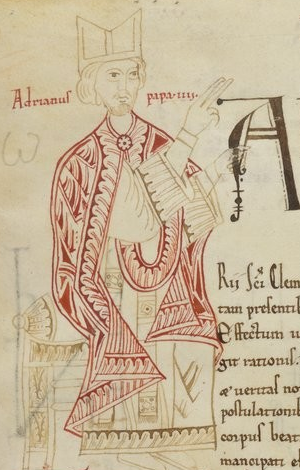

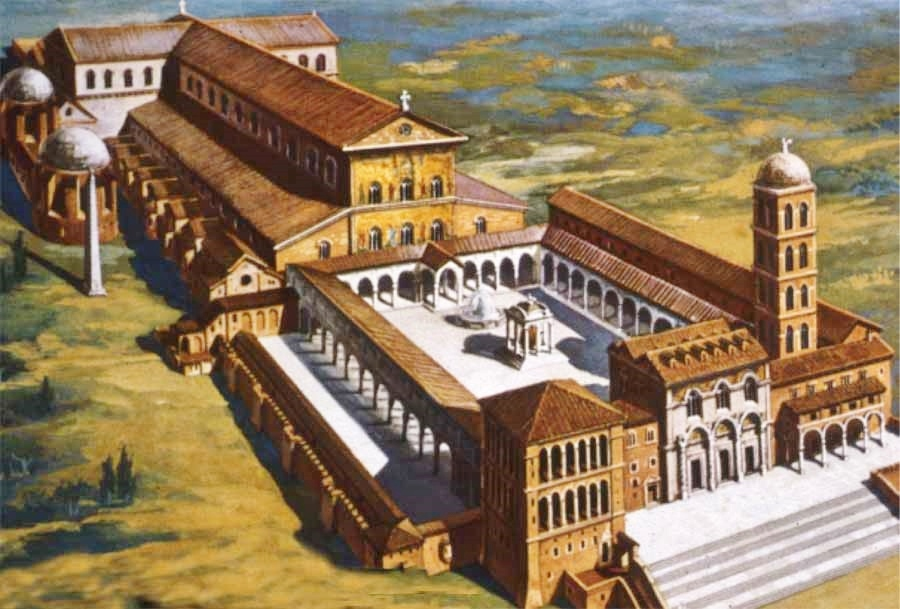
Old St. Peter's Basilica, site of the 1154 conclave

The 1154 papal election followed the death of Pope Anastasius IV and resulted in the election of Pope Adrian IV, the only Englishman to become pope.

== Election of Adrian IV ==
Pope Anastasius IV died on 3 December 1154 in Rome, at a very advanced age. The College of Cardinals assembled in Old St. Peter's Basilica on the next day to elect his successor. On 4 December 1154 the cardinals unanimously elected Cardinal-Bishop of Albano Nicholas Breakspeare, former legate in Scandinavia (1152–1153). He took the name Adrian IV and was crowned on 5 December 1154 in the Vatican Basilica. He is the only English pope in history.

== Cardinal-electors ==
There were probably 30 cardinals in the Sacred College of Cardinals at the beginning of December 1154, but it seems that no more than 25 (perhaps even fewer) participated in the election:

Elector	Cardinalatial Title	Elevated	Elevator	Notes
Imar, O.S.B.Cluny	Bishop of Tusculum	13 March 1142	Innocent II	Dean of the Sacred College of Cardinals
Guarino Foscari, Can.Reg.	Bishop of Palestrina	22 December 1144	Lucius II	Cardinal-nephew
Nicholas Breakspeare, Can.Reg.	Bishop of Albano	16 December 1149	Eugenius III	Elected Pope Adrian IV
Hugo, O.Cist.	Bishop of Ostia e Velletri	21 December 1151	Eugenius III	
Gregorio della Suburra	Bishop of Sabina	1 March 1140	Innocent II	
Cencio de Gregorio	Bishop of Porto e Santa Rufina	2 March 1151	Eugenius III	
Guido Florentinus	Priest of S. Crisogono	1139	Innocent II	Protopriest
Ubaldo Allucingoli	Priest of S. Prassede	16 December 1138	Innocent II	Future Pope Lucius III (1181-1185)
Ottaviano de Monticelli	Priest of S. Cecilia	25 February 1138	Innocent II	Future Antipope Victor IV (1159-1164)
Manfredo	Priest of S. Sabina	17 December 1143	Celestine II	
Ariberto	Priest of S. Anastasia	17 December 1143	Celestine II	
Astaldo degli Astalli	Priest of S. Prisca	17 December 1143	Celestine II	
Giulio	Priest of S. Marcello	19 May 1144	Lucius II	
Ubaldo Caccianemici, Can.Reg.	Priest of S. Croce in Gerusalemme	19 May 1144	Lucius II	Cardinal-nephew
Guido Puella	Priest of S. Pudenziana	22 December 1144	Lucius II	
Bernard, Can.Reg.	Priest of S. Clemente	22 December 1144	Lucius II	Archpriest of the Vatican Basilica
Rolando	Priest of S. Marco and Chancellor of the Holy Roman Church	22 September 1150	Eugenius III	Future Pope Alexander III (1159-1181)
Gerard	Priest of S. Stefano al Monte Celio	2 March 1151	Eugenius III	
Giovanni da Sutri	Priest of SS. Giovanni e Paolo	21 February 1152	Eugenius III	Rector of Campagna
Enrico da Pisa, O.Cist.	Priest of SS. Nereo ed Achilleo	21 February 1152	Eugenius III	
Giovanni Morrone	Priest of SS. Silvestro e Martino	23 May 1152	Eugenius III	
Rodolfo	Deacon of S. Lucia in Septisolio	17 December 1143	Celestine II	
Guido di Crema	Deacon of S. Maria in Portico	21 September 1145	Eugenius III	Future Antipope Paschal III (1164-1168)
Giovanni Gaderisio, Can.Reg.	Deacon of SS. Sergio e Bacco	22 September 1150	Eugenius III	
Ottone da Brescia	Deacon of S. Nicola in Carcere	21 February 1152	Eugenius III	

Five electors were created by Pope Innocent II, four by Pope Celestine II, five by Pope Lucius II, eleven by Pope Eugenius III.

== Absentees ==
At least five cardinals did not participate in this election. Cardinal Giacinto Bobone is known to have been in Spain at that time; he served there as papal legate from the spring of 1154 until the end of 1155. Cardinal Odone Bonecase was employed as legate in France in 1154/55. Gerard de Namur was legate in Germany, while Ildebrando in Lombardy. Abbot Rainaldo of Montecassino was not a resident of Roman Curia:

Elector	Cardinalatial Title	Elevated	Elevator	Notes
Rainaldo di Collemezzo, O.S.B.Cas.	Priest of SS. Marcellino e Pietro	ca.1139-1141	Innocent II	Abbot of Montecassino (external cardinal)
Odone Bonecase	Deacon of S. Giorgio in Velabro	4 March 1132	Innocent II	Protodeacon; papal legate in France
Giacinto Bobone	Deacon of S. Maria in Cosmedin	22 December 1144	Lucius II	Papal legate in Spain; future Pope Celestine III (1191–98)
Gerard de Namur	Deacon of S. Maria in Via Lata	21 February 1152	Eugenius III	Papal legate in Germany
Ildebrando Grassi, Can.Reg.	Deacon of S. Eustachio	24 May 1152	Eugenius III	Administrator of the see of Modena; Papal legate in Lombardy

== Sources ==
- Salvador Miranda Papal election of 1154
- Robinson, Ian Stuart (1990). The Papacy, 1073–1198: Continuity and Innovation. New York: Cambridge University Press. ISBN 0521264987.
- Jaffé, Philipp (1851). Regesta pontificum Romanorum ab condita Ecclesia ad annum post Christum natum MCXCVIII. Berlin: Veit et Socius.
- Brixius, Johannes M. (1912). Die Mitglieder des Kardinalkollegiums von 1130–1181. Berlin.
- Zenker, Barbara (1964). Die Mitglieder des Kardinalkollegiums von 1130 bis 1159. Würzburg.
