= 1153 papal election =

Election of Catholic Pope Anastasius IV

Papal election 1153

Dates and location
- 8 July 1153

Key officials
- Dean: Corrado Demetri della Suburra
- Protopriest: Guido Florentinus
- Protodeacon: Odone Bonecase

Elected pope
- Corrado Demetri della Suburra; Name taken: Anastasius IV

The 1153 papal election followed the death of Pope Eugene III and resulted in the election of Pope Anastasius IV.

== Election of Anastasius IV ==
Pope Eugenius III died on 8 July 1153 at Tivoli. On 12 July the cardinals elected as his successor cardinal Corrado Demetri della Suburra, bishop of Sabina and dean of the College of Cardinals, who was 80 years old. He took the name Anastasius IV and was crowned on the same day, probably in Rome.

== Cardinal-electors ==
There were 35 cardinals in the Sacred College of Cardinals in July 1153, but it seems that no more than 30 (perhaps even fewer) participated in the election:

Elector	Cardinalatial Title	Elevated	Elevator	Notes
Corrado Demetri della Suburra	Bishop of Sabina	1113/14	Paschalis II	Dean of the College of Cardinals; Elected Pope Anastasius IV
Imar, O.S.B.Cluny	Bishop of Tusculum	13 March 1142	Innocent II	
Guarino Foscari, Can.Reg.	Bishop of Palestrina	22 December 1144	Lucius II	Cardinal-nephew
Hugo, O.Cist.	Bishop of Ostia e Velletri	21 December 1151	Eugenius III	
Guido Florentinus	Priest of S. Crisogono	1139	Innocent II	Protopriest
Gregorio della Suburra	Priest of S. Maria in Trastevere	1 March 1140	Innocent II	
Ubaldo Allucingoli	Priest of S. Prassede	16 December 1138	Innocent II	Future Pope Lucius III (1181-1185)
Ottaviano de Monticelli	Priest of S. Cecilia	25 February 1138	Innocent II	Future Antipope Victor IV (1159-1164)
Manfredo	Priest of S. Sabina	17 December 1143	Celestine II	
Ariberto	Priest of S. Anastasia	17 December 1143	Celestine II	
Giovanni Paparoni	Priest of S. Lorenzo in Damaso	17 December 1143	Celestine II	
Astaldo degli Astalli	Priest of S. Prisca	17 December 1143	Celestine II	
Giulio	Priest of S. Marcello	19 May 1144	Lucius II	
Ubaldo Caccianemici, Can.Reg.	Priest of S. Croce in Gerusalemme	19 May 1144	Lucius II	Cardinal-nephew
Guido Puella	Priest of S. Pudenziana	22 December 1144	Lucius II	
Jordan, O.Carth.	Priest of S. Susanna	22 December 1144	Lucius II	
Rolando	Priest of S. Marco and Chancellor of the Holy Roman Church	22 September 1150	Eugenius III	Future Pope Alexander III (1159-1181)
Gerard	Priest of S. Stefano al Monte Celio	2 March 1151	Eugenius III	
Cencio de Gregorio	Priest of S. Lorenzo in Lucina	2 March 1151	Eugenius III	
Giovanni da Sutri	Priest of SS. Giovanni e Paolo	21 February 1152	Eugenius III	
Errico Moricotti, O.Cist.	Priest of SS. Nereo ed Achilleo	21 February 1152	Eugenius III	
Giovanni Mercone	Priest of SS. Silvestro e Martino	23 May 1152	Eugenius III	
Odone Bonecase	Deacon of S. Giorgio in Velabro	4 March 1132	Innocent II	Protodeacon
Rodolfo	Deacon of S. Lucia in Septisolio	17 December 1143	Celestine II	
Giacinto Bobone	Deacon of S. Maria in Cosmedin	22 December 1144	Lucius II	Future Pope Celestine III (1191–98)
Guido di Crema	Deacon of S. Maria in Portico	21 September 1145	Eugenius III	Future Antipope Paschal III (1164-1168)
Giovanni da Napoli, Can.Reg.	Deacon of SS. Sergio e Bacco	22 September 1150	Eugenius III	
Gerard de Namur	Deacon of S. Maria in Via Lata	21 February 1152	Eugenius III	
Ottone da Brescia	Deacon of S. Nicola in Carcere	21 February 1152	Eugenius III	
Bernard de Rennes, O.Cist.	Deacon of SS. Cosma e Damiano	23 May 1152	Eugenius III	

Six electors were created by Pope Innocent II, five by Pope Celestine II, six by Pope Lucius II, twelve by Pope Eugenius III and one by Pope Paschalis II.

== Absentees ==
Elector	Cardinalatial Title	Elevated	Elevator	Notes
Nicholas Breakspeare, Can.Reg.	Bishop of Albano	16 December 1149	Eugenius III	Papal legate in Scandinavia; future Pope Adrian IV (1153-1154)
Rainaldo di Collemezzo, O.S.B.Cas.	Priest of SS. Marcellino e Pietro	ca. 1139-1141	Innocent II	Abbot of Montecassino (external cardinal)
Bernard, Can.Reg.	Priest of S. Clemente	22 December 1144	Lucius II	Papal legate in Germany; archpriest of the Vatican Basilica
Gregorio	Deacon of S. Angelo	17 December 1143	Celestine II	Papal legate in Germany
Ildebrando Grassi, Can.Reg.	Deacon of S. Eustachio	23 May 1152	Eugenius III	Papal legate in Lombardy

== Sources ==
- Ian Stuart Robinson, The Papacy 1073-1198. Continuity and Innovation, Cambridge University Press 1990
- Philipp Jaffé, Regesta pontificum Romanorum ab condita Ecclesia ad annum post Christum natum MCXCVIII, vol. II, Leipzig 1888
- Johannes M. Brixius, Die Mitglieder des Kardinalkollegiums von 1130-1181, Berlin 1912
- Barbara Zenker, Die Mitglieder des Kardinalkollegiums von 1130 bis 1159, Würzburg 1964
- Klaus Ganzer, Die Entwicklung des auswärtigen Kardinalats im hohen Mittelalter, Tübingen 1963
- Miranda, Salvador. "Election of July 8, 1153 (Anastasius IV)". The Cardinals of the Holy Roman Church. Florida International University. OCLC 53276621.
