= Caccianemici =

Caccianemici (pronounced [kattʃaneˈmiːtʃi]) is an Italian surname from Bologna, literally translating to 'enemy-chaser'. Notable people with the surname include:

- Francesco Caccianemici, Italian Renaissance painter
- Gerardo Caccianemici, multiple people
- Ghisolabella dei Caccianemici, Italian 13th-century noblewoman
- Ubaldo Caccianemici (died 1171), Italian cardinal and cardinal-nephew of Pope Lucius II
- Vicenzo Caccianemici (fl. 1530), Italian Renaissance painter
