= Cardinals created by Eugene III =

Catholic appointments from 1145 to 1152

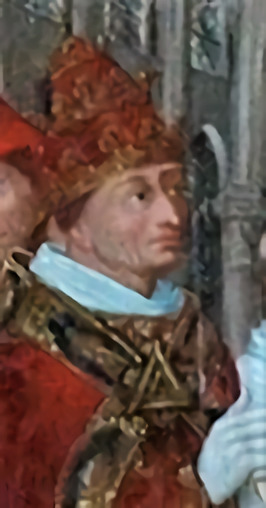
Pope Eugene III

Pope Eugene III (1145–1153) created sixteen cardinals in nine consistories:

== Consistories ==
=== 9 March 1145 ===
- Pietro — cardinal-deacon of S. Maria in Via Lata, † after 1148

=== 21 September 1145 ===
- Guido de Crema — cardinal-deacon of S. Maria in Portico, cardinal-priest of S. Maria in Trastevere (14 March 1158), Antipope Paschalis III (22 April 1164), † 20 September 1168

=== 25 February 1149 ===
- Grecus — cardinal-deacon of SS. Sergio e Bacco, † 30 August 1149

=== 16 December 1149 ===
- Nicholas Breakspeare, C.R.St.-Ruf — cardinal-bishop of Albano, Pope Hadrian IV (4 December 1154), † 1 September 1159

=== 22 September 1150 ===
- Rolando of Siena — cardinal-deacon of SS. Cosma e Damiano, cardinal-priest of S. Marco (2 March 1151), Pope Alexander III (7 September 1159), † 30 August 1181
- Giovanni Gaderisio, Can.Reg. — cardinal-deacon of SS. Sergio e Bacco, cardinal-priest of S. Anastasia (14 March 1158), † April 1182

=== 2 March 1151 ===
- Gerard — cardinal-priest of S. Stefano in Celiomonte, † 1158
- Cencio de Gregorio — cardinal-deacon of S. Maria in Aquiro, then cardinal-priest of S. Lorenzo in Lucina (21 February 1152) and cardinal-bishop of Porto e S. Rufina (April 1154), † 1157

=== 21 December 1151 ===
- Hugo, O.Cist. — cardinal-bishop of Ostia, † 1 December 1158

=== 21 February 1152 ===
- Giovanni da Sutri — cardinal-priest of SS. Giovanni e Paolo, † 1180
- Enrico Pisano, O.Cist. — cardinal-priest of SS. Nereo ed Achilleo, † 1166
- Gerard de Namur — cardinal-deacon of the Holy Roman Church, then cardinal-deacon of S. Maria in Via Lata (19 December 1152), † 1155
- Ottone da Brescia — cardinal-deacon of the Holy Roman Church, then cardinal-deacon of S. Nicola in Carcere (19 December 1152), † 1174

=== 23 May 1152 ===
- Giovanni Morrone — cardinal-priest of SS. Silvestro e Martino, † ca. 1167/68
- Bernard de Rennes, O.Cist. — cardinal-deacon of the Holy Roman Church, then cardinal-deacon of SS. Cosma e Damiano (19 December 1152), † 1 May 1154
- Ildebrando Grassi, Can.Reg. — cardinal-deacon of the Holy Roman Church, then cardinal-deacon of S. Eustachio (19 December 1152), cardinal-priest of SS. XII Apostoli (21 December 1156), † 8 November 1178.

== "Presumed cardinals" ==
The following other persons are also listed as cardinals created by Eugene III, but they should be excluded from that list because they were never promoted to the cardinalate or are confused with another cardinals ("presumed cardinals"):

Name	Alleged cardinalate	Notes
Guy	Cardinal-deacon of S. Maria in Portico 1145–ca.1159	He is the same as Guido di Crema, future Antipope Paschalis III
Rainiero Marescotti	Cardinal-deacon of SS. Sergio e Bacco in 1145	This cardinal appears only in the falsehoods of the 16th century
Bercarco	Cardinal-deacon in 1145	He subscribed a bull on 14 March 1145 but this is certainly the same person as cardinal-deacon Berardo created by Lucius II, whose name has been corrupted on some copies of this bull
Guido	Cardinal-deacon in 1145	Guido S.R.E. diaconus card. subscribed papal bulls between 14 March and 12 May 1145, but he is the same as Guido de Castro Ficeclo, created by Innocent II, not a separate individual
Bernard, O.S.B.Cas.	Cardinal-priest in 1146	He did not subscribe any papal bulls
Gregorio	Cardinal-deacon 1146–1153	He did not subscribe any papal bulls
Guido	Cardinal-bishop of Ostia 1148/49–1150	He is the same as Guido de Summa, who was created cardinal-priest of S. Lorenzo in Damaso by Celestine II in 1143; Eugene III promoted him to cardinal-bishop of Ostia in 1149
Giovanni	Cardinal-priest of S. Marco 1149–1151	He did not subscribe any papal bulls. The title of S. Marco was occupied by Gilberto from 1143 until 1150 and then by Rolando from March 1151.
Galfroy, bishop of St.Asaph 1152–1154	Cardinal-deacon 1149–ca.1175	He did not subscribe any papal bulls and the great majority of the sources doubt or ignore his alleged promotion to the cardinalate
Gualterio	Cardinal-deacon of S. Maria in Portico 1149–1155	The existence of this cardinal is not possible at that time because the deaconry of S. Maria in Portico was occupied by Guido di Crema from 1145 until 1158
Sylvester, O.S.B., abbot of Subiaco	Cardinal-priest or deacon in 1150	Neither the cardinal nor the abbot of Subiaco with this name is attested at that time. Apparently he is confused with Simone Borelli, abbot of Subiaco 1149/52–1183/84, created cardinal-deacon of S. Maria in Domnica by Hadrian IV
Jean, O.S.B.Clun.	Cardinal-deacon in 1150	He did not subscribe any papal bulls
Ardizzone, bishop of Cuma	Cardinal-priest in 1150	Bishop Ardicius of Cuma is well attested at that time but there is no evidence that he was promoted to the cardinalate.
Matteo, archpriest of the Liberian Basilica	Cardinal in 1150–1153	Matteo, archpriest of the Liberian Basilica, is attested in January 1153 but he was not a cardinal
Alberto	Cardinal-deacon of S. Eustachio in 1151 and then cardinal-priest of SS. Apostoli in 1153	He did not subscribe any papal bulls.
Gregorio	Cardinal-deacon of SS. Vito e Modesto 1152–1159, joined the obedience of Antipope Victor IV in 1159	He did not subscribe any papal bulls and is not attested among the adherents of Victor IV in 1159. The cardinal with this name and title lived under Callixtus II

Besides, it is often claimed that cardinals Jordan of S. Susanna, Bernardo of S. Clemente and Cinzio of SS. Sergio e Bacco were created by Eugene III, but they were all promoted by Lucius II as "cardinal-deacons of the Holy Roman Church"; Eugene III only gave them the titular churches.

== Bibliography ==
- Barbara Zenker: Die Mitglieder des Kardinalkollegiums von 1130 bis 1159. Würzburg 1964, S. 224-225
- Johannes M. Brixius: Die Mitglieder des Kardinalkollegiums von 1130-1181. Berlin 1912, S. 53-57
- Michael Horn: Studien zur Geschichte Papst Eugens III.(1145-1153), Peter Lang Verlag 1992
- Philipp Jaffé, Regesta pontificum Romanorum ab condita Ecclesia ad annum post Christum natum MCXCVIII, vol. II, Berlin 1888
- J. P. Migne: Eugenius III: Epistolae et Privilegia
