= 1159 papal election =

Election of Catholic Pope Alexander III

Papal election 1159

Dates and location
- 4–7 September 1159; Vatican Basilica, Rome

Key officials
- Dean: Imar of Tusculum
- Sub-dean: Gregorio della Suburra
- Camerlengo: Boso Breakspeare
- Protopriest: Ubaldo Caccianemici
- Protodeacon: Odone Bonecase

Election
- Candidates: Bernard of Porto, Ottaviano de Monticelli, Rolando of Siena

Elected pope
- Rolando of Siena; Name taken: Alexander III
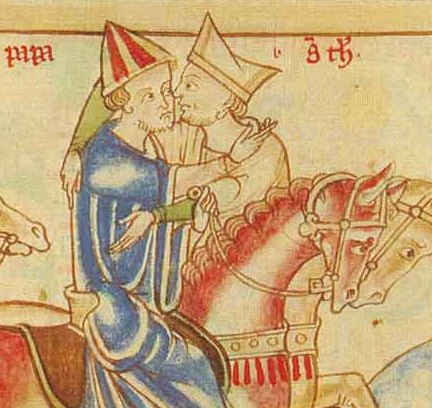

The papal election held from 4 to 7 September 1159 following the death of Pope Adrian IV resulted in the election of two rival popes. A majority of the cardinals elected Cardinal Rolando of Siena as Pope Alexander III, but a minority refused to recognize him and elected their own candidate, Ottaviano de Monticelli, who took the name Victor IV, creating a schism that lasted until 1178.

The schism was a result of the growing tensions inside the Sacred College of Cardinals concerning the foreign policy of the Holy See. The Papal States in the 12th century were a buffer between the Holy Roman Empire and the Norman Kingdom of Sicily. After the Concordat of Worms in 1122, the Papacy allied with the Empire rather than with the Normans, but during the pontificate of Adrian IV (1154–59) this alliance broke up because Emperor Frederick I Barbarossa did not fulfil the terms of the treaty of Constance (1153) that obliged him to help the Papacy to restore its authority in Rome and in other territories controlled by the king of Sicily. In these circumstances Adrian IV decided to break the alliance with the Emperor and to make peace with William I of Sicily by signing the Treaty of Benevento (1156). In the following years there were growing tensions between the papacy and Emperor Frederick I Barbarossa (e.g. a dispute at the diet of Besançon in 1157). Frederick tried – with significant success – to strengthen his influence on the Church in Germany. The change of direction of the papal foreign policy resulted in the division of the Sacred College into supporters and opponents of the new policy, who were unable to achieve a compromise after the death of Adrian IV.

The election of 1159 had also significant legal consequences. Up to that time, the election of the new pope required unanimity among the electors, which led to the schism when the existence of factions in the Sacred College made the unanimity impossible. To avoid such schism in the future, the Third Lateran Council in 1179 promulgated the decree Licet de evitanda discordia, which established the rule that the Pope is elected with a majority of two thirds of the cardinals participating in the election.

== Death of Adrian IV ==
Pope Adrian IV died on 1 September 1159. Fearing a possible schism, shortly before his death he recommended to the cardinals the election of Cardinal Bernard of Porto as his successor.

== List of participants ==
There were thirty-one cardinals in September 1159. One of them seems not to have participated in the election, leaving thirty electors:

| Elector | Faction | Cardinalatial title | Elevated | Elevator | Notes |
|---|---|---|---|---|---|
| Imar, O.S.B. Cluny | Imperial | Bishop of Tusculum | 13 March 1142 | Innocent II | Dean of the Sacred College of Cardinals |
| Gregorio della Suburra | Sicilian | Bishop of Sabina | 1 March 1140 | Innocent II | Sub-dean of the Sacred College of Cardinals |
| Ubaldo Allucingoli | Sicilian | Bishop of Ostia e Velletri | 16 December 1138 | Innocent II | Future Pope Lucius III (1181–85) |
| Giulio | neutral | Bishop of Palestrina | 19 May 1144 | Lucius II | |
| Bernard, Can.Reg. | Sicilian | Bishop of Porto e Santa Rufina | 22 December 1144 | Lucius II | Archpriest of the Vatican Basilica; designated by Adrian IV but not elected |
| Walter, Can.Reg. | Sicilian | Bishop of Albano | 19 December 1158 | Adrian IV | |
| Ubaldo Caccianemici, Can.Reg. | Sicilian | Priest of S. Croce in Gerusalemme | 19 May 1144 | Lucius II | Protopriest of the Sacred College of Cardinals; Cardinal-nephew (?) |
| Ottaviano de Monticelli | Imperial | Priest of S. Cecilia | 25 February 1138 | Innocent II | Elected Antipope Victor IV |
| Astaldo degli Astalli | neutral | Priest of S. Prisca | 17 December 1143 | Celestine II | |
| Guido di Crema | Imperial | Priest of S. Maria in Trastevere | 21 September 1145 | Eugenius III | Future Antipope Paschal III (1164–68) |
| Rolando | Sicilian | Priest of S. Marco and Chancellor of the Holy Roman Church | 22 September 1150 | Eugenius III | Elected Pope Alexander III |
| Giovanni Gaderisio, Can.Reg. | Sicilian | Priest of S. Anastasia | 22 September 1150 | Eugenius III | |
| Giovanni da Sutri | neutral | Priest of SS. Giovanni e Paolo | 21 February 1152 | Eugenius III | |
| Enrico Moricotti, O.Cist. | neutral | Priest of SS. Nereo ed Achilleo | 21 February 1152 | Eugenius III | |
| Giovanni Morrone | Imperial | Priest of SS. Silvestro e Martino | 23 May 1152 | Eugenius III | |
| Ildebrando Grassi, Can.Reg. | Sicilian | Priest of SS. XII Apostoli | 23 May 1152 | Eugenius III | |
| Bonadies de Bonadie | neutral | Priest of S. Crisogono | 21 December 1156 | Adrian IV | |
| Alberto di Morra, Can.Reg.Praem. | neutral | Priest of S. Lorenzo in Lucina | 21 December 1156 | Adrian IV | Future Pope Gregory VIII (1187) |
| Guglielmo Marengo, O.Cist. | Imperial (?) | Priest of S. Pietro in Vincoli | 14 March 1158 | Adrian IV | |
| Odone Bonecase | Sicilian | Deacon of S. Giorgio in Velabro | 4 March 1132 | Innocent II | Protodeacon of the Sacred College of Cardinals |
| Rodolfo | neutral | Deacon of S. Lucia in Septisolio | 17 December 1143 | Celestine II | |
| Giacinto Bobone | neutral | Deacon of S. Maria in Cosmedin | 22 December 1144 | Lucius II | Future Pope Celestine III (1191–98) |
| Ottone da Brescia | Sicilian | Deacon of S. Nicola in Carcere | 21 February 1152 | Eugenius III | |
| Ardicio Rivoltella | Sicilian | Deacon of S. Teodoro | 21 December 1156 | Adrian IV | |
| Boso, Can.Reg. | Sicilian | Deacon of SS. Cosma e Damiano | 21 December 1156 | Adrian IV | Camerlengo of the Holy Roman Church; prefect of the Castle Sant’Angelo |
| Simeone Borelli, O.S.B.Cas. | Imperial | Deacon of S. Maria in Domnica | ca.1157 | Adrian IV | Abbot of Subiaco |
| Cinthius Capellus | Imperial (?) | Deacon of S. Adriano | 14 March 1158 | Adrian IV | nephew of Innocent II |
| Pietro di Miso | Sicilian | Deacon of S. Eustachio | 14 March 1158 | Adrian IV | |
| Raymond de Nimes | Imperial | Deacon of S. Maria in Via Lata | 14 March 1158 | Adrian IV | |
| Giovanni Conti da Anagni | neutral | Deacon of S. Maria in Portico | 19 December 1158 | Adrian IV | |

Five electors were created by Pope Innocent II, two by Pope Celestine II, four by Pope Lucius II, eight by Pope Eugenius III and eleven by Pope Adrian IV.

== Absentee ==
| Elector | Faction | Cardinalatial title | Elevated | Elevator | Notes |
|---|---|---|---|---|---|
| Rainaldo di Collemezzo, O.S.B.Cas. | neutral | Priest of SS. Marcellino e Pietro | ca.1139–1141 | Innocent II | Abbot of Montecassino (external cardinal) |

== Divisions in the Sacred College ==
The College of Cardinals was divided into two factions: the so-called "Sicilian" party and the Imperial faction. The "Sicilian" party, led by chancellor Rolando of Siena and Camerlengo Boso, supported the pro-Sicilian policy of Adrian IV. The Imperial faction was led by Ottaviano of S. Cecilia.

It is known that the "Sicilian" party counted thirteen cardinals. They were chancellor Roland of S. Marco, camerlengo Boso of SS. Cosma e Damiano, cardinal-bishops Bernard of Porto, Ubaldo of Ostia, Walter of Albano and Gregorio of Sabina, as well as cardinals Odone of S. Giorgio, Ubaldo of S. Croce, Ottone of S. Nicola, Ardicio of S. Teodoro, Giovanni of S. Anastasia, Ildebrando of SS. Apostoli and Pietro of S. Eustachio.

The Imperial party may have counted as many as nine cardinals, but only six can be identified as its members: Ottaviano of S. Cecilia, Giovanni of SS. Silvestro e Martino, Guido of S. Maria in Trastevere, Imar of Tusculum, Raymond of S. Maria in Via Lata and Simeone of S. Maria in Domnica Guglielmo of S. Pietro in Vincoli was probably the seventh one. Perhaps Cardinal Cinzio of S. Adriano also belonged to this faction. The remaining ten cardinals were neutral.

It is believed that both factions made some preparations to the election in the last months of the pontificate of Adrian IV, although these attempts are known only from the hostile accounts produced for the polemical purposes during the subsequent schism and it is impossible to verify their accuracy. Both sides accused each other of illegal conspiracies. The adherents of Victor IV accused "Sicilians" of receiving the bribes from the king William I of Sicily and the anti-Imperial cities of Brescia, Milan and Piacenza. They ostensibly made an oath not to vote for any candidate outside their circle. On the other hand, "Sicilians" accused imperialists of hatching a plot with the imperial envoy Otto von Wittelsbach, who was present at Rome at the time of the election and gave the significant support to Victor IV in taking control over the Patrimony of St. Peter. It is known that the secular adherents of Cardinal Ottaviano de Monticelli, who was related to the powerful family of the counts of Tusculum, were prepared for the armed confrontation in Rome. Evidently, neither party was prepared for compromise.

== Proceedings ==
=== Election of Alexander III ===
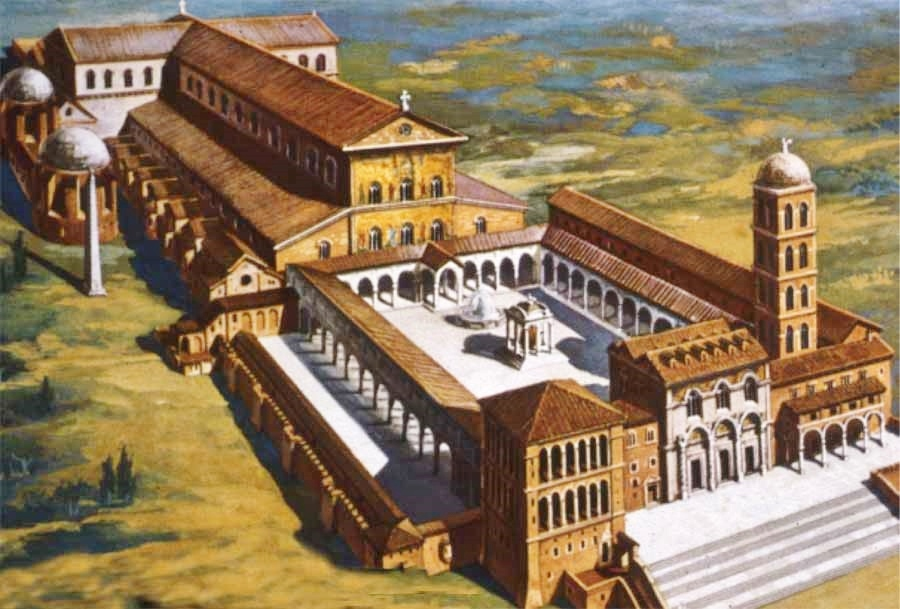
Old St. Peter's Basilica, site of the 1159 conclave

The cardinals assembled in the Vatican Basilica on 4 September, three days after the death of Adrian IV. They had decided that, according to the custom, the election should be unanimous to be valid. It seems that the candidature of Bernard of Porto, recommended by Adrian as acceptable for both factions, had never been even advanced. Both parties put forward candidates mutually unacceptable: the imperial party proposed Ottaviano de Monticelli, while "Sicilians" proposed chancellor Rolando. The cardinals discussed for three days without achieving a compromise. However, the "Sicilian" party was able to join all the neutral cardinals and probably detached also some members of the imperial faction. On the fourth day (7 September), Cardinal Rolando of Siena was proclaimed pope by them and took the name Alexander III, although the unanimity had not been achieved and some cardinals still opposed his candidature. According to the manifest of Alexandrine party of October 1159 and an account of Cardinal Boso, on that day Rolando received the votes of all cardinals assembled except three: those of Ottaviano of S. Cecilia, Giovanni of SS. Silvestro e Martino and Guido of S. Maria in Trastevere. Then supporters of Rolando recognized that “It seemed inappropriate that ... the apostolic see ... should remain any longer without a ruler because of the contentiousness of the aforesaid [three] men”. On the other hand, the opposite party claimed that Ottaviano had still nine votes, and that the "Sicilian" party, having majority, simply broke the rule that required unanimity for the valid election. However, the version of the imperial cardinals is believed to be less reliable than the version of the Alexandrine party, even if the latter may be also not fully accurate; based on the subscriptions of the manifests of both parties issued shortly after the election, it is possible to assume that at least twenty-three electors voted for Rolando, and no more than six opposed him.

=== Election of Victor IV ===
The electors of Cardinal Rolando, immediately after proclaiming him Pope, attempted to place upon him the purple mantle which symbolized the assumption of the papal office, but then the election entered the tumultuous stage. Cardinal Ottaviano Monticelli snatched the mantle from Alexander's back and his armed bands burst into the basilica. Alexander III and his supporters fled to the citadel of St. Peter, which was in the hands of Cardinal Boso. In their absence, the few cardinals who remained in basilica elected Ottaviano of S. Cecilia to the papacy and enthroned him as Victor IV. The exact number of his electors is not known, but there are good reasons to believe that it was six, including Ottaviano himself, since only five cardinals signed the manifest in his favour in the following month. However, it is possible that some additional cardinals participated in the election of Victor IV but very quickly joined the obedience of Alexander III.

=== Consecration of Alexander III ===
Pope Alexander III remained in the citadel for a week until he was rescued and escorted from Rome by Odo Frangipane, and on September 18 he was eventually bestowed with the purple mantle. On 20 September at the small village of Ninfa, south-east of Velletri, he was consecrated bishop of Rome by Cardinal Ubaldo Allucingoli, bishop of Ostia e Velletri, and crowned by Cardinal Odone Bonecase, protodeacon of S. Giorgio in Velabro. On 27 September he excommunicated Victor IV and his adherents.

=== Consecration of Victor IV ===
Victor IV was consecrated on 4 October in the abbey of Farfa by Cardinal-Bishop Imar of Tusculum, dean of the Sacred College of Cardinals, assisted by the bishops Ubaldo of Ferentino and Riccardo of Melfi. With the armed assistance of Otto von Wittelsbach and his own armed groups in relatively short time he took control over the City of Rome and the Patrimony of St. Peter, while Alexander III took refuge in the territory of the Kingdom of Sicily, and later in France.

=== Manifests of both factions in October 1159 ===
Both rivals together with their adherents defended the legality of their elections. In October 1159 cardinals of both obediences produced the manifests to the Emperor Frederick in favour of their elects. The “Alexandrine” manifest was subscribed by twenty three cardinals, while that of Victorine faction only by five. Supporters of Victor IV, admitting that they were in minority, justified their action by the fact that the opposite faction broke the rule of unanimity and – in consequence – the election of Rolando was invalid. The opposite party claimed that the principle of unanimity had been breached by the obstructive conduct of merely three cardinals of the Imperial faction, who stubbornly refused to recognize the candidate desired by the rest of the Sacred College.

=== Final division of the Sacred College of Cardinals in October 1159 ===
| Obedience of Alexander III | Obedience of Victor IV |
|---|---|
| 1. Gregorio della Suburra, bishop of Sabina; 2. Ubaldo Allucingoli, bishop of Ostia e Velletri; 3. Giulio, bishop of Palestrina; 4. Bernard, Can.Reg., bishop of Porto e S. Rufina and archpriest of the Vatican Basilica; 5. Walter, Can.Reg., bishop of Albano; 6. Ubaldo Caccianemici, Can.Reg., protopriest of S. Croce in Gerusalemme; 7. Rainaldo di Collemezzo, O.S.B.Cas., priest of SS. Marcellino e Pietro and abbot of Montecassino; 8. Astaldo degli Astalli, priest of S. Prisca; 9. Giovanni da Sutri, priest of SS. Giovanni e Paolo; 10. Errico Moricotti, O.Cist., priest of SS. Nereo ed Achilleo; 11. Ildebrando Grassi, Can.Reg., priest of SS. XII Apostoli; 12. Giovanni Gaderisio, Can.Reg., priest of S. Anastasia; 13. Bonadies de Bonadie, priest of S. Crisogono; 14. Alberto di Morra, Can.Reg., priest of S. Lorenzo in Lucina; 15. Guglielmo Marengo, priest of S. Pietro in Vincoli; 16. Odone Bonecase, protodeacon of S. Giorgio in Velabro; 17. Rodolfo, deacon of S. Lucia in Septisolio; 18. Giacinto Bobone, deacon of S. Maria in Cosmedin; 19. Ottone da Brescia, deacon of S. Nicola in Carcere; 20. Ardicio Rivoltella, deacon of S. Teodoro; 21. Boso, Can.Reg., deacon of SS. Cosma e Damiano; 22. Cinzio Capellus, deacon of S. Adriano; 23. Pietro di Miso, deacon of S. Eustachio; 24. Giovanni Conti da Anagni, deacon of S. Maria in Portico | 1. Imar, O.S.B.Cluny, bishop of Tusculum; 2. Guido di Crema, priest of S. Maria in Trastevere; 3. Giovanni Morrone, priest of SS. Silvestro e Martino; 4. Raymond de Nimes, deacon of S. Maria in Via Lata; 5. Simeone Borelli, O.S.B.Cas., deacon of S. Maria in Domnica and abbot of Subiaco |

Simeone Borelli joined the obedience of Alexander III already at the end of 1159. Raymond of S. Maria in Vi Lata did the same between February and April 1160. Besides, at the end of 1159 Victor IV created at least three new cardinal-deacons: Bernard of SS. Sergio e Bacco, Giovanni of S Maria in Aquiro and Lando of S. Angelo, while Alexander III appointed on February 18, 1160, cardinal-deacon Milo of S. Maria in Aquiro.

== Schism ==
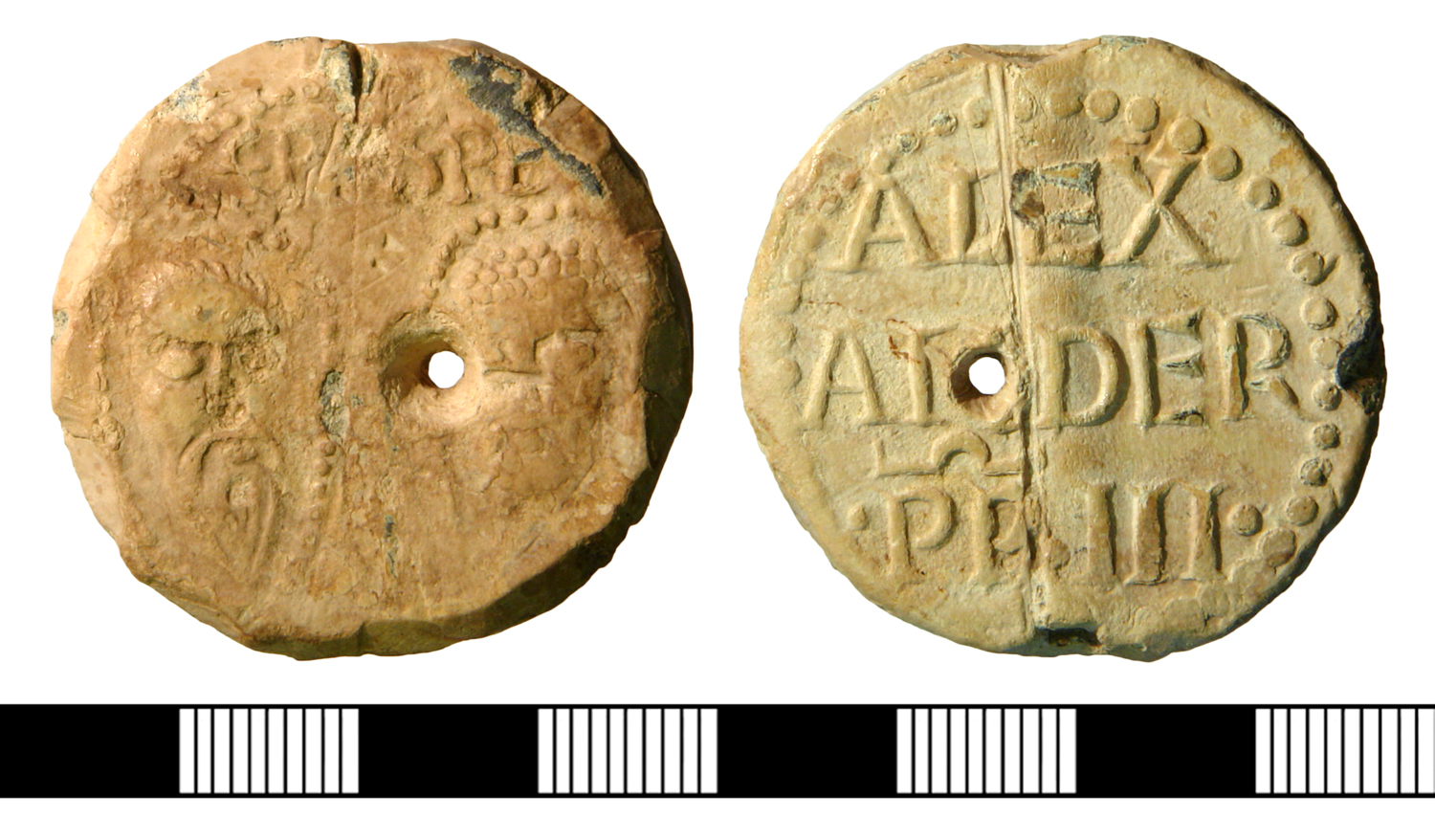
Bulla of Alexander III

Both popes sent their legates to the Catholic kingdoms in order to secure their recognition. At the council of Pavia in February 1160 Emperor Frederick I declared himself in favour of Victor IV, and the episcopate of the Empire followed him, with the significant exception of archbishop of Salzburg Eberhard I von Hilpolstein-Biburg and his suffragans. King Valdemar I of Denmark also gave his support to Victor IV, but the primate of Denmark archbishop Eskil of Lund became partisan of Alexander III. It seems that Poland also supported Victor IV. The rest of Europe, namely France, England, Spain, Sweden, Norway, Scotland, Hungary, Sicily and the Latin territories in Outremer, recognized Alexander III as true Pope, even if in some of these countries there were a significant Victorine minorities in episcopates or among feudal rulers. The papal schism in Europe was now a fact.

The unity of the Church had been restored only after eighteen years, when Emperor Frederick I Barbarossa and Pope Alexander III signed a Treaty of Venice (1 August 1177); shortly thereafter the pro-imperial pope Callistus III (successor of Victor IV) abandoned his claims to the papacy and submitted to Alexander III (29 August 1178). Victor IV and his successors Paschal III (1164–68) and Callistus III (1168–78) are now regarded as antipopes by the Catholic Church, while Alexander III is recognized as legitimate successor of St. Peter the Apostle.

== Aftermath ==
The election of 1159 and the subsequent schism showed the necessity of amending the rules concerning papal elections. The decree Licet de evitanda discordia issued by the Third Lateran Council in 1179 abolished the rule of unanimity in favour of the rule of the majority of two thirds. The decree confirmed also that all three orders of the College of Cardinals (bishops, priests and deacons) are equal in the papal elections. Although the practice allowing the participation of cardinal-priests and cardinal-deacons on equal rights with cardinal-bishops had been introduced no later than in the papal election, 1118, the decree In Nomine Domini (1059) conferring the special electoral rights on the cardinal-bishops had never been formally revoked up to that time.

== Sources ==
- Brenda Bolton, Anne Duggan (2003). Adrian IV, the English Pope, 1154–1159: Studies and Texts. Ashgate Publishing, Ltd. ISBN 0-7546-0708-9.
- Langen, Joseph (1893). Geschichte der Römischen Kirche von Gregor VII. bis Innocenz III (in German). Bonn: M. Cohen. OL 7079971M.
- Jaffé, Philipp (1851). "Regesta pontificum Romanorum ab condita Ecclesia ad annum post Christum natum MCXCVIII". Pan Biblioteka Kórnicka (in Latin). Berlin.
- Kartusch, Elfriede (1948). Das Kardinalskollegium in der Zeit von 1181–1227 (in German). Wien.
- Brixius, Johannes Matthias (1912). Die Mitglieder des Kardinalkollegiums von 1130–1181 (in German). Berlin: R. Trenkel.
- Zenker, Barbara (1964). Die Mitglieder des Kardinalkollegiums von 1130 bis 1159 (in German). Würzburg.
- Salvador, Miranda (1998–2008). The Cardinals of the Holy Roman Church. Florida International University Library. Archived from the original on 2017-06-01.
- Rahewin (2001). Gesta Friderici. Domus Ecclesiae.
- Ian Stuart Robinson (1990). The Papacy 1073–1198. Continuity and Innovation. Cambridge Medieval Textbooks. Cambridge University Press. ISBN 0-521-31922-6.
