= Council of Tours (1163) =

The Council of Tours was convened by Pope Alexander III in 1163. It opened on 19 May with a speech by Bishop Arnulf of Lisieux concerning the unity of the church. With well over 500 attendants, the council reaffirmed the excommunication of Antipope Victor IV, declared the Cathars heretics, and condemned clerical usury. Canonizations were postponed with Anselm of Canterbury's status being remitted to a provincial council.

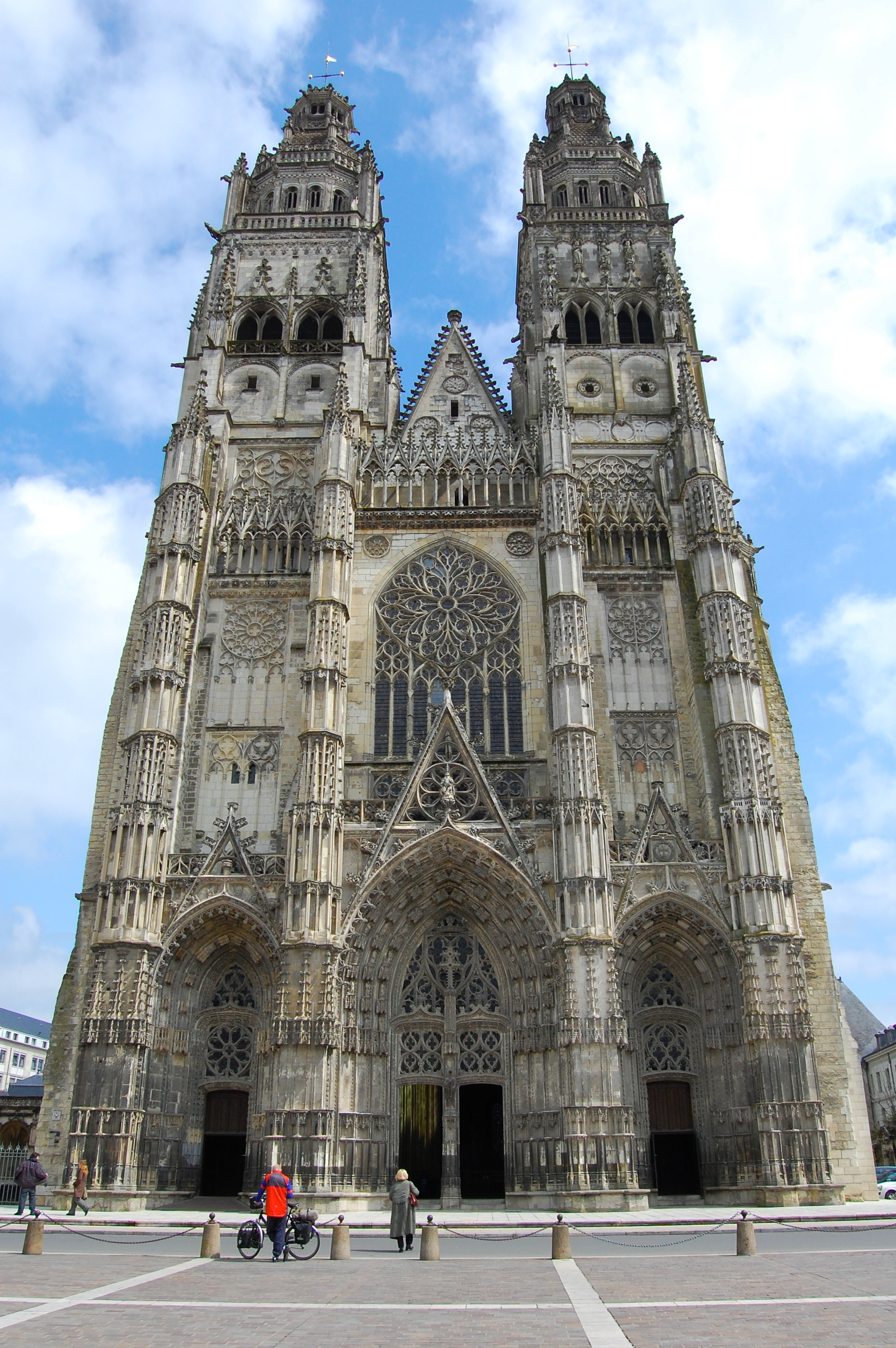
Cathedral of Tours, site of the council

== Background ==
In September 1159, Rolando Bandinelli was elected pope by the Sicilian and neutral factions of cardinals, and took the name Alexander III. The Sicilian faction's attempt to place the purple mantle upon Alexander was interrupted by the Imperialist faction and an armed group entering the basilica. Alexander and his supporters fled to the citadel of St. Peter. Left in control of the basilica, the Imperialist faction of cardinals proclaimed Octaviano Monticelli, who took the name Victor IV, as pope.

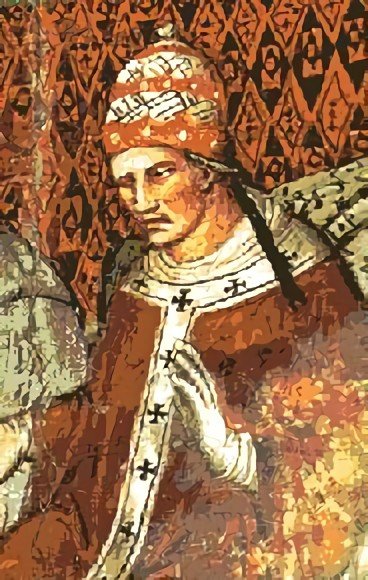
Pope Alexander III depicted in a fresco by Spinello Aretino (before 1410, Palazzo Pubblico in Siena)

Faced with a papal schism, Emperor Frederick Barbarossa summoned both Alexander and Victor to a council at Pavia in February 1160. Alexander refused, stating only God could judge a pope. The council of Pavia met from 5 to 11 February and recognized Victor IV's election as pope. Days later, Victor excommunicated Alexander, and in response Alexander excommunicated Frederick Barbarossa and Victor.

During the second year of his reign, Alexander lived in Rome, but after imperial armies captured the majority of the Papal States, he fled to Sicily and sought safety. He traveled to France in 1162 with his party on four galleys William I of Sicily furnished. Alexander ultimately reached France, after being delayed by a shipwreck after leaving Terracina, and from 1163 until 1165 he established his curia in Sens.

== Council ==
The Council met on 19 May 1163 at Tours, in the cathedral of St. Maurice. It main purpose was to declare the legitimacy of Alexander III's papacy and provide evidence of its power. The council was attended by 414 abbots, 124 archbishops and bishops, and seventeen cardinals. The attendees respresented the Angevin Empire, France, Portugal, Scotland, and the Spanish kingdoms. Only one bishop from the Holy Roman Empire was in attendance, Albert of Friesing. At the outset of the Council, a sermon was given by bishop Arnulf of Lisieux calling for a unified church.

=== Decrees ===
==== Excommunication ====
The first act by the Council was to restate the ban of excommunication of Pope Victor IV. The renewed excommunication, previously imposed at the Council of Montpellier, omitted Emperor Frederick Barbarossa's name. Alexander stated, "We exclude the emperor, whom I wish to reconcile to us on these matters." Despite Alexander's charity, Frederick Barbarossa would support Paschal III following Victor IV's death in 1164.

==== Heresy ====
Building on previous measures by the Council of Montpellier, the Cathars in Languedoc faced severe punishments enacted by the Council. Ian Robinson, professor of history at Trinity College, however, contends that the Council of Tours was the first to address the issue of Albigensians in southern France. The council declared the Albigensians heretics, decreed that secular princes jail them, seize their lands, and banned commercial trade with them. According to Robert Ian Moore, professor emeritus of history at Newcastle University, the Council's call for the annihilation of the Albigensians, as they were, "spreading like a cancer from Toulouse through Gascony and neighbouring regions", could be seen as a formal declaration of war on heresy.

==== Doctrine ====
The council debated, inconclusively, Peter Lombard's Four Books of Sentences, and the christological opinions expressed within it. Although, in a decree that was later published at Veroli on 28 May 1170, Alexander censured Peter Lombard.

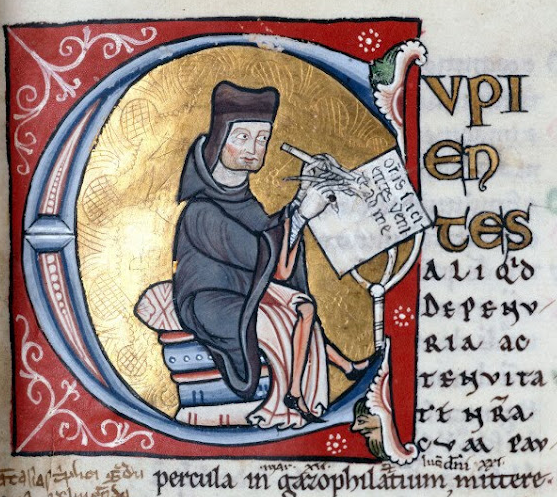
Peter Lombard

==== Division of Benefices ====
Alexander explicitly condemned the dividing of benefices, even writing post-Council letters to this effect. The problem of promising benefices before they became vacant, however, was not addressed at the Council.

==== Clerical usury ====
The council condemned usury and threatened the loss of ecclesiastical office for any cleric who loaned money.

==== Canonizations ====
Archbishop Thomas Becket wrote a compelling request for the canonization of Anselm of Canterbury. Alexander, however, understood the political climate between Becket and King Henry II, and remitted the decision to a provincial council in England. Alexander wanted any conflict to be between Henry II and Becket, possibly even Roger of York, but not between himself and Henry II.

Anselm of Canterbury

There were numerous other applications for canonization but these were also postponed by Alexander III.

== Aftermath ==
Alexander III's chancery sent up to nine letters or judgements each day in the weeks after the Council at Tours.

Following the Council of Tours, claims that heretics were numerous, brazen, and deeply ingrained in the county of Toulouse immediately followed. A meeting called at Lombers, in 1165, with the goal of ensuring that the Council's directives were being carried out, resulted in the Albigensians defying the assembled secular and ecclesiastical notables of the area, denouncing the church as corrupt, and refusing to confirm by oath their own assertions of Catholic orthodoxy. The severity of the situation eventually prompted the deployment of a papal legation in 1178, mostly funded by Louis VII and Henry II, who applied significant pressure. These reports were given to legates of the Third Lateran Council the following year.

Canons from the council were incorporated into the Liber Extra as well as other decretal collections. The Council of Tours, though not initially labeled, would later be referred to as a "general council" by Boso and William of Newburgh.

== Sources ==
- Collins, Roger (2009). Keepers Of The Keys Of Heaven: A History Of The Papacy. Basic Books.
- Duggan, Anne (2016). "Master of the Decretals:A Reassessment of Alexander III's Contribution to Canon Law". In Duggan, Anne J.; Clarke, Peter D. (eds.). Pope Alexander III (1159–81): The Art of Survival. Routledge. pp. 365–418.
- Freed, John (2016). Frederick Barbarossa: The Prince and the Myth. Yale University Press.
- Hosler, John D. (2007). "Henry II, William of Newburgh, and the Development of English Anti-Judaism". In Frassetto, Michael (ed.). Christian Attitudes Toward the Jews in the Middle Ages: A Casebook. Routledge.
- Luscombe, David (2004). "Thought and Learning". In Luscombe, David; Riley-Smith, Jonathan (eds.). The New Cambridge Medieval History. Vol. 4, c.1024 – c.1198, Part 1. Cambridge University Press. pp. 461–499.
- Moore, R. I. (2008). "The war against heresy in medieval Europe*". Historical Research. 81, no. 212 (May): 189–210.
- Nelson, Janet L. (1972). "Society, Theodicy and the origins of heresy: towards a reassessment of the medieval evidence". In Baker, Derek (ed.). Schism, Heresy and Religious Protest. Cambridge at the University Press. pp. 65–78.
- Pennington, Kenneth (2002). "Pope Alexander III". In Coppa, Frank J. (ed.). The Great Popes through History: An Encyclopedia. Greenwood Press. pp. 113–122.
- Robinson, I. S. (1990). The Papacy, 1073-1198: Continuity and Innovation. Cambridge University Press.
- Robinson, I.S. (2004). "The papacy, 1122-1197". In Luscombe, David; Riley-Smith, Jonathan (eds.). The New Cambridge Medieval History. Vol. 4, c.1024 – c.1198, Part 2. Cambridge University Press. pp. 317–383.
- Somerville, Robert (1977). Pope Alexander III And the Council of Tours. University of California Press.
- Stantchev, Stefan K. (2014). Spiritual Rationality: Papal Embargo as Cultural Practice. Oxford University Press.
- Suger (2018). Selected Works of Abbot Suger of Saint Denis. Translated by Cusimano, Richard; Whitmore, Eric. The Catholic University of America Press.
- Summerlin, Danica (2016). "Papal Councils in the High Middle Ages". In Larson, Atria; Sisson, Keith (eds.). A Companion to the Medieval Papacy. Brill. pp. 174–196.
- Summerlin, Danica (2019). The Canons of the Third Lateran Council of 1179: Their Origins and Reception. Cambridge University Press.
