= Paganelli =

Paganelli is an Italian surname, and may refer to:

- Carl Paganelli (b. 1960), American football official in the National Football League
- Domenico Paganelli, Italian architect
- Giuseppe Antonio Paganelli, Italian singer and composer
- Laurent Paganelli (b. 1962), French former footballer
- Manuello Paganelli (b. 1960), American artist and photographer
- Mirco Paganelli, Italian former footballer
- Niccolò Paganelli (1538–1620), Italian painter
- Pietro dei Paganelli di Montemagno (1080–1153), later became Pope Eugene III
- Umberto Paganelli, Italian artistic roller skating

== See also ==
- Paganini (disambiguation)
