= Antipope Callixtus III =

Antipope from 1168 to 1178

- Elected: September 1168
- Papacy began: September 1168
- Papacy ended: 29 August 1178
- Predecessor: Roman claimant: Alexander III; Antipapal claimant: Paschal III
- Successor: Roman claimant: Alexander III; Antipapal claimant: Innocent III
- Opposed to: Pope Alexander III
- Previous posts: Cardinal-bishop of Albano; Abbot of Struma

Personal details
- Died: Between 1180 and 1184
- Residence: Viterbo, Lazio, Italy

Callixtus III (also Calixtus III or Callistus III; died between 1180 and 1184) was an antipope from September 1168 until his resignation in August 1178. He was the third antipope elected in opposition to Pope Alexander III during the latter's struggle with the Emperor Frederick Barbarossa.

Callixtus' baptismal name was John. He entered the Vallombrosan monastery of Struma near Arezzo as a boy. In November 1158, the emperor placed the Vallombrosan under imperial protection. By that time, John was the abbot of Struma and one of the most important supporters of the emperor in Tuscany. After the disputed papal election of 1159, he supported the imperial candidate Victor IV over Alexander III. He was rewarded by Victor with the cardinal-bishopric of Albano, but was not immediately consecrated, rather continuing on as abbot.

After the death of Victor's successor, Paschal III, on 20 September 1168, his supporters gathered in Rome to elect a new (anti-)pope. John was chosen that same month. He took the name Callixtus and sent Umfredo, (pseudo-)cardinal of Santa Susanna, to Germany to inform Frederick of his election. He found the emperor at an imperial diet in Bamberg in June 1169. Frederick, who was in negotiations with Alexander III to end the schism at the time, did not immediately recognize Callixtus' election. According to Cardinal Boso of Santa Pudenziana, a partisan of Alexander III, Frederick was "inwardly deeply grieved" by the election of Callixtus, whom he had never met. Nevertheless, Frederick expressed his intention to go with an army to Italy in 1170 to restore the unity of the Church. No such expedition took place, however.

Late in 1169, Callixtus sent Umfredo and Sigewin, cardinal-bishop of Viterbo, as legates to Germany. They brought a pallium for Baldwin I, the new archbishop of Bremen. Frederick ordered a collection in Germany for Callixtus. Frederick recognized Callixtus only after his negotiations with Alexander broke down. The antipope was primarily a bargaining chip with which the emperor could pressure Alexander, and had only limited geographical support in comparison to Victor IV and Paschal III. He held Rome itself, but was acknowledged only in part of the Papal States, in his native Tuscany and in the Rhineland. He and his legates issued privileges for several monasteries in the Upper Rhineland. He mainly resided in Viterbo.

In 1173, Callixtus sent Martin, cardinal-bishop of Tusculum, to Germany as legate to help mediate an alliance between Frederick and King Louis VII of France. For the next three years nothing is known of Callixtus' activities. Frederick, when it became politically expedient, after the defeat of Legnano, switched his backing to Alexander. In November 1176, he signed the Pact of Anagni, which did, however, protect Callixtus by granting him an abbacy and restoring the cardinals he had created to their former offices. These terms were confirmed in the final Peace of Venice in July 1177.

Callixtus did not immediately recognize the Peace of Venice, but in 1178 Archbishop Christian of Mainz, the imperial chancellor, marched an army into Italy to retake the Papal State and Rome for Alexander. This rendered Callixtus' position at Viterbo untenable, and he fled to Monte Albano. On 29 August 1178, Callixtus submitted to Alexander III at Tusculum and abjured the schism. The pope entertained him with a feast. Some of his obstinate partisans sought to substitute a new antipope, and chose one Lando di Sezze under the name of Innocent III.

Alexander appointed Callixtus rector of Benevento. He still held that position in 1180, but by 1184, he was dead.
