= Pavanelli =

Pavanelli is an Italian surname. Notable people with the surname include:

- Livio Pavanelli (1881–1958), Italian film actor
- Rosa Pavanelli (born 1955), Italian trade union leader

== See also ==
- Paganelli
