= Cardinals created by Anastasius IV =

Catholic appointments in 1153

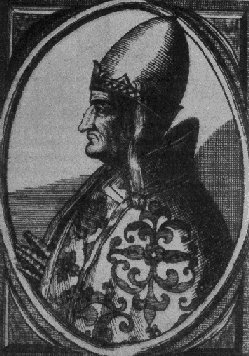
Pope Anastasius IV.

Pope Anastasius IV (r. 1153–54) created three cardinals in one consistory held during his pontificate.

== December 1153 ==
- Gregorio della Suburra
- Alberto
- Jacopo

== Sources ==
- Miranda, Salvador. "Consistories for the creation of Cardinals 12th Century (1099-1198): Anastasius IV". The Cardinals of the Holy Roman Church. Florida International University. OCLC 53276621.
