= Capelli =

Capelli is an Italian surname meaning hair (plural). Notable people with the surname include:

- Adler Capelli (born 1973), Italian former track cyclist
- Alfredo Capelli (1855–1910), Italian mathematician
- Angelo Felice Capelli (1681–1749), Italian mathematician
- Ather Capelli (1902–1944), Italian journalist
- Camillo Capelli (16th-century), Italian painter
- Claudio Capelli (born 1986), Swiss artistic gymnast
- Daniele Capelli (born 1986), Italian footballer
- Ermanno Capelli (born 1985), Italian professional road racing cyclist
- Francis Alphonse Capelli, the real name of Frank A. Capell (1907–1980), American author
- Francesco Capelli (fl. 1568), Italian painter
- Giovanni Maria Capelli (1648–1726), Italian composer
- Ivan Capelli (born 1963), Italian former Formula One driver
- Javier Capelli (born 1985), Argentine footballer
- Joseph Capelli, fictional character in Resistance, and main protagonist in Resistance 3
- Monia Capelli (born 1969), former Italian long-distance runner
- Pietro Capelli (c. 1700 – 1724 or 1727), Italian painter of the Rococo
- Vincenzo Capelli (born 1988), Italian rower

== Fictional characters ==
- Andy Capelli, fictional character in General Hospital

== See also ==
- Capelli's identity in mathematics
- Capelli Sport, an American sportswear company
- Capello
