= Jordan of Santa Susanna =

Carthusian monk

Jordan (Italian: Giordano Bobone Orsini; died after 1154) was a Carthusian monk, created Cardinal Deacon by Pope Lucius II in December 1144 and then Cardinal Priest of Santa Susanna by Eugene III on 21 December 1145. He is often referred to as a member of the Roman family of the Orsini, but more recent research concludes that he was probably a Frenchman. He served as Camerlengo of the Holy Roman Church under Eugene III (attested 8 March 1147 until 1151) and subscribed the papal bulls between 9 January 1145 and 11 June 1154.

He was described by John of Salisbury as mean and parsimonious and dressing in filthy rags as a gesture of austerity. When he was sent with Octavian of Santa Cecilia as a papal legate to summon Conrad III of Germany to Italy to be crowned Holy Roman Emperor, he quarrelled with his co-legate and, in the words of Salisbury, "made the Church a laughingstock."

He participated in the papal election of 1153 and perhaps also in the papal election of 1154. The date of his death is uncertain.

== Sources ==
- Norwich, John Julius. The Kingdom in the Sun 1130-1194. London: Longmans, 1970.
