= Hugh of Ostia =

Hugh or Hugo of Ostia (Italian: Ugo d'Ostia) may refer to:

- Hugh of Ostia (died 1158), cardinal-bishop of Ostia from 1150
- Pope Gregory IX, born Ugolino, cardinal-bishop of Ostia in 1206–1227
- Hugh of Saint-Cher, cardinal-bishop of Ostia in 1261–1262
- Hugh Aycelin, cardinal-bishop of Ostia in 1294–1297
