= Gerardo Caccianemici =

Gerardo Caccianemici may refer to:

- Pope Lucius II (1144–1145)
- Gerardo Caccianemici (cardinal), cardinal-deacon (1145–1155)
