= Gregorio della Suburra =

Italian cardinal

Gregorio della Suburra (died 1162/63) was an Italian cardinal, created by Pope Innocent II in 1140, as priest of the title of S. Maria in Trastevere. He was nephew of Pope Anastasius IV, who promoted him to suburbicarian see of Sabina in September 1154.

After the double papal election in September 1159, he supported the obedience of Pope Alexander III. He became Dean of the Sacred College of Cardinals in 1159, after the deposition of Cardinal Icmar of Tusculum, who had consecrated Antipope Victor IV (1159-1164) and joined his obedience. He was papal vicar at Rome in 1160. His name appears for the last time in the papal bull dated 20 September 1162.

== Bibliography ==
- Johannes M. Brixius, Die Mitglieder des Kardinalskollegiums von 1130-1181, Berlin 1912, p. 57 no. 1 and p. 112 note 136
- Barbara Zenker, Die Mitglieder des Kardinalskollegiums von 1130 bis 1159, Würzburg 1964, p. 48-51
- Miranda, Salvador. "SUBURRA, Gregorio della (?-1163)". The Cardinals of the Holy Roman Church. Florida International University Libraries. OCLC 53276621.
