= Third Council of the Lateran =

Ecumenical council

- Date: 1179
- Accepted by: Catholic Church
- Previous council: Second Council of the Lateran
- Next council: Fourth Council of the Lateran
- Convoked by: Pope Alexander III
- President: Pope Alexander III
- Attendance: 302
- Topics: Catharism and Waldensianism, church discipline
- Documents and statements: twenty-seven canons, limitation of papal election to the cardinals, condemnation of simony

The Third Council of the Lateran met in Rome in March 1179. Pope Alexander III presided and 302 bishops attended. The Catholic Church regards it as the eleventh ecumenical council.

== Aftermath of the Peace of Venice and end of a schism ==
By agreement reached at the Peace of Venice in 1177 the bitter conflict between Alexander III and Emperor Frederick I was brought to an end. When Pope Adrian IV died in 1159, the divided cardinals elected two popes: Roland of Siena, who took the name of Alexander III, and Octavian of Rome who, though nominated by fewer cardinals, was supported by Frederick and assumed the name of Pope Victor IV. Frederick, wishing to remove all that stood in the way of his authority in Italy, declared war upon the Italian states and especially the Church which was enjoying great authority. A serious schism arose out of this conflict, and after Victor IV's death in 1164, two further antipopes were nominated in opposition to Alexander III: Paschal III (1164–1168) and Callistus III (1168–1178). Eventually, at the Peace of Venice, when Alexander gained victory, he promised Frederick that he would summon an ecumenical council.

== Condemnation of the Cathars and legislation against sodomy ==
Besides removing the remains of the recent schism, the Council condemned the Cathar heresies and pushed for the restoration of ecclesiastical discipline. It also became the first general Council of the Church to legislate against sodomy. Three sessions were held, on 5, 14, and 19 March, in which 27 canons were promulgated.

== Canons ==
The most important of these canons were:

- Canon 1. In order to prevent the possibility of future schisms, only cardinals were to possess the right to elect a pope. In addition a two-thirds majority was to be required in order for the election to be valid. If any candidate should declare himself pope without receiving the required majority, he and his supporters were to be excommunicated.
- Canon 2 declared null and void those ordinations performed by the antipopes Octavian (Victor IV), Guy of Crema (Paschal III), and John de Struma (Callixtus III).
- Canon 3 forbade the promotion of anyone to a parish before the age of 25 and to the episcopate before the age of 30.
- Canon 5 forbade the ordination of clerics not provided with any means of proper support.
- Canon 7 forbade the charging of money to conduct burials, bless a marriage or indeed the celebration of any of the sacraments.
- Canon 11 forbade clerics to have women in their houses or to visit the monasteries of nuns without a good reason; declared that married clergy should lose their benefices; and decreed that priests who engaged in "that unnatural vice for which the wrath of God came down upon the sons of disobedience and destroyed the five cities with fire" (sodomy) should be deposed from clerical office and required to do penance—while laymen should be excommunicated.
- Canon 18 required every cathedral church to appoint a master to teach the clerics and the poor scholars of the church; this action helped launch the cathedral schools that later became universities. It also regulated the license to teach (licentia docendi), stating "let no one demand any money for a licence to teach, or under cover of some custom seek anything from teachers, or forbid anyone to teach who is suitable and has sought a licence." Selling the license to teach could prevent the progress of churches.
- Canon 19 declared excommunication for those who tried to tax churches and clergy without the consent of the bishop.
- Canon 23 concerns the proper organisation of accommodation for lepers.
- Canon 25 excommunicated those who engage in usury.
- Canon 26 forbade Jews and Muslims from having Christian servants and states that the evidence of Christians is always to be accepted against Jews. It also excommunicates any Christian who lives with a Jew or Muslim.
- Canon 27 stressed the duty of princes to repress heresy and condemned "the Brabantians, Aragonese, Basques, Navarrese, and others who practice such cruelty toward Christians that they respect neither churches nor monasteries, spare neither widows nor orphans, neither age nor sex, but after the manner of pagans, destroy and lay waste everything" (De Brabantionibus et Aragonensibus, Navariis, Bascolis, Coterellis et Triaverdinis, qui tantam in Christianos immanitatem exercent, ut nec ecclesiis, nec monasteriis deferant, non viduis, et pupillis, non senibus, et pueris, nec cuilibet parcant aetati, aut sexui, sed more paganorum omnia perdant, et vastent).

== William of Tyre as the representative of the Kingdom of Jerusalem ==
Among the many attendees at the Council was William of Tyre, the historian and, at the time, archbishop of Tyre. William was sent by Baldwin IV as the representative of the Kingdom of Jerusalem, and wrote about the journey to the Council in his history. The Kingdom of Hungary was represented by Andrew, Archbishop of Kalocsa.

== Henry the Lion lobbying against the Archbishop-elect of Bremen ==
Archbishop-elect Berthold of Bremen attended, expecting to have his election confirmed although he had not taken major orders. His presence was resented by the other archbishops and the lobbying of Duke Henry the Lion of Saxony succeeded in getting his election quashed. His former teacher, Girard la Pucelle, spoke unavailingly in his defence.

== Effects ==
Due to the 26th canon forbidding Christians from dwelling among Jews and Muslims, segregation laws were occasionally enforced by European governments against Jews, creating Jewish quarters. Later in Venice, the term ghetto was born from a segregated Jewish quarter.

== Bibliography ==
- Summerlin, Danica (2019). The Canons of the Third Lateran Council of 1179: Their Origins and Reception. Cambridge University Press. ISBN 978-1-107-14582-5.
