= Francesco Capelli =

Italian painter

Francesco Capelli (active c. 1568) was an Italian painter. He was born in Sassuolo in the province of Modena, and was educated in the school of Correggio. He painted a 'Madonna and Child in Glory with attendant Saints' for the church of San Sebastian at Sassuolo. He was also called Caccianemici, but must not be confused with another Francesco Caccianemici, a contemporary pupil of Primaticcio, and lived about the same period.
