= Nicolò Paganini =

Nicolò Paganini may refer to:

- Niccolò Paganini (1782–1840), Italian violinist and composer
- Nicolò Paganini's numbers (c. 1850–?), Italian mathematician who found a pair of amicable numbers

== See also ==
- Paganini (disambiguation)
