= Odone Fattiboni =

Odone Fattiboni, also known as Odone Bonecase, Odo, Oddo, Otto or Ottone Fattiboni (? – 1162), was an Italian Catholic cardinal and bishop.

He was born in Rome to an aristocratic family.

Pope Innocent II created him cardinal deacon in the consistory of 1130 with the title of San Giorgio in Velabro.

In 1145, he became Cardinal protodeacon.
In 1155, he was appointed Bishop of Cesena.
He died in 1162, but where is not known.

== Conclaves ==
During his time as a cardinal he participated in the following papal elections:

- 1143 papal election, which elected Pope Celestine II
- 1144 papal election, which elected Pope Lucius II
- 1145 papal election, which elected Pope Eugene III
- 1153 papal election, which elected Pope Anastasius IV
- 1154 papal election, which elected Pope Adrian IV
- 1159 papal election, which elected Pope Alexander III

== Sources ==
- Salvador Miranda, FATTIBONI, Odone, on fiu.edu – The Cardinals of the Holy Roman Church, Florida International University.
- Brixius, Johannes Matthias. Die Mitglieder des Kardinalkollegiums von 1130–1181. Berlin : R. Trenkel, 1912, p. 45, no. 35
