= Niccolò Paganelli =

Italian painter

Niccolò Paganelli (7 December 1538 – 1620) was an Italian painter of the late Renaissance period.

Born in Faenza to an aristocratic family, he initially trained locally, then moved to Rome for a number of years. He returned to Faenza, where he painted both sacred subjects and portraits. Few paintings of his are known; one altarpiece in the Pinacoteca of Faenza, depicting the Presentation of Jesus at the Temple (circa 1585), portrays a crowded, mannerist scene, recalling works of Giulio Romano.
