= Boso (cardinal of Santa Pudenziana) =

Italian prelate and Cardinal of the Roman Catholic church

Boso (death 1178) was an Italian prelate and Cardinal of the Roman Catholic church.

== Origins ==
According to the older historiography, Boso was an Englishman from St Albans and nephew of Nicholas Breakspear, future Pope Adrian IV, on his mother's side. He ostensibly joined the Order of Benedictines at St Albans Abbey in the young age, and then entered the Roman Curia when his uncle Nicholas became cardinal. Shortly after his uncle’s 1154 election to the papacy, Boso was promoted to the cardinalate.

This view was still accepted at the beginning of the 20th century, but subsequently was challenged by a number of scholars. Johannes M. Brixius (1912) undermined the tradition identifying him as a nephew of Adrian IV and a Benedictine monk. He showed that neither his relationship to Adrian IV nor his belonging to the Order of Benedictines is attested in any of the contemporary sources, while papal privileges for Boso's titular church of Santa Pudenziana attached this title to the canons regular of Santa Maria di Reno.

Brixius concluded that Boso must have been a member of this religious community, and not a Benedictine. However, he still considered him an Englishman.

The monograph of F. Geisthardt (1936) about Cardinal Boso refuted almost all elements of his traditional biography concerning the period before his promotion to the cardinalate. He has proven that Boso's curial career much predated the career of his alleged uncle Nicholas Breakspear. He served at the papal curia from at least 1135, as member of the household of cardinal Guido of SS. Cosma e Damiano from Pisa, and it was Guido, not Nicholas, who was his early protector at the papal court. Geisthardt has established that Boso was born probably at Loppia near Lucca in the March of Tuscany. His conclusions are now accepted in academic literature.

== Life ==
Born in Tuscany, Boso joined the canons regular of Santa Maria di Reno at Bologna. In 1135, he entered the service of cardinal Guido of SS. Cosma e Damiano and accompanied him in his legatine mission to Spain in 1143. After Guido's death in autumn 1149 Boso replaced him as director of papal chancery, though without the title of chancellor. He occupied that post until 3 May 1153.

When Nicholas Breakspear became Pope Adrian IV in December 1154, he appointed Boso to the important post of Camerlengo of the Holy Roman Church and confided to him the governorship of the Castle of Sant' Angelo, being somewhat suspicious of the fidelity of the Roman populace. Two years later, on 21 December 1156, the same pope named him cardinal-deacon of SS. Cosma e Damiano; as such, he subscribed papal bulls between 4 January 1157 and 1 August 1165.

When Adrian IV died in 1159, dissensions arose in the conclave as to the choice of his successor, the result of which was the creation of a schism lasting seventeen years. Four cardinals in the imperial interest voted for Cardinal Octavian, who assumed the name of Victor IV, but he was acknowledged only by the Germans. On the very day of Adrian's burial in the Vatican basilica, 5 September, Cardinal Boso, who appears to have taken the lead, withdrew with the majority, twenty-three, of the cardinals within the fortress of Sant' Angelo to escape the vengeance of the antipope. They immedediately elected as pope Cardinal Rolando Bandinelli of Siena, who was consecrated under the name of Pope Alexander III.

The new pope was mindful of his obligations to Boso, and soon (no later than 18 March 1166) promoted him Cardinal-Priest of the title of Santa Pudenziana (subscribed the bulls with this title between 18 March 1166 and 29 July 1178). Boso, though dismissed as camerlengo, was subsequently entrusted with several important missions in Northern Italy (1160/61, 1162, 1173/74, 1177). When Alexander made his journey to Venice to receive the submission and allegiance of the Emperor Frederick II, and to ratify the Peace of Venice (24 June 1177) which closed the schism, he was accompanied by Boso.

He died in 1178, perhaps on 12 September. Anne J. Duggan has described Boso as being one "whose knowledge of Papal and ecclesiastical precedent was probably unrivalled" during his life.

== Works ==
Boso had a reputation not only for piety, but also for learning, and was esteemed by contemporary writers as among the most eminent theologians of his age. He compiled or wrote the lives of several eleventh and twelfth century popes, among them the lives of Adrian IV and Alexander III. He was also a poet, examples of his poetry powers still existing in the Cotton MSS in the British Library, in the form of metrical lives of saints.
