= Paganini (disambiguation) =

Niccolò Paganini (1782–1840) was an Italian violinist, violist, guitarist and composer.

Paganini may also refer to:

== Music ==
- Paganini (operetta), an operetta by Franz Lehár
- Paganini Competition, a violin competition started in 1954
- Paganini Quartet, a string quartet started in 1946
- Paganini (band), a Swiss hard rock band

== Films ==
- Paganini (1923 film), a German silent historical film
- Paganini (1934 film), also known as I Liked Kissing Women
- Paganini (1989 film), also known as Kinski Paganini

== People ==
- Alexia Paganini, Swiss-American figure skater
- Fernando Paganini, Uruguayan engineer
- Luca Paganini, Italian footballer
- Omar Paganini, Uruguayan electrical engineer
- Paganino Paganini (c. 1450–1538), Italian publisher
- Ricardo Paganini, Argentine rugby union player
- Rubén Pagnanini, Argentine football player
- Sam Paganini, Italian DJ
- Tamara Paganini, Argentine dancer and actress

== Other uses ==
- Paganini, a typeface by Nebiolo Printech
- 2859 Paganini, a minor planet named after the violinist

== See also ==
- Nicolò Paganini (disambiguation)
