= Ghisolabella Caccianemico =

13th-century Bolognese noblewoman

Ghisolabella Caccianemico (Bologna, c. 13th century CE), also known as Ghislabella or Ghisolabella dei Caccianemici, was a noblewoman from a prominent Guelph family from Bologna. She was married to Niccolò dei Fontana, a nobleman from Ferrara, but she is primarily known for having been sold into prostitution to Obizzo II d'Este, Marquis of Ferrara by her brother, Venedico Caccianemico. Ghisolabella's story was famously included by Dante Alighieri in his poem, the Divine Comedy.

== Biography ==
Ghisolabella was born into a noble family of the Guelph political faction of Bologna, the Caccianemico. Her father was Alberto Caccianemico dell'Orso; her brother, Venedico Caccianemico, was a renowned political figure in several Northern Italian city-states. Ghisolabella's exact date of birth is unknown, but her brother, Venedico, was likely born in 1228; thus, it is possible that she was also born around this time.

She married Niccolò dei Fontana, a nobleman from Ferrara. However, Venedico sold Ghisolabella into prostitution for the powerful Marquis of Ferrara, Obizzo II d'Este. It is suspected that Venedico's motive was to attempt to gain political favor from the marquis. There is debate surrounding whether this fateful event occurred before or after her marriage to Niccolò, but it is commonly believed to have happened after her marriage. Ghisolabella's extramarital relation with the marquis, though against her will, was ruinous to her marriage with Niccolò and to her status. The news surrounding this event became a popular topic of discussion among Bolognese society at the time. After one of Ghisolabella's servants supposedly made a rude comment about the event, the servant was subsequently fired. There is also record of Ghisolabella and Niccolò living in separate city-states for multiple years. This was likely a result of the fateful event involving the marquis.

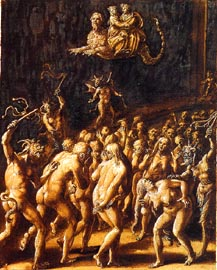
Panders and seducers in Malebolge, illustrated by Giovanni Stradano (1587)

It is speculated that she died near the end of the 13th century.

== Role in Dante's Divine Comedy ==
=== Overview ===
Ghisolabella is referenced in Inferno XVIII, when Dante and Virgil enter the eighth Circle of Hell, known as Malebolge. In the first ditch of Malebolge, Dante and Virgil encounter two groups of sinners: the seducers and the panders. Among the panders, Dante recognizes Venedico, who is forced to walk in a circle and endure whippings by demons. Dante condemns Venedico for selling his own sister's body, through double-edged language, such as "Ma che ti mena a sì pungenti salse?" ("But what doth bring thee to such pungent sauces?" Longfellow, The Divine Comedy) (Inferno XVIII, 51), and creation of Venedico's cruelly just punishment.

=== Significance ===
During the thirteenth century, news and gossip surrounding Ghisolabella and Obizzo II was likely to remain geographically and temporally limited. Dante often makes reference to historical or literary figures in his Divine Comedy, but his inclusion of Ghisolabella eternalizes Venedico's sin and serves as an example of immorality.

There has been much scholarly discussion on Dante's portrayal and treatment of women in the Divine Comedy. Critics point to Dante's emphasis on women as objects for sexual or reproductive means, rather than highlighting their full characters. Dante's portrayal of women in Inferno, in particular, as both sexually desirable and morally repulsive is typically regarded as misogynistic.

However, Dante's reference to Ghisolabella does not completely fit with this line of discussion. Dante considered his Divine Comedy a sacrato poema (Paradiso XXIII, 62), or sacred poem. His aim was to put forth moral guidelines, based in Christian scripture, that would lead one through the journey toward God. Although Dante generally portrays prostitutes poorly, such as Thaïs (Inferno XVIII, 127–136), he does not portray Ghisolabella in this same way. Rather, her inclusion is used toward the aim of condemning her greed-driven brother, Venedico.

== Legacy ==
The Italian playwright, Gabriele d'Annunzio, was particularly inspired by Dante's Divine Comedy and Vita Nuova, and referenced Ghisolabella's story in his play Francesca da Rimini (Rome, 1901). D'Annunzio was also in love with his muse, Eleanora Duse, and often referred to her using the nickname, "Ghìsola." This nickname, along with other variations on the name, such as "Ghixolabella" and "Ghislabella," have been used to indicate a beautiful woman.
