= Manuello Paganelli =

Manuello Paganelli (born 1960) is a self-taught North American artist, author, humanistic and documentary photographer published across the world as well as a voice in the protection and value of photographer's copyright and their rights.

== Biography ==
Manuello Paganelli is a Cuban-Italian photographer. He was born in Santo Domingo and attended schools in Santo Domingo, Italy, and Puerto Rico. In the late 1970s, he attended Southern Adventist University, where he majored in both biology and chemistry, hoping to pursue a career in medicine. During his last year of college purchased his first camera. After reading a magazine article about Ansel Adams, Paganelli cold-called him, starting a mentorship that would last for the rest of Adams' life.

From early 1982 Paganelli began a friendship with legendary photographer Ansel Adams which continue until Adams passing in 1984. His first photographic monographs Cuba A Personal Journey: 1989-2015 was published in 2016 and the Guardian named it one of the top ten travel books to buy for Christmas. During the summer of 1983, a few weeks after his first conversation with Adams, Paganelli got his first photography job at the Chattanooga Times. He covered the 1984 Olympic Games in Los Angeles.

In 1985, Paganelli moved to Washington, DC, to work for Agence France Presse. After working there for seven months he began a freelance career, having grown tired of the poor treatment of photographers at that news agency. He quickly began selling work to The Washington Post, USA Today, and Reuters and Forbes. Since then, his clientele has grown and his photos have appeared on the covers and inside pages of Sports Illustrated, Life, Time, People, Newsweek, Business Week, Bloomberg, Der Stern, Der Spiegel, Entertainment Weekly, Vibe, and Reader's Digest. One of the highlights of his career is a photograph he took of Cal Ripken Jr after he broke Lou Gehrig's record for the most consecutive games played, which later appeared on the cover for Sports Illustrated in 1995.

In the summer of 2011, one of his images was selected for exhibition in the Art of Photography Show in San Diego.

In the summer of 2012, Paganelli was invited to showcase his Black Cowboys documentary series at the Saint Petersburg Manege in St Petersburg during the Photo Vernissage 2012.

In 2016 he published Cuba: A Personal Journey, Photographs 1989–2015, which was later named one of The Guardian's top 10 travel books for 2016

Paganelli currently resides in Carmel-By-The-Sea and in Los Angeles, California, while traveling the world creating fine arts images or as a freelance photographer, as well as leading photo workshop adventures to Cuba, South America, Europe, and Asia. [6].

== Projects ==
In addition to his lifelong work for magazines and advertising, Paganelli has also worked on many personal projects throughout his career.

=== Cuba documentary series ===
In the late 1980s, Paganelli was one of the few U.S. photographers allowed to visit Cuba. This work resulted in his first exhibit in 1995, earning him a fellowship award from the Virginia Commission for the Arts. Frank Van Riper reviewed the exhibit for the Washington Post and wrote "Manuello Paganelli's Cuban photographs are a brilliant window on a land and people too long hidden from North American eyes.[2] Working in the tradition of Cartier-Bresson and Robert Frank, Paganelli brings an artist's eyes and a native son's sensibility to his superb photographs." In an interview by the Richmond Times-Dispatch at the opening of his Cuba photo exhibit, Paganelli talks about meeting and photographing Gregorio Fuentes, whom Ernest Hemingway used as a model for The Old Man and the Sea. In the same interview, Paganelli talks about finding his long-lost family which was separated in 1959 after the Cuban revolution.

=== Cuba: A Personal Journey, Photographs 1989-2015 ===
In the fall of 2016, Paganelli released his documentary photography book Cuba: A Personal Journey, Photographs 1989-2015 with over 115 black and white images that celebrate Cuba—its cuisine, music, dance, and everyday life—persisting in the midst of varying political pressures and economical complexities. Articles about his book appeared in the British Journal of Photography and Fast Company as well as an interview with LensCulture.

=== Black Cowboys documentary series ===
In the early 1990s, Paganelli began working on his Black Cowboys series, sponsored by Emerge magazine. He traveled across the United States documenting the daily lives of black cowboys. In March 2009, his work was shown at the Annenberg Space for Photography in Los Angeles, California. In the summer of 2012, Paganelli was invited to present the series at the Saint Petersburg Manege Museum in St. Petersburg Russia during the Photo Vernissage.

=== Magazines ===
Paganelli's photos have appeared on the covers and inside pages of Sports Illustrated, Life, Time, People, Newsweek, Business Week, Bloomberg, Der Stern, Der Spiegel, Entertainment Weekly, Vibe, and Reader's Digest. He has photographed all kinds of celebrities including sports stars, actors and actresses, models, musicians and more.

=== Gallery Representation ===
Weston Gallery in Carmel, CA USA

Obscura Gallery in Santa Fe, New Mexico USA
