= Hugh of Ostia (died 1158) =

French Cistercian and Cardinal

Hugh or Hugo (died 1 December 1158) was a French Cistercian and Cardinal. He was born probably in the diocese of Beauvais and entered the order of Cistercians in Clairvaux. In 1147 he became abbot of Trois-Fontaines. Pope Eugenius III (also a Cistercian) created him Cardinal-Bishop of Ostia in the consistory celebrated probably in December 1151. He subscribed the papal bulls between 29 December 1151 and 24 January 1155 and participated in the papal election, 1153 and papal election, 1154. He corresponded with Bernard of Clairvaux. Cistercians venerated him as blessed.

== Bibliography ==
- J. M. Brixius, Die Mitglieder des Kardinalkollegiums von 1130-1181, Berlin 1912, p. 55 no. 11

Catholic Church titles
| Preceded by Guido de Summa | Cardinal-bishop of Ostia; 1151–1158 | Succeeded by Ubaldo Allucingoli |
