= Vicenzo Caccianemici =

Italian painter

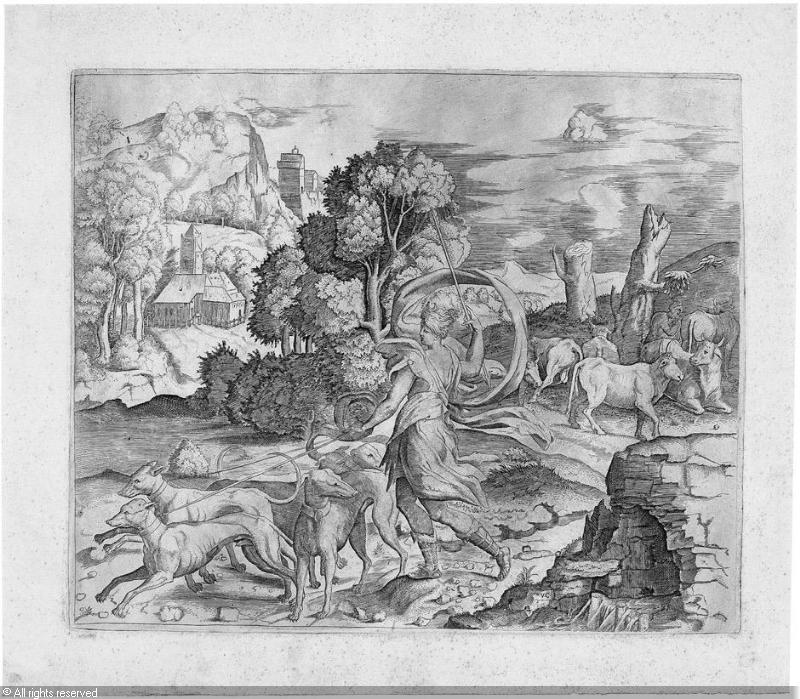
Engraving of Diana the Huntress by Caccianemici.

Vicenzo Caccianemici (active 1530) was an Italian painter of the Renaissance period. He was born in Bologna, and trained under Parmigianino. Vasari mentions a picture by this artist in the chapel of the family of Elefantuzzi in San Petronio at Bologna, representing The Decollation of St. John and another picture of the same subject, differently treated, in the Cappella Macchiavelli in San Stefano. There are a few etchings including Diana returning from the Chase and a Landscape, with a Nymph and Dogs, The Death of Abel, The Adoration of the Shepherds probably after a design by Parmigianino, and finally a St. Jerome in a Grotto.
