= Pope Anastasius IV =

Head of the Catholic Church from 1153 to 1154

- Bishop of Rome
- Church: Catholic Church
- Papacy began: 8 July 1153
- Papacy ended: 3 December 1154
- Predecessor: Eugene III
- Successor: Adrian IV

Orders
- Created cardinal: February 1114 by Paschal II

Personal details
- Born: Corrado Demetri della Suburra c. 1073 Rome, Papal States, Holy Roman Empire
- Died: 3 December 1154 (aged 80–81) Rome, Papal States, Holy Roman Empire
- Coat of arms

Pope Anastasius IV (c. 1073 – 3 December 1154), born Corrado Demetri della Suburra, was head of the Catholic Church and ruler of the Papal States from 8 July 1153 to his death in 1154. He is the most recent pope to take the name "Anastasius" upon his election.

== Early life ==
He was a Roman, son of Benedictus de Suburra, probably of the family of Demetri, and became a secular clerk. He was created cardinal-priest of S. Pudenziana by Pope Paschal II no later than in 1114. In 1127 or 1128, Pope Honorius II promoted him to the suburbicarian See of Sabina. He was probably given this position for siding with Honorius II during a dispute over the appointment of a new abbot of Farfa. He had taken part in the double papal election of 1130, had been one of the most determined opponents of Antipope Anacletus II and, when Pope Innocent II fled to France, had been left behind as his vicar in Italy. At the time of his election to the papacy in July 1153, he was Dean of the College of Cardinals and probably the oldest member of that body.

== Pontificate ==
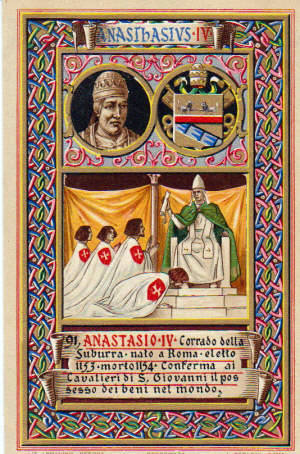
Image from a 19th-century religious card, showing Anastasius IV confirming the Knights Hospitaller in possession of their worldly property.

During his short pontificate, he played the part of a peacemaker; he came to terms with the Emperor Frederick Barbarossa in the vexing question of the appointment to the See of Magdeburg and closed the long quarrel, which had raged through four pontificates, about the appointment of William Fitzherbert (commonly known as Saint William of York) to the see of York by sending him the pallium in spite of the continued opposition of the powerful Cistercian order. Anastasius IV also devoted much time and expenses on the Lateran Basilica and Palace back at Rome.

Anastasius IV died on 3 December 1154 and was succeeded by Cardinal Nicholas Breakspear as Pope Adrian IV. Anastasius IV was laid to rest within the Helena sarcophagus which was brought out and reused as his tomb.

== See also ==
- List of popes
- Cardinals created by Anastasius IV

== Bibliography ==
- Klewitz, Hans Walter (1957). Reformpapsttum und Kardinalskolleg. Darmstadt. pp. 128 no. 31 and p. 220.
- Brixius, Johannes M. (1912). Die Mitglieder des Kardinalkollegiums von 1130–1181. Berlin.
- Robinson, Ian Stuart (1990). The Papacy, 1073–1198: Continuity and Innovation. New York: Cambridge University Press. ISBN 978-0521264983.
- Jaffé, Philipp (1851). Regesta pontificum Romanorum ab condita Ecclesia ad annum post Christum natum MCXCVIII. Berlin: Veit et Socius.

Catholic Church titles
| Preceded by Crescenzio | Cardinal-Bishop of Sabina; 1127/28–53 | Succeeded by Gregorio |
| Preceded by Guillaume | Dean of the College of Cardinals; 1139–54 | Succeeded by Imar of Tusculum |
| Preceded by Eugene III | Pope; 1153–54 | Succeeded by Adrian IV |
