= Imar of Tusculum =

French Benedictine abbot, bishop, and cardinal

Imar, O.S.B. Cluny (died at Cluny on 28 October 1161) was a French Benedictine abbot, who served as a bishop and cardinal.

== Life ==
In his youth, Imar became a monk at the Priory of Saint-Martin-des-Champs in Paris, a community belonging to the Cluniac Order, later being sent to the motherhouse of the Order, where he professed his solemn vows. Some time after that, he was elected as Abbot of the Abbey of Sainte-Marie la Neuve near Poitiers. He later served as the superior of the Priory of La Charité-sur-Loire, located near Nevers. He was a friend of St. Bernard of Clairvaux, who mentioned him in his letters.

Pope Innocent II appointed Imar the Cardinal-Bishop of Tusculum (whose seat was later moved to Frascati) in the consistory celebrated in March 1142, and he received the episcopal consecration from that pope in the Lateran Basilica later that month. He participated in the papal elections of September 1143, March 1144, July 1153 and December 1154, and signed as witness the papal bulls issued between 19 April 1142 and 18 February 1159. He served as papal legate to England during the pontificate of Pope Lucius II (1144–1145). He became Dean of the Sacred College of Cardinals in 1153.

After the double papal election of 1159, Imar became a supporter of the Antipope Victor IV and consecrated him to the episcopate in the Abbey of Farfa on 4 October 1159, with the assistance of the Bishops Ubaldo of Ferentino and Riccardo of Melfi. Due to this, he was excommunicated and deposed from his titles by Pope Alexander III, historically considered to be the legitimate pope. Imar then participated in the schismatic Council of Pavia of February 1160, which anathematized Alexander. Soon after this, he submitted to Alexander and retired to the Abbey of Cluny, where he died in 1161.
