= Francesco Caccianemici =

Italian painter

Francesco Caccianemici (16th century) was an Italian painter of the Renaissance period. He was born in Bologna, and trained under Primaticcio, whom he accompanied to work for the Court of King Francis I of France at Fontainebleau. He also worked there with Il Rosso.
