= Ubaldo Caccianemici =

Italian cardinal

Ubaldo Caccianemici (died 1171) was an Italian cardinal and cardinal-nephew of Pope Lucius II, his cousin who elevated him in May or June 1144.

Before his elevation to the cardinalate, he was canon regular of the Congregation of S. Frediano in Lucca. He was elevated to the cardinalate by his uncle shortly after his election to the papacy. He subscribed the papal bulls as Cardinal-Priest of S. Croce in Gerusalemme between 28 June 1144 and 12 September 1170. After the double papal election, 1159, he supported the obedience of Pope Alexander III and served as his legate at the council of Saint-Jean-de-Losne in 1162. He probably became protopriest of the Sacred College in 1158 or 1166.

== Bibliography ==
- J.M. Brixius, Die Mitglieder des Kardinalkollegiums von 1130-1181, Berlin 1912, p. 51 no. 4 and p. 103-104 no. 111
