= List of abbots of Monte Cassino =

This is a list of abbots of Monte Cassino.

Italian names are given in italics in parentheses for abbots before the third destruction of the abbey.

== 6th century ==
- Benedict of Nursia (Benedetta da Norcia) : from 525/529
- Constantine (Costantino) : 547–560?
- Simplicius (Simplicio) : 560?–576?
- Vitalis (Vitale) : 576?–580?
- Bonitus (Bonito) : 580?–584

Between c. 580 and c. 585, the abbey was pillaged and burned by the Lombards and abandoned by its monks.

== 8th century ==
- Petronax (Petronace) : 717?–747
- Optatus (Optato) : 747? – 760
- Ermeris (Ermeri) : 760–760
- Gratian (Graziano) : 760–764
- Tomichis (Tomichi) : 764–771
- Poto (Potone) : 771–777
- Theodemar (Teodemaro) : 777/778–796
- Gisulf (Gisolfo or Gisulfo) : 796–817

== 9th century ==
- Apollinaris (Apollinare) : 817–828
- Deusdedit (Diodato) : 828–834
- Hilderic (Ilderico) : 834–834
- Autpert (Autperto) : 834–837
- Bassacius (Bassacio) : 837–856
- Bertharius (Bertario) : 856–883

In 883, the abbey was destroyed by the Aghlabids and the monks moved to Teano and later Capua.

- Angelar I (Angelario) : 883–889
- Ragembrand (Ragembrando) : 890–899
- Leo (Leone or Leo) : 899–914

== 10th century ==
- John I (Giovanni) : 914–934
- Adelpert (Adelperto) : 934–943/944?
- Baldwin (Baldovino) : 943/944?–946
- Maielpot (Maielpoto) : 943/944?–948

With Aligern, the monks return to Monte Cassino.

- Aligern (Aligerno) : 948–985
- Manso (Mansone) : 986–996
- John II (Giovanni) : 996–997
- John III (Giovanni) : 997–1010

== 11th century ==
- John IV (Giovanni IV) : 1010–1011
- Atenulf (Atenolfo) : 1011–1022
- Theobald (Teobaldo) : 1022–1035
- Basil (Basilio) : 1036–1038
- Richer I (Richerio) : 1038–1055
- Peter I (Pietro) : 1055–1057
- Frederick (Federico) : 1057–1058
- Desiderius or Daufer (Desiderio or Dauferio) : 1058–1087
- Oderisius I (Oderisio) : 1087–1105

== 12th century ==
- Otto (Ottone) : 1105–1107
- Bruno (Bruno) : 1107–1111
- Gerard (Gerardo) : 1111–1123
- Oderisius II (Oderisio) : 1123–1126
- Nicholas I (Nicola) : 1126–1127
- Seniorectus (Senioretto) : 1127–1137
- Rainald I (Rainaldo) : 1137
- Wibald (Guibaldo or Wibaldo) : 1137
- Rainald II (Rainaldo II) : 1137–1166
- Theodin I (Teodino) : 1166–1167
- Giles or Aegidius (Egidio) : 1168
  - Peter (Pietro) : 1168–1171 (apostolic administrator)
- Dominic (Domenico) : 1171–1174
- Peter II (Pietro II) : 1174–1186
- Roffred (Roffredo dell'Isola) : 1188–1210

== 13th century ==
- Peter III (Pietro III) : 1210–1211
- Adenulf of Caserta (Adenolfo) : 1211–1215
- Stephen I (Stefano) : 1215–1227
- Landulf Sinibald (Landolfo Sinibaldo) : 1227–1236
  - Pandulf (Pandolfo) : 1237–1238 (apostolic administrator)
- Stephen II (Stefano) : 1238–1248
- Nicholas II (Nicola) : 1251 - ?
- Richard (Riccardo) : 1252–1262
- Theodin II (Teodino II) : 1262–1263
- Bernard Ayglerius (Bernardo Aiglerio) : 1263–1282
- Thomas I (Tommaso) : 1285–1288
- Ponce (Ponzio) : 1292–1292
- William (Guglielmo) : 1293–1294?
- Angelar II (Angelario II) : 1294–1295
- Berard (Beraudo) : 1295–1295
  - Bernard (Bernardo) : 1295–1296 (apostolic administrator)
- Galard (Galardo) : 1296–1301

== 14th century ==
- Thomas II (Tommaso II) : 1304–?
- Marinus (Marino) : 1306–1313
- Isnard de Pontevès (Isnardo) : ?–?
  - Oddone della Sala : 1323–1326 (apostolic administrator)

From Raymond on, the abbots are bishops.

- Raymond de Gramat (Raimondo) : 1326–1340
- Guy of San Germano (Guido di San Germano) : 1340–1341
- Richer II de Miremont (Richerio) : 1341–1343
- Stephen III Aldebrand (Stefano) : 1343–1345/1346
- William II de Rosières (Guglielmo) : 1345–1346–1353

In 1349, the abbey was destroyed by an earthquake.

- Francesco degli Atti : 1353–1355
- Angelo I Acciaioli : 1355–1357
- Angelo II della Posta : 1357–1362
- Angelo III Orsini : 1362–1365
- Guglielmo III : 1366–1369

From Bartolomeo on, the abbots are once again monks (not bishops).

- Bartolomeo da Siena : 1369–1369
- Andrea I da Faenza : 1369–1373
- Pietro IV de Tartaris : 1374–1395
- Enrico Tomacelli : 1396–1413

== 15th century ==
- Pirro Tomacelli : 1414–1442
- Antonio Carafa : 1446–1454

From Ludovico on, the abbots are in commendam.

- Ludovico Trevisan : 1454–1465
- Pietro V Barbo : 1465–1471
- Giovanni d'Aragona : 1471–1485
- Giovanni de' Medici : 1486–1504

== 16th century ==
From Zaccaria on, the abbots are heads of the Cassinese congregation.

- Zaccaria Castagnola : 1506–1509
- Graziano II : 1509–1510
- Ignazio Squarcialupi : 1510–1516
- Vincenzo de Riso : 1517–1518
- Teofilo Piacentini : 1519–1520
- Ignazio Squarcialupi : 1520–1521 (second time)
- Ludovico Trivulzio : 1522–1522
- Giustino Harbes : 1522–1523
- Ignazio Squarcialupi : 1524–1526 (third time)
- Crisostomo de Alessandro : 1527–1531
- Agostino Bonfili : 1531–1533
- Crisostomo de Alessandro : 1533–1538 (second time)
- Girolamo : 1538–1539
- Ignazio II : 1539–1541
- Girolamo II Scloccheto : 1541–1546
- Lorenzo Zambelli : 1546–1549
- Girolamo II Scloccheto : 1549–1551 (second time)
- Innocenzo Nicolai : 1551–1554
- Girolamo III Calcini : 1554–1555
- Isidoro Mantegazzi : 1555–1556
- Ignazio III Vicani : 1556–1559
- Angelo IV de Faggis : 1559–1564
- Ignazio III Vicani : 1564–1565 (second time)
- Angelo IV de Faggis : 1565–1568 (second time)
- Bernardo II de Adamo : 1568–1570
- Mattia Mattaleia : 1570–1572
- Angelo IV de Faggis : 1572–1575 (third time)
- Girolamo IV Gersale : 1575–1577
- Bernardo III Ferrajolo : 1577–1580
- Desiderio II : 1580–1585
- Bernardo III Ferrajolo : 1585–1587 (second time)
- Egidio II Sernicoli : 1587–1589
- Andrea II : 1589–1590
- Girolamo V Brugia : 1590–1595
- Basilio II : 1595–1596
- Vittorino de Manso : 1597–1598
- Zaccaria II Tarasco : 1598–1599
- Ambrogio Rastellini : 1599–1602

== 17th century ==
- Desiderio III : 1603–1604
- Gregorio Casamata : 1605–1608
- Paolo da Cosenza : 1608–1609
- Onorato Scalisi : 1609–1614
- Isidoro II Agresti : 1614–1617
- Paolo II Scotti : 1617–1621
- Bernardino Saivedra : 1621–1624
- Simplicio II Caffarelli : 1625–1628
- Paolo II Scotti : 1629–1630 (second time)
- Angelo V Grassi : 1631–1631
- Paolo Camillo Casati : 1632–1634
- Desiderio IV Petronio : 1635–1639
- Severino Fusco : 1640–1645
- Andrea III Arcioni : 1645 - 1647
- Desiderio IV Petronio : 1648–1649
- Domenico II Quesada : 1650–1653
- Carlo de Mauro : 1654–1657
- Angelo VI della Noce : 1657–1661
- Anastasio Perrone : 1661–1665
- Angelo VI della Noce : 1665–1669 (second time)
- Mauro Cesarini : 1669–1675
- Severino II Pepe : 1675–1680
- Andrea IV Deodati : 1680–1681
- Sebastiano Biancardi : 1681–1687
- Andrea IV Deodati : 1687–1692 (second time)
- Severino II Pepe : 1692–1697 (second time)
- Ippolito della Penna : 1697–1704

== 18th century ==
- Gregorio II Galisio : 1704–1717
- Nicola III Ruggi : 1717–1722
- Arcangelo Brancaccio : ?–1725
- Sebastiano II Gadaleta : 1725–1731
- Stefano IV de Stefano : 1731–1737
- Ildefonso del Verme : 1737–1739
- Sebastiano II Gadaleta : 1739–1745 (second time)
- Antonio II Capece : 1745–1751
- Giovanni Maria Ragosa : 1751–1753
- Marino II Migliarese : 1754–1760
- Domenico III Favilla : 1760–1766
- Aurelio Parisio : 1766–1772
- Rinaldo Santomagno : 1772–1778
- Domenico III Favilla : 1778–1780 (second time)
- Prospero de Rosa : 1781–1787
- Tommaso II Capomazza : 1788–1793
- Prospero de Rosa : 1793–1797 (second time)
- Marino III Lucarelli : 1797–1804

== 19th century ==
- Aurelio II Visconti : 1804–1816
- Giuseppe del Balzo : 1817–1821
- Luigi Bovio : 1821–1828
- Giacomo Diez : 1828–1834
- Celestino Gonzaga : 1834–1840
- Matteo Morso : 1840–1840
- Giuseppe II Frisari : 1841–1849
- Michelangelo Celesia : 1850–1858
- Simplicio III Pappalettere : 1858–1863
- Carlo II de Vera : 1863–1871
- Nicola IV d'Orgemont : 1872–1896
- Giuseppe III Quandel : 1896–1897
- Bonifacio Maria Krug : 1897–1909

== 20th century ==
- Gregorio IV Diamare : 1909–1945

In 1944, the abbey was destroyed a fourth time during the battle of Monte Cassino.

- Ildefonso II Rea : 1945–1971
- Martino Matronola : 1971–1983
- Bernardo IV Fabio D'Onorio : 1983–2007

== 21st century ==
- Pietro VI Vittorelli : 2007–2013
- Donato Ogliari : 2014–2023
- Antonio Luca Fallica : 2023–present
