= Gerard de Namur =

Gerard de Namur (died 1155) was a cardinal born in Namur in the modern-day Belgium. In older historiography he is wrongly identified as Gerardo Caccianemici, nephew of Pope Lucius II.

He studied at the abbey of Lobbes in Hainaut. Then he became canon of the cathedral chapter in Liège. He was elevated to the cardinalate by Eugenius III in 1152. He subscribed the papal bulls as cardinal-deacon of the Holy Roman Church between 1 March 1152 and 4 October 1152, and then as cardinal-deacon of S. Maria in Via Lata (31 December 1152 until 21 July 1155). He was legate in Germany in 1154 before Emperor Frederick I Barbarossa; his legation was not successful.

== Bibliography ==
- Johannes M. Brixius, Die Mitglieder des Kardinalkollegiums von 1130–1181, Berlin 1912, p. 53 no. 7
- Michael Horn, Studien zur Geschichte Papst Eugens III.(1145–1153), Peter Lang Verlag 1992
