= Antipope Paschal III =

Italian cardinal and diplomat, antipope from 1164 to 1168

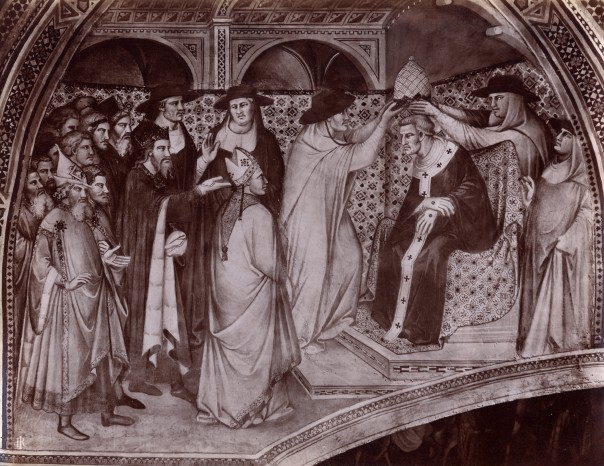
- Election of Antipope Paschal III, fresco by Spinello Aretino
- Papacy began: 22 April [O.S. 15 April] 1164
- Papacy ended: 20 September [O.S. 13 September] 1168
- Predecessor: Roman claimant: Alexander III; Antipapal claimant: Victor IV
- Successor: Roman claimant: Alexander III; Antipapal claimant: Callixtus III
- Opposed to: Alexander III
- Other post: Cardinal of St. Maria

Personal details
- Born: Guido of Crema c. 1110 Crema, Lombardy
- Died: 20 September [O.S. 13 September] 1168 Rome

Antipope Paschal III (Latin: Paschalis III; c. 1110 – 20 September 1168) was a 12th-century clergyman who, from 1164 to 1168, was the second antipope to challenge the reign of Pope Alexander III. He had previously served as Cardinal of St. Maria.

== Biography ==
Born Guido of Crema; he was a nephew of Cardinal John of Crema. In 1159, he joined the obedience of antipope Victor IV, and organized synods in England and France in favour of him. Pope Alexander III interdicted him. In 1164, Victor IV died. A small number of cardinals, who had been obedient to Victor IV, met again in Lucca to elect a successor. Guido was elected, took the name Paschal III, and was consecrated by Henry II of Leez, Bishop of Liège. The new schismatic pope was established at Viterbo, and successfully prevented pope Alexander from reaching Rome. However, he was soon driven from Rome, leading to the return of Alexander III in 1165. (Note: Comyn, Robert (1851). History of the Western Empire, from its Restoration by Charlemagne to the Accession of Charles V. Vol. 1. ISBN 978-1-340-96019-3. OCLC 10525161. OL 23500392M – via Internet Archive.)

In order to gain more support from Emperor Frederick Barbarossa, Paschal canonized Charlemagne in a magnificent celebration at Aachen in 1165. Paschal soon lost the support of Burgundy, but the emperor crushed opposition in Germany and gained the cooperation of Henry II of England.

Concerned over rumours that Alexander III was about to enter into an alliance with the Byzantine Emperor Manuel I, in October 1166, Frederick embarked on his fourth Italian campaign, hoping as well to secure the claim of Paschal III and the imperial coronation of his wife, Beatrice. In 1167, Frederick began besieging Ancona, which had acknowledged the authority of Manuel I. Meanwhile, his forces achieved a great victory over the Romans at the Battle of Monte Porzio. Heartened by this victory, Frederick lifted the siege of Ancona and hurried to Rome. Supported by Frederick's imperial army, Paschal was enthroned at St Peter's on 22 July 1167, and Alexander III became a fugitive. On the following 30 July, Frederick received a second coronation from Paschal III. Two days later, Paschal crowned Beatrice empress. Frederick's campaign was halted by the sudden outbreak of an epidemic (malaria or the plague), which threatened to destroy the Imperial army and drove the emperor back to Germany. (Note: See entry for the contemporary chroniclers, Ottone and Acerbo Morena.) Without the support of the Emperor, Paschal was able to hold only the quarter on the right bank of the Tiber, where he died of cancer 20 September 1168. He was succeeded as Antipope by Callixtus III.

The Catholic Church has never recognized Charlemagne's canonization as Paschal was an antipope. In 1179, the Third Council of the Lateran annulled all of his ordinances, including the canonization. Charlemagne remained in good regard still, however, among Catholics, and Prosper Guéranger even composed a prayer to Charlemagne. He is a Blessed of the Church. Also annulled was the coronation of Empress Beatrice, who ceased to be referred as empress.

== See also ==
- Papal selection before 1059
- Papal conclave (since 1274)
