= Pope Eugene III =

Head of the Catholic Church from 1145 to 1153

Pope Blessed Eugene III
- Bishop of Rome
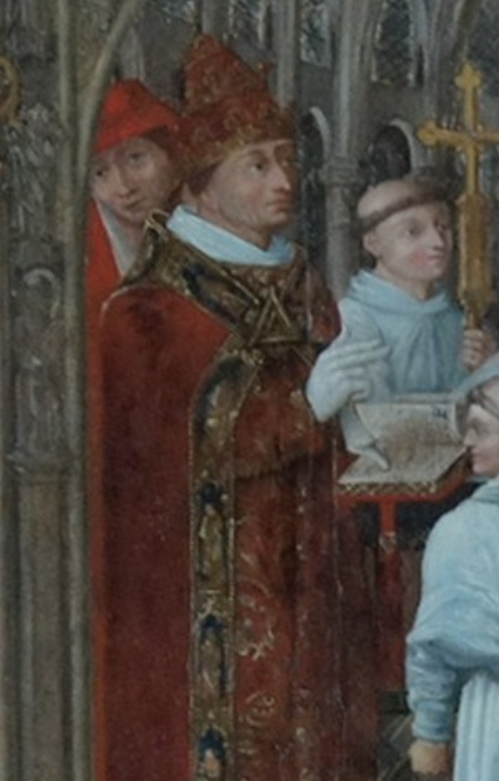
- Miniature of Eugene III
- Church: Catholic Church
- Papacy began: 15 February 1145
- Papacy ended: 8 July 1153
- Predecessor: Lucius II
- Successor: Anastasius IV
- Previous post: Abbot of San Anastasio alle Tre Fontane (1140–45)

Orders
- Ordination: 1135 by Innocent II
- Consecration: 18 December 1145

Personal details
- Born: Bernardo; 1080 Pisa, Republic of Pisa, Holy Roman Empire
- Died: 8 July 1153 (aged 72–73) Tivoli, Papal States, Holy Roman Empire
- Coat of arms

Sainthood
- Feast day: 8 July
- Venerated in: Catholic Church
- Beatified: 28 December 1872; Rome, Papal States by Pius IX
- Attributes: Papal vestments; Papal tiara
- Patronage: Tre Fontane Abbey; Cistercians

Pope Eugene III (Latin: Eugenius III; c. 1080 – 8 July 1153), born Bernardo, called Bernardo da Pisa, was head of the Catholic Church and ruler of the Papal States from 15 February 1145 to his death in 1153. He was the first Cistercian to become pope. In response to the fall of Edessa to the Muslims in 1144, Eugene proclaimed the Second Crusade. He was beatified in 1872 by Pope Pius IX.

== Early life ==
Bernardo was born in the vicinity of Pisa. Little is known about his origins and family except that he was son of a certain Godius. From the 16th century he is commonly identified as member of the family of Paganelli di Montemagno, which belonged to the Pisan aristocracy, but this has not been proven and contradicts earlier testimonies that suggest he was a man of rather humble origins. In 1106 he was a canon of the cathedral chapter in Pisa and from 1115 is attested as subdeacon. 1133–1138 he acted as vicedominus of the archdiocese of Pisa.

Between May 1134 and February 1137 he was ordained to the priesthood by Pope Innocent II, who resided at that time in Pisa. Under the influence of Bernard of Clairvaux he entered the Cistercian Order in the monastery of Clairvaux in 1138. A year later he returned to Italy as leader of the Cistercian community in Scandriglia. In Autumn 1140, Innocent II named him abbot of the monastery of S. Anastasio alle Tre Fontane outside Rome. Some chronicles indicate that he was also elevated to the College of Cardinals, but these testimonies probably resulted from a confusion because Bernardo is not attested as cardinal in any document and from the letter of Bernard of Clairvaux addressed to the cardinals shortly after his election it clearly appears that he was not a cardinal.

== Papal election ==
Bernardo was elected pope on 15 February 1145, the same day as the death of his predecessor Lucius II. Lucius had unwisely decided to take the offensive against the Roman Senate and was killed by a "heavy stone" thrown at him during an attack on the Capitol. Bernardo took the pontifical name Eugene III. He was "a simple character, gentle and retiring - not at all, men thought, the material of which Popes are made". He owed his elevation partly to the fact that no one was eager to accept an office the duties of which were at the time so difficult and dangerous and because the election was "held on safe Frangipani territory".

Bernardo's election was assisted by his being a pupil and friend of Bernard of Clairvaux, the most influential ecclesiastic of the Western Church and a strong promoter of the temporal authority of the popes. The choice did not have the approval of Bernard, however, who remonstrated against the election, writing to the entire Curia:

"May God forgive you what you have done! ... What reason or counsel, when the Supreme Pontiff was dead, made you rush upon a mere rustic, lay hands on him in his refuge, wrest from his hands the axe, pick or hoe, and raise him to a throne?"

Bernard was equally forthright in his views directly to Eugene, writing:

"Thus does the finger of God raise up the poor out of the dust and lift up the beggar from the dunghill that he may sit with princes and inherit the throne of glory."

Despite these criticisms, Eugene seems to have borne no resentment against Bernard and his initial reaction, once the choice had been made, it has been claimed that Bernard took advantage of the very qualities in Eugene III that he had criticised so as virtually to rule in the pope's name.

For their part, the cardinals resented Bernard's influence over the pope, stating "You should know that, having been elevated to the rule of entire church by us, around whom, like pivots [cardines] the axis of the church universal swings, and having been made by us from a private person into the father of the universal church, it is necessary from now on that you belong not just to yourself but to us; that you do not rank particular and recent friendships before those which are general and of ancient standing".

Bernard reacted strongly to the cardinals' assertions, writing to Pope Eugenius that the cardinals had "no power except that which you grant them or permit them to exercise" and that their claims "make no sense... [are] derived from no tradition... [and] had the support of authority".

The issue remained unresolved for the whole of Eugenius' pontificate.

== Pontificate ==
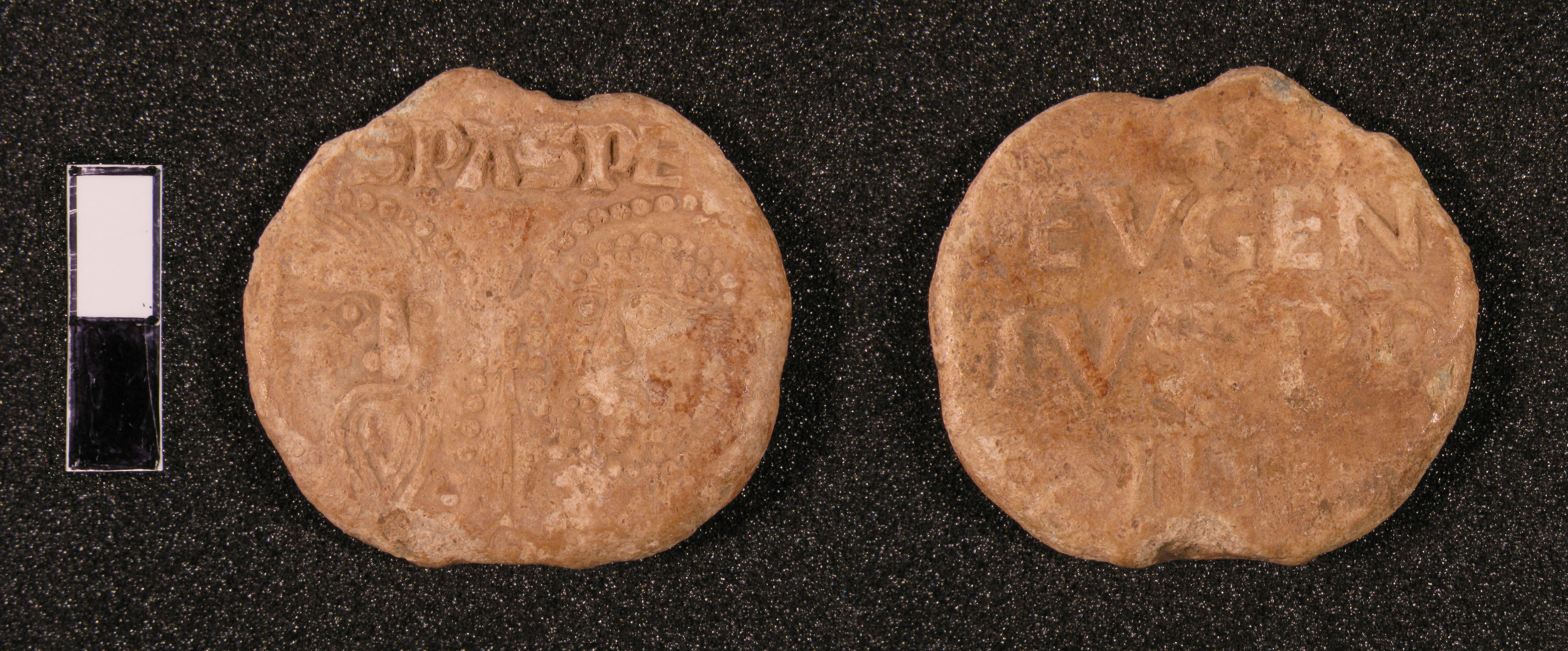
A bulla of Eugene III

During nearly the whole of his pontificate, Eugene III was unable to reside in Rome. Hardly had he left the city to be consecrated in the Farfa Abbey (about 40 km north of Rome), when the citizens, under the influence of Arnold of Brescia, the great opponent of the Pope's temporal power, established the old Roman constitution, the Commune of Rome and elected Giordano Pierleoni to be patrician. Eugene III appealed for help to Tivoli, Italy, to other cities at feud with Rome, and to King Roger II of Sicily (who sent his general Robert of Selby), and with their aid was successful in making such conditions with the Roman citizens as enabled him for a time to hold the semblance of authority in his capital. But as he would not agree to a treacherous compact against Tivoli, he was compelled to leave the city in March 1146. He stayed for some time at Viterbo, and then at Siena, but went ultimately to France.

On hearing of the fall of Edessa (now the modern day city of Urfa, the first of the Crusader states established in the Levant) to the Turks, which occurred in 1144, he had, in December 1145, addressed the bull Quantum praedecessores to Louis VII of France, calling on him to take part in another crusade. Earlier the same year, Eugenius issued the Militia Dei, allowing the Templar Order to charge tithes and fees for burials. At a great diet held at Speyer in 1146, King Conrad III of Germany and many of his nobles were also incited to dedicate themselves to the crusade by the eloquence of Bernard of Clairvaux, preached to an enormous crowd at Vézelay. The Second Crusade turned out to be "an ignominious fiasco" and, after travelling for a year, the army abandoned their campaign after just five days of siege "having regained not one inch of Muslim territory." The crusaders suffered immense losses in both men and materiel and suffered, in the view of one modern historian, "the ultimate humiliation which neither they, nor their enemies, would forget".

On 11 April 1147, Eugene III issued a papal bull known as the Divina dispensatione. As part of the bull, Eugene fulfilled and validated a promise made by Bernard of Clairvaux that the same indulgences would be offered to those who crusaded against the Wends in Mecklenburg as those who went to fight in the Middle East. According to Bernard of Clairvaux, the goal of the crusade was to battle the pagan Slavs "until such a time as, by God's help, they shall either be converted or deleted".

Eugene III held synods in northern Europe at Paris, Rheims (March 1148), and Trier in 1147 that were devoted to the reform of clerical life. He also considered and approved the works of Hildegard of Bingen.

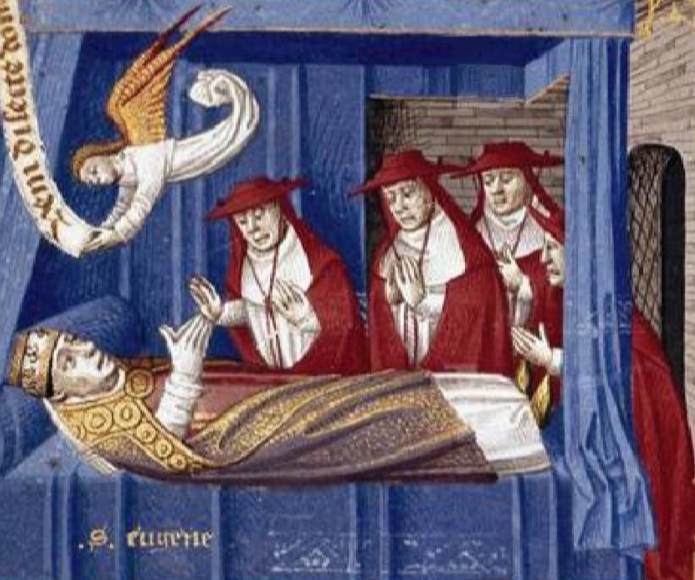
15th century miniature of the death of Eugene III from Le Miroir historial de Vincent de Beauvais

In June 1148, Eugene III returned to Italy and took up his residence at Viterbo. He was unable to return to Rome due to the popularity of Arnold of Brescia, who opposed papal temporal authority, in the city. He established himself at Ptolemy II's fortress in Tusculum, the closest town to Rome at which he could safely install himself, on 8 April 1149. There he met the returning Crusader couple Louis VII of France and Eleanor of Aquitaine, who were by then barely on speaking terms given the strains of the failed Crusade and the rumors of Eleanor's incestuous adultery during the Crusade. Eugene, "a gentle, kind-hearted man who hated to see people unhappy" attempted to assuage the pain of the failed Crusade and their failing marriage by insisting that they slept in the same bed and "by daily converse to restore the love between them". His efforts were unsuccessful, and two years later Eugene agreed to annul the marriage on the grounds of consanguinity.

Eugene stayed at Tusculum until 7 November. At the end of November 1149, through the aid of the king of Sicily, he was again able to enter Rome, but the atmosphere of open hostility from the Commune soon compelled him to retire (June 1150). Emperor Frederick I Barbarossa promised to aid Eugene against his subjects who had revolted but the support never came. Eugene III died at Tivoli on 8 July 1153. Though the citizens of Rome resented Eugene III's effort to assert his temporal authority, they recognized him as their spiritual lord. Until the day of his death he continued to wear the coarse habit of a Cistercian monk under his robe. He was buried in the Vatican with every mark of respect.

== Veneration ==
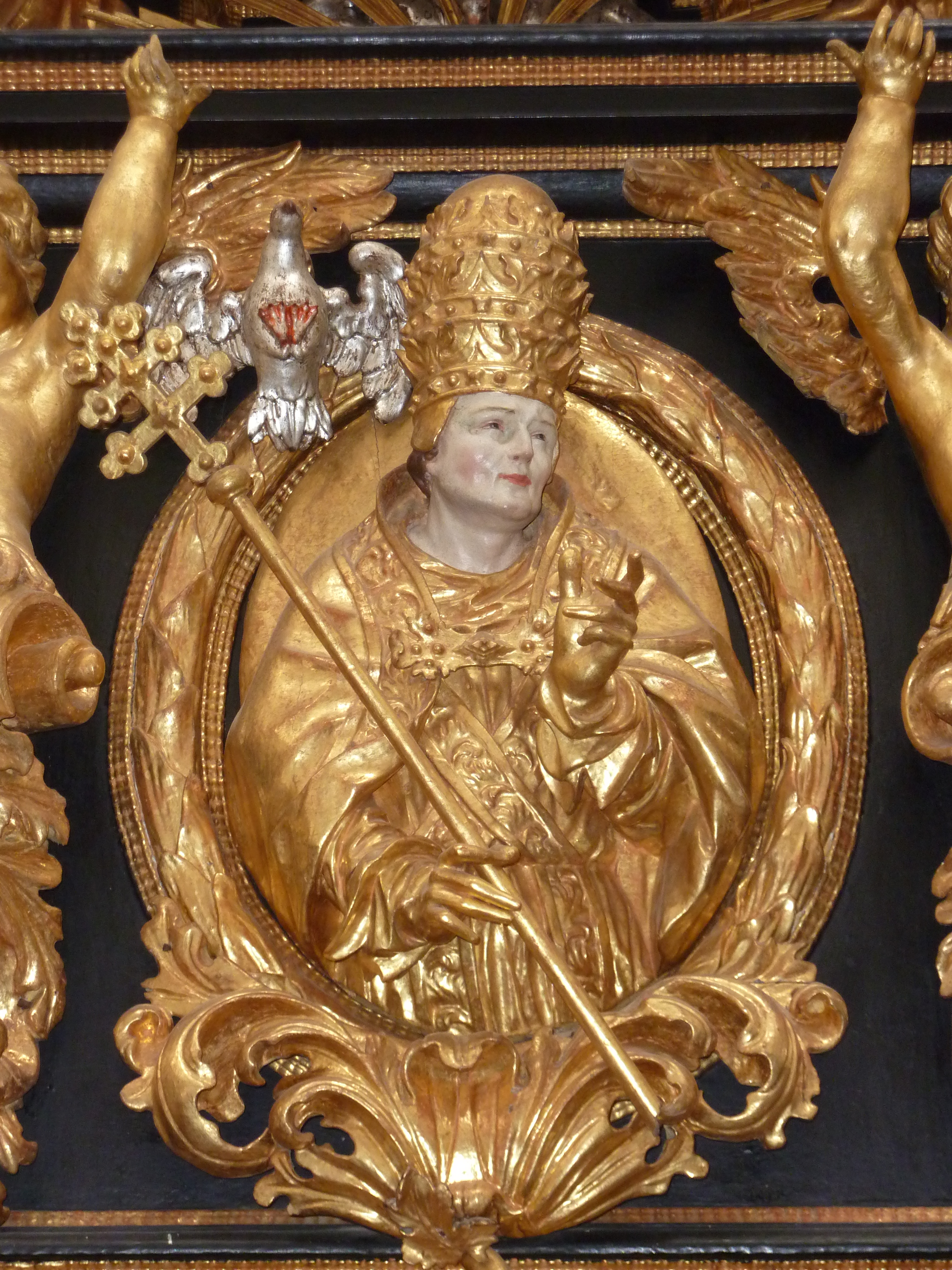
Relief of Pope Eugene III at the pulpit of the former Cistercian Baumgartenberg Abbey

The people of Rome were quick to recognize Eugene III as a pious figure who was meek and spiritual. His tomb acquired considerable fame owing to the miracle purported to have occurred there and his cause for sainthood commenced. Pope Pius IX beatified him in 1872.

== See also ==
- Cardinals created by Eugene III
- Knights Templar

Catholic Church titles
Preceded by Lucius II	Pope; 1145–53	Succeeded by Anastasius IV
