= Antipope Victor IV (1159–1164) =

Italian cardinal (1095–1164)

Count of Terni
- Reign: 6 May 1159 – 20 April 1164
- Co-counts: Otto of Monticelli; Godfrey of Monticelli; Solomon of Monticelli
- Installed: 7 September 1159
- Term ended: 20 April 1164
- Predecessor: Adrian IV
- Successor: Antipapal claimant: Paschal III
- Opposed to: Alexander III
- Other post: Cardinal of St. Cecilia

Personal details
- Born: Octavian of Monticelli (Italian: Ottaviano dei Crescenzi Ottaviani di Monticelli) c. 1105 Monticelli, Papal States
- Died: 20 April 1164 (aged c. 59) Lucca, Republic of Lucca
- House: Ottaviani
- Father: John of Monticelli

Victor IV (1105 – 20 April 1164), born Octavian of Monticelli (Italian: Ottaviano dei Crescenzi Ottaviani di Monticelli), was elected as a Ghibelline antipope in 1159, following the death of Pope Adrian IV and the election of Alexander III. His election was supported by Emperor Frederick Barbarossa, who had previously granted him the city of Terni. He took the name Victor IV, not acknowledging Antipope Victor IV of 1138, whose holding of the papal office was deemed illegitimate.

== Early life and career ==
Octavian was born around 1105 in Monticelli (modern Guidonia Montecelio), near Tivoli. (Note: "Si ignora la data di nascita di Ottaviano..."/"The date of Octavian's birth is unknown..") He was the son of John, Count of Monticelli and Prefect of Rome. He was a member of the House of Ottaviani, a branch of the Crescentii that descended from the Theopylacti. Both families played a prominent role in Roman politics and ecclesiastical affairs between the 10th and 12th centuries, with several of their members attaining or influencing the papacy.

Octavian was appointed as rector of Benevento in May 1137, and cardinal priest of San Nicola in Carcere in 1138. In 1151, Octavian became cardinal priest of Santa Cecilia. He was described by John of Salisbury as eloquent and refined, but petty and parsimonious. When he was sent with Cardinal Jordan of Santa Susanna as a papal legate to summon Conrad III of Germany to Italy to be crowned Holy Roman Emperor, he quarrelled with his co-legate and, in John of Salisbury's words, "made the Church a laughingstock". In Germany, he met Frederick, duke of Swabia, who would soon become the new Emperor Frederick Barbarossa; the cardinal was present at the imperial election.

On 6 May 1159, Frederick granted the city and County of Terni jointly to Octavian and his brothers, Otto, Godfrey and Solomon. A document from 1185 identifies Otto as a kinsman of Frederick I, implying that Octavian was also related to the emperor.

== Reign as pope ==
=== Election ===
Following the death of Pope Adrian IV, the College of Cardinals gathered to elect a new pope. During the Papal election of 4–7 September 1159 they elected the chancellor Rolando, who assumed the title of Alexander III. However, five cardinals, the clergy of St. Peter's, and the Roman populace refused to recognize him and elected their own candidate Octavian on 7 September 1159. He was very popular on account of his liberality, accessibility, and splendour of living. He was considered a great friend of the Germans and rested his hopes on the Emperor Frederick Barbarossa. Yet it is not to be assumed that the emperor, busy with the Siege of Crema, had desired his election; Rolando was certainly not agreeable to him, yet neither was it to his interest to have an antipope.

=== Consecration ===
Victor IV was consecrated on 4 October in the abbey of Farfa by Cardinal-Bishop Imar of Tusculum, dean of the Sacred College of Cardinals, assisted by Ubaldo, bishop of Ferentino and Riccardo, bishop of Melfi. With the armed assistance of Otto von Wittelsbach and his own armed groups in relatively short time he took control over the City of Rome and the Patrimony of St. Peter, while Alexander III took refuge in the territory of the Kingdom of Sicily, and later in France.

=== Synods ===
Both popes sent their legates to the Catholic kingdoms in order to secure their recognition. Frederick was at first neutral, but with clerical advice convoked a synod at Pavia in February 1160, which was attended by about fifty archbishops and bishops. The emperor, after the sacking of Crema the previous month, summoned both popes to Pavia. Alexander III declined, arguing that the pope should be subjected only to the judgment of God. Frederick then declared himself in favour of Victor IV, and the synod decided, as was to be expected, for Victor, and pronounced an anathema upon Alexander. On February 11, 1160, the council ended with a procession to Pavia Cathedral. Here Victor was received by the emperor, who, as a sign of humility, helped him to get off the horse and took him by the hand and led him to the altar and kissed his feet. Most of the episcopate of the Empire followed the decision of the synod. However, this attempt to secure Victor's recognition was never completely successful in Germany, since Bishop Eberhard of Salzburg was his principal opponent. In response, Alexander on his side excommunicated both Frederick I and Victor IV.

From 1159 to 1162, Victor participated in four councils; Pavia (February 1160), Lodi (June 1161), St.-Jean-de-Losne (September 1162), and Trier (November 1162). All were convened under the auspices to condemn Alexander III and his supporters.

=== Recognition ===
King Valdemar I of Denmark also gave his support to Victor IV, but the primate of Denmark archbishop Eskil of Lund became a partisan of Alexander III. It seems that Poland also supported Victor IV. Alexander was nevertheless able to gain the support of the rest of western Europe, because since the days of Hildebrand the power of the pope over the church in the various countries had increased so greatly that the kings of France and of England could not view with indifference a revival of such imperial control of the papacy as had been exercised by the Emperor Henry III. Therefore, France, England, Castile, Sweden, Norway, Scotland, Hungary, Sicily, and the Crusader states in Outremer recognized Alexander III as true pope, even if in some of these countries there were significant Victorine minorities in episcopates or among feudal rulers. The papal schism in Europe was now a fact.

In 1162, King Louis VII of France wavered once more. Frederick then attempted to convoke a joint council at Saint-Jean-de-Losne with Louis VII to decide the issue of who should be the pope. Louis neared the meeting site, but when he became aware that Frederick had stacked the votes for Victor, Louis decided not to attend the council. As a result, the issue was not resolved at that time. This disastrous meeting had as its result that the king held firmly to the obedience of Alexander. During the years 1162–1165 Alexander lived in France, and from 1163, the pope exerted himself to gain more of Germany for his cause.

== Death ==
All uncertainty came to an end on 20 April 1164. That day, while travelling with Rainald of Dassel, Victor IV died at Lucca. When Pope Alexander III learned of the death of his rival, he wept, and reprimanded his cardinals when they showed inappropriate delight. The clergy of the Lucca Cathedral and San Frediano would not allow Victor IV buried there because of his excommunication. Therefore, he was buried in a local monastery. When miracles were reported at his tomb, it was destroyed by order of Pope Gregory VIII in December 1187. Victor's successor was Paschal III.

Following Victor's death the inhabitants of Terni resisted his brothers' authority and, with the support of Alexander III, eventually drove them from the city. In retaliation, the city was sacked by Frederick Barbarossa's general, Archbishop Christian of Mainz.

== See also ==
- Papal selection before 1059
- Papal conclave (since 1274)

== Sources ==
- Barlow, F. (1936). "The English, Norman and French Councils called to deal with Papal Schism in 1159," English Historical Review 51 (1936), pp. 242–268.
- Bolton, Brenda, Duggan, Anne (2003). Adrian IV, the English Pope, 1154–1159: Studies and Texts. Ashgate Publishing, Ltd. ISBN 978-0-7546-0708-3.
- Collins, Roger (2009). Keepers Of The Keys Of Heaven: A History Of The Papacy. Basic Books.
- Dahmus, J. (1969). The Middle Ages, A Popular History. Garden City, NY: Doubleday.
- Duggan, Anne J. (2016). "Master of the Decretals: A Reassessment of Alexander III's Contribution to Canon Law". In Duggan, Anne J.; Clarke, Peter D. (eds.). Pope Alexander III (1159–81): The Art of Survival. Routledge.
- Huscroft, Richard (2023). Power and Faith: Politics and Religion in Western Europe. Routledge.
- Jaffé, Philipp (1851). "Regesta pontificum Romanorum ab condita Ecclesia ad annum post Christum natum MCXCVIII". Pan Biblioteka Kórnicka (in Latin). Berlin: Veit et al.
- Laudage, Christiane (2012). Kampf um den Stuhl Petri. Die Geschichte der Gegenpäpste. Freiburg: Herder.
- Löffler, Klemens, in: Herbermann, Charles, ed. (1912). "Victor IV" . Catholic Encyclopedia. Vol. 15. New York: Robert Appleton Company.
- Madden, Thomas F. (2016). "Alexander III and Venice". In Duggan, Anne J.; Clarke, Peter D. (eds.). Pope Alexander III (1159–81): The Art of Survival. Routledge. pp. 315–340.
- Meyer, Moritz (1871). Die Wahl Alexander III und Victor IV (1159): Ein Beitrag zur Geschichte der Kirchenspaltung unter Kaiser Friedrich I (Göttingen 1871) (in German).
- Munz, Peter (1969). Frederick Barbarossa: a Study in Medieval Politics. Ithaca and London: Cornell University Press.
- Norwich, John Julius (1970). The Kingdom in the Sun 1130–1194. London: Longmans. ISBN 978-0582127357.
- Piazza, Andrea (2020). "Vittore IV, antipapa". Dizionario Biografico degli Italiani (in Italian). Vol. 99. Istituto della Enciclopedia Italiana.
- Reardon, Wendy J. 2004. The Deaths of the Popes. Macfarland & Company, Inc. ISBN 0-7864-1527-4
- Robinson, Ian Stuart (1990). The Papacy 1073–1198. Continuity and Innovation. Cambridge Medieval Textbooks. Cambridge University Press. ISBN 978-0-521-31922-5.
- Somerville, Robert (1977). Pope Alexander III and the Council of Tours (1163): A Study of Ecclesiastical Politics and Institutions in the Twelfth Century. University of California Press.
- Suger (2018). Selected Works of Abbot Suger of Saint Denis. Translated by Cusimano, Richard; Whitmore, Eric. The Catholic University of America Press.
- Ullmann, Walter (2003). A Short History of the Papacy in the Middle Ages (2nd ed.). Routledge.
- Berardozzi, Antonio (2013). I Prefetti. Una dinastia signorile tar impero e papato (secoli XII-XV). Rome: Società romana di storia patria. ISBN 978-88-97808-39-8.
- Pompeo, De Angelis (2022). Storia di Terni, prima parte - Dalla preistoria alla formazione del comune medioevale. Intermedia Edizioni. ISBN 9791280764560.
- Manassei, Paolano (1875). "Alcuni documenti per la storia delle città di Terni e Spoleto". Archivio Storico Italiano. 3. 22 (90). Casa Editrice Leo S. Olschki.
- Romeo, Carlo (1984a). "Crescenzio (di Benedetto)". Dizionario Biografico degli Italiani (in Italian). Vol. 30: Cosattini–Crispolto. Rome: Institute of the Italian Encyclopaedia. ISBN 978-88-12-00032-6.
- Romeo, Carlo (1984b). "Crescenzio de Theodora". Dizionario Biografico degli Italiani (in Italian). Vol. 30: Cosattini–Crispolto. Rome: Institute of the Italian Encyclopaedia. ISBN 978-88-12-00032-6.
