= Papal coronation =

Former Roman Catholic Church ceremony

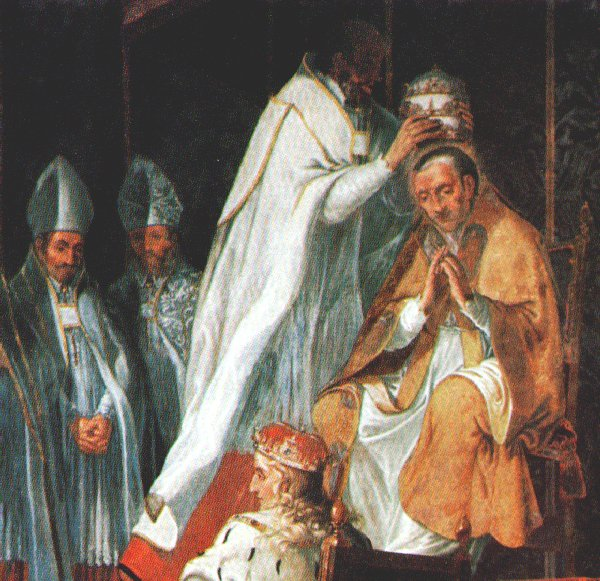
Coronation of Celestine V, the only pope to be crowned twice

A papal coronation was the formal ceremony of the placing of the papal tiara on a newly elected pope. The first recorded papal coronation was of Pope Nicholas I in 858. The most recent was the 1963 coronation of Paul VI, who soon afterwards abandoned the practice of wearing the tiara. To date, none of his successors have used the tiara, and their papal inauguration celebrations have included no coronation ceremony, although any future pope may elect to restore the use of the tiara at any point during his pontificate.

The papal inauguration celebration, with or without a coronation, has only symbolic significance, as a pope assumes office immediately upon accepting his election during the conclave.

In Spanish, the term La Coronación Pontificia (English: "Pontifical Coronation") is sometimes used for the canonical coronation of religious images through a formal, expressed Pontifical decree by a reigning pope.

== Ritual ==
=== On the day of election ===
When a conclave elects a new pope, he assumes all of the rights and authority of the papacy immediately upon his acceptance of election; however, popes traditionally numbered their regnal years from the date of their coronation. If a newly elected pope is not a bishop, he is consecrated at once. In accordance with tradition, the right of consecration belongs to the dean of the College of Cardinals, in his absence to the subdean, and in the absence of both of these to the senior cardinal bishop. If the new pope is already a bishop, as is normally the case, his election is announced immediately to the people gathered in Saint Peter's Square and he gives them his blessing.

In the 11th and 12th centuries, the immantatio, or bestowal of the mantum (a papal vestment consisting of a very long red cope fastened with an elaborate morse) on the newly elected pope was regarded as especially symbolic of investiture with papal authority, and was conferred with the words: "I invest thee with the Roman papacy, that thou rule over the city and the world." This "mantling" with a red cope was first mentioned as an existing custom in 1061, in a letter from Peter Damian to Antipope Cadalus. The garment was associated with the Roman Imperial insignia and the Donation of Constantine. The Archdeacon or Prior of Deacons performed the ceremony immediately after the election, as noted in the 1073 accession of Pope Gregory VII and ordines from 1189 and 1192.

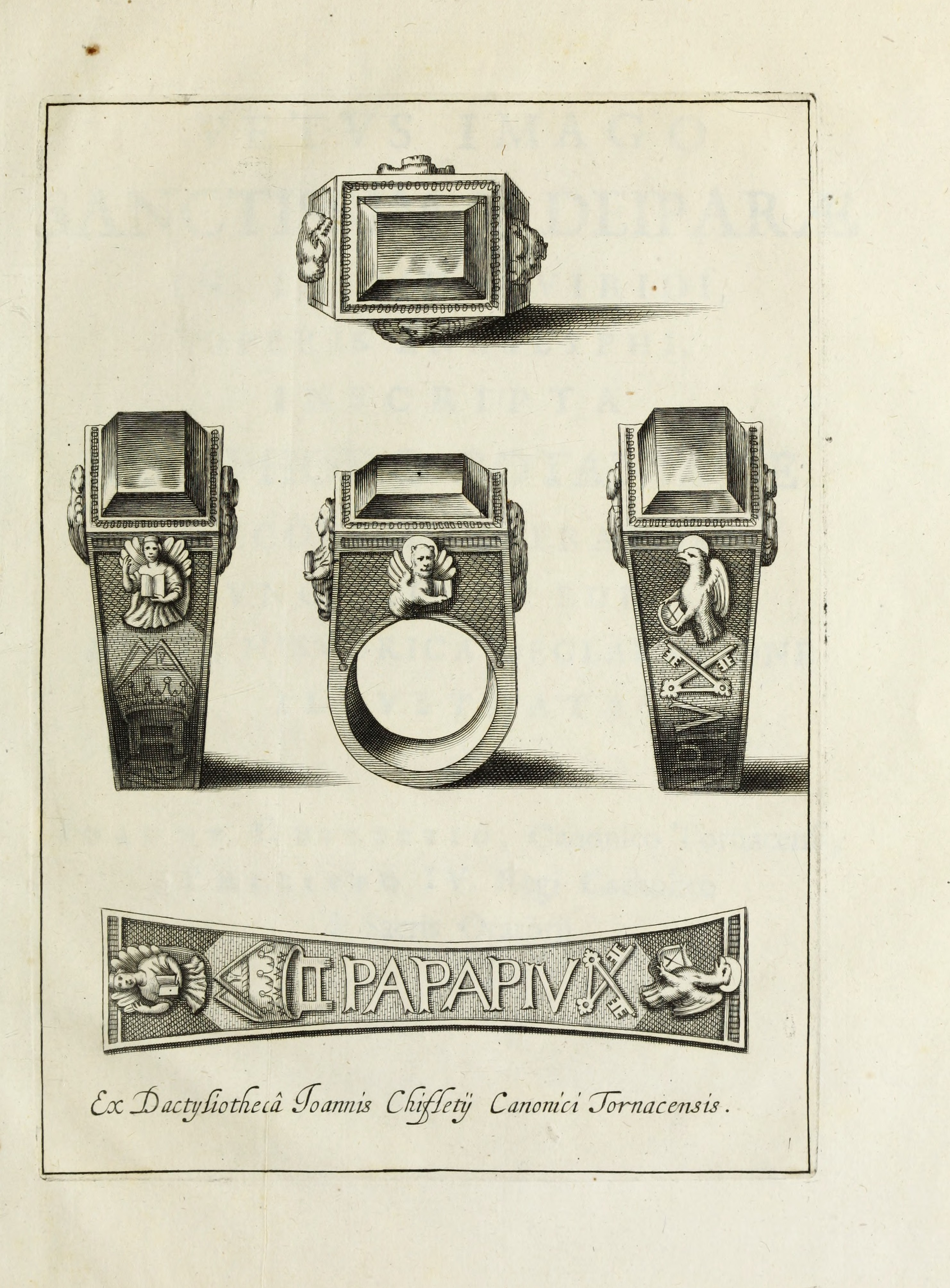
Illustration of the Ring of the Fisherman belonging to Pope Pius II

Historically, the Cardinal Camerlengo placed the Ring of the Fisherman on the finger of the new Pope immediately after his election, while requesting for the name that the new pope wished to take. After replying, the pope then removed the ring and handed it to the Master of Ceremonies to be engraved with his name. The ring, first mentioned as a long-standing custom in 1265, is therefore the Papal Ring of Investiture.

=== Coronation Mass ===
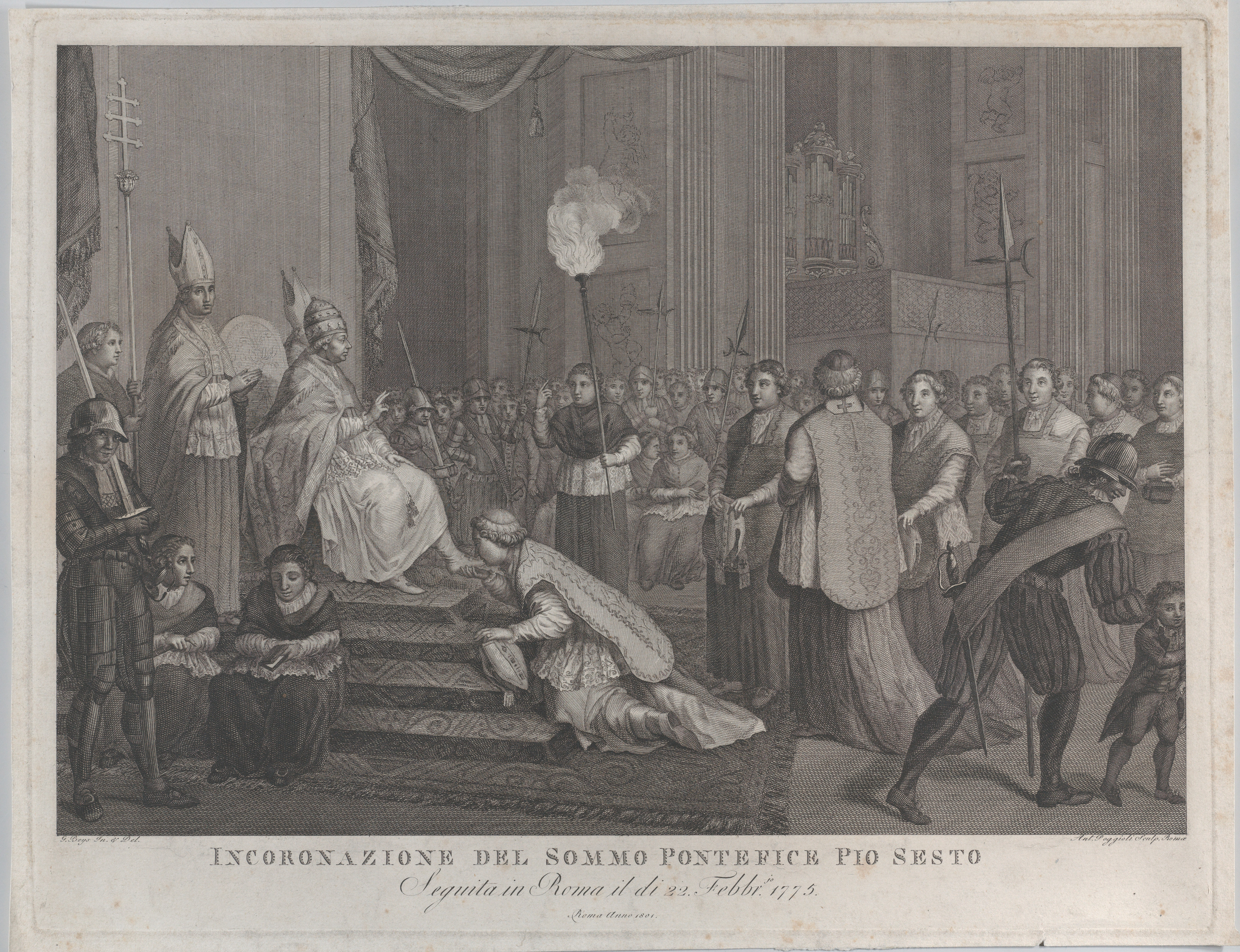
1801 depiction of the obeisance of the cardinals

The coronation took place on the first Sunday or Holy Day following the election. It began with a solemn Papal Mass. During the chanting of Terce, he sat on a throne and all of the cardinals made what was called their "first obeisance" to him, approaching one by one and kissing his hand. Then the archbishops and bishops approached and kissed his feet.

Following this, at least from the beginning of the 16th century, the newly elected pope was carried in state through St. Peter's Basilica on the sedia gestatoria under a white canopy, with the papal flabella (ceremonial fans) to either side. Instead of the papal tiara, he wore a jewelled mitre (the episcopal mitra pretiosa). Three times, the procession was stopped, and a bundle of flax lashed to a gilded staff was burnt before the newly elected pontiff, while a master of ceremonies said: Pater Sancte, sic transit gloria mundi (Holy Father, thus passes the glory of the world) as a symbolic reminder to set aside materialism and vanity. Once at the high altar, he would begin to celebrate Solemn High Mass with full papal ceremonial.

After the Confiteor, the pope was seated on the sedia gestatoria, which was resting on the ground, and the three senior cardinal bishops approached him wearing mitres. Each in turn placed his hands above him and said the prayer, Super electum Pontificem (over the elected pope). First the Cardinal Bishop of Albano said:

God, who are present without distinction whenever the devout mind invokes you, be present, we ask you, we and this your servant, __, who to the summit of the apostolic community has been chosen as the judge of your people, infuse with the highest blessings that he experience your gift who has reached this point.

Then the Cardinal Bishop of Porto said:

We supplicate you, Almighty God, effect your customary devotion and pour out on this your servant, __, the grace of the Holy Spirit that he who is constituted at the head of our church as the servant of the mystery, you would strengthen with the fullness of virtue.

Finally the Cardinal Bishop of Ostia said:

God, who willed your Apostle Peter to hold first place in the inner fellowship of the apostles, that universal Christianity overcome evil, look propitiously we ask on this your servant, __, who from a humble position has suddenly been enthroned with the apostles on this same principal sublimity, that just as he has been raised to this exalted dignity, so may he likewise merit to accumulate virtue; in bearing the burden of the universal church, help him, make him worthy and for thee who are blessed may merits replace vices.

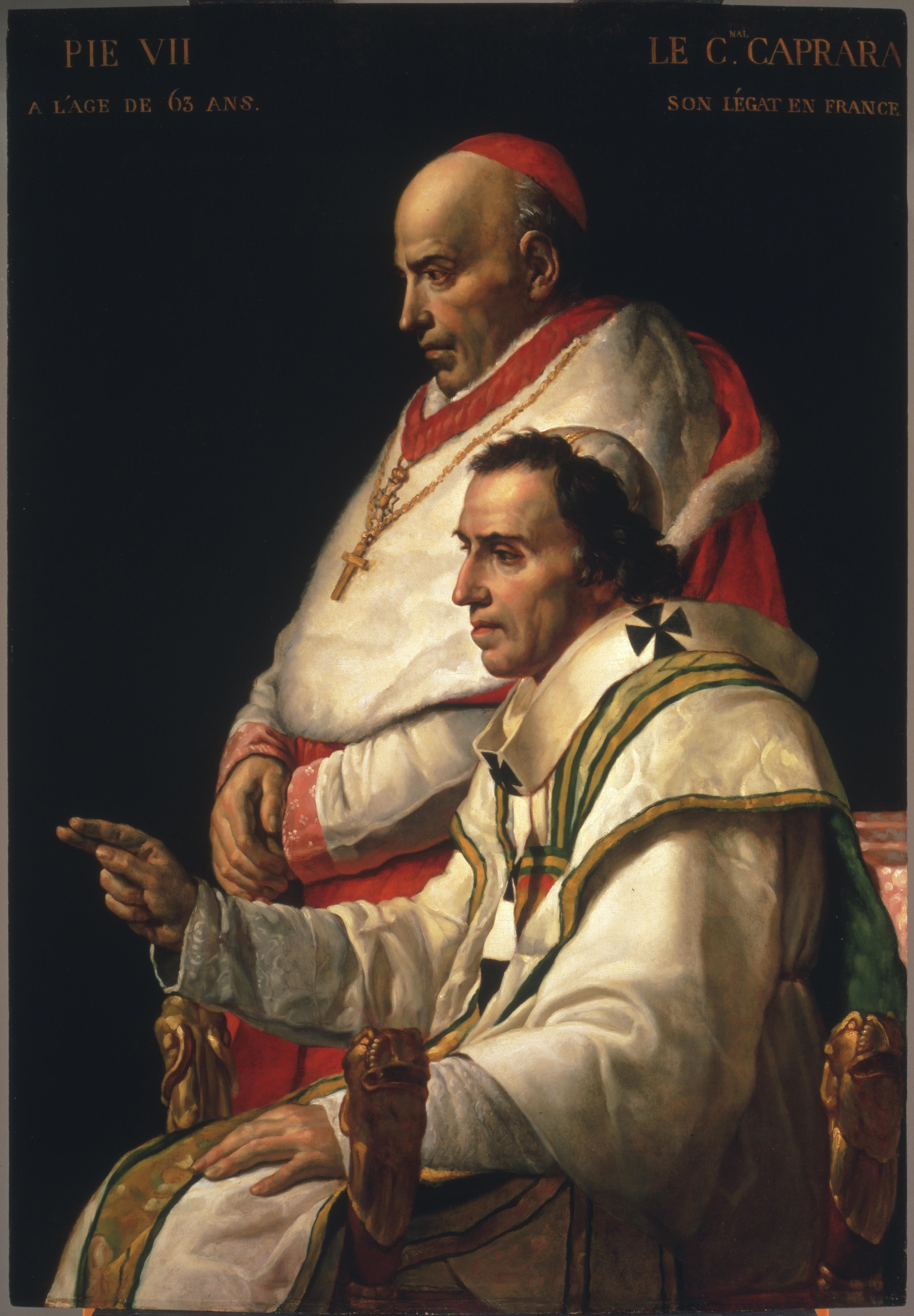
1805 depiction of Pope Pius VII wearing the pallium

Then, the senior cardinal deacon placed the pallium on his shoulders saying:

Accept the pallium, representing the plenitude of the Pontifical office, to the honour of Almighty God, and the most glorious Virgin Mary, his Mother, and the Blessed Apostles Peter and Paul, and the Holy Roman Church.

After the investiture with the pallium, the pope incensed the high altar and then went to the throne, placed on the choir side, between the Altar of the Confession and the Altar of the Chair, and there, during the singing of the Kyrie, he received again the obeisance of the cardinals, archbishops and bishops. Then the Mass continued. After the Gloria in excelsis and the Pax vobis, the pope said the Collect for the day and then secretly a prayer for himself. After the pope had returned again to his seat the litany asking the Saints to pray for the Pope were chanted:

Cantors:	Response:
Hear, O Christ	Life to our lord, __, decreed by God as Supreme Pontiff and Universal Father
Hear, O Christ	Life to our lord, __, decreed by God as Supreme Pontiff and Universal Father
Hear, O Christ	Life to our lord, __, decreed by God as Supreme Pontiff and Universal Father
Savior of the world	Grant him aid.
Savior of the world	Grant him aid.
Savior of the world	Grant him aid.
Saint Mary	Grant him aid.
Saint Mary	Grant him aid.
Saint Michael	Grant him aid.
Saint Gabriel	Grant him aid.
Saint Raphael	Grant him aid.
Saint John the Baptist	Grant him aid.
Saint Joseph	Grant him aid.
Saint Peter	Grant him aid.
Saint Paul	Grant him aid.
Saint Andrew	Grant him aid.
Saint James, (the greater)	Grant him aid.
Saint Stephen	Grant him aid.
Saint Leo (the great)	Grant him aid.
Saint Gregory (the great)	Grant him aid.
Etc.	etc.
Christe, eléison	Christe, eléison
Kýrie, eléison	Kýrie, eléison

As with all Papal High Masses, the Epistle and the Gospel were read in both Greek and Latin and the pope communicated at his throne.

=== Coronation ===
Photograph showing the moment of the coronation of Pope Benedict XV in the Sistine Chapel, 1914 The Humeston New Era (Iowa newspaper)

After the Mass, the new pope was crowned with the papal tiara. This frequently took place on the balcony of St. Peter's Basilica, overlooking the crowds gathered in St. Peter's Square. The pope was seated on a throne with the flabella to either side of him. After the Dean of the College of Cardinals recited a few prayers, including the Lord's Prayer and a collect, the senior cardinal deacon, the protodeacon, removed the pope's mitre and placed the tiara on his head with the words:

Accipe tiaram tribus coronis ornatam, et scias te esse patrem principum et regum, rectorem orbis in terra vicarium Salvatoris nostri Jesu Christi, cui est honor et gloria in saecula saeculorum.
Receive the tiara adorned with three crowns, and know that you are the father of princes and kings, the ruler of the world, the vicar of our Savior Jesus Christ on earth, to whom be all honor and glory, world without end.

Following his coronation, the pope imparted the solemn papal blessing Urbi et Orbi. Following 1929, the new pope would have received a salute by a guard of honour of the Italian Armed Forces and the Swiss Guards together with the Noble Guard, as military bands play the Pontifical Anthem and Il Canto degli Italiani (until 1946 the Marcia Reale and S'hymnu sardu nationale).

=== Taking possession of the cathedral of Rome ===
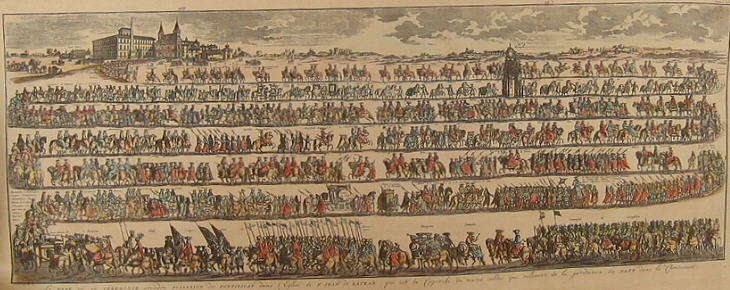
Procession for the possessio of Pope Benedict XIII

The last act of the inauguration of a new pope was and still is the formal taking possession (possessio) of his cathedra as Bishop of Rome in the Archbasilica of St. John Lateran. This is the final ceremony mentioned in Pope John Paul II's apostolic constitution on the vacancy of the Apostolic See and the election of the Roman pontiff. The Lateran Basilica remains the cathedral of Rome, and the enthronement occurs there.

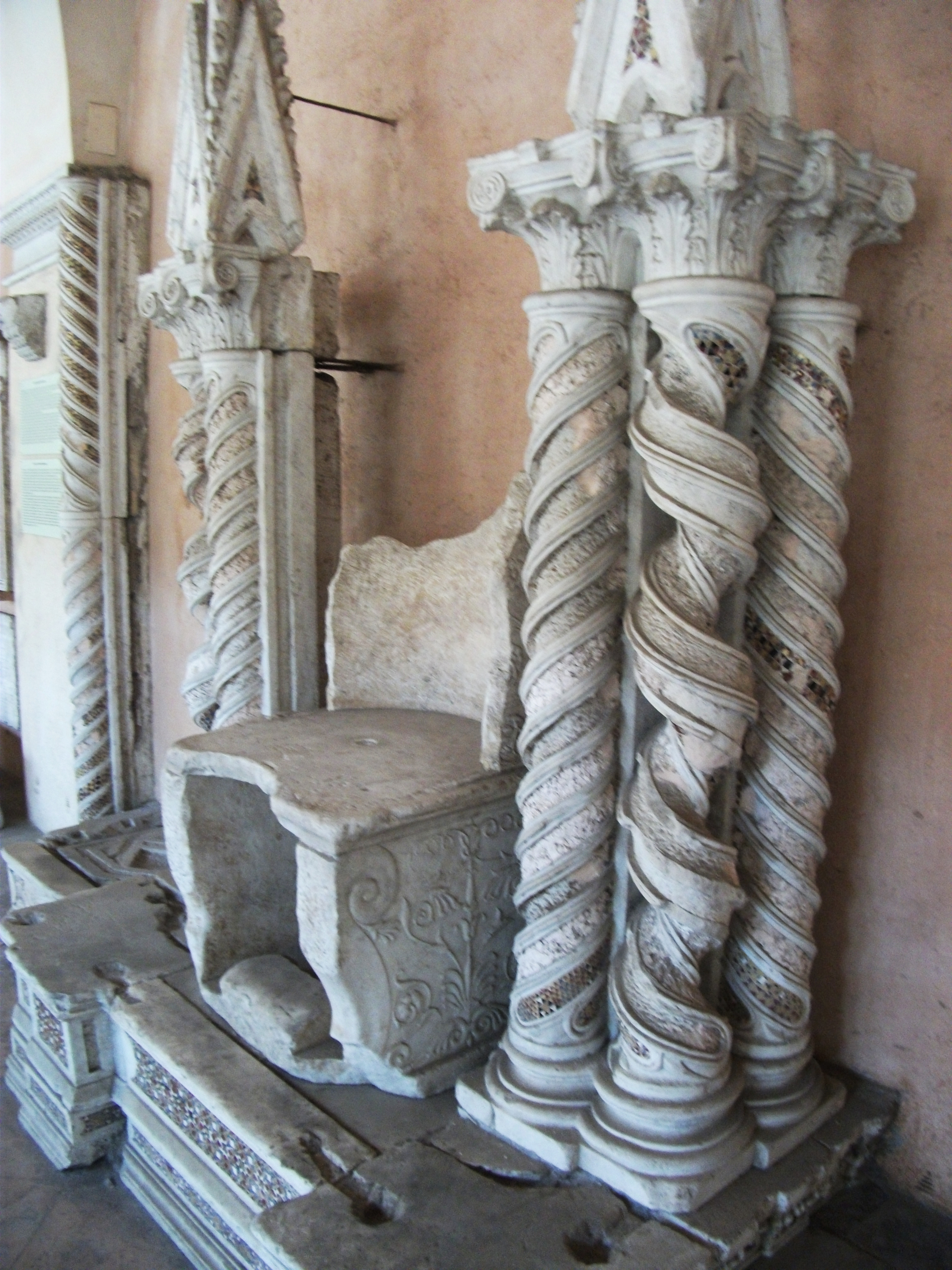
Stone seat formerly used during the Enthronement ceremonies

From the 11th century, excluding the Avignon Papacy, there existed a ceremony of taking possession of the Lateran which had special significance in the Church. The Vita of Paschal II (elected 1099) and the Vita of Honorius II (elected 1124), and other ceremonial books from the 12th century, describes how the pope, after his election and having been bestowed with the Papal mantum, rode to the Lateran Basilica. He was first conducted to a stone seat known as the "dunged seat" (stercorata, a symbol of humility referencing being raised "from the ash heap" as in 1 Samuel 2:8) placed at the entrance of the basilica, where he threw gold and silver coins to the people saying "this gold and silver are not given me for my own pleasure; what I have, I will give to you." The pope was then led to the throne in the apse of the church, where he received the cardinals at his feet and the kiss of peace. The pope proceeded to the Lateran Palace where he reclined on two red marble chairs placed together, representing Saints Peter and Paul and imitating Byzantine imperial custom. The pope was handed the papal ferula, the keys to the Lateran Basilica and Palace (representing also the power of binding and loosing in Matthew 18:18), and girded with a red cincture attached with a purple pouch containing musk (symbolising the "aroma of Christ" in 2 Corinthians 2:15-16) and seven or twelve seals, representing the Seven gifts of the Holy Spirit or the twelve apostles. He then returned the ferula and received the officials of the Palace. Standing up, he again scattered silver coins to the people, saying "he scatters abroad, he gives to the poor, his righteousness endures for ever (2 Corinthians 9:9)." After a stampede during Pope Pius IV's enthronement, Pope Pius V changed the ceremony, assembling the poor at Campo Santo and handed each 3 giuli instead of tossing coins. Gregory XIII and Sixtus V replaced the ceremony with donations to charity institutions. During the Avignon Papacy, the Lateran chairs were left behind in Rome and unused; much of this ceremony was later abandoned entirely from Pope Leo X onward.

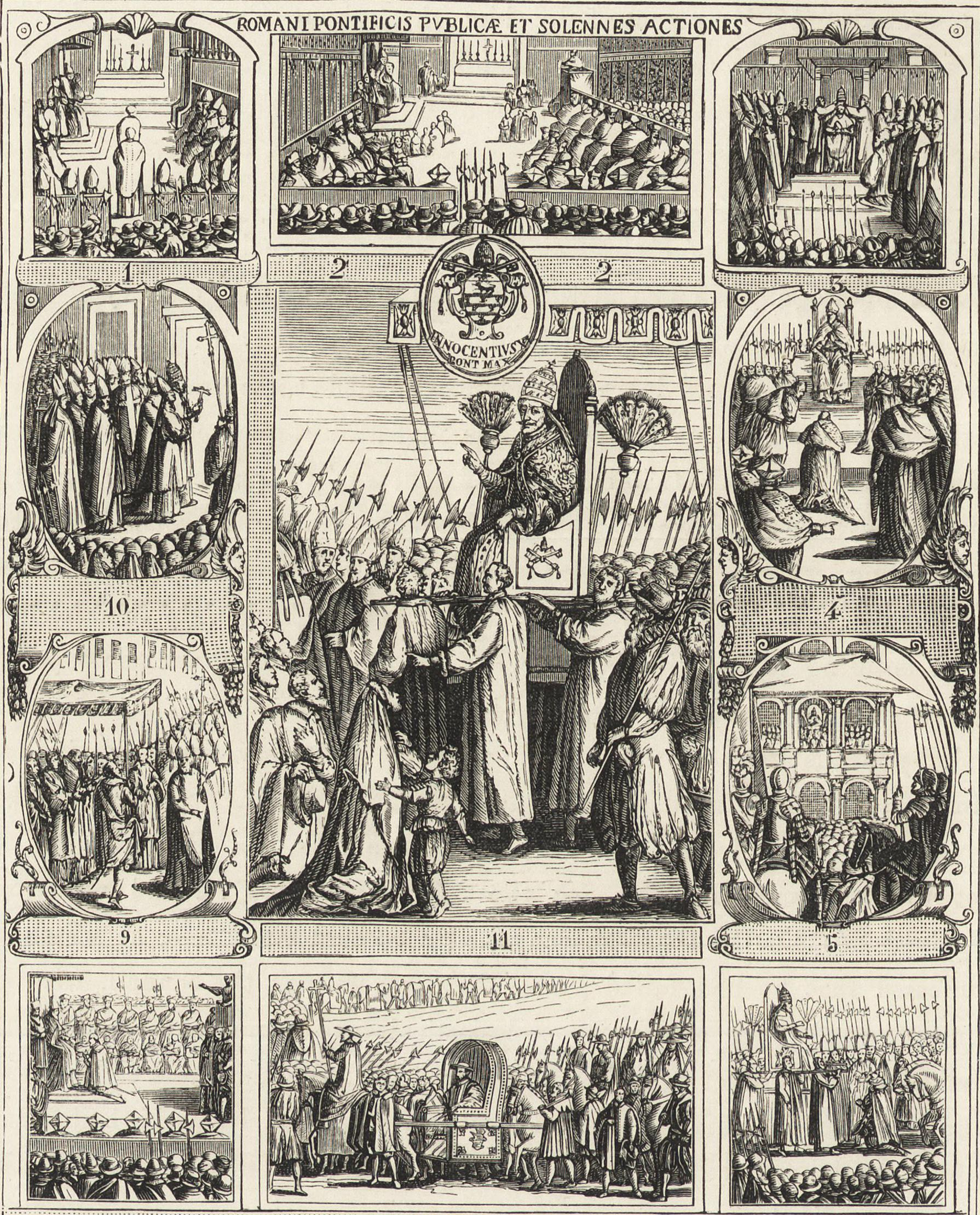
Illustration of Papal ceremonies: —3. Coronation of the Sovereign-Pontiff at St. John of Lateran.—4. The newly-elected Pope seated upon the altar of the Clementine Chapel and receiving the homage of the cardinals.—5. Solemn benediction which the Pope gives to the people.—7.Solemn cavalcade of the Pope upon his first journey from St. Peters to the Lateran Church.

From Leo X's enthronement, the splendour of the procession to the Lateran itself became the focus of the ceremony rather than specific actions. The later enthronement focused on a horseback procession from the Vatican to the Lateran, preceded by the Blessed Sacrament on a white horse and under a baldachin, and light cavalry who cleared the way. The papal court, including the pope's domestic servants as well as barons and princes, rode with the pope. The pope, carrying the Golden Rose, proceeded on a white horse, whose bridle was held by a prince or barons, while the pope's cross was carried before him. Popes unable to ride were carried in a litter. Upon approaching the Lateran, the canons presented the pope with the two gold and silver keys to the basilica presented on a gilt bowl covered with flowers. He then ascended a throne at the entrance of the church, received the obeisance of the canons, and then was carried to the altar where he prayed and gave his blessing to the people. The pope again gave his blessing outside the church before changing to his ordinary dress and retiring. The procession was retained in its original splendour as late as Pope Pius IX's enthronement in 1846, who used a carriage instead of a white horse. During the "prisoner in the Vatican" period that followed, the enthronement in the Lateran did not take place.

The enthronement of the Pope was originally a requisite before the newly-elected pope took part in the governance of the church; until Pope Nicholas II, popes were forbidden to govern until the enthronement had been completed. In 1059, Nicholas II declared that the enthronement was not necessary for the pope to assume administration of the church.

== Location of the ceremony ==
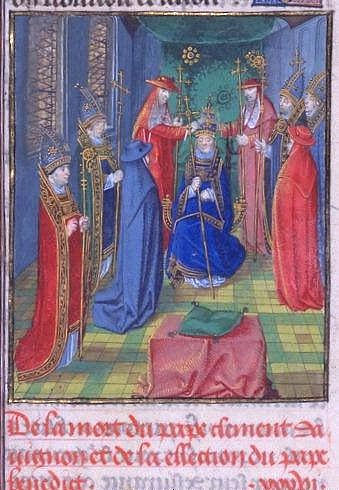
Consecration of Antipope Benedict XIII at Avignon, 28 September 1394

The earliest papal coronations took place in St. John Lateran, the pope's cathedral. However, for hundreds of years papal coronations have traditionally taken place in the environs of St. Peter's Basilica, though a number of coronations took place in Avignon, during the Avignon papacy. Earlier, Pope Celestine V was twice crowned in L'Aquila. In 1800 Pope Pius VII was crowned in the crowded church of the Benedictine island monastery of San Giorgio, Venice, after his late predecessor, Pope Pius VI, had been forced into temporary exile during Napoleon Bonaparte's capture of Rome. Since the French seized the tiara along with the previous pope, he was crowned with a papier-mâché tiara, for which the ladies of Venice gave up their jewels.

All coronations after 1800 took place in Rome. Leo XIII was crowned in the Sistine Chapel, due to fears that anti-clerical mobs, inspired by Italian unification, might attack the Basilica and disrupt the ceremony. Benedict XV was also crowned in the chapel in 1914. Pius XI was crowned at the dais in front of the High Altar in St. Peter's Basilica. Popes Pius IX, Pius XII, and John XXIII all were crowned in public on the balcony of the basilica, facing crowds assembled below in St. Peter's Square. Paul VI was crowned in front of St Peter's on a special dais with the entire coronation ceremony outdoors, as St Peter's was filled with special seating for the Vatican Council sessions.

Pius XII's 1939 coronation broke new ground by being the first to be filmed and the first to be broadcast live on radio. The ceremony, which lasted for six hours, was attended by leading dignitaries; these included the heir to the Italian throne, the Prince of Piedmont, former kings Ferdinand I of Bulgaria and Alfonso XIII of Spain, the 16th Duke of Norfolk (representing King George VI of the United Kingdom), and the Irish Taoiseach, Éamon de Valera, the last two being in evening dress (white tie and tails).

== Paul VI and the coronation ==
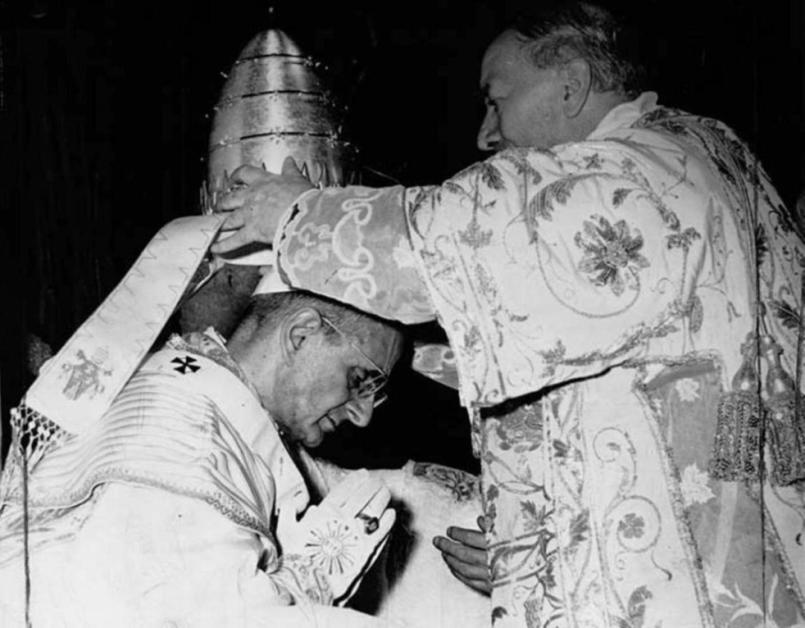
Pope Paul VI is crowned by Cardinal Alfredo Ottaviani, 30 June 1963

The last pope to be crowned was Pope Paul VI. He decided to cease wearing a papal tiara and laid his own on the altar of St. Peter's Basilica in a gesture of humility. His 1975 apostolic constitution, Romano Pontifici Eligendo prescribed that "the new pontiff is to be crowned by the senior cardinal deacon".

His successor, Pope John Paul I, opted not to be crowned and to have instead a less elaborate "solemn Mass to mark the start of his ministry as Supreme Pastor" in September 1978.

== John Paul II and the coronation ==
After John Paul I's sudden death following a thirty-three-day reign, the new pope, John Paul II, opted to copy his predecessor's ceremony without coronation. In his homily at his inauguration Mass, he said that Paul VI had "left his successors free to decide" whether to wear the papal tiara. He went on:

Pope John Paul I, whose memory is so vivid in our hearts, did not wish to have the tiara; nor does his Successor wish it today. This is not the time to return to a ceremony and an object considered, wrongly, to be a symbol of the temporal power of the Popes.

John Paul II's 1996 apostolic constitution, Universi Dominici gregis, now in force, does not specify the form that the "solemn ceremony of the inauguration of the pontificate" of a new pope should take, whether with or without a coronation.

A number of papal tiaras are available for a future pope to use.

== List of papal coronations ==
Date	Location	Pope	Cardinal	Deaconry	Notes
3 October 1143	Rome	Celestine II	Gregorio Tarquini	SS. Sergio e Bacco	On 26 September, he was consecrated bishop of Rome by Cardinal Alberic de Beauvais, bishop of Ostia.
12 March 1144	Rome	Lucius II	Gregorio Tarquini	SS. Sergio e Bacco	On that same day, he was consecrated bishop of Rome by Cardinal Alberic de Beauvais, bishop of Ostia.
14 March 1145	Abbey of Farfa	Eugene III	Odone Bonecase	S. Giorgio in Velabro	On 18 February, he was consecrated bishop of Rome by Cardinal Corrado della Suburra, bishop of Sabina and dean of the Sacred College of Cardinals.
12 July 1153	Rome	Anastasius IV	Odone Bonecase	S. Giorgio in Velabro	
5 December 1154	Rome	Adrian IV	Probably by Rodolfo	S. Lucia in Septisolio	Odone Fattiboni was absent (see 1154 papal election)
20 September 1159	Nympha	Alexander III	Odone Bonecase	S. Giorgio in Velabro	On that same day, he was consecrated bishop of Rome by Cardinal Ubaldo Allucingoli, bishop of Ostia e Velletri.
4 October 1159	Abbey of Farfa	Antipope Victor IV	Icmar, bishop of Tusculum and dean of the Sacred College of Cardinals		
22 July 1167	Rome	Antipope Paschal III			On 22 April 1164, he was consecrated bishop of Rome at Lucca by Henry II of Leez, prince-bishop of Liège (not a cardinal).
1168	Rome	Antipope Callixtus III	(?)		
6 September 1181	Velletri	Lucius III	Teodino de Arrone, bishop of Porto e Santa Rufina.		
1 December 1185	Verona	Urban III	(?) (probably by Ardicio Rivoltella)	S. Teodoro	
25 October 1187	Ferrara	Gregory VIII	Giacinto Bobone Orsini	S. Maria in Cosmedin	On that same day, he was consecrated bishop of Rome, probably by Cardinal Thibaud, bishop of Ostia e Velletri (?).
7 January 1188	Pisa	Clement VIII	Giacinto Bobone Orsini	S. Maria in Cosmedin	
14 April 1191	Rome	Celestine III	Graziano da Pisa	SS. Cosma e Damiano	On that same day, he was consecrated bishop of Rome by Cardinal Ottaviano di Paoli, bishop of Ostia e Velletri and sub-dean of the Sacred College of Cardinals
22 February 1198	Rome	Innocent III	Graziano da Pisa	SS. Cosma e Damiano	On that same day, he was consecrated bishop of Rome by Cardinal Ottaviano di Paoli, bishop of Ostia e Velletri and sub-dean of the Sacred College of Cardinals
31 August 1216	Rome	Honorius III	Guido Pierleone	S. Nicola in Carcere Tulliano	On 24 July, he was consecrated bishop of Rome by Cardinal Ugolino Conti di Segni, bishop of Ostia e Velletri.
11 April 1227	Rome	Gregory IX	Ottaviano dei Conti di Segni	SS. Sergio e Bacco	
28 June 1243	Anagni	Innocent IV	Rainiero Capocci	S. Maria in Cosmedin	On that same day, he was consecrated bishop of Rome, probably by Cardinal Rinaldo Conti di Segni, bishop of Ostia e Velletri and dean of the Sacred College of Cardinals (?).
20 December 1254	Naples	Alexander IV	Riccardo Annibaldeschi	S. Angelo in Pescheria	
4 September 1261	Viterbo	Urban IV	Riccardo Annibaldeschi	S. Angelo in Pescheria	
20 September 1265	Viterbo	Clement IV	Riccardo Annibaldeschi	S. Angelo in Pescheria	
23 March 1272	Rome	Gregory X	Giovanni Gaetano Orsini	S. Nicola in Carcere Tulliano	On 19 March, he was consecrated bishop of Rome by (?) (possibly by Cardinal Odo of Châteauroux, bishop of Frascati and dean of the Sacred College of Cardinals).
22 February 1276	Rome	Innocent V	Giovanni Gaetano Orsini	S. Nicola in Carcere Tulliano	
20 September 1276	Viterbo	John XXI	Giovanni Gaetano Orsini	S. Nicola in Carcere Tulliano	
26 December 1277	Rome	Nicholas III	Giacomo Savelli	S. Maria in Cosmedin	On 19 December, he was consecrated bishop of Rome by (?) (possibly by Cardinal Bertrand de Saint-Martin, bishop of Sabina and dean of the Sacred College of Cardinals).
23 March 1281	Orvieto	Martin IV	Giacomo Savelli	S. Maria in Cosmedin	On that same day, he was consecrated bishop of Rome by Cardinal Latino Malabranca Orsini, bishop of Ostia e Velletri.
19 May 1285	Rome	Honorius IV	Goffredo da Alatri	S. Giorgio in Velabro	On that same day, he was consecrated bishop of Rome by Cardinal Latino Malabranca Orsini, bishop of Ostia e Velletri.
22 February 1288	Rome	Nicholas IV	Matteo Rosso Orsini	S. Maria in Portico	
29 August 1294	Aquila	Celestine V	Probably by Matteo Rosso Orsini	S. Maria in Portico	On that same day, he was consecrated bishop of Rome probably by Cardinal Hugh Aycelin, bishop of Ostia e Velletri. He was crowned again a few days later (the only instance of a double papal coronation).
23 January 1295	Rome	Boniface VIII	Matteo Rosso Orsini	S. Maria in Portico	On that same day, he was consecrated bishop of Rome by Cardinal Hugh Aycelin, bishop of Ostia e Velletri.
27 October 1303	Rome	Benedict XI	Matteo Rosso Orsini	S. Maria in Portico	
14 November 1305	Lyon	Clement V	Napoleone Orsini	S. Adriano	
5 September 1316	Lyon	John XXII	Napoleone Orsini	S. Adriano	
15 May 1328	Rome	Antipope Nicholas V	Giacomo Alberti	Pseudocardinal-Bishop of Ostia e Velletri	On 12 May, he was consecrated bishop of Rome also by Giacomo Alberti, at that time bishop of Castello.
8 January 1335	Avignon	Benedict XII	Napoleone Orsini	S. Adriano	
19 May 1342	Avignon	Clement VI	Guillaume des Farges	S. Maria Nuova	
30 December 1352	Avignon	Innocent VI	Gaillard de la Mothe	S. Lucia in Septisolio	
6 November 1362	Avignon	Urban V	Probably by Guillaume de la Jugié	S. Maria in Cosmedin	On that same day, he was consecrated bishop of Rome by Cardinal Andouin Aubert, bishop of Ostia e Velletri.
3 January 1371	Avignon	Gregory XI	Rinaldo Orsini	S. Adriano	On that same day, he was consecrated bishop of Rome by Cardinal Guy de Boulogne, bishop of Porto e Santa Rufina and dean of the Sacred College of Cardinals.
18 April 1378	Rome	Urban VI	Giacomo Orsini	S. Giorgio in Velabro	
31 October 1378	Fondi	Antipope Clement VII	Count Onorato I Caetani (not a cardinal)		
9 November 1389	Rome	Boniface IX	Tommaso Orsini	S. Maria in Domnica	On that same day, he was consecrated bishop of Rome by Cardinal Francesco Moricotti Prignano, bishop of Palestrina and dean of the Sacred College of Cardinals.
11 October 1394	Avignon	Antipope Benedict XIII	Hugues de Saint-Martial	S. Maria in Portico	On that same day, he was consecrated bishop of Rome by Cardinal Jean de Neufchâtel, bishop of Ostia e Velletri.
11 November 1404	Rome	Innocent VII	Rinaldo Brancaccio	SS. Vito e Modesto	
19 December 1406	Rome	Gregory XII	Probably by Rinaldo Brancaccio	SS. Vito e Modesto	
7 July 1409	Pisa	Antipope Alexander V	Amedeo Saluzzo	S. Maria Nuova	
25 May 1410	Bologna	Antipope John XXIII	Rinaldo Brancaccio	SS. Vito e Modesto	On that same day, he was consecrated bishop of Rome by Cardinal Jean Allarmet de Brogny, bishop of Ostia e Velletri and sub-dean of the Sacred College of Cardinals.
21 November 1417	Constance	Martin V	Amedeo Saluzzo	S. Maria Nuova	On 14 November, he was consecrated bishop of Rome by Cardinal Jean Allarmet de Brogny, bishop of Ostia e Velletri and dean of the Sacred College of Cardinals.
19 May 1426	Peñíscola	Antipope Clement VIII	crowned by (?)		
11 March 1431	Rome	Eugene IV	Alfonso Carillo de Albornoz	S. Eustachio	
24 June 1440	Basel	Antipope Felix V	Louis Aleman	S. Cecilia	
19 March 1447	Rome	Nicholas V	Prospero Colonna	S. Giorgio in Velabro	
20 April 1455	Rome	Callixtus III	Prospero Colonna	S. Giorgio in Velabro	
3 September 1458	Rome	Pius II	Prospero Colonna	S. Giorgio in Velabro	
16 September 1464	Rome	Paul II	Niccolò Fortiguerra	S. Cecilia	
25 August 1471	Rome	Sixtus IV	Roderic de Borja	S. Nicola in Carcere Tulliano	On that same day, he was consecrated bishop of Rome by Cardinal Guillaume d'Estouteville, bishop of Ostia e Velletri and sub-dean of the Sacred College of Cardinals.
12 September 1484	Rome	Innocent VIII	Francesco Todeschini-Piccolomini	S. Eustachio	
26 August 1492	Rome	Alexander VI	Francesco Todeschini-Piccolomini	S. Eustachio	
8 October 1503	Rome	Pius III	Raffaele Riario	S. Giorgio in Velabro	On 1 October, he was consecrated bishop of Rome by Cardinal Giuliano della Rovere, bishop of Ostia e Velletri and sub-dean of the Sacred College of Cardinals.
26 November 1503	Rome	Julius II	Raffaele Riario	S. Giorgio in Velabro	
19 March 1513	Rome	Leo X	Alessandro Farnese	S. Eustachio	On 17 March, he was consecrated bishop of Rome by Cardinal Raffaele Riario, bishop of Ostia e Velletri and dean of the Sacred College of Cardinals.
31 August 1522	Rome	Adrian VI	Marco Cornaro	S. Maria in Via Lata	
26 November 1523	Rome	Clement VII	Marco Cornaro	S. Maria in Via Lata	
3 November 1534	Rome	Paul III	Innocenzo Cybo	S. Maria in Domnica	
22 February 1550	Rome	Julius III	Innocenzo Cybo	S. Maria in Domnica	
10 April 1555	Rome	Marcellus II	Jean du Bellay, bishop of Porto e Santa Rufina		On that same day, he was consecrated bishop of Rome by Cardinal Gian Pietro Carafa, bishop of Ostia e Velletri and dean of the Sacred College of Cardinals.
26 May 1555	Rome	Paul IV	Francesco Pisani	S. Marco	
6 January 1560	Rome	Pius IV	Alessandro Farnese	S. Lorenzo in Damaso	
17 January 1566	Rome	Pius V	Giulio Feltre della Rovere	S. Pietro in Vincoli	
25 May 1572	Rome	Gregory XIII	Girolamo Simoncelli	SS. Cosma e Damiano	
1 May 1585	Rome	Sixtus V	Ferdinando de' Medici	S. Maria in Domnica	
8 December 1590	Rome	Gregory XIV	Andreas von Austria	S. Maria Nuova	
3 November 1591	Rome	Innocent IX	Andreas von Austria	S. Maria Nuova	
9 February 1592	Rome	Clement VIII	Francesco Sforza di Santa Fiora	S. Maria in Via Lata	On 2 February, he was consecrated bishop of Rome by Cardinal Alfonso Gesualdo, bishop of Ostia e Velletri and dean of the Sacred College of Cardinals.
10 April 1605	Rome	Leo XI	Francesco Sforza di Santa Fiora	S. Maria in Via Lata	
29 May 1605	Rome	Paul V	Francesco Sforza di Santa Fiora	S. Maria in Via Lata	
14 February 1621	Rome	Gregory XV	Andrea Baroni Peretti Montalto	S. Maria in Via Lata	
29 September 1623	Rome	Urban VIII	Alessandro d'Este	S. Maria in Via Lata	
4 October 1644	Rome	Innocent X	Carlo de Medici	S. Nicola in Carcere Tulliano	
16 April 1655	Rome	Alexander VII	Giangiacomo Teodoro Trivulzio	S. Maria in Via Lata	
26 June 1667	Rome	Clement IX	Rinaldo d'Este	S. Nicola in Carcere Tulliano	
11 May 1670	Rome	Clement X	Francesco Maidalchini	S. Maria in Via Lata	
4 October 1676	Rome	Innocent XI	Francesco Maidalchini	S. Maria in Via Lata	
16 October 1689	Rome	Alexander VIII	Francesco Maidalchini	S. Maria in Via Lata	
15 July 1691	Rome	Innocent XII	Urbano Sacchetti	S. Maria in Via Lata	
8 December 1700	Rome	Clement XI	Benedetto Pamphili	S. Maria in Via Lata	On 30 November, he was consecrated bishop of Rome by Cardinal de Bouillon, bishop of Porto e Santa Rufina and dean of the Sacred College of Cardinals.
18 May 1721	Rome	Innocent XIII	Pietro Ottoboni	S. Lorenzo in Damaso	Cardinal Ottoboni as the second senior cardinal-deacon, assumed the protodeacon's responsibilities at the coronation due to the absence of Benedetto Pamphili, the incumbent protodeacon
4 June 1724	Rome	Benedict XIII	Pietro Ottoboni	S. Lorenzo in Damaso	Cardinal Ottoboni as the second senior cardinal-deacon, assumed the protodeacon's responsibilities at the coronation due to the absence of Benedetto Pamphili, the incumbent protodeacon
16 July 1730	Rome	Clement XII	Lorenzo Altieri	S. Maria in Via Lata	
21 August 1740	Rome	Benedict XIV	Carlo Maria Marini	S. Maria in Via Lata	
16 July 1758	Rome	Clement XIII	Alessandro Albani	S. Maria in Via Lata	
4 June 1769	Rome	Clement XIV	Alessandro Albani	S. Maria in Via Lata	On 28 May he was consecrated bishop of Rome by Cardinal Federico Marcello Lante, bishop of Porto e Santa Rufina and sub-dean of the Sacred College of Cardinals.
22 February 1775	Rome	Pius VI	Alessandro Albani	S. Maria in Via Lata	On that same day, he was consecrated bishop of Rome by Cardinal Giovanni Francesco Albani, bishop of Porto e Santa Rufina and dean of the Sacred College of Cardinals.
21 March 1800	Venice	Pius VII	Antonio Doria Pamphili	S. Maria ad Martyres	
5 October 1823	Rome	Leo XII	Fabrizio Ruffo	S. Maria in Via Lata	
5 April 1829	Rome	Pius VIII	Giuseppe Albani	S. Maria in Via Lata	
6 February 1831	Rome	Gregory XVI	Giuseppe Albani	S. Maria in Via Lata	On that same day, he was consecrated bishop of Rome by Cardinal Bartolomeo Pacca, bishop of Ostia e Velletri and dean of the Sacred College of Cardinals.
21 June 1846	Rome	Pius IX	Tommaso Riario Sforza	S. Maria in Via Lata	
3 March 1878	Rome	Leo XIII	Teodolfo Mertel	S. Eustachio	Teodolfo Mertel as the second senior cardinal-deacon, assumed the protodeacon's responsibilities at the coronation due to the illness of Prospero Caterini, the incumbent protodeacon.
9 August 1903	Rome	Pius X	Aloysius Macchi	S. Maria in Via Lata	
6 September 1914	Rome	Benedict XV	Francesco Salesio Della Volpe	S. Maria in Aquiro	
12 February 1922	Rome	Pius XI	Gaetano Bisleti	S. Agata in Suburra	
12 March 1939	Vatican City	Pius XII	Camillo Caccia Dominioni	S. Maria in Domnica	
4 November 1958	Vatican City	John XXIII	Nicola Canali	S. Nicola in Carcere Tulliano	
30 June 1963	Vatican City	Paul VI	Alfredo Ottaviani	S. Maria in Domnica	

== See also ==
- Papal inauguration
- Index of Vatican City-related articles
