= Teodolfo Mertel =

Italian judge, deacon and lay cardinal (1806–1899)

His Eminence, The Most Reverend, Lord Teodolfo Mertel
- Vice-Chancellor of the Holy Roman Church
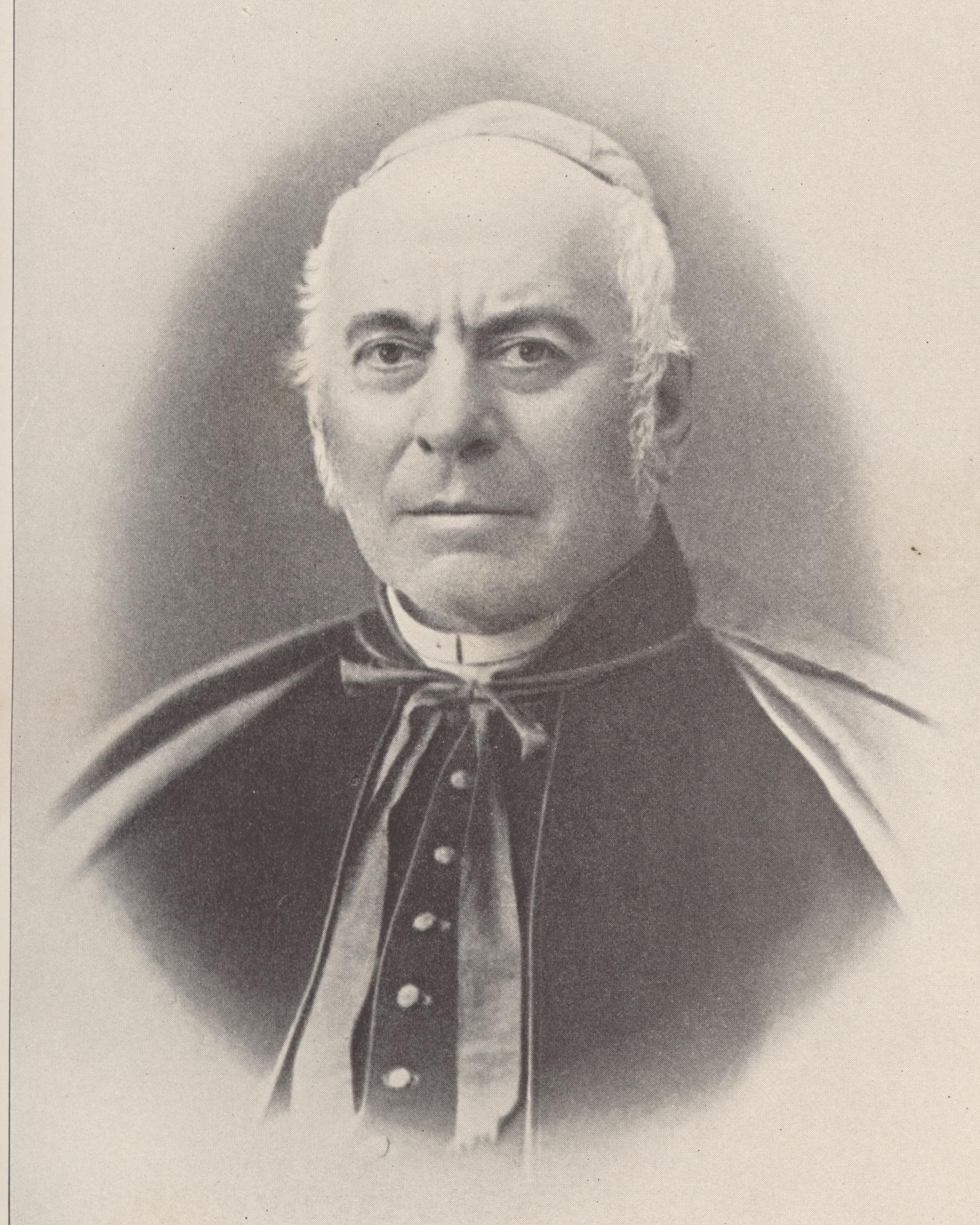
- Church: Roman Catholic
- Archdiocese: Rome
- See: Cardinal Deacon of the Roman Curia
- Installed: 24 March 1884
- Term ended: 11 July 1899
- Predecessor: Antonio Saverio De Luca
- Successor: Lucido Parocchi
- Other posts: Cardinal-Deacon of San Lorenzo in Damaso; Cardinal-Protodeacon
- Previous posts: Cardinal-Deacon of Sant'Eustachio; Cardinal-Deacon of Santa Maria in Via Lata

Orders
- Ordination: 16 May 1858 (deacon) by Pope Pius IX
- Created cardinal: 15 March 1858 by Pope Pius IX
- Rank: Cardinal-Deacon

Personal details
- Born: Teodolfo Mertel; 9 February 1806 Allumiere, Lazio, Papal States
- Died: 11 July 1899 (aged 93) Allumiere, Lazio, Kingdom of Italy
- Buried: Allumiere, Province of Rome, Italy
- Denomination: Catholic
- Parents: Isidore Mertel
- Profession: Lawyer; Judge
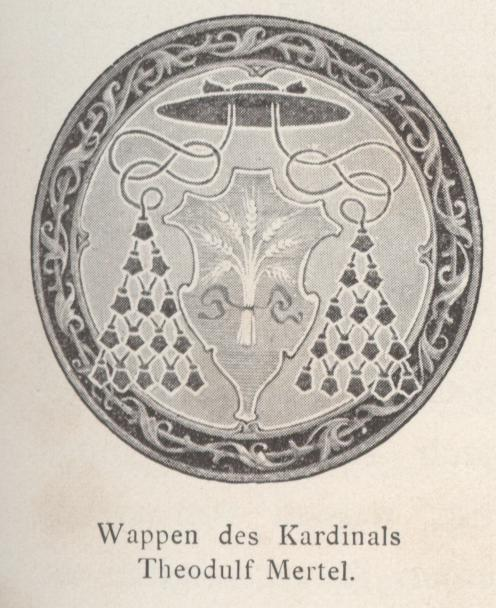
- Coat of arms

Teodolfo Mertel (9 February 1806 – 11 July 1899) was a lawyer, deacon, and cardinal of the Roman Catholic Church. He was the last cardinal not to have been ordained at least a priest.

== Life ==
He was born in the town of Allumiere, in the Province of Lazio, then part of the Papal States, the son of Isidore Mertel, a baker from Bavaria. As a boy he studied at the local parish school, operated by the Capuchin friars in Tolfa. He then studied at the seminary in Montefiascone. After he completed his study of the humanities there, he attended the Sapienza University of Rome, where he was granted a doctorate in both civil and canon law on 16 July 1828.

Mertel became a lawyer of the Roman Curia in 1831, where he was quickly promoted to the position of judge, then to Auditor of the Papal Treasury. He rose his way through the ranks of the Curia. Among his posts was that of Prefect of the Congregation of St. Ives, a society of lawyers and procurators, providing pro bono defense of the poor in the courts.

Pope Pius IX named him a Cardinal Deacon on 15 March 1858, with his titular church being that of the Basilica of Sant'Eustachio. Two months later, on 16 May, Pope Pius ordained him a deacon, so that at the moment when he was created cardinal he in fact was still not in holy orders - the last non-priest in history to be elevated to the cardinalate. Mertel was never ordained a priest, and at the time of his death was the last cardinal never to have been ordained a priest. One result of this was that he attended Mass presided by his secretary Pietro Gasparri, who himself later became a Cardinal best known for his role in securing the Lateran Treaty with the Kingdom of Italy.

Mertel participated in the conclave of 1878, which elected Pope Leo XIII. During the coronation ceremonies, Mertel served as protodeacon and crowned the new pope, since the Cardinal Protodeacon, Prospero Caterini, was unable to do so due to illness. In 1881 he became the Cardinal Protodeacon upon the death of Cardinal Caterini and he also chose to have his title changed to that of the Church of Santa Maria in Via Lata formerly held by the late cardinal.

Pope Leo named Mertel the Vice-Chancellor of the Holy Roman Church in 1884, a post which he held until his death. At that time he had his title changed, this time to that of the Basilica of San Lorenzo in Damaso, attached to the former Chancellery of the Papal States and held by tradition by the cardinals who held that office. Because Cardinal Mertel was not an ordained priest, the cardinal-priest title of San Lorenzo in Damaso was treated as a deaconry pro illa vice.

In his final years, Mertel retired to his hometown, where he died in 1899. His funeral vigil was held in the Church of the Assumption, the main church of the town, and then he was buried in his family's tomb in the Shrine of the Madonna delle Grazie al Monte in the town.

In 1917, eighteen years after Cardinal Mertel's death, Pope Benedict XV decreed through Canon 232 of the 1917 Code of Canon Law that all cardinals must be ordained priests.

== See also ==
- Giacomo Antonelli

Catholic Church titles
Preceded by Ludovico Gazzoli	Cardinal-Deacon of Sant'Eustachio; 18 March 1858 – 18 March 1881	Succeeded by Angelo Jacobini
Preceded by Prospero Caterini	Cardinal Protodeacon; 1881–1899	Succeeded by Luigi Macchi
Preceded by Prospero Caterini	Cardinal-Deacon of Santa Maria in Via Lata; 18 November 1881 – 24 March 1884	Succeeded by Lorenzo Ilarione Randi
Preceded by Antonio Saverio De Luca	Vice-Chancellor of the Holy Roman Church; 24 March 1884 – 11 July 1899	Succeeded by Lucido Parocchi
Preceded by Antonio Saverio De Luca	Cardinal-Deacon of San Lorenzo in Damaso pro illa vice 24 March 1884 – 11 July 1899	Succeeded by Lucido Parocchi
Records
Preceded by John Henry Newman, C.O.	Oldest living Member of the Sacred College; 11 August 1890 – 11 July 1899	Succeeded by Luigi di Canossa
