= Prospero Caterini =

Italian Catholic cardinal (1795–1881)

His Eminence, the Most Rev. Lord Prospero Caterini
- Secretary of the Supreme Sacred Congregation of the Universal and Roman Inquisition
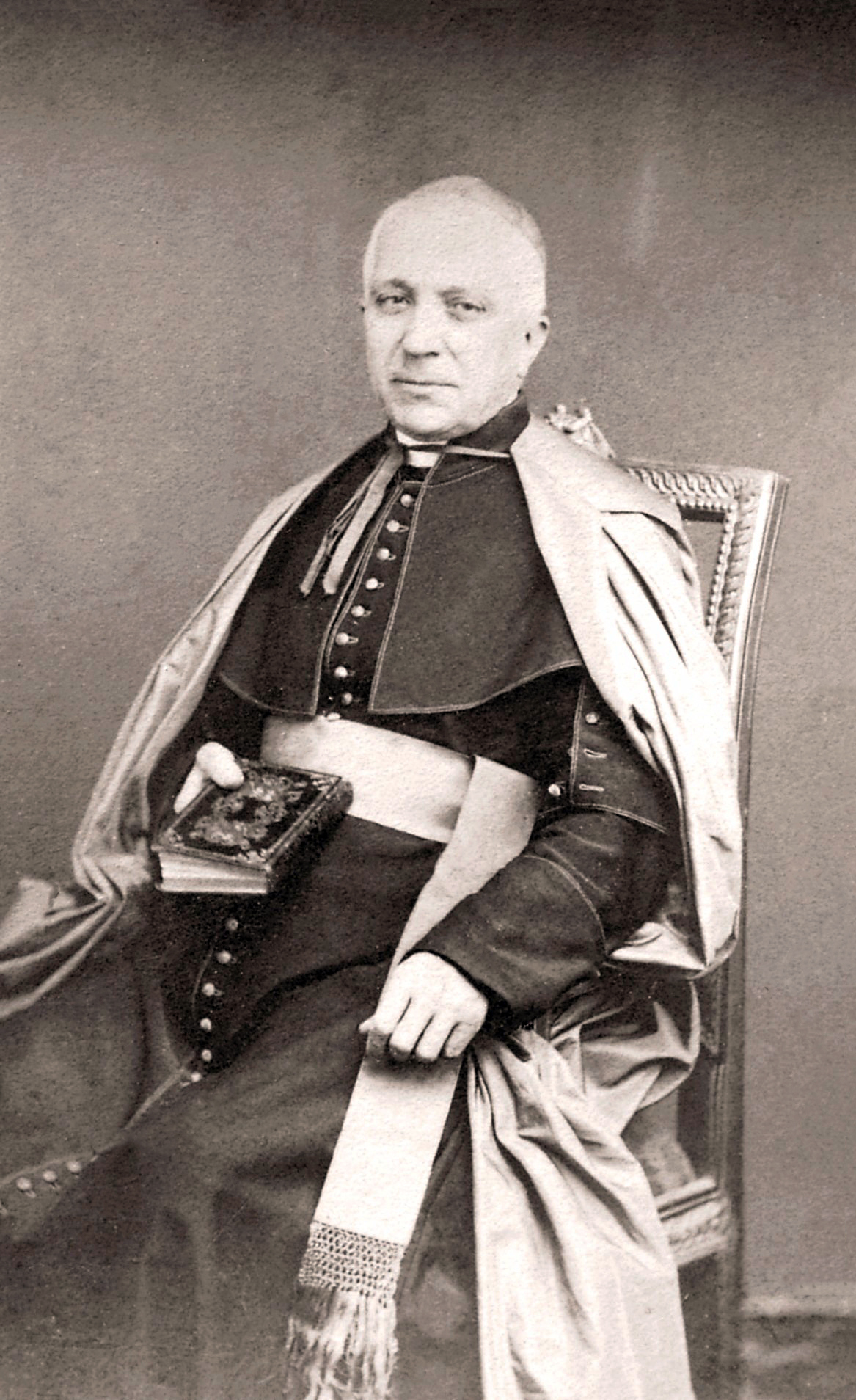
- Prospero Caterini
- Church: Roman Catholic
- Installed: 21 December 1876
- Term ended: 28 October 1881
- Predecessor: Costantino Patrizi Naro
- Successor: Antonio Maria Panebianco
- Other posts: Cardinal-Deacon of Santa Maria della Scala; Cardinal-Deacon of Santa Maria in Via Lata; Cardinal-Protodeacon

Orders
- Created cardinal: 7 March 1853 by Pope Pius IX
- Rank: Cardinal-Deacon

Personal details
- Born: 15 October 1795 Onano, Lazio, Papal States
- Died: 28 October 1881 (aged 86) Rome, Kingdom of Italy
- Buried: Chapel of the confraternity of the Most Precious Blood, Campo Verano cemetery, Rome, Kingdom of Italy
- Denomination: Roman Catholic
- Parents: Francesco Caterini and Maria Domenica Pacelli

Prospero Caterini (15 October 1795, in Onano – 28 October 1881, in Rome) was an Italian cardinal.

== Biography ==
Prospero Caterini was born in Onano, diocese of Acquapendente in the region of Lazio in what was then the Papal States. His parents were Francesco Caterini and Maria Domenica Pacelli both from noble families. Prospero's paternal aunt, Maria Antonia Caterini was married to another Pacelli, Gaetano Pacelli thus making Prospero Caterini a relative to the Pacelli family on both his mother's and father's sides. Maria Antonia Caterini and Gaetano Pacelli were the parents of Marcantonio Pacelli, who served as minister of finance for Pope Gregory XVI and deputy minister of interior under Pope Pius IX from 1851 to 1870 and also founded the newspaper L’Osservatore Romano on 20 July 1860. In 1939, Eugenio Pacelli, one of Marcantonio's grandsons was elected to the papacy as Pope Pius XII.

The Caterinis themselves traced their nobility to the Cattanei or Cattaneo family, specifically to Gualdo Cattaneo whose family were the Counts of Aversa in 1520. The name "Caterini" was taken due to the family's devotion to St. Catherine of Alexandria. Those with the surname Caterini later became part of the nobility of Nocera Umbra, Acquapendente and Onano.

Near Grotte di Castro in the vicinity of Lake Bolsena, the Caterini family had a castle, the Castle of Santa Cristina where the young seminarian Eugenio Pacelli, the future Pope Pius XII would spend his holidays in the company of the Pacelli-Caterini families.

Prospero Caterini completed his studies in Rome. No information has been found as to his ordination history. He served as the substitute secretary of the Sacred Congregation Consistorial and was later the Secretary of the Sacred Congregation of Studies. From 1 March 1841 to 28 November 1845, he was Auditor Santissimi. He was a canon of Saint Peter's Basilica and became an Assessor of the Sacred Congregation of the Inquisition.

Pope Pius IX created him a cardinal on 7 March 1853 and three days later on 10 March, the new cardinal received the red hat and the title of Cardinal-Deacon of Santa Maria della Scala. He became Cardinal-Protodeacon on 6 November 1876 upon the death of the incumbent protodeacon Cardinal Giacomo Antonelli. On 18 December 1876, he opted for and received the title of Cardinal-Deacon of Santa Maria in Via Lata previously held by the late Cardinal Antonelli while retaining in commendam the title to the deaconry of Santa Maria della Scala. On 21 December 1876, he became secretary of the Inquisition.

Prospero Caterini participated as a cardinal-elector in the conclave of 1878. As protodeacon, he announced at the end of the conclave the election of Cardinal Gioacchino Pecci as Pope Leo XIII. (Note: Richard Henry Clarke's book about Leo XIII claims that Prospero Caterini made the announcement of Leo XIII's election and Salvador Miranda's entry on Cardinal Caterini at The Cardinals of the Holy Roman Church website mentions Caterini as having given the announcement but Francis Burkle-Young claims that Caterini started to make the announcement but was incapable of completing the formula and was ultimately assisted in delivering the news by Bartolomeo Grassi-Landi, a non-cardinal and the conclavist of Cardinal Luigi Oreglia di Santo Stefano) Due to illness however, he was unable to crown the new pope at his papal coronation, the honor instead went to Cardinal Teodolfo Mertel.

He died on 28 October 1881 and after the wake held at his deaconry, was buried at the chapel of the confraternity of the Most Precious Blood in Campo Verano cemetery in Rome.

== See also ==
- Our Lady of La Salette

== Bibliography ==
- Caterini Carlo. Gens Catherina de terra Balii. Edizioni Scientifiche Calabresi.Rende 2009.

Catholic Church titles
Preceded by Paolo Mangelli Orsi	Cardinal-Deacon of Santa Maria della Scala; 10 March 1853 – 28 October 1881 title held in commendam from 18 December 1876 – 28 October 1881	Succeeded by Pietro Lasagni
Preceded by Giacomo Antonelli	Cardinal Protodeacon; 6 November 1876 – 28 October 1881	Succeeded by Teodolfo Mertel
Preceded by Giacomo Antonelli	Cardinal-Deacon of Santa Maria in Via Lata; 18 December 1876 – 28 October 1881	Succeeded by Teodolfo Mertel
Preceded by Costantino Patrizi Naro	Secretary of the Supreme Sacred Congregation of the Universal and Roman Inquisition; 21 December 1876 – 28 October 1881	Succeeded by Antonio Maria Panebianco
Records
Preceded by René-François Régnier	Oldest living Member of the Sacred College; 3 January – 28 October 1881	Succeeded by Ferdinand-François-Auguste Donnet
