= Isidoro Verga =

Italian canon lawyer and cardinal

His Eminence Isidoro Verga
- Major Penitentiary of the Apostolic Penitentiary
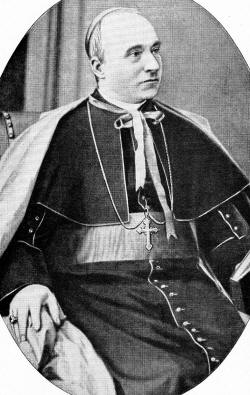
- Church: Roman Catholic Church
- Appointed: 1 October 1896
- Term ended: 10 August 1899
- Predecessor: Raffaele Monaco La Valletta
- Successor: Serafino Vannutelli
- Other post: Cardinal-Bishop of Albano (1896–99)
- Previous posts: Secretary for Seminaries of the Congregation of the Council (1877–78); Secretary of the Congregation of the Council (1878–84); Cardinal-Deacon of Sant'Angelo in Pescheria (1884–91); Prefect of the Apostolic Signatura (1885–88); Prefect of the Congregation of Bishops and Regulars (1888–96); Cardinal-Deacon of Santa Maria in Via Lata (1891–96); Protodeacon (1891–96); Cardinal-Priest of San Callisto (1896)

Orders
- Ordination: 1859
- Consecration: 13 December 1896 by Luigi Oreglia di Santo Stefano
- Created cardinal: 10 November 1884 by Pope Leo XIII
- Rank: Cardinal-Deacon (1884–96); Cardinal-Priest (1896); Cardinal-Bishop (1896–99)

Personal details
- Born: Isidoro Verga; 29 April 1832 Bassano Taverina, Viterbo, Papal States
- Died: 10 August 1899 (aged 67) Rome, Kingdom of Italy
- Buried: Campo Verano
- Education: Collegio Romano; La Sapienza University
- Coat of arms

Isidoro Verga (29 April 1832 – 10 August 1899) was an Italian canon lawyer and cardinal.

He studied at the diocesan seminaries of Orte and Viterbo, then studied theology at the Roman College and canon law at La Sapienza University; in 1859, he was ordained a priest and practiced as a lawyer at the Tribunal of the Roman Rota.

He was created cardinal in 1884, and became bishop of Albano and Apostolic Penitentiary in 1896. He was given the titular church of San Callisto.

Using a gift from his brother Antonio, he bought a building in his home town of Teverina, to be used by the Sisters of Saint Anne for the religious education of young people.

== Notes ==
Catholic Church titles
Preceded by Tommaso Maria Zigliara, O.P.	Cardinal Protodeacon; 1 June 1891 – 22 June 1896	Succeeded by Luigi Macchi
