= Santa Maria in Via Lata =

- Church of Saint Mary on the Broad Way
- Chiesa di Santa Maria in Via Lata
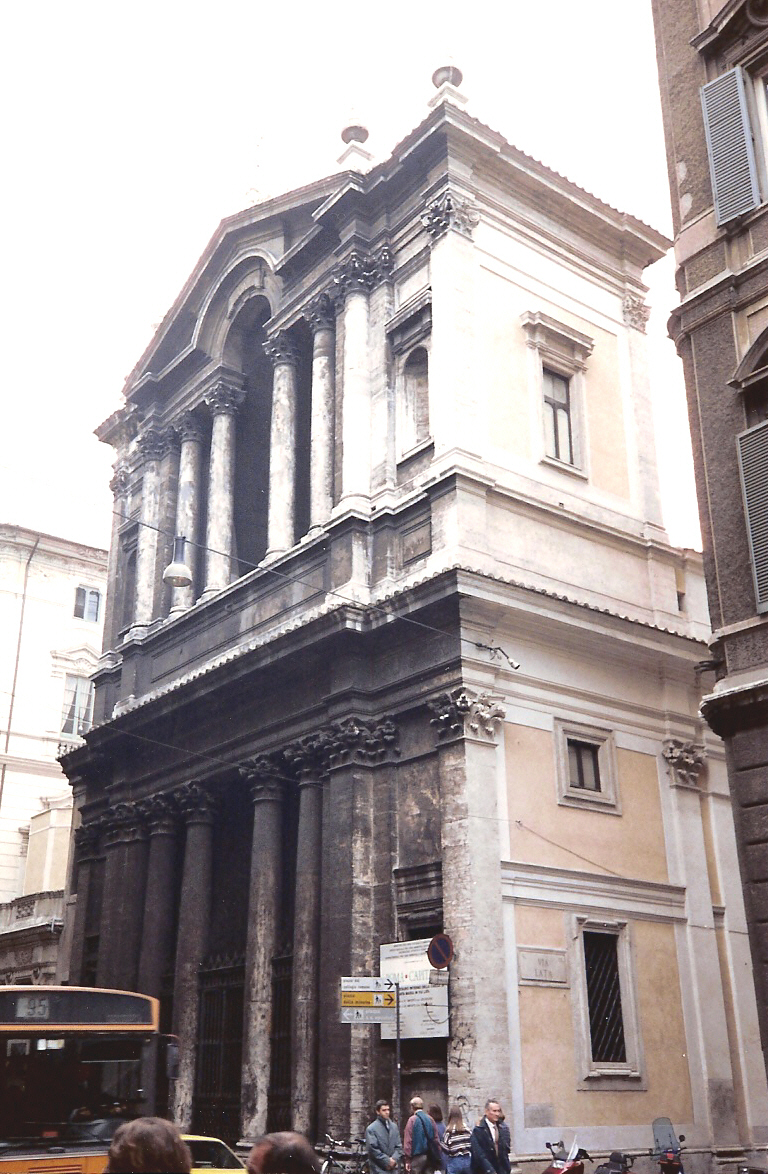
- Facade by Pietro da Cortona
- Click on the map for a fullscreen view
- 41.898154°N 12.481300°E
- Location: Via del Corso 306, Rome
- Country: Italy
- Language: Italian
- Denomination: Catholic
- Tradition: Latin Church
- Religious institute: Daughters of the Church
- Website: www.cryptavialata.it/index.html

History
- Status: titular church
- Founded: 4th century AD?
- Dedication: Mary, mother of Jesus: Quiriacus of Ostia

Architecture
- Architect: Pietro da Cortona
- Architectural type: Baroque, Early Christian
- Completed: 1662

Administration
- Diocese: Rome

Santa Maria in Via Lata is a church on the Via del Corso (the ancient Via Lata), in Rome, Italy. It stands diagonal from the church of San Marcello al Corso. It is the stational church for Tuesday in the fifth week of lent.

== History ==
The first Christian place of worship here was a 5th-century oratory (chapel with welfare centre) in the Roman building beneath the present church. This was constructed within the remains of a large Roman warehouse, some 250 metres (820 ft) long, which has also been excavated. Murals were added to the lower level between the 7th and 9th centuries (these have been detached for conservation reasons).

By the beginning of the 10th century, the building was used as the palace of Theophylact I, Count of Tusculum, with the Byzantine icon on the main altar of the church originally forming a part of their private chapel.

Due to the frequent flooding of the Tiber, in 1049 the church was rebuilt with an upper level added.

== Architecture ==
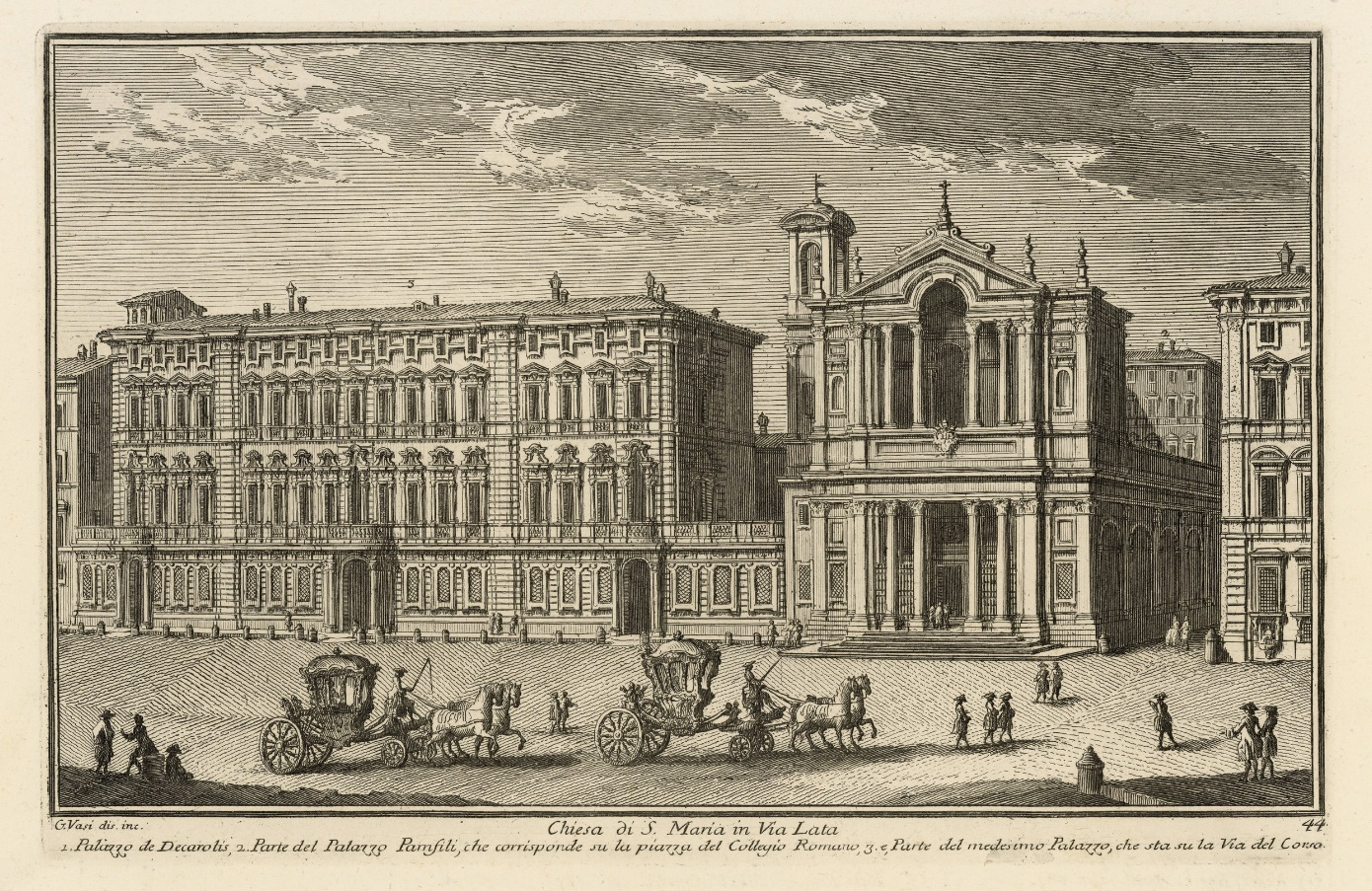
Engraving by Giuseppe Vasi of the Palazzo Doria Pamphilj and Santa Maria in Via Lata, mid-18th century

The Arcus Novus, an arch erected in 303–304 by the emperor Diocletian, which stood on this site, was destroyed during reconstruction of the church in 1491. Antonio Tebaldeo, poet and friend of Raphael, was buried at the end of the north aisle in 1537, though his tomb was designed in 1776. The bell tower is by Martino Longhi the Elder and was built in 1580. There are three bells, two of which bear dates: 1615 and 1465. The bells were reactivated in 2017, with automated programs.

In anticipation of the Holy Year of 1650, the church was renovated in 1639 by Cosimo Fanzago, but the façade, with its Corinthian columns imposing vertical emphasis, was completed (1658–1660) based on a design by Pietro da Cortona. He appears to evoke a triumphal arch in the facade. The church is built of brick, with limestone details. The facade is done in travertine.

=== Interior ===
Beginning in 1636 and continuing over the next 15 years, the interior was renovated, beginning with the apse and sanctuary and continuing with the nave. On the high altar is the church's 13th century icon of the Madonna Advocata, said to have performed many miracles. The ciborium in the apse is made of alabaster and lapis-lazuli.

The church does not have side chapels, but niches. To the right of the entrance is the baptistery, with a font of black marble. Along the right side of the nave, the first altarpiece is a Martydom of St Andrew (1685) by Giacinto Brandi, while the second altarpiece is a Saints Giuseppe, Nicola, and Biagio by Giuseppe Ghezzi. In the chapel to the left of the apse, is a Madonna with child and Saints Cyriac and Catherine by Giovanni Odazzi. The second altar on the left has a Saint Paul baptizes Sabine and children by Pier Leone Ghezzi while the first altarpiece is a Virgin and Saints Lawrence and Anthony by Pietro de Pietri. Six oval paintings on the right nave include canvases by P. de Pietri and Agostino Masucci. On the left nave are five ovals, painted by P. de Pietri, Masucci, and Giovanni Domenico Piastrini. In the Chapel of the Sacrament at the bottom of the right aisle are the remains of a Cosmatesque-style polychrome marble floor.

St. Paul is said to have spent two years here, in what is now the crypt of the church, while under house arrest awaiting his trial. This conflicts with the tradition regarding San Paolo alla Regola. The same was also claimed for St Peter, Paul's secretary Luke, and the martyr Martial.

An altar in the lower church has a marble bas relief by Cosimo Fancelli commemorating the first excavations of the site. Due to its proximity to the Roman residence of Napoleon's mother, some members of the Bonaparte family were temporarily buried in the church.

== List of cardinal deacons ==
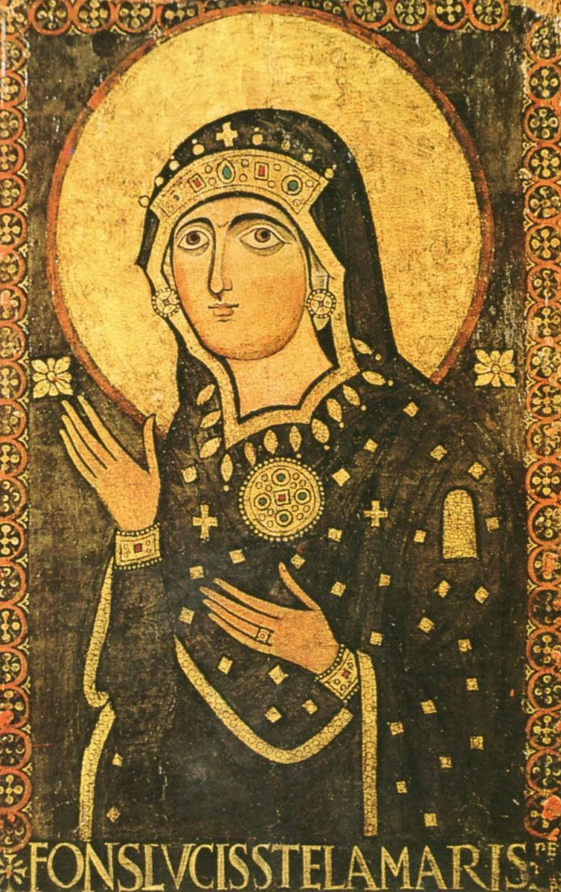
Early Medieval Stella Maris icon at the basilica

- Hadrian (before 772)
- Romualdo Guarna (1112–1122)
- Guido de Castello (1127–1133)
- Petrus Capuanus (1193–1200)
- John of Ferentino (1204/5–1212)
- Thomas Capuanus (1216)
- Giacomo Colonna (1278–1297)
- Luca Fieschi (1300–1306)
- Nicolas de Besse (1344–1369)
- Pierre de Vergne (1371–1403)
- Antonio de Challant (1404–1412)
- Domenico Capranica (1430–1444); in commendam (1444–1458)
- Rodrigo Lanzol-Borja y Borja, in commendam (1458–1492)
- vacant (1492–1496)
- Juan de Borja Llançol de Romaní (1496–1500)
- Pedro Luis de Borja Llançol de Romaní (1500–1503); in commendam (1503–1511)
- Marco Cornaro (1513–1523)
- Alessandro Cesarini (1523–1540)
- Nicolò Ridolfi (1540–1550)
- Innocenzo Cibo (1550)
- Niccolò Gaddi (1550–1552)
- Guido Ascanio Sforza di Santa Fiora (1552–1564)
- Ippolito II d'Este (1564)
- Vitellozzo Vitelli (1564–1568)
- Innocenzo Ciocchi del Monte (1568–1577)
- Antonio Carafa (1577–1583)
- Luigi d'Este (1583–1586)
- Ferdinando I de’ Medici (1587–1588)
- Francesco Sforza (1588–1617)
- Odoardo Farnese (1617–1621)
- Andrea Baroni Peretti Montalto (1621)
- Alessandro d'Este (1621–1623)
- Carlo Emmanuele Pio di Savoia (1623–1626)
- Maurizio di Savoia (1626–1642)
- Antonio Barberini (1642–1653)
- Giangiacomo Teodoro Trivulzio (1653–1655)
- Giulio Gabrielli (1655–1656)
- Viriginio Orsini (1656–1666)
- Francesco Maidalchini (1666–1689)
- Nicolò Acciaioli (1689)
- Urbano Sacchetti (1689–1693)
- Benedetto Pamphilj (1693–1730)
- Lorenzo Altieri (1730–1741)
- Carlo Maria Marini (1741–1747)
- Alessandro Albani (1747–1779)
- Domenico Orsini d'Aragona (1779–1789)
- Ignazio Gaetano Boncompagni-Ludovisi (1789–1790)
- Gregorio Antonio Maria Salviati (1790–1794)
- Vincenzo Maria Altieri (1794–1798)
- Antonio Maria Doria Pamphilj (1800–1821)
- Fabrizio Dionigi Ruffo (1821–1827)
- Giuseppe Albani (1828–1834)
- Tommaso Riario Sforza (1834–1857)
- Ludovico Gazzoli (1857–1858)
- Giuseppe Ugolini (1858–1867)
- Giacomo Antonelli (1868–1876)
- Prospero Caterini (1876–1881)
- Teodolfo Mertel (1881–1884)
- Lorenzo Ilarione Randi (1884–1887)
- Joseph Hergenröther (1887–1890)
- Isidoro Verga (1891–1896)
- Luigi Macchi (1896–1907)
- vacant (1907–1911)
- Louis Billot SJ (1911–1927)
- vacant (1927–1937)
- Giuseppe Pizzardo, cardinal priest pro hac vice (1937–1948)
- vacant (1948–1953)
- Valerian Gracias, cardinal priest pro hac vice (1953–1978)
- Wladyslaw Rubin (1979–1990); cardinal priest pro hac vice (1990)
- Edward Idris Cassidy (1991–2021); cardinal priest pro hac vice (2002–2021)
- Fortunato Frezza (2022–present)

== Bibliography ==
- Titi, Filippo (1763). Descrizione delle Pitture, Sculture e Architetture esposte in Roma. Marco Pagliarini, Rome. pp. 318–319.
- Luigi Cavazzi, La diaconia di S. Maria in Via Lata e il monastero di S. Ciriaco: memorie storiche (Roma: F. Pustet, 1908).
- Richard Krautheimer, Corpus Basilicarum Christianarum Romae: The Early Christian Basilicas of Rome (IV-IX Cent.) (Roma:Pontificio Istituto de archeologia cristiana, 1937), pp. 72 ff.
- Santa Maria in Via Lata (Roma: Tip. Centenari, 1959) [Chiese di Roma, cenni religiosi, storici, artistici, 87].
- Tyrone Joseph Castellarin, The Facade of Santa Maria in Via Lata by Pietro Da Cortona (Columbus OH: Ohio State University Press 1966) [dissertation].
- Carlo Bertelli and Carlo Galassi Paluzzi, S. Maria in via Lata (Rome, Marietti, [1971]).
- Ingrid Baumgartner, Regesten aus dem Kapitelarchiv von S. Maria in Via Lata (1201–1259) Teil 1, Teil 2 (Tübingen: Max Niemeyer Verlag, 1994, 1995).
- Marcello Villani, La facciata di S. Maria in via Lata: committenza, iconologia, proporzionamento, ordini (Roma: Quasar 2006).
- Roberta Pardi, La diaconia di Santa Maria in Via Lata, Roma (Roma: Istituto Poligrafico e Zecca dello Stato, 2006).
- Maria Costanza Pierdomenici, La chiesa di Santa Maria in via Lata: note di storia e di restauro (Roma: Gangeni Editore 2011).

Preceded by Santa Maria in Via	Landmarks of Rome; Santa Maria in Via Lata	Succeeded by Santa Maria della Vittoria, Rome
