= Habemus papam =

Latin announcement of the election of a pope

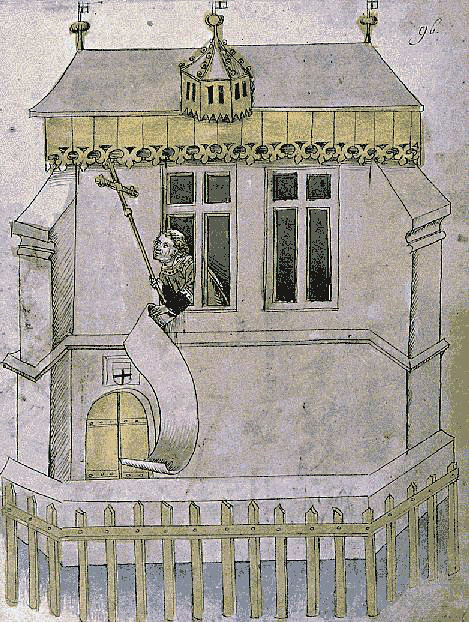
The announcement of the election of Pope Martin V at the Council of Constance

Habemus papam (lit. 'We have a pope') is a Latin phrase used in—as well as the name of—the announcement of the election of a new pope of the Catholic Church, traditionally given by the protodeacon of the College of Cardinals (the senior cardinal deacon in the College) or by the senior cardinal deacon participating in the conclave.

The announcement is made from the central balcony (loggia) of St. Peter's Basilica in the Vatican, overlooking St. Peter's Square. After the announcement, the new pope is presented to the people where he gives his first Urbi et Orbi blessing.

== Format ==
The format for the announcement when a cardinal (Note: While every pope after Urban VI (r. 1378–1389) has been a cardinal, this is not a strict requirement; the conclave is capable of electing any Catholic male, even a layman.) is elected pope has had major changes over time, but recently, it is as follows:

Original Latin

Annuntio vobis gaudium magnum;
habemus papam:
Eminentissimum ac Reverendissimum Dominum,
Dominum [praenomen],
Sanctae Romanae Ecclesiae Cardinalem [nomen],
qui sibi nomen imposuit [nomen pontificale].

English translation

I announce to you with great joy;
we have a pope:
The Most Eminent and Most Reverend Lord,
Lord [first name],
Cardinal of the Holy Roman Church [surname],
who has taken upon himself the name [papal name].

In the Habemus papam announcement given by Cardinal Jorge Medina on 19 April 2005, upon the election of Pope Benedict XVI, the announcement was preceded by an identical greeting in several languages, respectively, Italian, Spanish, French, German, and English:

Fratelli e sorelle carissimi,
Queridísimos hermanos y hermanas,
Bien chers frères et sœurs,
Liebe Brüder und Schwestern,
Dear brothers and sisters,

== History ==
The text of the announcement is partly inspired by the Gospel of Luke (2:10–11), which records the words of the angel announcing to the shepherds the birth of the Messiah:

"Fear not; for, behold, I bring thee good tidings of great joy, that shall be to all the people: For unto thee is born, this day, in the city of David a Saviour, which is Christ the Lord."

In the Vulgate (the Latin translation of the Bible by St. Jerome), the words used are "Evangelizo vobis gaudium magnum", while the word "annuntio" was used in previous translations.

The adoption of this formula is dated from the election of Odo Colonna as Pope Martin V (1417), who was chosen as the new pope by the cardinals and representatives from different countries at the Council of Constance. In this context, prior to Martin V, there were three claimants to the papal throne: Antipope John XXIII (who had called for the council, and appointed most of the cardinal electors), Antipope Benedict XIII (the only one to have been named cardinal before the outbreak of the Western Schism) and Pope Gregory XII. The first two were deposed by the Council itself, and Gregory XII abdicated after formally convoking the already convened council and authorizing its acts including the act of electing his successor. Two years after the first two contenders were deposed (Note: Jesuit professor Norman Tanner claims that Antipope John XXIII actually resigned but under pressure.) and the resignation of the third, the council elected the new pope. The announcement, therefore, could be interpreted as: "(Finally) we have a pope (and only one)!".

The habemus papam formula was adopted before 1484, the year in which it was used to announce the election of Giovanni Cybo, who took the name of Innocent VIII. It was most recently given by Dominique Mamberti after the election of Pope Leo XIV on 8 May 2025.

== Announcement ==
=== Grammatical case of papal name ===
In announcing the name of the newly elected pontiff, the new pontiff's birth first name is announced in Latin, usually in the accusative case (e.g. Carolum, Iosephum, Georgium Marium, Robertum Franciscum), but the new pontiff's surname is announced in the undeclined form (e.g. Wojtyła, Ratzinger, Bergoglio, Prevost), as it is indeclinable.

During the last century, the new papal name has often been given in the genitive case in Latin, corresponding to the translation "who takes the name of ..." (e.g. Ioannis Vigesimi Tertii, Ioannis Pauli Primi), although it can also be declined in the accusative case, corresponding to the translation "who takes the name ...". In the situation where the name is declined in the genitive, the name is considered as a complement of the noun "nomen" while in the instance where the name is declined in the accusative, it is considered as an apposition of the direct object complement nomen in the accusative. Both forms are equally correct. According to certain Latin grammarians though, like Nicola Flocchini, Piera Guidotti Bacci and the Maiorum Lingua Manual, the accusative is the more correct form.

In the announcement of Pius XII's election, his regnal name was declined in the accusative, like the later announcements in 1963 and 2013 where Paul VI's and Francis's regnal names were announced as Paulum Sextum and Franciscum, respectively. During the announcement of Benedict XVI's election, his regnal name was declined by Cardinal Medina in the genitive case (he said Benedicti Decimi Sexti), but in the Holy See website, the page announcing his election with a copy of the Habemus papam formula has Benedict's regnal name declined in the accusative case (i.e., Benedictum Decimum Sextum)

=== Regnal number ===
If a papal name is used for the first time, the announcement may or may not use the numeral Primi ("the First"). In John Paul I's election, the numeral Primi was used (Cardinal Protodeacon Pericle Felici announced the papal name as Ioannis Pauli Primi) but in Francis's election, no numeral was uttered (Cardinal Protodeacon Jean-Louis Tauran simply gave the papal name as Franciscum).

The numeral in the papal name if it exists can be omitted if the new regnal name is the same as the one used by the immediate predecessor, as was the case in October 1978, when John Paul II's regnal name was announced simply as Ioannis Pauli without the numeral, since his immediate predecessor was John Paul I. It also happened in 1939, when Pius XII's regnal name, following his election, was announced simply as Pium since his immediate predecessor was Pius XI.

=== Other variations ===
During the announcement of Paul VI's election, protodeacon Alfredo Ottaviani used the conjunction et (which also means "and") instead of ac, the word usually used for "and" within the formula (he said Eminentissimum et reverendissimum instead of Eminentissimum ac reverendissimum).

=== Examples ===
The following are examples of how the names were announced as noted on existing videos and recordings. The case and inclusion or exclusion of numeral for the papal names are noted.

Birth name	First name (in Latin, accusative)	Surname (in original language's pronunciation and spelling, undeclined)	Papal name	Papal name as announced in Latin	Latin declension of papal name	Regnal number in papal name	Ref.
Eugenio Pacelli	Eugenium	Pacelli	Pius XII	Pium	accusative	not given	
Angelo Giuseppe Roncalli	Angelum Iosephum	Roncalli	John XXIII	Ioannis XXIII (Ioannis Vigesimi Tertii)	genitive	given	
Giovanni Battista Montini	Ioannem Baptistam	Montini	Paul VI	Paulum VI (Paulum Sextum)	accusative	given	
Albino Luciani	Albinum	Luciani	John Paul I	Ioannis Pauli I (Ioannis Pauli Primi)	genitive	given	
Karol Wojtyła	Carolum	Wojtyła	John Paul II	Ioannis Pauli	genitive	not given	
Joseph Ratzinger	Iosephum	Ratzinger	Benedict XVI	Benedicti XVI (Benedicti Decimi Sexti)	genitive	given	
Jorge Mario Bergoglio	Georgium Marium	Bergoglio	Francis	Franciscum	accusative	none	
Robert Francis Prevost	Robertum Franciscum	Prevost	Leo XIV	Leonem XIV (Leonem Decimum Quartum)	accusative	given	

== Evolution of the formula ==
From the beginning, the Habemus papam did not follow a strict formula, but varied in considerable form for many years. The table shows selected announcements given since the 1484 papal conclave.

Date	Announced by (Protodeacon or senior cardinal deacon)	Pope elected	Announcement	English translation
29 August 1484	Francesco Piccolomini	Giovanni Cybo – elected Innocent VIII	Annuntio vobis gaudium magnum; papam habemus: Reverendissimus Dominus Cardinalis Melfictensis electus est in summum pontificem et elegit sibi nomen Innocentium Octavum.	I announce to you a great joy: we have a pope: The Most Reverend Lord Cardinal, Bishop of Molfetta, has been elected as supreme pontiff, and has chosen for himself the name Innocent the Eighth.
1 November 1503	Raffaele Riario	Giuliano della Rovere – elected Julius II	Papam habemus: Reverendissimum Dominum Cardinalem Sancti Petri ad Vincula, qui vocatur Julius Secundus.	We have a pope: The Most Reverend Lord Cardinal [Priest] of San Pietro in Vincoli, who is called Julius the Second.
11 March 1513	Alessandro Farnese	Giovanni de' Medici – elected Leo X Cardinal protodeacon at time of election	Gaudium magnum nuntio vobis; papam habemus: Reverendissimum Dominum Iohannem de Medicis, Diaconum Cardinalem Sanctae Mariae in Domenica, qui vocatur Leo Decimus.	A great joy I announce to you; we have a pope: The Most Reverend Lord Giovanni de' Medici, Cardinal Deacon of Santa Maria in Domnica, who is called Leo the Tenth.
13 October 1534	Innocenzo Cybo	Alessandro Farnese – elected Paul III	Annuntio vobis gaudium magnum; papam habemus: Reverendissimum Dominum Alexandrum Episcopum Hostiensem, Cardinalem de Farnesio nuncupatum, qui imposuit sibi nomen Paulus Tertius.	I announce to you a great joy; we have a pope: The Most Reverend Lord Alexander, Designated Bishop of Ostia and Cardinal Farnese, who has taken upon himself the name Paul the Third.
15 September 1644	Francesco Barberini	Giovanni Pamphili – elected Innocent X	Annuntio vobis gaudium magnum; habemus papam: Eminentissimum et Reverendissimum Dominum Iohannem Baptistum Pamphilium, qui sibi nomen imposuit Innocentium Decimum.	I announce to you a great joy; we have a pope: The Most Eminent and Most Reverend Lord Giovanni Battista Pamphili, who has taken upon himself the name Innocent the Tenth.
7 April 1655	Giangiacomo Teodoro Trivulzio	Fabio Chigi – elected Alexander VII	Annuntio vobis gaudium magnum; papam habemus: Eminentissimum et Reverendissimum Dominum Fabium, Sanctae Romanae Ecclesiae Presbyterum Cardinalem Chisium, qui elegit sibi nomen Alexandrum Septimum.	I announce to you a great joy; we have a pope: The Most Eminent and Most Reverend Lord Fabio, Cardinal Priest of the Holy Roman Church Chigi, who has chosen for himself the name Alexander the Seventh.
29 April 1670	Francesco Maidalchini	Emilio Altieri – elected Clement X	Annuncio vobis gaudium magnum; papam habemus: Eminentissimus ac Reverendissimus Dominus Aemilius, Sanctae Romanae Eclessiae Presbyter Cardinalis Alterius, electus est in summum Pontificem, qui sibi nomen imposuit: Clemens Decimus.	I announce to you a great joy; we have a pope: The Most Eminent and Most Reverend Lord Emilio, Cardinal Priest of the Holy Roman Church Altieri, has been elected to the highest pontificate, who has taken upon himself the name: Clement the Tenth.
21 September 1676	Francesco Maidalchini	Benedetto Odeschalchi – elected Innocent XI	Annuntio vobis gaudium magnum; papam habemus: Reverendissimum Benedictum, Titulo Sancti Honufrii Cardinalem Odeschalcum, qui sibi nomen imposuit Innocentium Undecimum.	I announce to you a great joy; we have a pope: The Most Reverend Lord Benedetto, Cardinal [Priest] of the title of Sant'Onofrio, Odescalchi, who has taken upon himself the name Innocent the Eleventh.
8 May 1721	Benedetto Pamphili	Michelangelo dei Conti – elected Innocent XIII	Annuntio vobis gaudium magnum; papam habemus: Eminentissimum et Reverendissimum Dominum Michaelem Angelum, Tituli Sanctorum Quirici et Iulitta Sanctae Romanae Ecclesiae Presbyterum Cardinalem de Comitibus, qui sibi nomen imposuit Innocentius Decimus Tertius. (Note: There is no known audio record of this announcement; the regnal number may have been announced with Decimus (as well as its genitive and accusative forms Decimi and Decimum, respectively) uttered last, as the order is interchangeable in Latin.)	I announce to you a great joy; we have a pope: The Most Eminent and Most Reverend Lord Michelangelo, Cardinal Priest of the Holy Roman Church of the title of Santi Quirico e Giulitta, Conti, who has taken upon himself the name Innocent the Thirteenth.
29 May 1724	Benedetto Pamphili	Pierfrancesco Orsini – elected Benedict XIII	Annuntio vobis gaudium magnum; papam habemus: Eminentissimum et Reverendissimum Dominum Fratrem Vincentium Mariam Cardinalem Ursinum, Episcopum Portuensem, qui sibi nomen imposuit Benedictus Decimus Tertius.	I announce to you a great joy; we have a pope: The Most Eminent and Most Reverend Lord Brother Vincenzo Maria Cardinal Orsini, Bishop of Porto, who has taken upon himself the name Benedict the Thirteenth.
12 July 1730	Lorenzo Altieri	Lorenzo Corsini – elected Clement XII	Annuncio vobis gaudium magnum; papam habemus: Eminentissimum et Reverendissimum Dominum Laurentium, Sanctae Romanae Ecclesiae Cardinalem Corsinum Episcopum Tusculanum, qui sibi Nomen imposuit Clemens Duodecimus.	I announce to you great joy; we have a pope: The Most Eminent and Most Reverend Lord Lorenzo Cardinal Corsini of the Holy Roman Church, Bishop of Tusculana, who has taken upon himself the name Clement the Twelfth.
17 August 1740	Carlo Maria Marini	Prospero Lambertini – elected Benedict XIV	Annuncio vobis gaudium magnum; habemus papam: Eminentissimum ac Reverendissimum Dominum Prosperum, tituli Sanctae Crucis in Ierusalem, Presbyterum Sanctae Romanae Ecclesiae Cardinalem Lambertinum, Archiepiscopum Bononiensem, qui sibi nomen imposuit Benedictus Decimus Quartus.	I announce to you great joy; we have a pope: The Most Eminent and Most Reverend Lord Prospero, Cardinal Priest of the Holy Roman Church of the title of Santa Croce in Gerusalemme Lambertini, Archbishop of Bologna, who has taken upon himself the name Benedict the Fourteenth.
15 February 1775	Alessandro Albani	Giovanni Braschi – elected Pius VI	Nuntio vobis gaudium magnum; papam habemus: Eminentissimum et Reverendissimum Dominum Ioannem Angelum, tituli Sancti Onuphrii Sanctae Romanae Ecclesiae Presbyterum Cardinalem Braschi, qui sibi nomen imposuit Pius Sextus.	I announce to you a great joy; we have a pope: The Most eminent and Most Reverend Lord Giovanni Angelo, Cardinal Priest of the Holy Roman Church of the title of Sant'Onofrio Braschi, who has taken upon himself the name Pius the Sixth.
28 September 1823	Fabrizio Ruffo	Annibale della Genga – elected Leo XII	Annuntio vobis gaudium magnum; papam habemus: Eminentissimum ac Reverendissimum Dominum Annibalem, tituli Sanctae Mariae Transtiberim, Presbyterum Sanctae Romanae Ecclesiae Cardinalem Della Genga, qui sibi imposuit nomen Leo Duodecimus.	I announce to you a great joy; we have a pope: The Most Eminent and Most Reverend Lord Annibale, Cardinal Priest of the Holy Roman Church of the title of Santa Maria in Trastevere Della Genga, who has taken upon himself the name Leo the Twelfth.
2 February 1831	Giuseppe Albani	Bartolomeo Cappellari – elected Gregory XVI	Annuntio vobis gaudium magnum; papam habemus: Eminentissimum ac Reverendissimum Dominum Maurum, Sanctae Romanae Ecclesiae Presbyterum Cardinalem Cappellari, qui sibi nomen imposuit Gregorius Decimus Sextus.	I announce to you a great joy; we have a pope: The Most Eminent and Most Reverend Lord Mauro, Cardinal Priest of the Holy Roman Church Cappellari, who has taken upon himself the name Gregory the Sixteenth.
17 June 1846	Tommaso Riario Sforza	Giovanni Mastai-Ferretti – elected Pius IX	Annuntio vobis gaudium magnum; papam habemus: Eminentissimum et Reverendissimum Dominum Ioannem Mariam Mastai Ferretti, Sanctae Romanae Ecclesiae Presbyterum Cardinalem, qui sibi nomen imposuit Pius Nonus.	I announce to you a great joy; we have a pope: The Most Eminent and Most Reverend Lord Giovanni Maria Mastai Ferretti, Cardinal Priest of the Holy Roman Church, who has taken upon himself the name Pius the Ninth.
20 February 1878	Prospero Caterini	Gioacchino Pecci – elected Leo XIII	Annuntio vobis gaudium magnum; habemus papam: Eminentissimum et Reverendissimum Dominum Ioachim Pecci, qui sibi nomen imposuit Leonis Decimi Tertii. (Note: Although this version of the announcement was published through (semi-)official channels, other contemporary sources indicate that Cardinal Caterini, the aged protodeacon, broke down after the first two words, after which a young assistant - Bartolomeo Grassi Landi, conclavist to Cardinal Oreglia - called out the name of the new Pope in Italian.)	I announce to you a great joy; we have a pope: The Most Eminent and Most Reverend Lord Gioacchino Pecci, who has taken upon himself the name Leo the Thirteenth.
4 August 1903	Aloysius Macchi	Giuseppe Sarto – elected Pius X	Annuntio vobis gaudium magnum; habemus papam: Eminentissimum et Reverendissimum Cardinalem Iosephum Sarto, qui sibi nomen imposuit Pius Decimus.	I announce to you a great joy; we have a pope: The Most Eminent and Most Reverend Cardinal Giuseppe Sarto, who has taken upon himself the name Pius the Tenth.
3 September 1914	Francesco Salesio Della Volpe	Giacomo della Chiesa – elected Benedict XV	Annuntio vobis gaudium magnum; habemus papam: Eminentissimum ac Reverendissimum Dominum Cardinalem Iacobum della Chiesa, qui sibi nomen imposuit Benedictum Decimum Quintum.	I announce to you a great joy; we have a pope: The Most Eminent and Most Reverend Lord Cardinal Giacomo della Chiesa, who has taken upon himself the name Benedict the Fifteenth.
6 February 1922	Gaetano Bisleti	Achille Ratti – elected Pius XI	Annuntio vobis gaudium magnum; habemus papam: Eminentissimum ac Reverendissimum Dominum Cardinalem Achillem Ratti, qui sibi nomen imposuit Pius Undecimus.	I announce to you a great joy; we have a pope: The Most Eminent and Most Reverend Lord Cardinal Achille Ratti, who has taken upon himself the name Pius the Eleventh.
2 March 1939	Camillo Caccia Dominioni	Eugenio Pacelli – elected Pius XII	Annuntio vobis gaudium magnum; habemus papam: Eminentissimum ac Reverendissimum Dominum, Dominum Eugenium, Sanctae Romanae Ecclesiae Cardinalem Pacelli, qui sibi nomen imposuit Pium.	I announce to you a great joy; we have a pope: The Most Eminent and Most Reverend Lord, Lord Eugenio, Cardinal of the Holy Roman Church Pacelli, who has taken upon himself the name Pius.
28 October 1958	Nicola Canali	Angelo Roncalli – elected John XXIII	Annuntio vobis gaudium magnum; habemus papam: Eminentissimum ac Reverendissimum Dominum, Dominum Angelum Iosephum, Sanctae Romanae Ecclesiae Cardinalem Roncalli, qui sibi nomen imposuit Ioannis Vigesimi Tertii.	I announce to you a great joy; we have a pope: The Most Eminent and Most Reverend Lord, Lord Angelo Giuseppe, Cardinal of the Holy Roman Church Roncalli, who has taken upon himself the name John the Twenty-Third.
21 June 1963	Alfredo Ottaviani	Giovanni Montini – elected Paul VI	Annuntio vobis gaudium magnum; habemus papam: Eminentissimum et Reverendissimum Dominum, Dominum Ioannem Baptistam, Sanctae Romanae Ecclesiae Cardinalem Montini, qui sibi nomen imposuit Paulum Sextum.	I announce to you a great joy; we have a pope: The Most Eminent and Most Reverend Lord, Lord Giovanni Battista, Cardinal of the Holy Roman Church Montini, who has taken upon himself the name Paul the Sixth.
26 August 1978	Pericle Felici	Albino Luciani – elected John Paul I	Annuntio vobis gaudium magnum; habemus papam: Eminentissimum ac Reverendissimum Dominum, Dominum Albinum, Sanctae Romanae Ecclesiae Cardinalem Luciani, qui sibi nomen imposuit Ioannis Pauli Primi.	I announce to you a great joy; we have a pope: The Most Eminent and Most Reverend Lord, Lord Albino, Cardinal of the Holy Roman Church Luciani, who has taken upon himself the name John Paul the First.
16 October 1978	Pericle Felici	Karol Wojtyła – elected John Paul II	Annuntio vobis gaudium magnum; habemus papam: Eminentissimum ac Reverendissimum Dominum, Dominum Carolum, Sanctae Romanae Ecclesiae Cardinalem Wojtyła, qui sibi nomen imposuit Ioannis Pauli.	I announce to you a great joy; we have a pope: The Most Eminent and Most Reverend Lord, Lord Karol, Cardinal of the Holy Roman Church Wojtyła, who has taken upon himself the name John Paul.
19 April 2005	Jorge Medina	Joseph Ratzinger – elected Benedict XVI	Fratelli e sorelle carissimi! ¡Queridísimos hermanos y hermanas! Biens chers frères et sœurs! Liebe Brüder und Schwestern! Dear brothers and sisters! Annuntio vobis gaudium magnum; habemus papam: Eminentissimum ac Reverendissimum Dominum, Dominum Iosephum, Sanctae Romanae Ecclesiae Cardinalem Ratzinger, qui sibi nomen imposuit Benedicti Decimi Sexti.	("Dear brothers and sisters" in Italian, Spanish, French, German, and English); I announce to you a great joy; we have a pope: The Most Eminent and Most Reverend Lord, Lord Joseph, Cardinal of the Holy Roman Church Ratzinger, who has taken upon himself the name Benedict the Sixteenth.
13 March 2013	Jean-Louis Tauran	Jorge Mario Bergoglio – elected Francis	Annuntio vobis gaudium magnum; habemus papam: Eminentissimum ac Reverendissimum Dominum, Dominum Georgium Marium, Sanctae Romanae Ecclesiae Cardinalem Bergoglio, qui sibi nomen imposuit Franciscum.	I announce to you a great joy; we have a pope: The Most Eminent and Most Reverend Lord, Lord Jorge Mario, Cardinal of the Holy Roman Church Bergoglio, who has taken upon himself the name Francis.
8 May 2025	Dominique Mamberti	Robert Francis Prevost – elected Leo XIV	Annuntio vobis gaudium magnum; habemus papam: Eminentissimum ac Reverendissimum Dominum, Dominum Robertum Franciscum, Sanctae Romanae Ecclesiae Cardinalem Prevost, qui sibi nomen imposuit Leonem Decimum Quartum.	I announce to you a great joy; we have a pope: The Most Eminent and Most Reverend Lord, Lord Robert Francis, Cardinal of the Holy Roman Church Prevost, who has taken upon himself the name Leo the Fourteenth.

== List of cardinals who have given the announcement ==
Cardinal	Pope	Year
15th century
Francesco Piccolomini	Innocent VIII	1484
Francesco Piccolomini	Alexander VI	1492
16th century
Raffaele Riario	Pius III	1503
Raffaele Riario	Julius II	1503
Alessandro Farnese	Leo X	1513
Marco Cornaro	Adrian VI	1522
Marco Cornaro	Clement VII	1523
Innocenzo Cybo	Paul III	1534
Innocenzo Cybo	Julius III	1550
Francesco Pisani	Marcellus II	1555
Francesco Pisani	Paul IV	1555
Alessandro Farnese	Pius IV	1559
Giulio Feltre della Rovere	Pius V	1566
Girolamo Simoncelli	Gregory XIII	1572
Luigi d'Este	Sixtus V	1585
Francesco Sforza	Urban VII	1590
Andreas von Österreich	Gregory XIV	1590
Andreas von Österreich	Innocent IX	1591
Andreas von Österreich	Clement VIII	1592
17th century
Francesco Sforza	Leo XI	1605
Francesco Sforza	Paul V	1605
Andrea Baroni Peretti Montalto	Gregory XV	1621
Alessandro d'Este	Urban VIII	1623
Francesco Barberini	Innocent X	1644
Giangiacomo Teodoro Trivulzio	Alexander VII	1655
Rinaldo d'Este	Clement IX	1667
Francesco Maidalchini	Clement X	1670
Francesco Maidalchini	Innocent XI	1676
Francesco Maidalchini	Alexander VIII	1689
Urbano Sacchetti	Innocent XII	1691
18th century
Benedetto Pamphili	Clement XI	1700
Benedetto Pamphili	Innocent XIII	1721
Benedetto Pamphili	Benedict XIII	1724
Lorenzo Altieri	Clement XII	1730
Carlo Maria Marini	Benedict XIV	1740
Alessandro Albani	Clement XIII	1758
Alessandro Albani	Clement XIV	1769
Alessandro Albani	Pius VI	1775
19th century
Antonio Doria Pamphili	Pius VII	1800
Fabrizio Ruffo	Leo XII	1823
Giuseppe Albani	Pius VIII	1829
Giuseppe Albani	Gregory XVI	1831
Tommaso Riario Sforza	Pius IX	1846
Prospero Caterini	Leo XIII	1878
20th century
Aloysius Macchi	Pius X	1903
Francesco Salesio Della Volpe	Benedict XV	1914
Gaetano Bisleti	Pius XI	1922
Camillo Caccia Dominioni	Pius XII	1939
Nicola Canali	John XXIII	1958
Alfredo Ottaviani	Paul VI	1963
Pericle Felici	John Paul I	1978
Pericle Felici	John Paul II	1978
21st century
Jorge Medina	Benedict XVI	2005
Jean-Louis Tauran	Francis	2013
Dominique Mamberti	Leo XIV	2025
