= Pietro Lasagni =

His Eminence Pietro Lasagni
- Cardinal-Deacon of Santa Maria della Scala
- Church: Roman Catholic Church
- Appointed: 30 March 1882
- Term ended: 19 April 1885
- Predecessor: Prospero Caterini
- Successor: Augusto Theodoli

Orders
- Ordination: 17 December 1836
- Created cardinal: 13 December 1880 (in pectore); 27 March 1882 (revealed) by Pope Leo XIII
- Rank: Cardinal-Deacon

Personal details
- Born: Pietro Lasagni; 15 June 1814 Caprarola, Cività Castellana, Papal States
- Died: 19 April 1885 (aged 70) Piazza Sant'Eustachio, Rome, Kingdom of Italy
- Buried: Campo Verano
- Parents: Nicola Lasagni; Carolina Toparin
- Motto: Benigno numine

Pietro Lasagni (June 15, 1814 – April 19, 1885) was an Italian cardinal.

He was born to Nicola Lasagni, Commander of the Sedentary National Guard, and his wife Carolina.

He was ordained a priest on 17 December 1836. Lasagni completed his doctorate in law in 1840 and then worked at the nuntiature of Paris from 1842 until 1851. He was an Apostolic delegate in Forlì from 1856 until 1859. Pope Pius IX named him secretary of the Sacred College of Cardinals and the conclave.

Pope Leo XIII created Lasagni a cardinal in the consistory of 13 December 1880.

He died in 1885 and was buried in his family's tomb, Campo Verano cemetery, Rome.

== Sources ==
- Biography by Salvador Miranda: The Cardinals of the Holy Roman Church
