= Luigi Macchi =

Italian Catholic Cardinal

His Eminence Luigi Macchi
- Cardinal Protodeacon
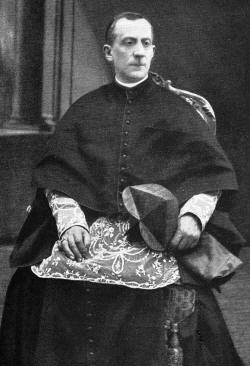
- Macchi in 1900.
- Church: Roman Catholic Church
- Appointed: 22 June 1896
- Term ended: 29 March 1907
- Predecessor: Isidoro Verga
- Successor: Andreas Steinhuber
- Other post: Cardinal-Deacon of Santa Maria in Via Lata (1896–1907)
- Previous post: Cardinal-Deacon of Santa Maria in Aquiro (1889–96)

Orders
- Ordination: 1859
- Created cardinal: 11 February 1889 by Pope Leo XIII
- Rank: Cardinal-Deacon

Personal details
- Born: Aloysius Macchi; 3 March 1832 Viterbo, Papal States
- Died: 29 March 1907 (aged 75) Rome, Kingdom of Italy
- Buried: Campo Verano
- Parents: Oreste Macchi; Veronica Cenci-Bolognetti
- Education: La Sapienza University
- Coat of arms

Aloysius "Luigi" Macchi (3 March 1832, in Viterbo – 29 March 1907, in Rome) was an Italian Catholic nobleman and a Cardinal.

He was a nephew of Cardinal Vincenzo Macchi. In 1859, he was ordained a priest. In 1860, he was referendary of the Tribunal of the Apostolic Signature of Grace. Pope Leo XIII created him a cardinal in the consistory of 11 February 1889. As cardinal protodeacon since 1899, Cardinal Macchi announced the election of cardinal Giuseppe Sarto as Pope Pius X at the end of the 1903 conclave and crowned him on 9 August 1903. Four years later, Cardinal Macchi died after an illness at the age of 75.

Catholic Church titles
| Preceded by Isidoro Verga | Cardinal-Deacon of Santa Maria in Via Lata; 1896–1907 | Succeeded by Louis Billot, S.J |
| Preceded by Teodolfo Mertel | Cardinal Protodeacon; 1899–1907 | Succeeded by Andreas Steinhuber, S.J. |
