= Tommaso Riario Sforza =

Neapolitan Cardinal

His Eminence Tommaso Riario Sforza
- Camerlengo
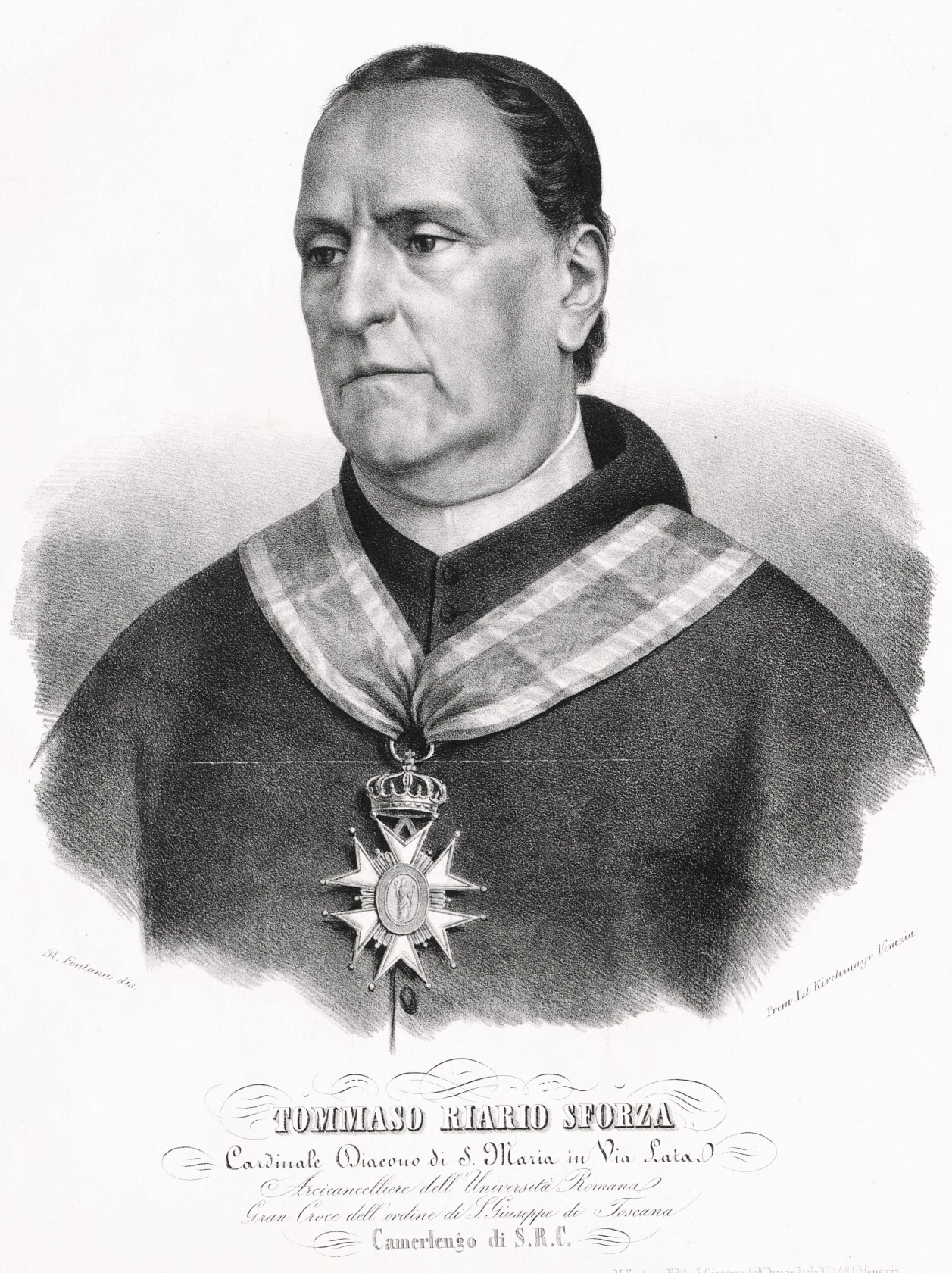
- Church: Roman Catholic Church
- Appointed: 3 April 1843
- Term ended: 14 March 1857
- Predecessor: Giacomo Giustiniani
- Successor: Lodovico Altieri
- Other posts: Cardinal-Deacon of Santa Maria in Via Lata (1834–57); Protodeacon (1842–57)
- Previous posts: Cardinal-Deacon of San Giorgio in Velabro (1823); Cardinal-Deacon of Santa Maria in Domnica (1823–37); Camerlengo of the College of Cardinals (1828–30); Prefect of the Congregation of Good Government (1843)

Orders
- Ordination: 28 September 1823
- Created cardinal: 10 March 1823 by Pope Pius VII
- Rank: Cardinal-Deacon

Personal details
- Born: Tommaso Riario Sforza; 8 January 1782 Naples, Kingdom of Naples
- Died: March 14, 1857 (aged 75) Rome, Papal States
- Buried: Santi XII Apostoli
- Parents: Nicola Riario Sforza; Giovanna Di Somma
- Coat of arms

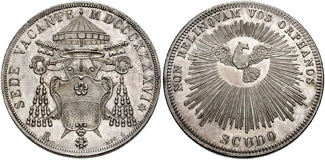
Sede vacante
SEDE VACANTE MDCCCXXXXVI, Riario Sforza coat-of-arms	NON RELINQVAM VOS ORPHANOS, SCUDO in exergue, radiate dove flying.
AR Scudo (26.98 g). Dated 1846.

Coat of arms of Tommaso Riario Sforza

Tommaso Riario Sforza (8 January 1782 in Naples – 14 March 1857 in Rome) was the Neapolitan Cardinal who, as protodeacon, announced at the end of the 1846 conclave the election of Cardinal Giovanni Mastai-Ferretti as Pope Pius IX.

He was the son of Duke Nicola Riario Sforza and Princess Giovanna Di Somma. Cardinal Sisto Riario Sforza (1810–1877) was a nephew of his, and Cardinals Pietro Riario, O.F.M. (1445–1474), Raffaele Riario (1461–1521) and Alessandro Riario (1542–1585) were of the same family. Also Girolamo Riario and Caterina Sforza were of the same family.

After serving as an official in the civil administration of the Papal States from 19 April 1804 onward, he was made a cardinal deacon in the consistory of 10 March 1823 and was assigned the deaconry of San Giorgio in Velabro.

After participating in the conclave of 1823, which elected Pope Leo XII, he was ordained a priest on 28 September 1823 and opted for the deaconry of Santa Maria in Domnica on 17 November of the same year. and on 19 December 1834 changed that to the deaconry of Santa Maria in Via Lata.

In the following years he received several successive appointments in the financial administration of the Papal States and was Camerlengo of the Sacred College of Cardinals from 1828 to 1830 and Camerlengo of the Holy Roman Church from 3 April 1843 until his death.

During the sede vacante of 1846, his coat-of-arms, as that of the Camerlengo of the Holy Roman Church, appeared on the coins that were issued. Because he was also Protodeacon, the senior Cardinal Deacon, he made the announcement of the election of Pope Pius IX on 16 June 1846.

He died on 14 March 1857, the last surviving cardinal appointed by Pope Pius VII. Pope Pius IX participated in his funeral in the basilica of Santi Apostoli, where he is buried.
