= Allumiere =

- Comune
- Comune di Allumiere
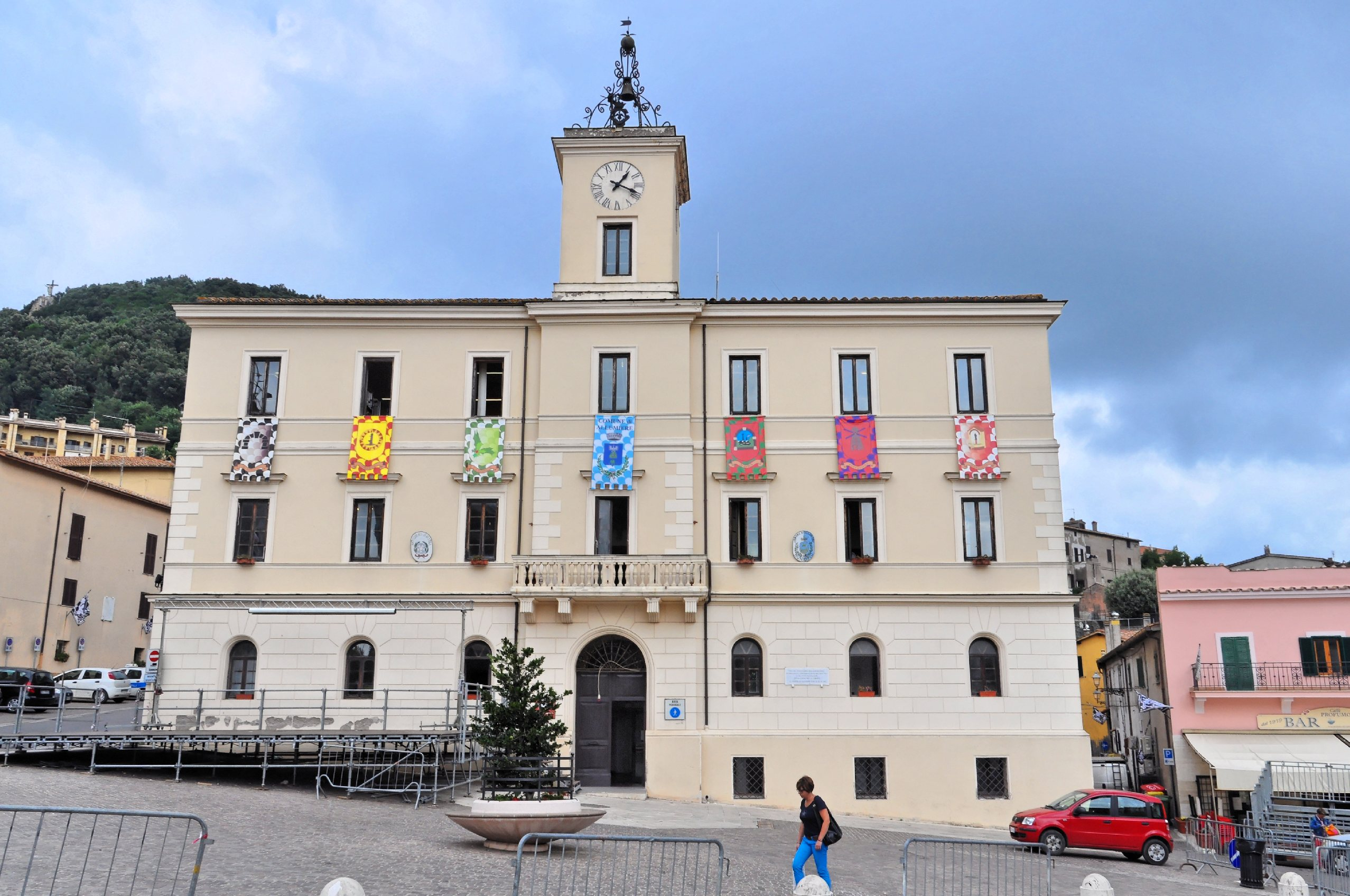
- Allumiere City Hall

- Coat of arms

- Location of Allumiere in Italy Allumiere (Lazio)
- Coordinates: 42°9′N 11°54′E
- Country: Italy
- Region: Lazio
- Metropolitan city: Rome (RM)

Government
  - Mayor: Augusto Battilocchio

Area
  - Total: 92.2 km^{2} (35.6 sq mi)
- Elevation: 522 m (1,713 ft)

Population (31 December 2014)
  - Total: 4,059
  - Density: 44.0/km^{2} (114/sq mi)
- Demonym: Allumieraschi
- Time zone: UTC+1 (CET)
  - Summer (DST): UTC+2 (CEST)
- Postal code: 00051
- Dialing code: 0766
- Patron saint: St. Mary of Graces(Madonna delle Grazie)
- Saint day: September 8
- Website: Official website

Allumiere (Romanesco: La Lumiera) is a comune (municipality) in the Metropolitan City of Rome in the Italian region of Latium, located about 60 kilometres (37 mi) northwest of Rome.

Allumiere is traditionally divided into the contrade of Burò, Ghetto, La Bianca, Nona, Polveriera, and Sant'Antonio.

== History ==
Although evidence of human settlements in the local area date back to the Neolithic age, the origins of the modern town of Allumiere are relatively recent. Allumiere was founded in the late 15th century to house the workers and the administrators of the important mines of alunite of the nearby Monti della Tolfa range. The exploitation lasted until 1941. The mines in question were found shortly after the fall of the Eastern Roman Empire (1453). Before that date, the State of the Church used to buy alunite from there, but following the Turkish conquest, they had to find alternatives.

== Main sights ==
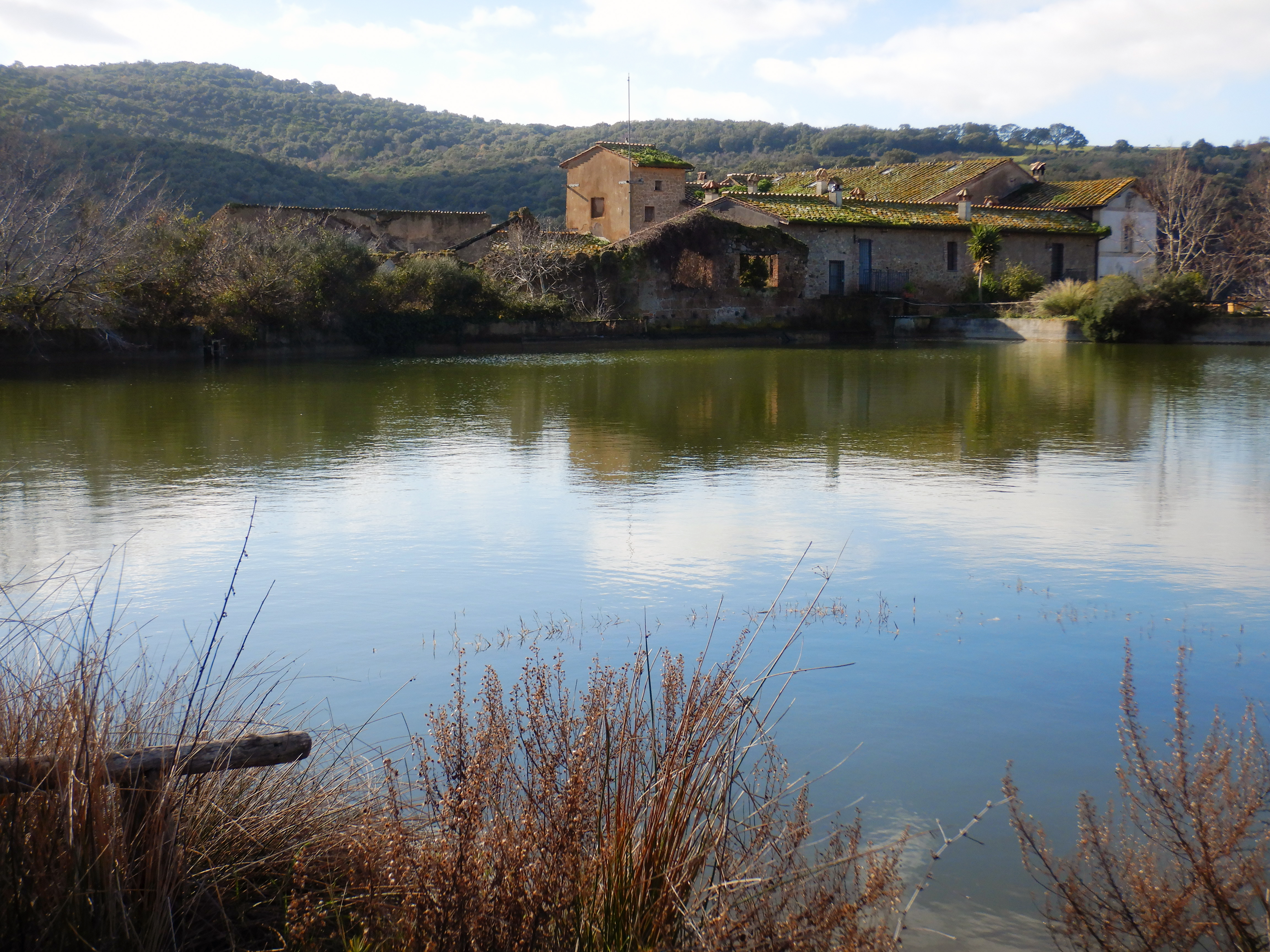
Borgo della Farnesiana

- Parish Church of St. Mary's Assumption (Santa Maria Assunta in Cielo) is the main church in Allumiere. It is located in the central square, in front of the town hall.
- Borgo della Farnesiana is a settlement built in the 16th century to service the mining industry: today is a semi-abandoned frazione in the Municipality of Allumiere.
- The Neo-Gothic Church of Maria Santissima alla mola della Farnesiana, which dates back to 1850. In the nearby are located an old mill and an old public oven.

== Twin towns ==
- Puçol, Spain
- Deutschkreutz, Austria
- Eglfing, Germany
