= Protodeacon =

Religious title derived from ancient Greek

Protodeacon derives from the Greek proto- meaning 'first' and diakonos, which is a standard ancient Greek word meaning "assistant", "servant", or "waiting-man". The word in English may refer to any of various clergy, depending upon the usage of the particular church in question.

== Eastern Orthodox and Eastern Catholic churches ==
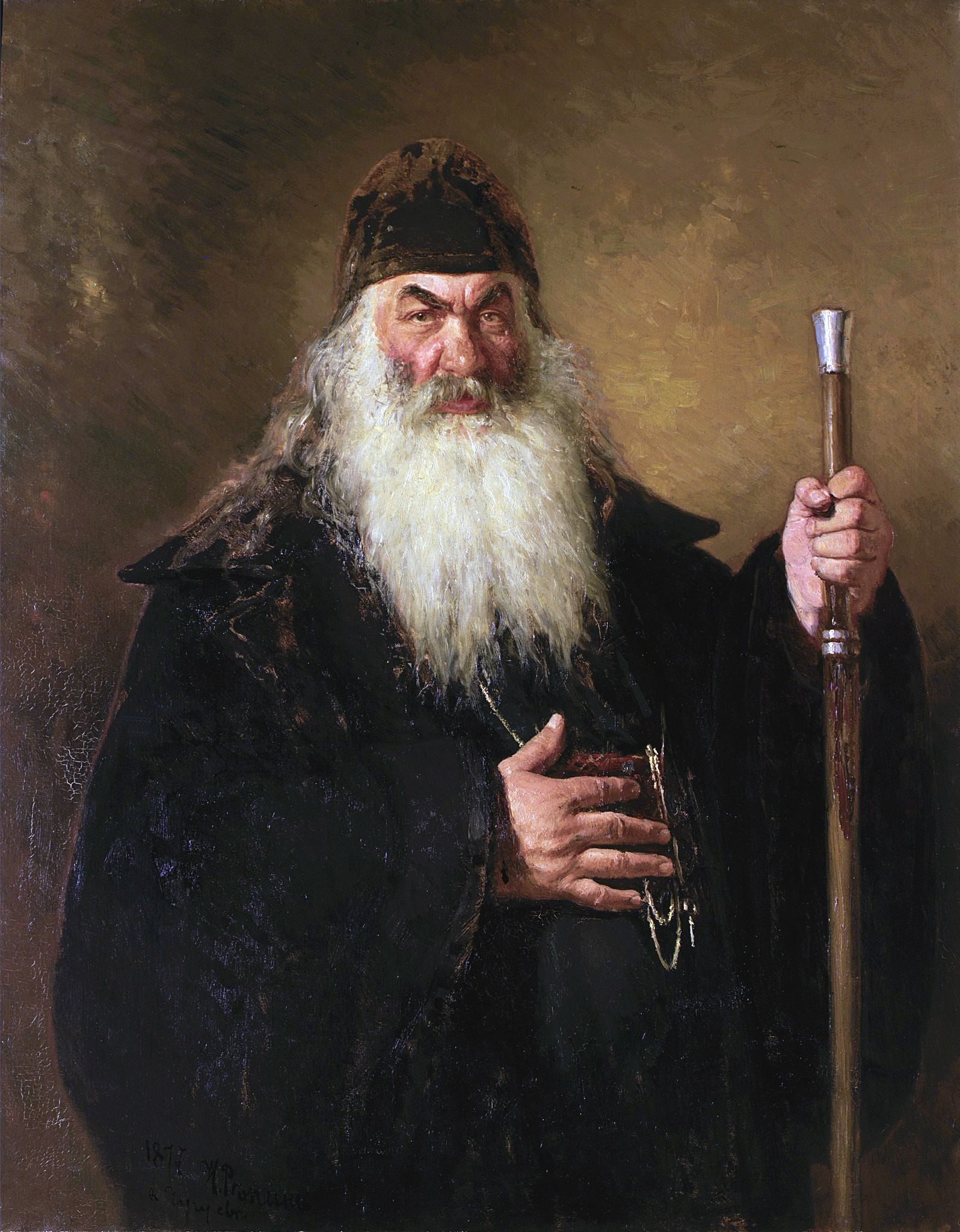
Portrait of an Orthodox protodeacon wearing the distinctive burgundy skufia, by Ilya Repin, 1877 (Tretyakov Gallery, Moscow).

Protodeacon is an honorific rank given to certain married deacons in Eastern Christian churches. In the Russian Orthodox Church it is an honorary title given to married deacons, as a mark of which, the clergyman is entitled to wear a burgundy-colored skufia. The equivalent rank for hierodeacons—i.e., monastic deacons—is archdeacon. The senior deacon of a cathedral or principal church may be awarded the title of protodeacon. In the Greek usage, the chief deacon who is attached to the person of a bishop is called an archdeacon. In the Slavic usage a protodeacon or archdeacon wears a distinctive orarion (deacon's stole).

The title of protodeacon is an award, not a distinctive order of ministry; so while a man may be ordained a deacon, he is said to be 'elevated' to the rank of protodeacon. This elevation may be awarded only by the deacon's own ruling bishop. The rite of elevation is identical for both a protodeacon and an archdeacon, and is normally done during the Little Entrance of the Divine Liturgy.

A protodeacon has precedence when serving with other deacons, regardless of the date of his own ordination to the diaconate. If several protodeacons serve at the same time, their order of precedence is determined by the date of their elevation.

In the Archieratikon (Slavonic: Chinovnik), the liturgical book containing the services as celebrated by a bishop, the term Protodeacon is used to refer to the senior-ranking deacon who is serving, regardless of whether or not he has actually had that rank bestowed upon him.

== Latin Church ==
In the Roman rite, the senior Cardinal Deacon is the Cardinal Protodeacon of the Holy Roman Church. He has the privilege of announcing the new pope's election and name (once he has been ordained to the episcopate) in the Habemus Papam announcement given from the central balcony at St. Peter's Basilica in Vatican City State. In the past, during papal coronations, the Protodeacon also had the honor of bestowing the pallium on the new pope and crowning him with the papal tiara. However, in 1978 Pope John Paul I chose not to be crowned and opted for a simpler papal inauguration ceremony, and his successors have followed that example. As a result, the Cardinal Protodeacon's privilege of crowning a new pope is dormant. However, the Protodeacon still has the privilege of bestowing the pallium on a new pope at his papal inauguration. "Acting in the place of the Roman Pontiff, he also confers the pallium upon metropolitan bishops or gives the pallium to their proxies." The current Cardinal Protodeacon is Dominique Mamberti.
