= Cardinals created by Adrian IV =

Catholic appointments from 1155 to 1159

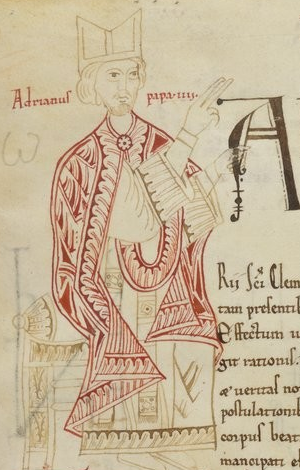
Pope Adrian IV.

Pope Adrian IV (r. 1154–59) created 23 cardinals in three consistories held during his pontificate. This included his future successor Pope Gregory VIII in 1155.

This was a period when relations between the Papacy and the Empire were extremely tense.

The Papal Consistory (consistorium, or assembly place) was a public court at which the Pope, in a gathering of the Cardinals and with their verbal input, appointed new Cardinals and bestowed their Red Hat. Other purposes of a consistory were the receiving of foreign ambassadors and heads of state. Not to be confused with a Papal Conclave, the meeting of Cardinals at which they elect a new Pope.

The Papal Conclave that convened after Adrian's death in 1159 was divided into two factions. One, the Imperial party, supported an alliance with the Emperor, while the other, the Cicilian party, favoured alignment with William King of Sicily. The Emperor professed to be neutral during this election, but when two clear rivals for the Papal throne emerged—later Alexander III and, later Victor IV—Frederick summoned a council to Pavia to decide between the claimants in 1160. "It was no surprise", says historian Ian Robinson, when the synod declared for Victor.

Image	Name	Birth	Appointment and tenure	Original titular church	Notes
(Note: From the Liber ad honorem Augusti by Peter of Eboli in 1196)	Hubald Allocingoli	1100, Lucca	1158—1181	Cardinal-Bishop of Ostia and Velletri	A former Cistercian, he had been Cardinal deacon of Sant'Adriano al Foro between 1138—1141 and Cardinal priest of Santa Prassede from 1141 to his appointment as Cardinal bishop. Elected Pope as Lucius III in 1181, he was much occupied by the continuing struggle with the Empire. He was a leading negotiatior of the Treaty of Benevento and as one of Alexander's clisest advisors, at the Treaty of Venice. In 1184 he promulgated the decretal Ad abolendam, "to abolish diverse malignant heresies". He died in Verona on 25 November 1185, having spent most of his reign away from Rome, having been expelled by a mob. Thomas Becket considered him one of only two Cardinals to be unbribable; a modern biographer has described him as "elderly, honest ... well-meaning, but weak".
	Giovanni Pizzuti	Unknown date, Naples	1155—1182	Cardinal-deacon of Santa Maria Nuova	Originally a Canon regular of Saint-Victor of Paris.
	Boso	Unknown date, Tuscany (Note: Originally thought to have been English, he was more likely born in Lucca or Pisa.)	1156–c.1178	Cardinal-deacon of Santi Cosma e Damiano	Traditionally believed to have been the nephew of Adrian, this has now been refuted in modern scholarship. It is possible however that Boso accompanied Adrian on his mission to Scandinavia between 1152 and 1154, and it ios known that he was a firm supporter of Thomas Becket during the latter's dispute with King Henry II of England. Adrian appointed Boso Papal Chamberlain, or camerarius, in 1157, a move that greatly improved the Papacy's finances by streamlining its financial bureaucracy. Boso was both the Pope's friend and personal biographer, and on Adrian's death in 1159, he worked to win support for a successor who would continue Adrian's policies, especially defending the Papacy against both Frederick Barbarossa and William I of Sicily, who had invaded the Papal patrimony. (Note: During this period, the Norman Kingdom of Sicily comprised not just the island of Sicily, but most of Southern Italy—Apulia, Calabria and Longobardia—and Malta. Both the Papacy and the Holy Roman Empire claimed the region.)
	Ardicio Rivoltella	Unknown date, Platina	1156-1186	Cardinal Deacon of San Teodoro	Appointed Cardinal on 21 December 1156. Adrian's death led to a disputed Papal election, and one of the candidates, Roland, dispatched Ardicio to Constantinople to win Emperor Manuel I Komnenos's support against his rival, Octavian. This was successful, and Roland was elected Pope Alexander III.
	Bonadies de Bonadie	Unknown date, Unknown location	1155/5–1158	Cardinal Deacon of Sant'Angelo in Pescheria	Elected Cardinal deacon of Sant'Angelo no later than 2 December 1456, which he held for three years before opting for the office of Cardinal Priest of San Crisogono (Note: Occasionally Grisogonus.) on 24 September 1158. (Note: Opting (optione) was a mechanism by which a Cardinal deacon could gain promotion to Cardinal priest, and thence to cardinal bishop. According the historian Arnold Witte, "although the ceremonies suggested a cardinal should remain 'faithful' to his title or deaconry this was hardly the case—indeed, cardinals who never changed churches were the exception not the rule".) He is signatory to several Bulla during Adrian's pontificate. During the disputed election of 1159 he appears to have sided with Roland, although one contemporary soiurces states that, when asked who to pay homage to—at a time when Victor seemed likely to win—Bonadie said "Ite ad eum sicut alii ("go to him like the others"). He probably died in 1161 on a diplomatic mission—on which details are scarce—to Manuel I.
(Note: Portrait of Gregory VIII in the Basilica of Saint Paul Outside the Walls, Rome. Above the columns of the aisles runs a band with 265 medallions depicting the popes from St. Peter to the present day. Originally painted, they were redone in mosaic in 1847 after the fire of 1823, which seriously damaged the Basilica. The portraits of the most ancient popes are of hypothetical—generally represented as bearded, elderly men—and only from the Renaissance period did they become more reliable physiognomic representations.)	Alberto di Morra	c.1105xc.1110, Benevento	–1187	Cardinal Deacon of Sant'Adriano al Foro, Cardinal priest of San Lorenzo in Lucina	A southern Italian, di Morra (Note: Not to be confused with Antipope Gregory VIII, who reigned, disputedly, in absentia from 1118–1121.) was a magister, trained in law, and with a distinguished reputation: "no one knows the customs and rights of the Roman church as he does", reported Cardinal Henry of Albano in 1187. In 1156 Adrian appointed him Cardinal deacon of Sant'Adriano al Foro, followed two years later by promotion to San Lorenzo in Lucina. Originally a Premonstratensian canon of St Martin, Laon before becoming an "extremely active" Papal legate, visiting Germany, Dalmatia, Hungary, Spain and Portugal. He was also the chief Papal negotiator to the court of Henry II of England to oversee the King's reconciliation to the church after Becket's murder. He was Papal Chancellor under Popes Lucius III, Urban III and Alexander III, and one of their most influential advisors. He was elected Pope Gregory VIII in 1187. Although he was able to promulgate an encyclical—Audita tremendi—launching the Third Crusade (Note: Sultan Saladin had captured Jerusalem three weeks before Gregory's election; it was said that his predecessor, Urban III, had died of grief at the news.) and issue eight decretals during his pontificate, (Note: Indeed, it was Gregory who began the practice legal codification through use of decretals.) he died after only 57 days in office, never having set foot in Rome.
	William of Pavia	Before 1128, Pavia	1158–1176	Cardinal Priest of San Pietro in Vincoli	Nothing is known of William's upbringing or early life. Possibly a monk at Clairvaux Abbey, although on sparse evidence, he became Archdeacon of Pavia and then Cardinal deacon of St Mary in Via Lata. Appointed Cardinal 14 March 1158, and was sent on an embassy by Adrian to Barbarossa the following year. He helped engineer Alexander's election in 1159. attended the Council of Pavia in February 1160, and in the same year he issued Papal approval for the marriage between Henry's son, and namesake to Margaret of France. At the Synod of Beauvais he proved himself "an eloquent and resolute defender" of Alexander. Appointed Legate to Aquitaine between 1161 and 1162 for the purpose of arbitrating local conflicts. He was the Pope's envoy to Becket in France, whence he had fled following the breakdown of relations between him and Henry II of England in 1167. Henry also selected William as his choice of Legate in 1170, with whom William had previously been on good terms; he was also friends with Becket. He opted for Cardinal Bishop of Porto in December 1176, making him the only one of Adrian's cardinmals to attain this rank. He died in Aversa on 18 January 1178.
	Guido	Unknown date, unknown location	1157–?	Cardinal deacon of Santa Maria in Aquiro	Appointed 13 June 1157.
	Cinzio (occasionally Cinthius or Hyacinth) Capellus/Carellus	Early 12th century, unknown location	1158–1182	Cardinal Deacon of Sant'Adriano al Foro	Nothing is known of Cinzio's upbringing or early life. Although he has traditionally been connected to the powerful Papareschi family—from which Pope Innocent II and several Cardinal-nephews came—this is no longer supported by modern scholarship. Appointed Cardinal-deacon of Sant'Adriano al Foro in March 1158, he succeeded Alberto da Morro. He was a regular signatory to Papal documents through the remainder of Adrian's reign, suggesting he was in constant attendance on the Pope, notwithstanding the peripatetic nature of the latter's court. Following Adrian's death, it appears Cinzio was to ill to take part in the disputed conclave of 1159, and it is unknown as to which—if either—of the candidates he favoured. He appears to have spent much of Alexander's pontificate performing routine administrative tasks, such as auditing church lands, although he also attended in Imperial assemblies. In 1178 Cinxio was appointed Cardinal priest of Santa Cecilia in Trastevere. Now an old man, one of his final known acts was to participate in the September 1181 which saw the election of Lucius III, and he was likely dead by the end of the next year.
	Pietro di Miso	Unknown date, unknown location	1158–	Cardinal Deacon of St Eustace	Nothing is known of Pietro di Miso's upbringing or early life, although it has been hypothesised that he was connected to Alessio, later Cardinal priest of Santa Susanna, Rome from 1188 to 1189. He is known to have studied in France, and had links to several major French abbeys including Saint-Denis, Compiègne and Lagny. Appointed Cardinal deacon of St Eustace in March 1158; on Adrian's death, he supported Alexander's candidacy to succeed him. At the beginning of the next pontificate, he embarked to Hungary where, after complicated negotiations, he successfully gained the support of King Géza for Alexander. He attended the Council of Tours in 1163 and the following year was promoted to Cardinal priest of San Lorenzo in Damaso. Pietro is known to have been popular with Henry II of England, who regularly employed him on business in the Curia; he likewise maintained cordial relations with Thomas Becket. Pietro died on 14 September 1174.
	Raymond des Arènes	Unknown date, Nîmes	1158–	Cardinal deacon of St Mary in Via Lata	Adrian's legate to Spain. During the disputed election of 1159 he supported the Imperial candidate Ottaviano Crescenzi Ottaviani, who took the Papal name of Victor IV. Raymond took part in the Synod of Pavia in 1160, which anathamatised Alexander. However around 1162 he seems to have transferred allegiance to Alexander; he is not known to have signed any documents under Victor. By the time of his appointment, Raymond was a well-known lawyer, or jurisperitus, with an established career under Adrian's predecessors; likwise, his glossess on the Decretum Gratiani were widely circulated. (Note: This reflected a trend of Adrian towards appointing men of "experience, academic learning and administrative and diplomatic skill", argues Anne J. Duggan, which in turn reflects the wisdom of the appointer.) He worked with Boso to receive the donatum of Corchiano from its lord, Gaito Boccaleone, for the Papal patrimony.
	Giovanni d'Anagni	Early-mid 12th century, Anagni, Lazio		Cardinal deacon of Santa Maria in Portico (1158–1167); Cardinal priest of San Marco (1168–90)	Giovanni was born into the powerful Anagni family of the Counts of Segni around the first quarter of the 12th century. (Note: The wealthy and politically powerful Conti family produced three 13th-century Popes—Innocent III (1198), Gregory IX (1227) and Alexander IV (1254)—as well as several Cardinals.) A member of the Anagni Cathedral chapter, Adrian appointed Giovanni Cardinal deacon of Santa Maria in Portico in 1159, and later that year Giovanni took part in the disputed Papal election, where he supported Alexander III. The new pope appointed Giovanni legate to Lombardy. Soon after, he was excommunicated by the Antipope Victor IV; in response, Giovanni excommunicated both Victor and the Emperor Frederick. Journeyed to Dalmatia via Apulia 1163x1164. Around three years later, Giovanmni was elevated to the presbyteral office of Cardinal priest of San Marco and became heavily involved in Curial affairs. However, he was still sent on occasional embassies, such as to Germany in 1183 by Lucius III and to France by Clement III six years later as part of the Papal effort to resolve the deadlock between Henry, King of England and Philip II Augustus of France, during which Giovanni threatened to place France under Interdict. In response, when Henry's son Richard—who supported Philip against his father—succeeded to the English throne the following year, Giovanni found himself forbidden to enter England. In recognition of his service, Clement appointed him Cardinal bishop of Praeneste in August 1190. Now elderly, his work was confined to the Curial court. He disappears from the records after March 1196, during the pontificate of Celestine III, presumably dying not long after.
	Simeone Borrelli		1158—	Cardinal deacon of Santa Maria in Domnica.	Possibly the son of Burellus de Sangro. He was a monk at Monte Cassino Abbey and later Abbot of Subiaco. His promotion was a reflection of the importance Popes saw an alliance with Monte Casino in maintaining Papal influence in southern Italy. (Note: And not just Simon. Other Monte Cassini monks elevated to Cardinalates were Rainald by Innocent II, Roger by Alexander III, John by Clement III and Abbot Roffred by Celestine III.) Sometime between 1155 and 1158 Simeone was appointed Rector of Campania, an office dedicated to organising the Pope's journeys south at a politically decisive time in relations between the Papacy and Sicilly. Simeone was promoted to Cardinal deacon of Santa Maria in Domnica by Adrian in 1158, but during the next year's disputed election he supported Victor IV. As a result, he was expelled from Subiaco that year. He subsequently regained his abbacy in 1167, and appears to have died towards the end of 1182.
	Guy, or Guido, of Crema	Late 11th/early 12th century, Crema, Lombardy	c.1145–1164	Cardinal priest of Santa Maria in Trastevere	From an aristocratic background, Guy had been in Papal service since the pontificate of Innocent II; he signed his first extant Papal privilege in 1145. He continued in Curial employment under Popes Eugene III and Anastasius IV. He may have been the nephew of an important cardinal of Calixtus II, Giovanni, who was related to the Counts of Camisano, feudal lords of Crema. He was known for diplomatic skill as a legate, particularly in negotiating with the Emperor. Originally Cardinal deacon of San Maria in Porticu (1145–1158), in 1158 Adrian promoted him to Cardinal priest of Santa Maria in Trastevere, in spite of Guy being connected to Cardinal Octavian, leader of the pro-Imperial faction and later Antipope, whose election Guy supported in 1159. On the death of Victor IV in 1164 Guy was elected Antipope Paschal III, albeit with much less support than his predecessor; the continuing Schism was unpopular and even many Imperial churchmen, such as Archbishops Conrad of Mainz and Hillin of Trier, returned their allegiance to Alexander. His credibility was further damaged by the wholly uncanonical nature of his election, (Note: He was elected only by five people: two Victorine cardinals, two German bishops, and the prefect of Rome.) and he never received universal recognition. One of the few important acts of his pontificate was his 1165 canonisation of Charlemagne, an attempt to woo the Emperor's political support, and his crowning of Frederick and the Empress Beatrice on 1 August 1167. However, Paschal's influence remained marginal and by 1167 even Frederick was proposing both Paschal and Alexander resign in favour of a unity candidate, although this was rendered moot by Paschal's death in Rome, 20 September 1169, before the election could take place.
	Pietro	Unknown date, Unknown location	1159–	Cardinal priest of Santa Cecilia in Trastevere	
	Walter		8 February 1159 – 6 August 1177	Cardinal bishop of Albano	Very little is known. Also an Englishman, a protégé of Adrian's who elevated to his own previous See; he was sympathetic to Adrian's Sicilian strategy against the Emperor. Originally a canon regular at the Abbey of Saint-Ruf, Avignon. Had a "distinguished" 20-year career in the Curia, and was a personal friend of both Thomas Becket and John of Salisbury. Although the dater of his death is unknown, it was before the Lateran Council of 1179, by which time Henry of Clairvaux had been appointed to the See.
