= Pope Adrian IV =

Head of the Catholic Church from 1154 to 1159

- Bishop of Rome
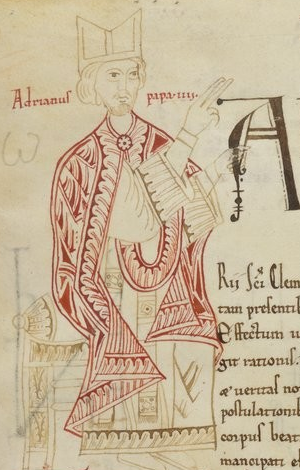
- Adrian IV depicted in the Chronicle of Casauria, second half of the 12th century
- Church: Catholic Church
- Papacy began: 4 December 1154
- Papacy ended: 1 September 1159
- Predecessor: Anastasius IV
- Successor: Alexander III

Orders
- Created cardinal: 1146 by Eugene III

Personal details
- Born: Nicholas Breakspear c. 1100 Abbots Langley, Hertfordshire, England
- Died: 1 September 1159 (aged 58–59) Anagni, Papal States, Holy Roman Empire

Pope Adrian (or Hadrian) IV (Latin: Hadrianus IV; born Nicholas Breakspear (or Brekespear); c. 1100 (Note: The historian R. L. Poole speculates that Adrian may have been born many years later, as he was sent on a lengthy trip to Scandinavia in 1152, and, says Poole, "so onerous a task would hardly have been imposed on a man past middle age".) – 1 September 1159) was head of the Catholic Church and ruler of the Papal States from 4 December 1154 until his death in 1159. He is the only pope to have been born in England and the first of two from an English-speaking country, alongside Pope Leo XIV.

Adrian was born in Hertfordshire, England, but little is known of his early life. Although he does not appear to have received a great degree of schooling, while still a youth he travelled to the south of France where he was schooled in Arles, studying law. He then travelled to Avignon, where he joined the Abbey of Saint-Ruf. There he became a canon regular and was eventually appointed abbot. He travelled to Rome several times, where he appears to have caught the attention of Pope Eugene III, and was sent on a mission to Catalonia where the Reconquista was attempting to reclaim land from the Muslim Al-Andalus. Around this time his abbey complained to Eugene that Breakspear was too heavy a disciplinarian, and in order to make use of him as a papal legate as well as to pacify his monks, he was appointed Bishop of Albano some time around 1149.

As bishop, Breakspear was soon sent on another diplomatic mission, this time to Scandinavia. At the outset of the Civil war era in Norway, Breakspear reorganised the Church in Norway and then moved on to Sweden. Here, he was very much acclaimed by the people, and when he left, chroniclers called him a saint. Breakspear returned to Rome in 1154; Eugene's successor Pope Anastasius IV had died only a few weeks previously.

For reasons now unknown, but possibly at his predecessor's request, Breakspear was elected next pope by the cardinals. He was unable to complete his coronation service, however, because of the perilous state of politics in Rome, which also at the time was considered a den for 'heresy' and republicanism. Adrian decisively restored the papal authority there, but his other major policy issue—relations with the newly crowned Holy Roman emperor, Frederick I—started off badly and got progressively worse. Each party, as a result of a particular aggravating incident, found something to condemn the other for. As a result, Adrian entered into an alliance with the Byzantine emperor, Manuel I Komnenos, who was keen to re-assert his authority in the south of Italy, but was unable to do so due to the Norman kings' occupation of the region, now under William I of Sicily.

Adrian's alliance with the Byzantine emperor came to nothing, as William decisively defeated Manuel and forced Adrian to come to terms at the Treaty of Benevento. This alienated Emperor Frederick even more, as he saw it as a repudiation of their existing treaty. Relations soured further when Frederick laid claim to a large swathe of territory in northern Italy. Adrian's relations with his country of birth, however, seem to have remained generally good. Certainly, he showered St Albans Abbey with privileges, and he appears to have forwarded King Henry II's policies where he could. Most famously, in 1158 Adrian is supposed to have granted Henry the papal bull Laudabiliter, which is thought to have authorised Henry to invade Ireland. Henry did not do so, however, for another 14 years, and scholars are uncertain whether the bull ever existed.

Following Adrian's death at Anagni, there was uncertainty as to who to succeed him, with both pro- and anti-imperial cardinals voting for different candidates. Although Pope Alexander III officially took over, the subsequent election of antipope Victor IV led to a 22-year-long schism. Scholars have debated Adrian's pontificate widely. Much of a positive nature—his building program and reorganisation of papal finances, for example—has been identified, particularly in the context of such a short reign. He was also up against powerful forces out of his control, which, while he never overcame them, he managed effectively.

== Early life ==
The son of Richard Breakspear, his family was a relatively humble one. The exact year of his birth is unknown but he was probably around 55 years old on his election. Little is known (Note: The only reliable source closest to his own life is that by Cardinal Boso in the Liber Pontificalis, but, comments Brooke, "this is exceedingly terse on his early life", noting only his nationality and voyage to France for learning.) of his background, and that which is, comments Brooke, "savour[s] of gossip rather than sober history." He was probably born in or around the Hertfordshire town of St Albans. As a result, much of that is thought to be known may well be mythological "tradition woven at the great abbey" there. Much of what is known is brought to historians by the writings of Cardinal Boso and William of Newburgh, both of whom were, however, writing over 30 years after Breakspear's death. As a result, notes Poole, there is a dearth of information—and especially dates—for Breakspear's life until his election as pope, and "all that can be said is that the dates commonly given are in every instance wrong". The English chronicler Matthew Paris says he came from Abbots Langley, although Paris mistakenly ascribes to his father the name Robert de Camera. Robert may have been a clerk (Note: Christopher Brooke also surmises that, with a surname such as "Camera", he was likely to have been a clerk.) although Sayers suggests that Paris' claim that Robert was a priest is probably correct, as is the likelihood that he later became a monk. (Note: Richard may have been a married priest, as, during his son's later struggle with the Holy Roman Emperor, the latter asserted it was the case as a slur. This was not unusual in the 12th-century church. The historian Anne Llewellyn Barstow says: "Despite six hundred years of decrees, canons, and increasingly harsh penalties, the Latin clergy still...lived with their wives and raised families. In practice, ordination was not an impediment to marriage; therefore some priests did marry even after ordination." The practice was generally confined to lower orders, such as subdeacons, however, it may be that de Camera was one such.) As such, there are grounds for believing Nicholas to have been illegitimate. Nicholas had a brother called either Ranulf or Randall, a clerk in Feering, Essex. Paris is also the source for Nicholas' surname being Breakspear.

Paris recounts a story that Nicholas was rejected by Abbot Robert de Gorron from taking his novitiate at the abbey, although as Poole points out, the story is demonstrably incorrect as Robert did not become abbot until 1151. Sayers, suggests that, true or not, during and after Breakspear's pontificate, "certainly St Albans fed upon the story of the local boy who had made good". William of Newburgh reports that Nicholas was too poor to receive anything more than a rudimentary education, and Brooke speculates that he travelled to France to learn the skills of a clerk. This was, he notes, a normal path to preferment in the 12th century, although it was more unusual for those that did so to have Breakspear's inauspicious background. He may have become a canon at the Augustinian priory in Merton, Surrey. Poole subscribes to this theory, citing a letter to Breakspear when pope in which he is reminded that "your worship was wont to speak" of Merton in conversation.

=== Move to France, promotion, mission to Catalonia ===
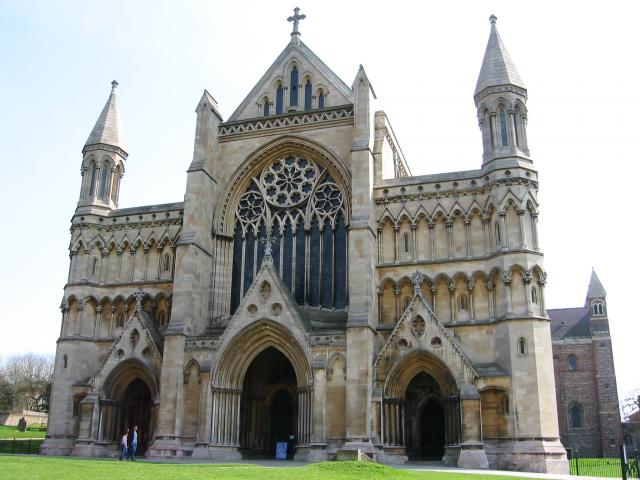
St Albans Abbey, now a Cathedral, pictured in 2005

The next point at which Breakspear can be positively identified is in the Southern French town of Arles, where he continued his studies in canon law, and probably under the masters of Roman law also. On completion of his studies he became a canon regular at the Abbey of Saint-Ruf in Avignon. (Note: In English, St Rufus, this was an important regional motherhouse.) He was soon appointed prior and then abbot of St Ruf, where the monks complained he was overly strict.

While at St Ruf, Breakspear attracted the attention of Pope Eugenius III. (Note: Eugenius may also have been an Anglophile, as it appears that he once told John of Salisbury "that he found the English admirably fitted to perform any task they turned their hand to, and thus to be preferred to all other races – except, he added, when frivolity got the better of them".) Around this time, Breakspear met John of Salisbury, who would become his good friend. Eugenius appointed Breakspear as Cardinal-Bishop of Albano, only the second time an Englishman had been promoted to that rank. (Note: The first had been the theologian Robert Pullen, to the Cardinalate of SS. Martino e Silvestro.) in which capacity he attended the Council of Reims in November 1148.

Eugenius selected Breakspear for a mission to Catalonia, (Note: The scholar Damian Smith notes a pre-existing connection between Breakspear and the region through his predecessor at St Ruf, Olegarius, abbot between 1113 and 1118, and who had then been unwillingly promoted to the Bishopric of Barcelona and subsequently the Archbishopric of Tarragona. He also became an important advisor to Ramon Berenguer IV, Count of Barcelona.) possibly as a kind of unofficial legate to the crusaders. He was likely present at the Siege of Lleida. Around mid-1152, he was despatched to Scandinavia as Papal legate.

=== Visit to Scandinavia, 1152 ===
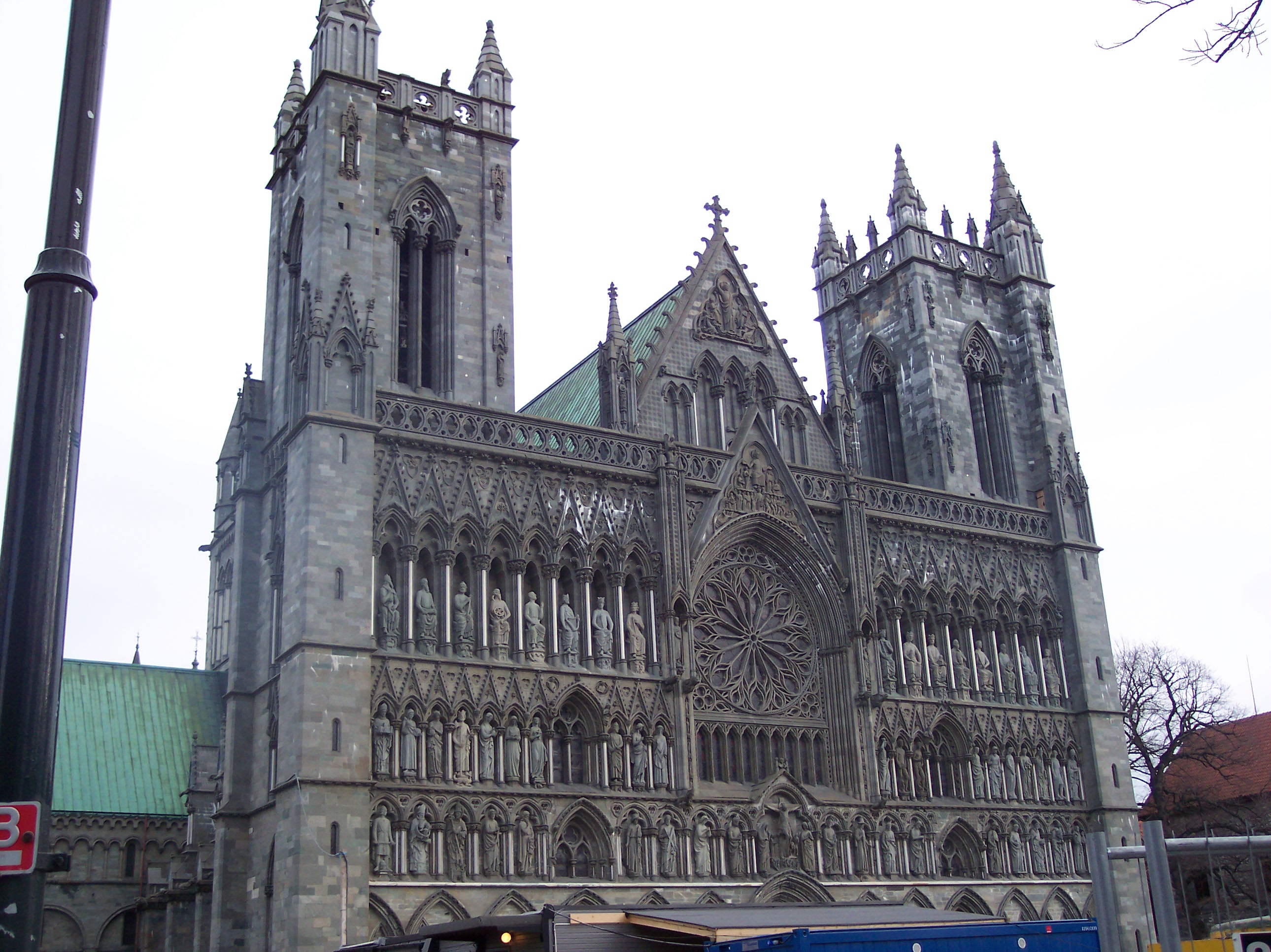
Trondheim Cathedral

Former Canon residentiary of St Albans Cathedral, Anders Bergquist has described Breakspear's journey to northern Europe as "one of the better documented" of his career. It is possible that Boso—from whom much of the information comes—was in his entourage, although this is not certain. On his arrival, Norway was in a state of civil war and the authority of the King, Inge I, was neither strong nor respected. Breakspear reconciled the warring factions—albeit temporarily—and restored the monarchy. Although no official record of his instructions survives, Bergquist suggests that they can be inferred from his actions: to divide the existing Archbishopric of Lund—which covered both Norway and Sweden–into two distinct national metropolitans, to arrange payment of Peter's Pence and to generally reorganise the church along Italian and European lines.

Breakspear may have travelled to Norway via France and England—where, Sayers speculates, he could have recruited merchant contacts who knew the region. His mission may have been kept quiet, as Bergquist notes his arrival seems to have been unexpected: Archbishop Eskil of Lund had recently left to visit France, and the King of Norway was on a military campaign. His first stop was Norway. At some point, Breakspear presided over a council at Nidaros. This council, says Robinson, "strengthened the economic position of the church and the social status of the clergy". Its timing though is difficult to ascertain, says Bergquist: Autumn 1152 seems to allow too little time to organise such a major council following his arrival, yet much later and the depth of a Norwegian winter is even more unlikely.

The focal point of the cult of St Olaf, Nidaros had until that point been only an episcopate. Adrian's council was intended to promulgate canons. To this end Breakspear made Nidaros a geographically extensive ecclesiastical province, covering the whole of Norway, Iceland and Greenland, as well as the Faroe, Orkney and Shetland Islands. Breakspear also authorised the expansion of what was to become Europe's most northerly medieval cathedral, and its largest. While in Norway he founded three cathedral schools, at Nidaros in 1152 and two more at Bergen and Hamar the following year. His work in Norway earned him the praise of contemporary Icelandic writer and politician, Snorri Sturluson.

If the Council of Nidaros was held in the early months of 1153, suggests Bergquist, then it appears that Breakspear sailed to Sweden as soon as it was concluded. His activities in Sweden followed a similar course to those in Norway. He called another council, this time at Linköping, which reorganised the Swedish church under the Archbishop of Lund (it had previously been subject to German patriarchy). He also received permission from the Swedish monarchy to introduce Peter's pence and to reduce the influence of the lay community on the church generally. His visit to Sweden was recorded by contemporary chroniclers and published in the 13th century. Similarly to what he had done in Norway with Trondheim, Adrian attempted to create an archiepiscopal see in Sweden. The Swedes and the Geats could not come into an agreement on the location of the see, and the venture came to nothing. According to Bergquist, Breakspear "was taken aback by this unseemly conflict, and declared that neither people deserved this highest ecclesiastical honour". Indeed, he suggests that it is possible that Breakspear's plans fell through thanks to the machinations of the recently returned Archbishop Eskil. Eskil, having discovered that he had lost half his archiepiscopate in his absence, may have stirred up the Swedes' and Geats' rivalries to ensure against losing any more. In the event, Breakspear appears to have repaired relations with Eskil, assuring him that Eskil would receive far more than he had lost. As a result, he placed Eskil in charge of the new Swedish metropolitan.

Duggan describes Adrian's legation in the north as a "diplomatic triumph", being so successful, says Sayers, "that he was later seen as the apostle of Scandinavia". Boso later lauded how Breakspear brought "peace to the kingdoms, law to the barbarians, tranquillity to the monasteries, order to the churches, discipline to the clergy and a people pleasing to God, devoted to good works". He successfully introduced a new Scandinavian tythe—the denarium sancti Petri, or payment to St Peter—a financial acknowledgement by the Scandinavian church of Papal primacy. Breakspear, argues the scholar Andrew Beck, "gave the Swedish church its hierarchy and its attachment to Rome". (Note: Breakspear was one of two English clerics who influenced Scandinavian Christianity at this time; the other was Henry, Bishop of Uppsala, who was originally from St Albans.) He left Scandinavia in autumn 1154; he seems to have left a generally good impression in the region: A later saga refers to Breakspear as "the good cardinal...now considered a saint". On his return to Rome he found Pope Eugenius had died the previous year, and that his successor had followed him only a few weeks before; the College of Cardinals was seeking a successor.

== Political background ==
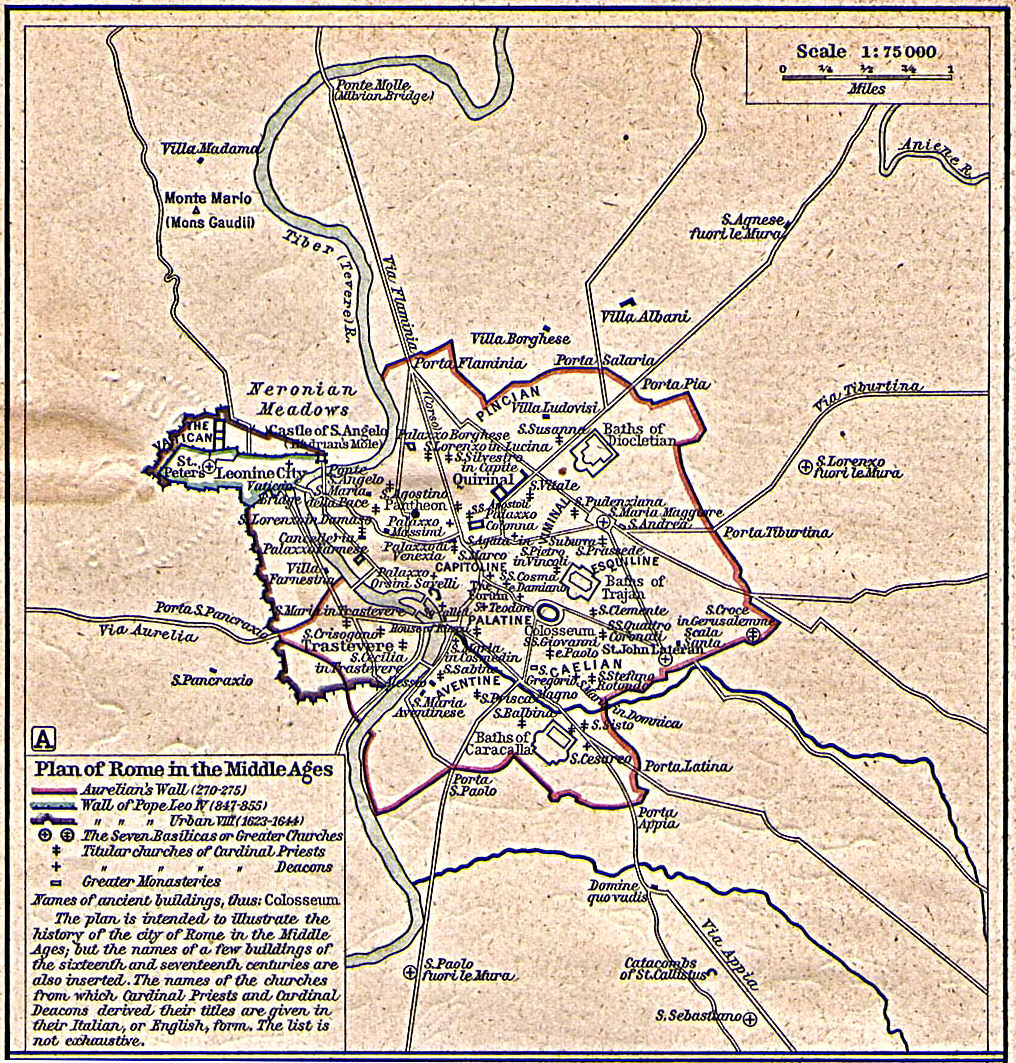
Medieval Rome; the Leonine City is to the northwest of the city, outside the Leonine Wall (in blue)

Discussing the broader political context of the time, the historian Anne Duggan argues that "the Pope was not master of his own house". Likewise, Walter Ullmann has argued that the age was a radical one, in which the temporal power—specifically, the "educated lay element"—was encroaching upon traditional spiritual realms.

The age in which Adrian took office was one that witnessed profound changes in all spheres of life, and change always brings in its train restlessness, crises, stress and tension, caused by the attempted displacement of the old by the new. New forces were released which had hitherto had no opportunity of asserting themselves and which challenged the traditional scheme of things vigorously.

Eugenius had died in July 1153. His successor, Anastasius IV, had been already elderly when elected to succeed him, and only ruled for a year. Comparing the two, the popular historian John Julius Norwich comments that the former "was old and ineffectual, concerned chiefly with his own self-glorification"; Adrian, though, was "a man of very different calibre". Anastasius died on 3 December 1154, and by which time, Breakspear had returned to Rome. Even before the death of Eugenius, argues Barber, "a new and formidable figure had appeared" on the political scene. The Hohenstaufen Frederick Barbarossa had been elected Holy Roman Emperor on 4 March 1152. Barbarossa and Eugenius had contracted, at the Treaty of Constance, to unite against both William of Sicily and the Roman Commune. (Note: However, the contemporary chronicler of 12th-century Popes Boso, noted that—notwithstanding the hostility of Rome to the Pope at this time—these elections were peaceful and unanimous, although Boso did describe the election of Eugenius III as taking place in "unexpected harmony". Sicily, a Papal fief in name only, provided its theoretical Papal lords with neither status nor income. Adrian's predecessor, Anastasia, had possessed a good grasp of the intricacies of Roman politics and had used his knowledge to maintain peaceful relations between all factions where possible.)

Ullmann has identified four major areas of concern for Adrian at the beginning of his pontificate: the city of Rome under Arnold of Brescia, the new emperor who was marching towards Rome for his coronation, his counterpart in the east whose army had recently invaded southern Italy, and restlessness among the Pope's own vassals in his patrimony. By the time of Adrian's consecration, the city of Rome was a major player in Papal-Aristocratic regional politics. Under the governance of a republican commune since 1144, Pope Eugenius had recognised it the following year. While the city was usually happy to acknowledge the feudal lordship of the Pope, it was—even compared to other Italian city states—both "unusually self-aware, and also unusually idiosyncratic" compared to others. (Note: The Roman commune's idiosyncrasies included creating its own minuscule script, a unique dating system and its own seal and chancery. Wickham calls the Roman project both radical and unparalleled.) The commune was hostile to the Papacy. The Papacy was weak in the city of Rome. The heretic, Arnold of Brescia, had ruled since 1146 and was popular. He also had the support of the Roman Commune. The popularity of Arnold directly translated into hostility towards the popes. Chichele Professor Chris Wickham describes the relationship between the Pope and the lords of his Patrimony as one in which, because "their lords did not by any means all look to Rome [they] had to be coaxed back or brought back by force". Papal politics was beset by problems at home and abroad. The election of Adrian IV as Pope, comments the papal scholar Ian S. Robinson—and, indeed, the elections of his immediate predecessors—"took place in the shadow of the communal revolution in Rome". (Note: A student of Abelard's at the cathedral school of Notre-Dame de Paris, Arnold has been described by the ecclesiastic historian, Philip Schaff, an "unsuccessful ecclesiastical and political agitator, who protested against the secularization of the Church" with what Ullman terms a "fiery call for a return to apostolic poverty", says Ullmann.)

From Eugenius, Adrian inherited what Walter Ullmann has called a "mutual assistance pact" with the Emperor, the Treaty of Constance, signed the year of Eugenius' death. For the popes, its most important aspect was the stipulation that the crowning of the next emperor was contingent on expelling Arnold of Brescia from Rome. It also assured each party of the other's support against both King William in Sicily and the Byzantine Empire when necessary. The treaty was confirmed by Adrian in January 1155. Eugenius was a believer in the Gregorian doctrine of Papal supremacy, stating that Christ "gave to St Peter the keys of the kingdom of heaven, the power of both the earthly and the heavenly empire". From the beginning of his reign, Barbarossa sought to present himself as the heir to a long, established line of Roman Emperors, and likewise that his empire was a continuation of theirs. The historian Anne A. Latowsky explains how this was the cause of tension in the European polity:

Despite grandiose allusions to the German inheritance of the universal dominion of Augustus, the Roman Empire continued to be, as it had been for centuries, a primarily theoretical concept based on an idealized notion of the protection of all Christendom...such claims often clashed with papal pretensions to the primary role as guardians of a unified and universal Christendom

Norwich argues that, by now, whatever the public statements of either Papal or Imperial party, they were mutually antagonistic, and had been for many years. Even before Adrian's pontificate, he says, no peace treaty was strong enough to unite them for long: "The days when it had been realistic to speak of the two swords of Christendom were gone—gone since Gregory VII and Henry IV had hurled depositions and anathemas at each other nearly a hundred years before". The situation, suggest Duggan, was "a minefield", for the Pope, and Adrian had to negotiate it.

It was the ambition of the Emperor of the Eastern Empire, Manuel I Kommenus, to reunite both Empires under one crown, and, as such, he wished to be crowned by the Pope in Rome, as Western emperors were. (Note: The German historian Walter Norden argues that Manuel was Hoping with the help of the papacy to rise to dominion over the west and thereupon over the papacy itself; the popes were dreaming with the support of the Comneni of becoming the masters of the Byzantine church and thereupon of the Byzantine Empire.) The death of Roger II presented Manuel with an opportunity he could not afford to let by, argues Professor Paul Magdalino. The Kingdom of Sicily had been recognised by Innocent II in 1143, notes the Italianist Graham Loud, but "relations with the Papacy remained fraught". The previous King of Sicily, Roger II, had ruled his kingdom with an iron fist, and his nobility chafed, particularly the large number he had effectively dispossessed. His son was less interested than his father in the minutiae of government, and when Roger died in 1154 they took advantage of the new king and rebelled. This was of interest to the Papacy as the rebels were willing to ally themselves with anyone for their purpose.

== Election, 1154 ==
Simplified itinerary of Adrian IV, 1154–1159. Neither distances nor location to scale. Dates indicate Adrian's presence not of arrival departure.

It was Breakspear's being "in the right place at the right time", suggests the Papal librarian Bradford Lee Eden, that led to his election as pope on Saturday 4 December 1154, although Duggan argues that he must also have had exceptional qualities, both to reach the rank he had and as seen in his Scandinavian trip—or as William of Newburgh later wrote, "raised as if from the dust to sit in the midst of princes. Events moved rapidly: the period was one of great crisis for the papacy. Adrian was enthroned the following day and crowned in St Peter's the day after. (Note: A new pope would usually be elected in the Lateran, but this was currently holding Anastasius' body.) His election, said Boso, "happened—not without divine council—that they unanimously agreed" on Adrian. To date, Adrian has been the only pope from England, (Note: At this point, a simple majority vote sufficed until 1179, when the Third Lateran Council increased the required majority to two-thirds.) and was also the only pope from an English-speaking country until the 2025 election of Pope Leo XIV, who was born and raised in the United States. Adrian was one of the few popes of his era who did not need consecrating on his election, as he was already a bishop. (Note: Ullmann notes that this was "a somewhat unusual feature at the time, as many popes were not in orders at the time of their election".)

According to Boso, Breakspear had to be forced "against his will" into the Papal throne. He took the name Adrian IV, possibly in honour of Adrian I, who revered St Alban and first granted the abbey of that name its privileges. It was, suggests Julius Norwich, a "wise choice, for energy and force were desperately needed". Although he had been elected unanimously from among the cardinals, the role of the Roman people was ignored. Thus relations between the Pope and his city were poor from the beginning, as were relations between Adrian and the King of Sicily, who controlled much of southern Italy. Relations with the commune were so bad that Adrian was forced to remain in the Leonine City (Note: The Leonine City was built by Pope Leo III in the 9th century. It was located to the northwest of Rome, beyond the city walls; as such, it was officially outside the jurisdiction of the commune.) and was thus unable to immediately complete the enthronement ceremony, as tradition dictated, by making his adventus into Rome itself. In the event, Adrian was required to remain there for the next four months. As a result, although he had been consecrated, he had not been crowned in the ceremony dies coronae at the Lateran which gave him not his title but gave him feudal title of the papal lands. It is probable that, due to problematic relations with the Romans, he did not receive his crown until the following Easter.

== Pacification of Rome ==
Due to Arnold's presence in Rome, there were a number of acts of religious significance that it was impossible to perform, such as the ceremony of the sede stercoraria, the physical claiming of the curule seats of Saints Peter and Paul. Soon after Adrian's election, a cardinal was badly beaten up by Roman republicans. Adrian was no more popular with the people or Commune of Rome than his immediate predecessors, so at Easter the next year he departed for Viterbo. His "primary task", argues Sayers, "was to control the Emperor" Frederick Barbarossa. Barbarossa had only recently been elected to the Imperial throne and for their own reasons, Pope and Emperor needed each other. Adrian needed Barbarossa's military support against William (known as "The Bad"), King of Sicily, who was threatening the Papal patrimony. (Note: During this period, the Norman Kingdom of Sicily comprised not just the island of Sicily, but most of Southern Italy—Apulia, Calabria and Longobardia—and Malta. Both the Papacy and the Holy Roman Empire also claimed the region.) For his part, the Emperor needed Adrian to perform the traditional imperial coronation service.

Adrian took a hard line against the Roman commune. He threatened to place the city under interdict for protecting Arnold, whom the hierarchy condemned as a heretic. This strategy successfully drove a wedge between the commune and Arnold, who was expelled. He followed through with this threat following the beating of one of his cardinals. Norwich has called this "an act of breath-taking courage", considering that Adrian was a foreign Pope of only a few weeks' tenure, who "knew the city and its increasingly xenophobic inhabitants hardly at all and was able to rely on little or no popular support" (Note: This was not only a spiritual punishment for the city; the drying up of the pilgrimage industry during Lent led to economic hardship.) on the Via Sacra. Rome was forced to submit to the Pope, and Arnold of Brescia was expelled. Although he had managed to restore Papal authority in the city, he was unable to eradicate the principle of republicanism, and the commune remained as the governing body.

=== Capture of Arnold ===
Adrian angled for the support of the Emperor in capturing the heretic Arnold. Arnold was captured by Imperial troops in summer 1155. Arrested and tried in a Papal court for rebellion rather than heresy, he was hanged and his body burnt. Adrian claimed that Arnold's execution had been on the initiative of the prefect of Rome, but some contemporary observers, such as Gerhoh of Reichersberg, suspected Adrian of ordering the execution himself. The Emperor's willingness to assist the Pope in his own city, and help him crush his enemies, was an explicit recognition from Barbarossa of the Pope's possession of Rome. Papal relations with the lords of Campania were already tense, as they, in the Pope's view, were little more than robber barons, who both fought among each other and robbed pilgrims from the south on their way to Rome.

== Imperial trouble at Sutri, late 1155 ==
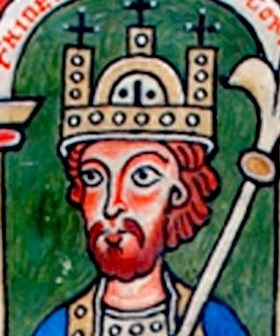
Frederick I, Holy Roman Emperor, as depicted in a 12th-century chronicle

Barbarossa had received the Iron Crown of Lombardy—as King of Italy—in Pavia, but also wished to receive his Imperial Crown from the Pope. Adrian originally saw the Emperor as protector and defender of the church. Both parties, notes Ullmann, were unpopular in Rome:

Because of fear of Roman hostility and disturbances the imperial coronation on 18 June 1155 had to be performed secretly on a Saturday (instead of on a Sunday as usual) in order to mislead the Romans, all this being somewhat incongruous for "the lord of the world and master of Rome" who was there with his armed forces.

To this end, Adrian and Barbarossa met at Sutri in early June 1155. (Note: The sources have not recorded the precise date of the meeting, but the 7th, 8th or 9th of the month all seem most likely.) This soon, says Sayers, "turned out to be a spectacular contest between the two to gain propagandist supremacy". Adrian, reports an Imperial chronicler, was there "with the entire Roman Church, met us joyfully, paternally offered us holy consecration and complained to us of the injuries he had suffered at the hands of the Roman populace". Barbarossa later recalled the ceremony in a letter to the Eastern Emperor in 1189:

For in the city of Rome, which is known as the lady and head of the world, we received the crown and rule over all of Christianity from the altar of St Peter, Prince of the Apostles, and were solemnly anointed with the oil of majesty by the lord Pope Adrian, the successor to St Peter, before our fellows, and our name is held to be famous and glorious because of this".

Adrian may have been caught off-balance by the Emperor's swift entry into Italy and the speed with which he approached Rome. The dispute was sparked by Barbarossa's unwillingness to act as the Pope's strator; lead the Pope's horse by the bridle—or to assist Adrian in dismounting—as was traditionally expected. In response, the Pope refused the Emperor the kiss of peace; the Emperor was still willing to perform the duty of kissing Adrian's feet, though. These were minor affronts at best, says Barber, "but in an age so highly conscious of symbolic acts", took on a greater political import.

The confusion at Sutri may have been accidental, but Frederick also took offence at a mural in the Lateran of his predecessor Luthar which described the Emperor as a liegeman of the Pope. The painting was inscribed with the verse

The king comes before the gates, first swearing to
uphold the rights of the city.
Then he becomes the liegeman of the pope;
he accepts the crown, which the pope gives.

Indignant, Barbarossa made a "friendly reproach" to the Pope. In a letter to a German bishop, he explained, "it began with a picture. The picture became an inscription. The inscription seeks to become an authoritative utterance. We shall not endure it, we shall not submit to it." Adrian told Barbarossa he would have it removed, (Note: The affair was presumably settled diplomatically, as Barbarossa accepted his crown from Adrian in spite of it, and yet the picture remained in the Lateran until at least the 16th century.) "lest so trifling a matter might afford the greatest men in the world an occasion for dispute and discord. In the event, Adrian did not, and by 1158 Imperial commentators were describing the matter of the painting and its inscription as the fundamental cause of the dispute between Pope and Emperor. Adrian, says Freed, was "perplexed" at the Emperor's refusal to offer him squire service: he "dismounted and seated himself on a folding stool". Barbarossa, if he wished to be crowned, had limited options against the Pope. He took advice from councillors based on records of "the more ancient princes and especially those who had come with King Lothar to Pope Innocent". An entire day was spent inspecting both "old documents", (Note: The precise nature of these "old documents" remains unclear; it is possible that they were fragments of Constantine's "Donation".) and hearing from those of his entourage who had been present at the 1131 ceremony. The Pope's party saw this as a sign of aggression, and deserted Adrian for the security of a nearby castle.

=== Imperial coronation, 1155 ===
The Emperor was, though, eventually persuaded, and performed the necessary services. He was eventually crowned in Nepi on 18 June. (Note: Both parties' perspectives were recorded subsequently by sympathetic chroniclers. That of the Empire recorded a meeting characterised by peace and harmony, while Boso describes a tense situation in which the honour of the Papacy was at stake.) Peace was maintained at Nepi, however, and both Pope and Emperor dined together, wearing their crowns in a joint celebration of the Feast of Saints Peter and Paul. There was much rejoicing, and contemporaries went so far as to proclaim that "a single state had been created from two princely courts". Ullmann, on the other hand, argues that, not only was the Emperor's power clearly derivative of the Pope but that Adrian himself had further diluted it in his rendition of the coronation ceremony. (Note: Not only was the Emperor anointed on the shoulder, rather than as previously, on the head, but Adrian introduced a lower-quality oil. He also altered the procedural order of the ceremony. Since 1014, Emperors were first consecrated by the cardinals and then anointed by the Pope, within the Coronation Mass itself. Adrian, however, decided that the anointing should come before the mass. Explains Ullmann, "the underlying reason being that only an ecclesiastical ordo was conferred during mass, but since the future emperor did not receive an ordo, the unction had to be performed before the mass".) Nor was there an official enthronement for the new emperor.

This ceremony, says Sayers, was arguably a new version of the traditional one, which now "highlight[ed] the difference between the anointing of a mere layman and that of a priest". Previously, Emperors had been anointed on the head, as a priest was; this time, Adrian anointed Barbarossa between the shoulders. Further, the Pope invested him with a sword, which emphasised the Emperor's role—as Adrian saw it—as the defender of the Papacy and its privileges. Adrian, on the other hand, disallowed his chancery from addressing the Emperor by either of his preferred titles, augustus semper or semper augustus. It may be that Adrian had been frightened by the Emperor's decisive approach on Rome—Duggan notes he "impos[ed] obedience on recalcitrant cities and proclaim[ed] the resumption of Imperial rights" as he did. If so, that may have led him to over-reacting the face of a perceived slight, however small.

Following the Imperial coronation, both sides appear to have taken extra care to ensure they abided by the Treaty of Constance. Barbarossa, for example, refused to entertain an embassy from the Roman commune. He did not, however, further perform as Adrian hoped, and did not defend the Papacy. Indeed, he stayed in Rome only enough time to be crowned, and then left immediately: "dubious protection" for the Pope, comments Barber. Before he left, however, his army was drawn into a bloody clash with Rome's citizens, incensed at what they saw as a display of Imperial authority in their city. Over 1,000 Romans died. The Senate continued revolting in Rome and William of Sicily remained entrenched in the Patrimony. Adrian was trapped between King and Emperor. Freed suggests that Barbarossa's failure to suppress the Roman commune for Adrian led the Pope to believe the Emperor had broken the Treaty of Constance. Further, on the Emperor's march north, his army sacked and razed the town of Spoleto. Adrian left Rome also, as his relations with the commune were still too fragile for him to be able to guarantee his safety following the Emperor's departure. As a result, the Pope was left in "virtual exile" in Viterbo, and relations between the two declined further.

== Normans, Greeks and Apulians ==
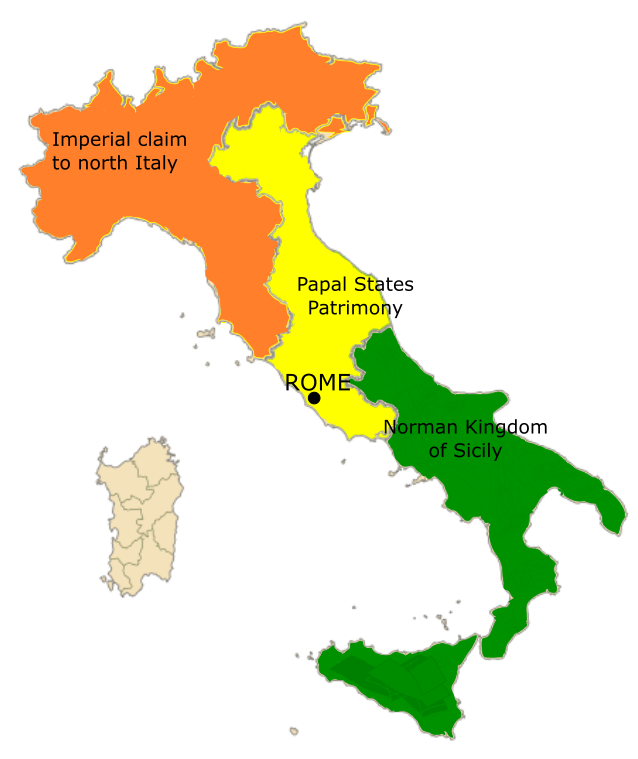
Map of 12th-century Italy, illustrating the respective boundaries between the Papal States and Patrimony and those claimed by King William and Emperor Frederick

Probably as a result, he responded positively to overtures from the Byzantine Emperor Manuel I, and also the native barons of Southern Italy, who saw in Adrian's support a chance for them to overthrow William, whom Adrian had recently excommunicated for invading the Papal patrimony. The rebellion had started off promisingly, with rebel victories at Bari, Trani and Andria. They had already found themselves a powerful ally in Manuel, the Byzantine Emperor, and welcomed anyone—including Adrian—who was hostile to William. Their leader, Count Robert of Loritello, had been charged with treason by William but had managed to escape north. William was temporarily struck down with an unknown illness, as the scholar Joshua C. Birk explains, "this brought the enemies of the kingdom of Sicily out of the woodwork"; among them, Adrian excommunicated William. By 1154, William had captured important towns in the Patrimony. In summer 1155 rebellion broke out in southern Italy by the native nobility against their lord, the King of Sicily. One group of rebels, having gained the support of Emperor Manuel, overran Ancona. By winter 1155, suggests Norwich, few contemporaries "would have held out much hope for the future of the Sicilian monarchy". According to Boso, the rebels asked Adrian to come to them as their feudal lord, to act as their spiritual advisor and bless them in their endeavours. Adrian, believing that William's kingdom would collapse imminently, tried to exploit William's weakness and allied with the rebels in September. As it turned out, this was a miscalculation. William had already asked Adrian for a peace conference, which the Pope had ("scornfully") rejected. (Note: Adrian was deliberately rude to William, suggests the scholar Donald Matthew, for example referring to him as dominus (lord) of Sicily rather than as King. Boso later tried to conceal Adrian's role errors, claiming that it had been the fault of his cardinals.)

=== Alliance with Manuel I, 1156 ===
Emperor Manuel I had launched his own military operation against William in southern Italy in 1154. (Note: The south of Italy, particularly Apulia, had a large Greek population, with Greek Orthodox churches, who "played important roles in the administration of the Norman kingdom", notes Duggan, "and Byzantine emperors had not yet abandoned hopes of re-establishing some control over the south".) He found Adrian a willing ally. The Russian historian Alexander Vasiliev notes that Adrian "expressed his desire 'to help in bringing all the brethren into one church' and compared the eastern church with lost drachma, wandering sheep, and the dead Lazarus". Adrian's isolation led directly to his concordat with the Eastern Empire in 1156, although Duggan emphasises that he was reacting to external political pressures rather than deliberately initiating a new policy. As a result, says Barber, he "became involved in a fruitless Byzantine plan to overcome the Normans which ended, as so often before when the popes had ventured south in arms, in Norman victory". Adrian—as if, says Partner, "the unhappy experiences of at least three popes has taught the papacy nothing"—organised a papal army comprising Roman and Campagnan nobility and crossed the border into Apulia in September 1155.

Although it has been suggested that Manuel offered to pay Adrian a large sum of money in return for ceding him certain Apulian cities, it seems unlikely that this was ever actioned; certainly, notes Duggan, Adrian was wholly against the creation of a Byzantine kingdom on his own doorstep. This was in spite of Manuel deliberately not pressing his Empire's historical claim on South Italy as a whole, and was interested primarily in the coastal areas. (Note: The coastal towns of Apulia had large Greek populations.) Initially, his campaign succeeded, and by 1155 he had annexed Ancona, and had occupied Salento, namely the area from Brindisi to Taranto. Byzantine funding enabled Adrian to temporarily restore his vassal Robert, Count of Loritello, although on one occasion William was able to capture 5,000 pounds (2,300 kilograms) of gold from Manuel that had been destined for the Pope's war chest. There was some discussion of an alliance between Roman pope and Eastern emperor, and Adrian despatched Anselm of Havelberg east to arrange it, although in the event negotiations came to nothing. Magdalino argues that Adrian would not have been interested in an alliance "without the lure of Byzantine gold". Although the Byzantine Emperor had sent his army to support the Pope in Italy—and indeed, had subdued the troublesome region of the Balkans—Adrian, argues Sayers, "could not accept any power for the emperor that was not dependent on the pope". Ullmann argues that although Adrian was receptive to Manuel's ambition of uniting the Eastern and Western Roman Empires, he did not appreciate the manner in which the offer was made. He was particularly averse to Manuel's suggestion that the pope's sword was merely a spiritual force, and, suggests Ullmann, "received Manuel's overtures with that scepticism which they deserved". Adrian, though, while agreeing on the basic tenet of a single emperor and a single church, believed that it was not a case of the Western church joining that of the East, but the latter returning to the former with the "obedience due to a mother", as he put it in a letter to Manuel. In other words, all Christians, East or West, should be subjugated to the church of St Peter.

=== Norman victory ===
Strategically, King William's position was not looking good, and he offered Adrian large sums in financial compensation for the Pope to withdraw his forces. However, the majority of Adrian's curia were averse to holding negotiations with the Sicilians, and the King's offer was rejected somewhat haughtily. This turned out to be a bad mistake. William soon won decisive victories over both Greek and Apulian armies in mid-1156, culminating in the final defeat of the Eastern Empire at the Battle of Brindisi. When William soundly defeated the rebels, Adrian—who was by now, even more, bogged down in the problem of Rome and without allies—had to sue for peace on the King's terms. This was yet another external event—indeed, probably the single most important event of the pontificate she argues—that Adrian had had no way of influencing but had to deal with its consequences, notes Duggan. He was effectively captured and forced to come to terms at Benevento (Note: Benevento was a Papal enclave inside Sicilian southern Italy, so Adrian was unable to escape easily.) three weeks later. This one event, says Duggan, changed Adrian's policy for good, whether or not he liked it. As a result, at the Concordat of Benevento, Adrian had to invest William with the lands he claimed in southern Italy, symbolised by the presentation of the Pope's own pennoned lances and the kiss of peace. The Pope was accepted as William's feudal overlord, while being forbidden from entering Sicily without an invitation from the King, (Note: This did not apply to the mainland of Southern Italy, but, Barber points out, this was effectively the status quo in any case: Popes only entered the region four times between 1154 and 1189.) thereby granting William effectively Legatine authority over the church in his own land. For his part, William gave the Pope his homage and contracted to pay an annual tribute and provide military support on request. The treaty conferred extended powers on the Kings of Sicily that they would enjoy for at least the next 40 years, and included powers over ecclesiastical appointments traditionally held by the Popes as the region's feudal lord. (Note: These were greater powers than the Emperor enjoyed in his realm, and thus embittered relations between him and the Pope further.) Adrian's treaty with William angered the Emperor, who took it as a personal slight that Adrian had treated with the two Imperial rivals to Italy and confirmed his view of Adrian's Papal arrogance. This, suggests Robinson, sowed the seeds of the disputed election following Adrian's death.

The defeat of Manuel's army left the Pope vulnerable, and in June 1156 Adrian was forced to come to terms with the Sicilian King. This was, however, suggests Robinson, on generous terms, including "homage and fealty, reparation for the recent encroachments on the papal patrimony, help against the Romans, freedom from royal control for the Sicilian church". Adrian's new alliance with William exacerbated relations with Barbarossa, who believed that Adrian had broken the Treaty of Constance twice over, by allying with both King William and the Byzantine Emperor. Relations between Pope and Emperor were, argues Latowsky, "irreparably damaged. Adrian probably acted as mediator the following year in concluding a peace treaty between William and Manuel. The Emperor attempted to prevent the treaty by sending his most experienced diplomat, Abbot Wibald to intervene, as he probably saw a Sicilian–Byzantine alliance as being directed against him.

The alliance with William had probably been strengthened by the Pope's belief that Barbarossa had already broken the Treaty of Constance. At the Treaty of Benevento, Adrian was represented by the Cardinals Ubald, Julius and Roland; the Papacy was forced to cede much valuable land, rights and income to William. The Emperor felt personally betrayed: according to the contemporary chronicler Geoffrey of Viterbo, the Pope, "wish[ed] to be an enemy of Caesar". Duggan, however, suggests that the Imperial alliance with the papacy had only ever been a flag of convenience, "ready to be discarded when it had served its purpose". (Note: Duggan suggests that once he had been elected as emperor, all he needed was a puppet pope, and that Adrian's policy of keeping the papacy on an independent course, was an "intolerable provocation".) Bolton, meanwhile, suggests that, as Benevento was an Imperial town, the fact that following the treaty he stayed there for eight more months indicates that Adrian was asserting his power.

== Problems in translation, 1157 ==
By 1157, suggests Whalen, having secured the border with the south (by his alliance with Sicily) and the commune as peaceful as it had been for some time, Adrian was able to reside in Rome again and "stood in a more secure position than any of his predecessors had for decades". They were made worse in 1157 when, in a letter to the Emperor, Adrian referred to the Empire by the Latin term beneficium, which some of Barbarossa's councillors translated as fief, rather than benefice. This, they claimed, implied that the Pope saw the empire as subordinate to the papacy. (Note: The two parties used different terms to mean the same thing. Both originally used beneficium to mean a feudal holding. The church had begun using the term feudum a few years earlier; the Empire had not. It is, suggests Robinson, "difficult to believe" that the Curia had forgotten this.) The Emperor had to personally hold back Otto of Wittelsbach from assaulting the Pope's messengers. Ullmann, however, argues that Adrian's use of the word was "harmless enough...that he conferred the Imperial crown as a favour". Duggan too describes the incident as "at best a diplomatic incident—a faux pas—which suggests carelessness on the part of the drafter". (Note: Who may have been Cardinal Roland, suggests Duggan.) Historians have disagreed as to the degree of deliberation behind the use of the word. Peter Munz, for example, believes it to have been a deliberate provocation, engineered by an anti-Imperial faction within the curia, designed to justify Adrian's treaty with King William. Anne Duggan, on the other hand, suggests this view is "scarcely credible": not only was Adrian in no position of strength from which to threaten Frederick, but he was also aware that the Emperor was planning a campaign against Milan for the following year, and would hardly wish to provoke him into marching on towards the Papal States.

In October 1157, Barbarossa was celebrating his wedding in Besançon with an Imperial Diet, (Note: Besançon was an important Imperial town, being the capital of Upper Burgundy, and the Emperor's wedding celebration was attended by representatives of the crowned heads of Christendom; thus, notes Norwich, his falling out with the Pope was an exceedingly public one.) when he was visited by Papal legates Roland (Note: Roland had been a student of Gratian and had gone on to teach at the University of Bologna; with Roland, comments Ullmann, "the dynasty of the great lawyer Popes was to begin".) and Bernard. Theirs was an important mission bringing personal letters from Adrian, and they were met "with honour and kindness, claiming (as they did) to be the bearers of good tidings". The Pope complained about the lack of activity in discovering who attacked Eskil, Archbishop of Lund while he travelled through Imperial territory. Eskil, complained Adrian, had been captured somewhere "in the German lands...by certain godless and infamous men", and Frederick had made no attempt to secure his release. (Note: Eskil at the time was persona non grata in the Empire, and Freed suggests that Adrian—while never placing his thoughts on paper—"probably suspected Frederick of complicity in Eskil's capture as well as laxity in procuring his release". Duggan suggests that it was wholly political, as Adrian's recent elevation of the Lund Archbishopric had "effectively detached the region from the ecclesiastical jurisdiction" of the Empire.) Adrian's letter, suggests Godman, both upbraids the Emperor for "dissimulation" and "negligence" while accusing Rainald of Dassel of being a "wicked counsellor ", although Duggan describes it more as a "mild rebuke". Barber comments that "the tone is that of one who is surprised and a little hurt that, having treated Frederick so affectionately and honourably, he had not had a better response, but the actual words used to express these sentiments gave rise to immediate offence". Adrian's defence of Eskil of Lund contributed further to the decline in his relationship with Barbarossa. Adrian's choice of occasion on which to rebuke the Emperor was bound to offend him, argues Norwich. But even if unintentional, argues Freed, the Pope should have instructed his delegates to meet with Barbarossa privately rather than in the open. Equally provocative, Freed suggests, was Adrian's later assertion that letters which criticised the Emperor's behaviour were somehow to his advantage. Adrian's "sharp" words also contributed to the Emperor's advisors increasing discontent with his messengers. The Pope had also ordered that, before any negotiations took place, the Emperor's council would accept Adrian's letters "without any hesitation...as though proceeding from our mouth". The cardinals appear to have worsened their reception by calling Frederick "brother".

The Emperor was also exasperated to find, on ordering the legates' quarters searched, blank parchments with the Papal seal attached. This he understood to mean that the legates had intended to present supposedly direct instructions from the Pope when they felt it necessary. Barbarossa claimed that he held his crowns directly from God and that Adrian "did not understand his Petrine commission if he thought otherwise". Following promulgation of Adrian' letter, says Godman, "there was uproar". Worse, says Barbarossa's contemporary chronicler Otto of Freising, the legates compounded the insult by asking those present "from whom the does he have the empire, if not from our lord the pope?" The two ecclesiasts were then nearly beaten up, but the Emperor enabled their swift escape.

=== Retranslation ===
In June 1158, representatives of both sides met in the Imperial town of Augsburg. Adrian attempted to pacify the Emperor and claimed that he meant, not "fief", but "good deed": "Among us beneficium means not a fief but a good deed", he wrote. Barber suggests, though, that "his explanation was far from convincing". On the other hand, notes the Emperor's biographer John Freed, Barbarossa was illiterate, and required everything translated. He was thus in constant danger of relying on mistranslations, and it is possible that this happened at Besançon. (Note: Freed notes that beneficium had "three different meanings in the twelfth century: 'good deed', as Adrian pointed out in his conciliatory letter of June 1158; 'an ecclesiastical living', the modern English 'benefice'; and 'fief'".) Taken at face value, this phrase appeared to assert that Adrian was the Emperor's feudal overlord. Latowsky argues that the mistranslation was a deliberate ploy by Barbarossa's Archchancellor Rainald of Dassel—whom she describes as a "multilingual provocateur"—whose Chancery was waging a propaganda war against Adrian. (Note: The Latinist Peter Godman has described Rainald as "a fomenter of schism and despiser of the Church".) The Pope had earlier condemned Rainald's election as Archbishop of Cologne, believing Rainald to be nothing less than the Devil's agent. (Note: Specifically, as suggestione perversi hominis zizania seminantis or "the machinations of a depraved man sowing tares", a biblical term used in relation to Lucifer. John of Salisbury called him schismatic-in-chief during Adrian's lifetime, and as late as 1166 still believed Rainald to be the "greatest among the locusts of the beasts".) Latowsky suggests that Rainald had intended to cause trouble between Emperor and Pope. If this was the case, he succeeded, as Barbarossa was only just restrained from sending an army against Adrian. The Emperor did make a public declaration against Adrian, though, calling for his deposition on the grounds that, as the son of a priest, he was an uncanonical pope. Ullmann notes that canonicity "was indubitably a double-edged weapon; if Adrian was an uncanonical pope, then Frederick was an uncanonical emperor, and that seems the only reason why this point was not pressed further". Duggan summarises Adrian's Augsburg letter as being concomitant to one's interpretation of the original offence, noting that "the context...determines everything". While Munz views the Augsburg outcome as a "humiliating" retreat by Adrian, Duggan argues that, if one does not view the Besançon letter as deliberately provocative, "then there was no withdrawal from that provocation".

Adrian's choice of words may also have been a "calculated ambiguity", suggests Abulafia, (Note: The ecclesiastical historian Z. N. Brooke has argued that the difference in meaning, while subtle to modern ears, would have been plain to medieval observers; he suggests that "the significance of [Adrian's choice of words] might have escaped us, if we had not got the Emperor's violent protest against it".) and in the event, Adrian never publicly acknowledged which of the interpretations he had actually intended. This would have allowed him to suggest the Emperor has misunderstood him while allowing the Pope to intimate to his own church that the Emperor was indeed a Papal vassal. Adrian "trivialised" Barbarossa's anger with irony, commenting that "this should not have vexed the heart of even one in lowly station, to say nothing of so great a man". The Augsburg meeting seems to have improved relations between pope and emperor. As Freed notes, though, "the fundamental question...remained unresolved", and any improvement in relations was temporary, as they fell out again later that year over the appointment of the next Archbishop of Ravenna. This revived the question of their respective roles, as the nominations were split between each sides' preferences; in the event, the Imperial candidate—Guido of Biandrate—was elected against Adrian's wishes. There was also increasing disagreement over the traditional fodrum Imperial taxation levied in north Italy.

== Imperial claims to north Italy ==
Adrian's opposition to Guido of Biandrate's appointment had so incensed the Emperor that he no longer placed the Pope's name before his own in their correspondence, as had been a traditional sign of honour. Furthermore, he began aggressively asserting his claims over Lombardy, and in 1159 the Diet of Roncaglia issued a series of decrees claiming extensive lands in north Italy. (Note: The basis of the Emperor's claims was, in Duggan's words, the belief that "virtually all civic administration was deemed to be derived from, and thus subject to, imperial authority".) This caused sufficient concern that the cities of Milan—which Barbarossa had already "half-destroyed", says Ullmann—Brescia, Piacenza and Crema (which had also suffered a "brutal siege", notes Duggan) approached Adrian for aid. Since the lands concerned were part of the Papal fiefdom, Adrian, in Bologna, rejected Barbarossa's claim and gave him 40 days in which to withdraw them, on pain of excommunication. However, Adrian's intervention in a quarrel between the Emperor and the Lombard towns may, suggests the classicist Peter Partner, "may have been inevitable, but it was to be one of the most explosive issues of its age".

Duggan has emphasised the severity of the situation facing Adrian: accepting Frederick's claims, she says, would have entailed Adrian effectively "abandoning the whole Italian church". Adrian also had counter-demands. Frederick was to desist from sending envoys to Rome without papal permission, that he should only be paid the Imperial tax from his Italian lands while in Italy and that those papal lands in north Italy be returned to the church. Adrian, says Duggan, "received short thrift". In the event Adrian died before his 40-day term expired. As relations between Emperor and Pope worsened, Barbarossa took to placing his own name before that of Adrian in their correspondence, as well as addressing the Pope in the singular. By now, suggests Duggan, Adrian was viewed with contempt by the Emperor.

== Relations with England ==
Pope Adrian, comments Sayers, "was not unmindful of the interests and well-being of his English homeland", and Robinson identifies his pontificate as "the period in which English influence was strongest in the papal curia". Adrian remained faithful to the cult of St Alban and often promoted King Henry's political ambitions when he could. For example, suggests Brooke, following his lengthy stay with Adrian, John of Salisbury seems to have acquired the belief that he would at some point receive a cardinalate. However, John fell out with King Henry for a now-unknown reason, and Adrian—probably wishing to promote his friend but essentially a diplomat and a realist—could not afford to alienate his only major supporter in northern Europe. Adrian also favourably received at least two curial embassies from St Albans in 1156 and 1157. (Note: Bolton notes, though, that even before their own "loyal son" become Pope, abbots of St Alban's "did everything in their power to advance and promote the position of their house".) In 1156 Adrian ordered King Henry II to appoint an otherwise unknown Hugh to a London prebend. He wrote to Roger, Archbishop of York two months after Adrian's election confirming the Papal Legates in their offices.

Adrian had been absent from England since 1120, and it should not be assumed that he bore an automatic affection for the country which, in Richard Southern's words, had given him "no reasons to cherish warm feelings" about it. However, in 1156, when John of Salisbury—"in circumstances which otherwise remain obscure"—had fallen into disgrace with the English King, Adrian regularly petitioned Henry for his friend's reinstatement. This was eventually won, but had taken a year to achieve. Anne Duggan, of King's College, London, describes Anglo-Papal relations at this time as "not so much to a policy, perhaps, but to persistent intervention...and to a degree of acceptance, willing or not, on the part of Church authorities". However, Adrian was willing to intervene in English church affairs when it suited, as in February 1156 when he threatened Nigel, Bishop of Ely with suspension from office over what the art historian C. R. Dodwell has called Nigel's having "stripped-down, sold, or used as security, a quite astounding number of Ely's monastic treasures".

Among other patronages, he confirmed the nuns of St Mary's Priory, Neasham in possession of their church. and granted St Albans Abbey "a large dossier of privileges and directives" exempting it from the jurisdiction of its episcopal master, Robert de Chesney, Bishop of Lincoln. He also confirmed the primacy of the Archbishop of York over Scottish bishops and his independence from the Archbishop of Canterbury. He also granted papal protection—"free and immune from all subjection except to the Roman pontiff"—to Scottish towns, such as that of Kelso in 1155. He also, on occasion, sent his young protégés to the court of King Henry to learn the aristocratic arts of hunting, falconry and the martial arts.

Adrian, suggests the papal scholar Brenda M. Bolton, had a particularly "special relationship" with his "home abbey" of St Albans, demonstrated in his generous and wide-ranging privilege Incomprehensibilis, published in Benevento on 5 February 1156. (Note: The title of the grant came, as was traditional with Papal documents, from the opening words. In this case, the first sentence is: Incomprehensibilis et ineffabilis diuine miseratio maiestatis nos hac providentie ratione in apostolice sedis administratione constituit... / The incomprehensible and ineffable mercy of the Divine Majesty has established us in the apostolic see for this providential reason...) With this grant, Adrian allowed the abbot the right to wear pontificals, thereby effectively removing the abbot from the jurisdiction of Robert de Chesney, his bishop. The monks were also allowed to elect the abbot of their choosing without deference to the bishop. Neither could they be forced by him to allow him or his agents entry to the abbey, or to attend episcopal synods. In two follow up letters, Adrian gave the Abbot of St Albans authority to replace the clerks in churches under his jurisdiction with his preferred candidates. Brooke describes Adrian as "rain[ing] privilege after privilege upon the abbey.

=== Laudabiliter ===
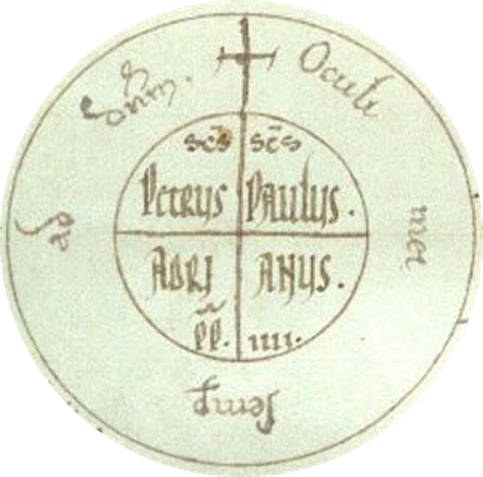
The rota of Pope Adrian IV. The two top quarters contain Petrus and Paulus respectively (for the saints), while the bottom two show the Pope's name (in this case as ADRI–ANUS) and his regnal number.

Probably Adrian's "most striking" donation to England, however, was the Papal Bull Laudabiliter of 1155. This was supposedly made either while Adrian was in Benevento or had moved on to Florento. John of Salisbury later claimed credit, writing how "at my request [Adrian] conceded and gave Ireland as a hereditary possession to the illustrious king of the English, Henry II". This granted the island of Ireland to Henry II in fee simple. Adrian's justification was that, since the Donation of Constantine, countries within Christendom were the Pope's to distribute as he would. (Note: This was the same basis for the Papacy's claim to precedence over the Holy Roman Empire, as the inheritor of the ancient Roman Empire in the West. Laudabiliter was, however, the only time in the 12th century that the Donation was interpreted as allowing interference in foreign countries.) The claim of Vicarius Christi which Adrian inherited allowed him, he believed, to wield the temporal power of his subjects through them. Sayers suggests that "while some kind of Irish mission" was clearly intended by Adrian, the precise nature of the grant remains unclear. (Note: This is compounded by the fact that no copy of Laudabiliter is extant.) Duggan, also notes that neither Henry or Adrian ever seems to have referred to it in their own letters again: "whatever Adrian granted, and he did grant something, there is no reliable evidence" as to its nature or what it comprised.

King Henry claimed to be motivated by a wish to civilise the supposedly unruly Irish. The Victorian historian Kate Norgate, however, has noted that the spiritual community in 12th-century Ireland "flourished", and that the Pope must have known this, as it was only a few years earlier that the Irish church had been reorganised into Archdioceses, thus making it a national church in its own right. Norgate argues that Adrian's grant was made, not because the church in Ireland needed protecting, but because the Irish lacked a single king and for Christian society to have no single head was an anathema. She also notes that it has misleadingly been called a Bull, when it is, in fact, sufficiently informal in its style to be "nothing more than a commendatory letter". Simple in its approach, the Pope exhorts Henry—if he is to invade Ireland—to do so in the name of the church. Other scholars have argued that, whether or not it was an out and out forgery by Gerald of Wales, Adrian was more likely to have been lukewarm at the idea of invasion at best, as he was equally unenthusiastic at the notion of a Franco-English crusade to the East at the same time.

The Bull "granted and gave Ireland to King Henry II to hold by hereditary right, as his letters witness unto this day", and was accompanied by a gold Papal ring "as a token of investiture". In the early 14th century it was claimed ("by the ordinary [i.e. English] people of Ireland") that Pope had been persuaded—"improperly"—to grant Laudabiliter, not on the persuasion of Henry II, but on that from the Irish themselves. (Note: Specifically, says the early medievalist Robin Frame, that of MacMurrough, King of Leinster, who, having been expelled from his lands, asked Henry for aid, who then "informed Pope Adrian of MacMurrough's suggestion and asked for permission to enter that land".) If he did issue the bull, Adrian may have been influenced by the fact that the Irish church did not pay Peter's Pence, which was a major source of the Papacy's income. He would almost certainly, too, have been aware of Bernard of Clairvaux's letter of 1149, in which he wrote that

Never before had he known the like, in whatever depth of barbarism; never had he found men so shameless in regard of morals, so dead in regard to rites, so stubborn in regard of discipline, so unclean in regard of life. They were Christians in name, in fact pagans.

Notes Summerson, "the consequences of the bull were still invisible when Adrian died". As early as 1317, Adrian's grant to Henry was linked in Ireland to his nationality, (Note: Nationality has been impossible to avoid in the subsequent historiography, comments the medievalist J. D. Hosler: The controversy over the veracity of Hadrian's bull has been rather intense, due not only to the vagaries surrounding the evidence but also no doubt to the ubiquity of past and present Anglo-Irish hostilities". J. H. Round called it "one of the hottest historical controversies that this generation has known", while Hosler argues that the bull "would today be a non-issue was it not for Henry II's eventual conquest of Ireland sixteen years later in 1171".) and Domnall, King of Tír Eoghain complained that Adrian should be known as "Anti-Christ rather than true Pope". The Irish called him "a man not only of English descent but also of English inclinations", who "backed his compatriots in what they regarded as the first major confrontation between the two nations", whereas the Bishop of Thessaloniki praised Adrian as a pastor ("which is how", comments the scholar Averil Cameron, "the Byzantines liked to see the Popes").

== Acts as pope ==
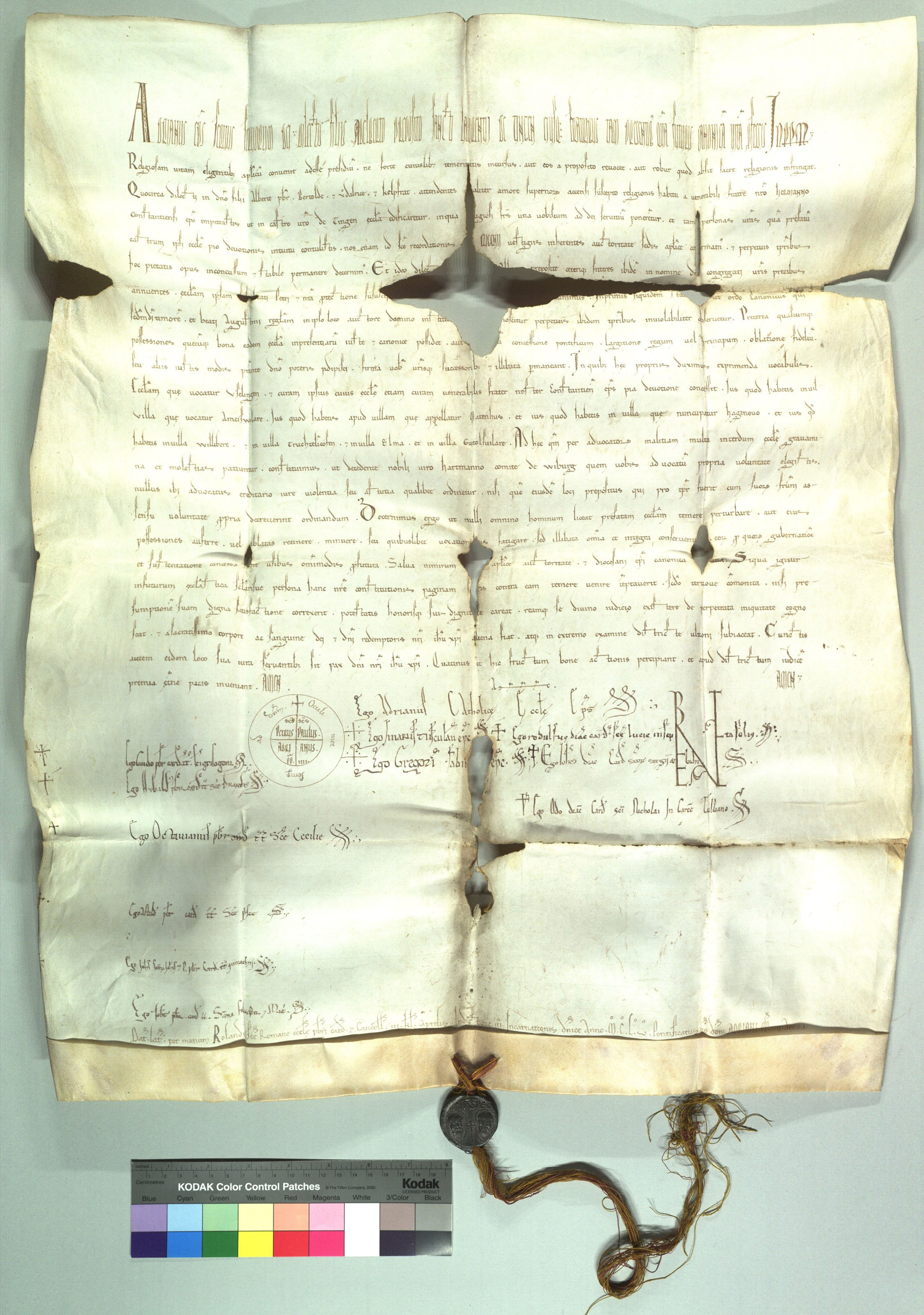
Charter of Pope Adrian IV, also beginning Adrianus eps servus servorum dei, dated the Lateran, 30 March 1156. Note the Papal monogram, Bene Valete, bottom-right-hand corner.

In 1155 the city state of Genoa approached Adrian and sought him to help them defend their trading rights in the East. (Note: Whilst at the same time making overtures to the Manuel I to formalise a trading treaty with Genoa.) The same year Adrian issued the decretal Dignum est which allowed serfs to marry without having to obtain their lord's permission as had traditionally been the case. Adrian's reasoning was that a sacrament outweighed a feudal due and that no Christian had the right to stand in the way of another's receiving of a sacrament. This was to become the definitive statement of marriage as a sacrament, and remained such until the recodification of Canon Law in 1917. The same year, Adrian consecrated the Bishop of Grado, Enrico Dandolo as Primate of Dalmatia. Two years later, Adrian granted him primacy over all the Venetian churches in the Eastern Empire. This has been described as "a remarkable move": The historian Thomas F. Madden notes that not only was this the first occasion on which one metropolitan had been given jurisdiction over another, but in doing so Adrian had created the equivalent of an Eastern Patriarch in the west. He also confirmed the degradation of Baume Abbey imposed by Eugenius for its failure to obey a Papal legate.

Adrian confirmed the prerogatives of the Knights Templar and documented in the Liber Censuum. He also enforced the rules against unfree ecclesiastical elections and condemned ecclesiastics who used physical force against the church. Perhaps reflecting his earlier career, he also promulgated several bulls in favour of the Austin canons. Again, he particularly focussed on houses of his personal association; St Ruf, for example, received at least 10 bulls of privilege. In one of these, he expressed a "special bond of affection" for his old abbey, which he said had been like a mother to him.

Adrian argued that, in the troubled succession to Alfonso I of Aragon, even though Alfonso had legally nominated an heir—his brother—because he had not had a son, his brother was not a direct heir to the Kingdom. This was the context for the projected crusade into Spain as suggested by the Kings of England and France, which Adrian rejected. He did, however, welcome their new friendship.

It was probably Adrian who canonised Sigfrid of Sweden around 1158, thus making Sigfrid Sweden's apostle. Robinson notes that Adrian's fascination with Scandinavia continued into his pontificate, particularly in his efforts to create a Swedish metropolis. He was also keen to defend its church against lay encroachment. In January 1157 Archbishop Eskil (Note: Eskil was a personal friend of Bernard of Clairvaux and had been responsible for originally introducing monasticism to Denmark and Sweden.) personally presented a petition to Adrian in Rome, requesting protection from King Swein of Denmark. (Note: Swein was also a vassal of the Holy Roman Emperor.) Adrian both appointed the Bishop of Lund his Legate in the region and recognised him as primate over both Sweden and Denmark. (Note: Eventually the three provinces agreed on Uppsala as the centre of the proposed metropolitan, and Alexander III conferred it in 1164.)

Other cardinalate appointments of Adrian's included that of Alberto di Morra in 1156. Di Morra, also a canon regular like Adrian, later reigned briefly as Pope Gregory VIII in 1187. Boso, already papal chamberlain since 1154, was appointed the same year. Adrian also elevated one Walter to the Pope's own Cardinal Bishopric of Albano; Walter is thought to have been an Englishman—possible also from St Ruf—but very little record of his career has survived. In contrast, his appointment of Raymond des Arénes in 1158 was of a well-known lawyer with an established career under Adrian's predecessors. These were all worthy additions to the Curial office, argues Duggan, being all men of "experience, academic learning and administrative and diplomatic skill", which in turn reflects the wisdom of the appointer. He may have received the hermit and later saint Silvester of Troina, whose only recorded journey was from Sicily to Rome during Adrian's pontificate.

Adrian continued the reform of the Papacy's finances that had begun under his predecessor in an attempt at boosting revenue, (Note: This process involved Boso, as Chamberlain examining old rent books from the archives in the hope of discovering lost Papal dues, and Adrian also ordered the keeping of more precise fiscal records, which became the nucleus of the Liber Censuum.) although he regularly had to resort to requesting large loans from major noble families such as the Corsi and Frangipane. (Note: For example, a loan from Pietro Frangipane in 1158 of 1,000 marks, for which a number of Papal castles had been given as security, was not paid off until 1190.) His appointment of Boso as Chamberlain—or camerarius—of the Papal patrimony did much to improve the Papacy's finances by way of streamlining its financial bureaucracy. However, he also recognised the expense that the Papay was put to defending its own, commenting nemo potest sine stipendiis militare, or "no-one can make war without pay". Adrian also consolidated the Papacy's position as the feudal lord of the regional baronage; indeed, his success in doing so has been described as "never less than impressive". In 1157, for example, Adrian made Oddone Frangipane donate his castle to him, which Adrian then granted back to Oddone in fee. (Note: Wickhma argues this was Papal policy: "aristocrats in Rome had to resign themselves to having possession of their lands, not full property".) occasionally Adrian simply purchased castles and lordships for the papacy, as he did Corchiano. Adrian received the personal oaths of fealty of a number of north-Roman nobles, thus making them vassals of St Peter. In 1158, for example, for fighting in the Reconquista—"subduing the barbarous peoples and the savage nations, that is, the fury of the Saracens"—Ramon Berenguer, Count of Barcelona was accepted "under St Peter's and our protection". In 1159 Adrian ratified an agreement with the civic leadership of Ostia—an otherwise semi-independent town—agreed to pay the Pope an annual feudal rent for his lordship. Adrian's vassals, and their family and vassals, took oaths of fealty to the Pope, and in doing so the vassal absolved his own vassals of their oaths to him. All now became direct vassals of the Papacy. One of Adrian's greatest achievements, believed Boso, was acquiring Orvieto as a Papal fief, because this city had "for a very long time withdrawn itself from the jurisdiction of St Peter" Adrian, in 1156, was the first Pope to enter Orvieto, emphasised Boso, and to "have any temporal power there".

Adrian appears to have been an advocate of the crusade since his abbacy of St Ruf, and was equally keen to rekindle the crusading spirit among Christian rulers as Pope. The most recent crusade had ended, poorly, in 1150, but Adrian made what has been called a "novel approach" to launching a new one. In 1157 he announced that, whereas previously indulgences were available to those who fought in the East, from now on they would be also available to those who supported the war effort without necessarily campaigning abroad. This opened the benefits of crusading up to those who supplied money, men or materiel. However, his proposal, novel or otherwise, appears to have met with little interest, and no further crusading was to take place until 1189. He did not, however, approve of Crusading within Christendom itself, as when the French and English kings both proposed a crusade into Muslim Spain, he urged caution upon them. In his January 1159 letter Satis laudabiliter, while flattering both kings diplomatically, he advised that "it would seem to be neither wise nor safe to enter a foreign land without first seeking the advice of the princes and people of the area". Indeed, Adrian reminded Henry and Louis of the consequences of badly planned and mismanaged crusades by reference to the Second Crusade—of which Louis had been a leader—reminding him that, there too, Louis had invaded "without consulting the people of the area". (Note: He did however defer rather than deny the request for a crusade, as he intimated that, if his conditions were met—i.e. that western princes were invited to do so—he would then countenance their crusade.)

Adrian also undertook a building program throughout Rome and the patrimony, although Duggan notes that the shortness of his pontificate reduced the amount of his work that remains visible in the 21st century. The work ranged from the restoration of public buildings and spaces to the city's physical defence. Boso reported how, for example, "in the church of St Peter [Adrian] richly restored the roof of St. Processo which he found collapsed", while in the Lateran, he "caused to be made a very necessary and extremely large cistern". Due to the peripatetic nature of his pontificate he also built a large number of summer palaces across the patrimony, including at Segni, Ferentino, Alatri, Anagni and Rieti. Much of this fortification and building work—particularly in the vicinity of Rome—was for the protection of pilgrims, the safety of whom Adrian was both spiritually and physically reliable for.

Although his pontificate was a relatively short one—four years, six months and 28 days—he spent nearly half that time outside of Rome, either in the enclave of Benevento or journeying around the Papal States and patrimony. Particularly in the early years of the reign, his travels reflected the political context, consisting of "short bursts" as he sought to either meet or avoid the Emperor or William of Sicily as the situation required.

== Personal philosophy and religious views ==
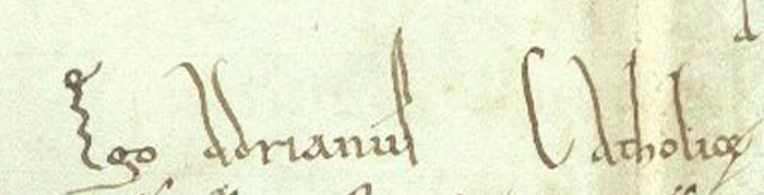
The autograph of Pope Adrian IV, reading Ego Adrianus Catholicae

The Pope was conscious, comments Sayers, "of the crushing responsibilities" of his office, telling John of Salisbury that he felt his Papal tiara to be "splendid because it burned with fire". He was also highly conscious of the historicity of the Petrine tradition; as much as any of his predecessors, says Duggan, Adrian upheld the "unifying and an co-ordinating role of the Papal office", and regularly expressed himself on how he viewed his position as that akin to being a steward: He also recognised his own smallness within that tradition, telling John of Salisbury that "the Lord has long since placed me between the hammer and the anvil, and now he must support the burden he has placed upon me, for I cannot carry it". This explains his use of the epithet Servus servorum Dei, comments Duggan: more than purely rhetorical, it amalgamated his concept of "stewardship, duty and usefulness" in three words.

Having been placed by the Lord's disposition in a lofty watchtower, if the rights of all churches are not preserved whole and unimpaired, we would seem to occupy the place of St Peter Prince of the Apostles unprofitably and to exercise the office of stewardship entrusted to us negligently.

Adrian was keen to emphasise the superiority of the Western Church over that of the East, and lost no opportunity to tell members of that body so. Adrian described his approach to relations with his political rivals in a letter to the Archbishop of Thessaloniki. St Peter's authority was indivisible and could not be shared with temporal rulers, he argued. As such—as the descendant of St Peter—neither should he. Central to Adrian's view of his Papacy, says Sayers, was the conviction that his court was the highest court in Christendom and, so, the final court of appeal, and he encouraged appeals from many countries. In an early letter, defending the principle of Papal Monarchy, he compares Christendom to the human body: all the parts can only function as they should if they have an overarching guide and facilitator. To Adrian, Christian Europe was the body, and the Pope the head. The historian Neil Hegarty has suggested that, on the assumption that Laudabiliter as is extant can be believed, Adrian firmly believed in "enlarging the borders of the Church, setting bounds to the progress of wickedness, reforming evil manners, planting virtue, and increasing the Christian religion". Adrian was keen to know what people thought of the Roman Church, and often asked the question of John of Salisbury. John also recorded Adrian's view's on the Papacy accepting gifts from Christians, which some viewed as simonaical and evidence of corruption. Adrian, reported John, replied with reference to the fable of the belly. The European analyst Andreas Musolff explains the Pope's position as "deducing from it the church's right to receive, and allocate, the nourishment to the Christian body according to merit and utility".

Adrian, argues Ullmann, was a man of action with little "inclination towards lengthy theoretical discussions", although Norwich argues that he could still be hesitant. For instance, following his radical change of Papal policy at Benevento, he may still not have grasped the significance of what he had done, and certainly not to the extent of radically exploiting the new policy. Partner suggests that Adrian was "an able administrator who used able agents". He was also a traditionalist; a firm follower of Pope Gregory VII, Adrian believed it his duty to not just believe in those ideals, but to enforce them. He also believed in the necessity of reform, as his clarification of the marriage sacrament and enforcement of free episcopal elections demonstrates. He was also, like Eugenius had been before him, a firm believer in the supremacy of the Bishops of Rome over both the Empire and other churches, writing how the Papacy,

Like a diligent mother provides for the individual churches with constant vigilance: all must have recourse to her, as to their head and origin, to be defended by her authority, to be nourished by her breasts and freed of their oppressions.

=== Writings ===
The 16th-century Jesuit commentator Augustino Oldoini, in his re-edition of Alphonsus Ciacconius' Papal History, wrote that Adrian had authored a number of works prior to his election. These included a treatise De Conceptione Beatissimae Virginis, a monograph, De Legationae sua and a catechism for the Scandinavian church. Some of his correspondence survives. One such letter, from Hildegarde, exhorts him to crush the Roman commune. Joseph Baird and Radd Ehrman, editors of a collection of Hildegard's letters, note that it was "perhaps unneeded", as Adrian placed the city under Interdict almost immediately. (Note: This particular letter has been described as expressing "ideas which are themselves highly abstruse...where either the imagery is so contorted as to be intelligible only to the recipient, if in fact even to him, or as to be deliberately indecipherable", as it contains references to a large number of allegorical animals.) Much of Adrian's correspondence with both Archbishop Theobald and John of Salisbury has also been published in collections of the latter's letters. (Note: In an early letter, Theobald berates Adrian for sending a messenger who "has either betrayed his trust out of malice or lost them [Theobald's letters] through negligence or has falsely pretended that they were lost", and advises Adrian to "speak to your messenger at your good pleasure and, if it please you, give him instructions to carry out your business with greater caution and fidelity".)

Adrian's episcopal registry is now lost, although some decretals—formal rulings—survive. (Note: This compares, however, to 713 from Alexander III's pontificate.) These covered such questions as to whether it was possible to restore a priest to his office when he had been responsible for the death of an apprentice, the payment of tithes, and the marriage of the unfree. Adrian's thoughts on tithe payment also made their way into the body of Canon Law, and were, according to Duggan, "recognised by contemporaries as having special significance, and so included in the collections of canon law being assembled at the time".

== Personality ==
For he was very kind, mild, and patient; accomplished in English and Latin, fluent in speech, polished in eloquence. An outstanding singer, and an excellent preacher; slow to anger and swift to forgive; a cheerful giver, lavish in alms, distinguished in every aspect of his character.

— Cardinal Boso, Vita Adriani IV (late 1170s)

The historian Colin Morris notes that Adrian's character appears contradictory: "Some historians have seen him as tough and inflexible, but others as a relatively mild man" who could be manipulated by those around him. Duggan disputes that he was either a cypher to be manipulated by the cardinals or a prima donna. Rather, she suggests, he was "a man of discipline, who fitted in with the norms and routines already in place...a man of affairs who had no fixed program, but who responded judiciously to the problems brought before his court.

Adrian's chamberlain, Boso—who later wrote Adrian's Vita—described the Pope as "mild and kindly in bearing, of high character and learning, famous as a preacher, and renowned for his fine voice". Julius Norwich describes Adrian as being eloquent, able and with "outstanding good looks". The German antiquarian Ferdinand Gregorovius believed that by nature Adrian was "as firm and as unyielding as the granite of his tomb", while Norwich tempers this suggestion, believing that, at least after Benevento, he must have been far more open to the possibilities of change. Duggan wonders whether he deliberately utilised these traits to forward his career. Boso's characterisation, she suggests, "could imply that he was ready to ingratiate himself with the powerful, to make friends and influence people by accommodation and charm". Sayers also suggests that something similar is detectable in the accounts from John of Salisbury, a close friend to the Pope since the days of Adrian's curial visits. (Note: Indeed, R. L. Poole has asserted that John had an illegitimate son, which he named Adrian in the Pope's honour, and that, had the child been a girl, he was going to name her Adriana.)

For I call on the Lord Adrian to witness than no one is more miserable than the Roman Pontiff, nor is any condition more wretched than his. ... He maintains that the papal throne is studded with thorns, that his mantle bristles with needles so sharp that it oppresses and weighs down the broadest shoulders ... and that had he not feared to go against the will of God he would never have left his native England.

— John of Salisbury, Polkratkus, Book VIII, xxiii.

Adrian's own view of his office, suggests Sayers, is summed up in his own words: his "pallium was full of thorns and the burnished mitre seared his head", would have supposedly preferred the simple life of a canon at St Ruf. However, he also respected those who worked beneath him in the curia's officialdom; on one occasion he instructed that "we ought to reward such persons with ecclesiastical benefices when we conveniently can". This approach is reflected in the elevation of fellow Englishmen—Walter, and potentially John of Salisbury—to high office. Brooke suggests that, ultimately, Adrian "had not forgot his origins; he liked to have Englishmen about him".

His increasing control over Rome and the Patrimony demonstrate that he was an effective organiser and administrator, argues the scholar Edward Whalen. Duggan argues that Adrian's strength of personality can be seen in his very election: in spite of being an outsider, a newcomer and lacking the support or patronage of an Italian noble house he attained the apotheosis of his church. And, she says, these were the qualities that made him independent.

His biographer, Cardinal Boso, (Note: Boso also wrote vitae of Innocent II, Eugenius III and Alexander III.) was a close friend who visited Adrian at Rome between November 1155 and June the following year. (Note: Sheehy describes Boso as "one of the most influential clerics in the England of his day", who later became Bishop of Chartres. He was also a good friend to the English Archbishop of Canterbury, Thomas Becket, although there is no evidence, says Duggan, to suggest that he was either English or a nephew of Pope Adrian's, as Victorian historians believed.) John's feelings for Adrian were strong enough, indeed, for them to have been compared with, for example, that of Richard the Lionheart for Philip of France. Boswell notes that in John's Metalogicon, he used terms reminiscent of those used by chroniclers to describe relations between the Kings. (Note: The gender historian James Boswell, writing in his Christianity, Social Tolerance, and Homosexuality, emphasises, however, that this does not make them, in modern terminology, "latently homosexual", but rather that John and Hadrian, who conceived of their love for each other in terms very like those used to describe the passion between the two kings, would have reacted somewhat differently to homosexual sentiments than modern churchmen, who would not describe their friendships with men in such terms".)

Modern historiography has not always been complimentary to Adrian. Freed argues that Adrian was capable of both shameful and specious arguments in his dispute with Barbarossa. Likewise, David Abulafia has called Adrian "petulant", and Latowsky has criticised his "sarcastic" manner towards Barbarossa.

== Death ==
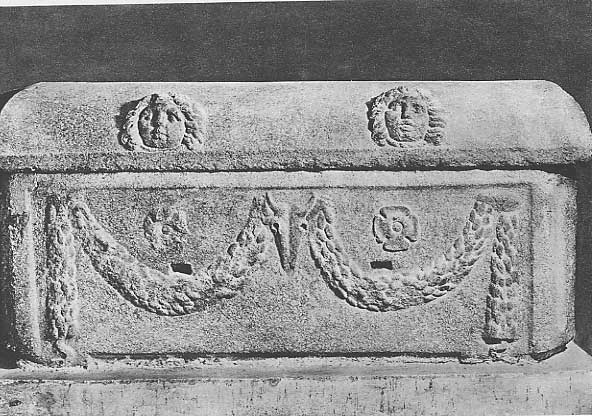
Tomb of Pope Adrian IV, a repurposed early Christian sarcophagus

At Anagni Hadrian proclaimed the emperor excommunicate and a few days later, to cool himself down [during the hot weather] he started off for a certain fountain along with his attendants. When he got there he drank deeply and at once (according to the story), a fly entered his mouth, stuck to his throat, and could not be shifted by any device of the doctors: and as a result, the pope died.

— Burchard of Ursperg's Chronicon Urspergensis, c. 1159

Pope Adrian died in Anagni (Note: The 16th-century martyrologist John Foxe later said that this had been caused by the Pope choking on a fly.)—where he had retired for security against the Emperor—on 1 September 1159. He was buried in St Peter's on 4 September 1159.

One of his final acts was the blessing of his preferred successor, Bernard, Cardinal-Bishop of Porto, (Note: The letter of the law, as expressed by Cardinal Pietro Senex in 1130 that "there must be no mention of the successor before the Pope is buried", was widely ignored.) testified Eberhard, Bishop of Bamberg to the Conclave. The election of Bernard—as a candidate acceptable to the Emperor—may have avoided the future schism.

== Later events ==
The meeting between Hadrian and the city envoys of June 1159 may have discussed the next Papal election, as Adrian was known to have been accompanied by 13 cardinals who supported his pro-Sicilian policy. (Note: Anne Duggan, while acknowledging that there were a small number of cardinals who can be closely identified with either side, suggests that most of Adrian's officials were neither Imperialists or Sicilians.) Cardinal Roland's election to succeed Adrian saw both the conflict with the Empire intensify and the alliance with William of Sicily solidify. The schism had a knock-on effect with regard to Papal policy in Italy, making it little more than a passive observer to events on its own doorstep. Papal scholar Frederic Baumgartner argues that a disputed election was the inevitable consequence whenever pope and emperor had a falling out. Relations between Barbarossa and Manuel, already poor—Manuel saw his western counterpart as an "embarrassment", suggests Magdalino, after his falling out with Adrian—ended completely following the death of Manuel's German wife, Bertha of Sulzbach, earlier in 1159.

Following Adrian's death, comments Barber, "the consequence for the church was another long and bitter schism". Tensions between different parties led to a double election, with "mutually unacceptable candidates". This led to what Frank Barlow has called "disgraceful scenes" taking place in Rome, but, with neither side powerful enough to overcome the other, each appealed to the European powers.

Although the Papal forces were insufficient to defeat Barbarossa outright, the war in Lombardy gradually turned against the Emperor, and following the recognition of the Kings of France and England, the military situation became more evenly balanced. However, peace was not established between the Papacy, the Empire, Sicily and the Byzantine Emperor until Barbarossa was defeated at the Battle of Legnano in 1176 and the following year's Treaty of Venice. The schism continued until the election of Pope Alexander III in 1180. During this time the Emperor's chancery distributed a series of fake letters—some of which purported to have been written by Adrian—in defence of the Imperial candidate. One such letter, supposedly to Archbishop Hillin of Trier, comments Latowsky, "is of particular interest since it contains a deliberately erroneous rewriting of Charlemagne's assumption of the imperial title".In it, Adrian launches into a diatribe, condemning the German kings who owe everything to the Papacy yet refuse to understand that. This letter, argues Latowsky, was clearly intended to enrage its Imperial audience.

Another letter, from the Emperor to Archbishop, called Adrian's church as "a sea of snakes", a "den of thieves and a house of demons" and Adrian himself as "he who claims to be the Vicar of Peter, but is not". Adrian, in turn, says the Emperor is "out of his mind". Containing as they did summaries of each sides' arguments at Besançon, they are most interesting, argues Freed, for indicating what Barbarossa to have believed to have been the most important of his and Adrian's arguments.

From the time when friendship was established at Benevento between the lord Pope Hadrian and William of Sicily. contrary to the honour of God's Church and of the empire, great division and discord have arisen (not without cause) among the cardinals...blinded by money and many promises and firmly bound to the Sicilian, wickedly defended the treaty.

Further afield, war was threatening between England and France. Lands lost by Adrian to Sicily at the Treaty of Benevento were eventually regained by Pope Innocent III early in the next century, by which time the Kingdom of Sicily had merged with the Empire. (Note: The Papal lands would effectively stay this way until the annexation of the Papal States in 1870.) Innocent saw Adrian's original grant as detracting from the privilege of the Apostolic See, and made concerted and eventually successful efforts to evict the Empire from southern Italy.

=== 1159 papal election ===
The 1159 papal election was disputed, and the College of Cardinals split along sectarian lines, between the "Sicilian"—so-called as its members wished to continue the pro-William policy of Adrian—and "Imperial" sympathisers. The former supported the candidacy of Cardinal Roland; the latter that of Ottaviano de Monticelli. Roland was elected Pope Alexander III. The result was not accepted by his opponents, who elected an Antipope, Victor IV, (Note: Not to be confused with the Antipapacy of Cardinal Gregorio Conti, who had previously taken the title Victor IV in 1138.) whom John of Salisbury had previously mocked. The Imperial party disagreed with the new policy of rapprochement with Sicily and favoured the traditional alliance with the Empire. A missive of the Imperial party of electors claimed that Adrian was a "dupe" of the Sicilian faction within the cardinals. Indicative of Barbarossa's attitude towards his candidate was his willingness to serve Victor as he had objected to serving Adrian, for example by holding the Antipope's horse and kissing his feet.The conclave to elect Adrian's successor, says Ullmann, was a "riotous and undignified spectacle". Alexander was elected by two-thirds of the college, while Victor's support declined from nine to five cardinals. Two further antipopes were elected before Alexander's death in 1181 and a unity candidate was found. Alexander was left a problematic legacy by Adrian, who had guaranteed a powerful enemy for the Papacy in the Emperor. Alexander managed to negotiate successive crises, however, and held its own. Within a year, Emperor Manuel had recognised Alexander, as had the English King Henry, although the latter waited nine months to do so. (Note: Henry subsequently assumed that he had Alexander's backing vis a vis the English church as a quid pro quo for supporting his pontifical election. This was not, however, to be, and Alexander later condemned many of Henry's policies.) Although Octavian received less curial support in the conclave, he had the support of the Roman commune. As a result, Alexander and his supporters were forced into the sanctuary of the Leonine Borgho.

== Legacy and assessment ==
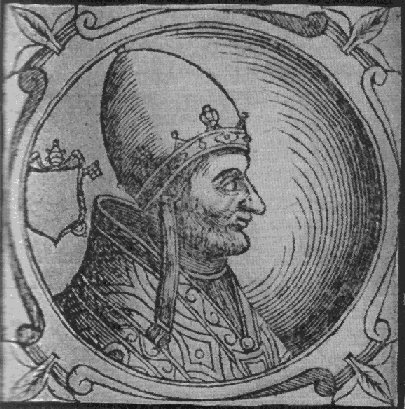
In the 14th century Adrian was recorded in St Albans' Book of Benefactors, which, suggests Bolton, "ensured that the memory of the English Pope would remain forever"

The archives of his pontificate are not extensive, but the picture emerges of an assiduous administrator, a man of strange vision and singular purpose, though of balanced judgement, who became something of a role model for later popes.

— Jane E. Sayers

In the 14th century Adrian was recorded in St Albans' Book of Benefactors, which, suggests Bolton, "ensured that the memory of the English Pope would remain forever". The 19th-century antiquarian Bishop Stubbs described Adrian IV as, in his view, "a great pope; that is a great constructive pope, not a controversial one, like those who preceded and followed". Walter Ullmann argues that Adrian's pontificate "left an imprint upon contemporary Europe which is not yet fully recognised".

One reviewer has described Adrian's pontificate as, traditionally, "largely remembered as the answer to a trivia question (who was the only English pope?) or as a footnote in Anglo-Irish history". On the other hand, the Dixie Professor of Ecclesiastical History, Christopher N. L. Brooke argues that, on account of the number of different countries he dwelt in over the years, he illustrates the cosmopolitan nature of 12th-century religion.

The timing of Adrian's pontificate, suggests Ullmann, was significant because it made him the first pope on which what Ullmann calls "newly released forces"—the recently crowned King Henry and Emperor Frederick. (Note: Ullmann labels Henry II and Frederick I "classic examples of the reinvigorated royalist-lay ideology".) On the other hand, argues Egger, Adrian—by rejecting the request of Kings Louis and Henry to crusade in Spain—undoubtedly prevented the secular power from embarrassing themselves: "one can only speculate about what might have happened, but it is not improbable that Adrian spared the Iberian peninsula a disaster on the scale of the second crusade to the East".

Morris argues that while "in a short pontificate, Hadrian did more than any of his predecessors to secure the papal position in central Italy...he was much less successful in his conduct of relations with the empire". Norwich too strikes a cautionary note. While agreeing that Adrian was "the greatest pope since Urban II", he argues that it would be difficult not to "tower...above the string of mediocrities who occupied the throne of St Peter during the first half of the century, just as he himself is overshadowed by his magnificent successor". Duggan argues that, although "the future of the papacy was to be determined by other men and other events, but he had played his part in guiding it securely through an extremely critical phase of its long history".

Ullmann has called Adrian "diplomatically very well versed and experienced, dispassionate and purposeful in his government". Adrian—"the pope of action", says Ullmann—was Papal theory "become eminently practical". He was not, however, a dictator. Likewise, suggests the historian Christopher Tyerman, Adrian's new approach to drumming up support for a crusade in 1157 became "a pivotal feature of crusading from the reign of Innocent III onwards". Innocent himself recognised the debt which he owed to Adrian's pontificate, argues Ullmann. Innocent codified Adrian's changes to the Imperial coronation as official procedure. Even the Besançon affair, suggests Ullmann, casts him in a positive light, and "by his dignified stand against Staufen attacks appears like a rock in comparison with the clamorous Germans".

The period immediately preceding Adrian's pontificate, argues Malcolm Barber, was one where "even without a direct imperial threat, Roman feuds, Norman ambitions and incompetently led crusades could reduce grandiose papal plans to ashes". The Papacy itself was one of permanent struggle and conflict, although scholars disagree as to the degree of culpability the papacy had for this. Duggan suggests that "no fair judgment should be reached without recognising the vulnerability" of the papacy itself. His policy, if he can be said to have one, she says, was shaped by events rather than shaping them. Ullmann argues that there was "a perfect concordance between Adrian's symbolic actions and his acts of government". Adrian and his pro-Scicillian cardinals, suggests Duggan, became scapegoats in 1159 for the subsequent conflict.

Sayers describes Adrian IV as "a true son of the reforming papacy". However, the Papal reform movement does not appear to have had faith that Adrian would carry out its program, as leading reformers of the day—such as Gerhoh of Reichersberg and Hildegard of Bingen, for example—sought the church's renewal other ways. Chris Wickham credits Adrian with beginning the process by which the popes expanded their Patrimony. Adrian brought Rome brought back under firm Papal control—with considerable success, argues Wickham, and also expanded the Papal estate around the city, particularly in the northern Lazio region.

Although his Papacy was shorter than either Eugenius III or Alexander III he bought more castles and lordships within papal jurisdiction than either of them, and in a more onerous political context. He was also a tougher pope than his two immediate predecessors, says Wickham and his was an "extremely formative" Papacy, says Sayers, and his policy of reform was a legacy taken up again by reforming popes of the 13th century. His Papacy though, suggests Eden, was "fraught with political intrigue and conflict". Adrian has been described as having "theocratic pretensions", although it was also during his pontificate that the term "Vicar of Christ" became a common synonym for the Pope.

Henry Summerson suggests that on his death, Adrian "left a high reputation", and quotes the Dictionary of National Biography in saying that he also became "something of a role model for later popes". The scholar Michael Frassetto suggests that blame for the poor relations between Adrian and Frederick can be placed as much upon their advisors—Roland and Reinald specifically—who both "stressed principle over compromise". Summerson also notes that although England provided no subsequent popes, relations between that country and the Papacy remained strong after Adrian's death and into the 13th century. (Note: Culminating, suggest Summerson, after King John made the country a Papal fief in 1215.) Adrian's generous treatment of St Albans also had repercussions. He had granted it privileges of such breadth and grandeur—which were confirmed by his successors—that they caused rancour and jealousy in the English church.

Ullman suggests that it was Adrian who began the restoration of the Papal monarchy that would reach its apotheosis under Innocent III, while Bolton argues that "only Innocent, the great Roman, realised the value to the papacy of following where Adrian, the unique Englishman, had led".

Nicholas Breakspear School in St Albans, England, built in 1963, is named in his honour.

During King Charles III's state visit to the Holy See in 2025, the King directed the UK Ambassador to place roses at the tomb of Pope Adrian IV. King Charles paused at the mosaic of Pope Adrian for a quiet moment of reflection at the Basilica of Saint Paul Outside the Walls.

== See also ==
- List of popes
- List of popes by country
- Cardinals created by Adrian IV

== Bibliography ==
- Abulafia, D. (1988). Frederrick II: A Medieval Emperor. Oxford: Oxford University Press. ISBN 978-0-19508-040-7.
- Andås, M. S.; Ekroll, Ø.; Haug, A.; Petersen, N. H. (2007). "Introduction". The Medieval Cathedral of Trondheim: Architectural and Ritual Constructions in Their European Context. Ritus et Artes: Traditions and Transformations. Vol. III. Turnhout: Brepols. p. 120. ISBN 978-2-50352-301-9.
- Baird, J. L.; Ehrman, J. K., eds. (1994). The Letters of Hildegard of Bingen. Vol. I. Oxford: Oxford University Press. ISBN 978-0-19535-297-9.
- Balard, M. (2007). "Latin Sources and Byzantine Prosopography: Genoa, Venice, Pisa and Barcelona". In WhitbyM. (ed.). Byzantines and Crusaders in Non-Greek Sources, 1025-1204. Oxford University Press/British Academy. p. 3958. ISBN 978-0-19726-378-5.
- Barber, M. (1992). The Two Cities: Medieval Europe, 1050-1320. London: Routledge. ISBN 978-0-41509-682-9.
- Barlow, F. (1936). "The English, Norman, and French Councils Called to Deal with the Papal Schism of 1159". The English Historical Review. 51: 264–268. doi:10.1093/ehr/LI.CCII.264. OCLC 754650998.
- Barrow, G. W. S. (1994). "The Date of the Peace between Malcolm IV and Somerled of Argyll". The Scottish Historical Review. 73 (2): 222–223. doi:10.3366/shr.1994.73.2.222. OCLC 664601468.
- Barstow, A. L. (1982). Married Priests and the Reforming Papacy: The Eleventh-century Debates. Lewiston, NY: E. Mellen. ISBN 978-0-88946-976-1.
- Baumgartner, F. J. (2003a). "'I Will Observe Absolute and Perpetual Secrecy': The Historical Background of the Rigid Secrecy Found in Papal Elections". The Catholic Historical Review. 89 (2): 165–181. doi:10.1353/cat.2003.0097. OCLC 222885361. S2CID 159513966.
- Baumgartner, F. J. (2003b). Behind Locked Doors: A History of the Papal Elections. Basingstoke: Palgrave Macmillan. ISBN 978-1-13711-014-5.
- Beck, A. (1940). "The Rise and Fall of Catholic Sweden". Studies: An Irish Quarterly Review: 382–394. OCLC 220720325.
- Benedictine Charter (2020). "Ohannes Berardi, Chartularium Monasterii Casauriensis, Ordinis S. Benedicti". Gallica/BnF.
- Bergquist, A. (2003). "The Papal Legate: Nicholas Breakspear's Scandinavian Mission". In Bolton, B.; Duggan, A. (eds.). Adrian IV, the English Pope, 1154–1159: Studies and Texts. Aldershot: Ashgate. pp. 41–48. ISBN 978-0-75460-708-3.
- Birk, J. C. (2016). Norman Kings of Sicily and the Rise of the Anti-Islamic Critique: Baptized Sultans. Cham: PalgraveMacmillan. ISBN 978-3-31947-041-2.
- Birkett, H. (2010). "The Struggle for Sanctity: St Waltheof of Melrose, Cistercian in-house Cults and Canonisation Procedure at the Turn of the Thirteenth Century". In Boardman, S.; Williamson, E. (eds.). The Cult of Saints and the Virgin Mary in Medieval Scotland. Studies in Celtic History. Vol. 28. Woodbridge: Boydell & Brewer. p. 4360. ISBN 978-1-84383-562-2.
- Blumenthal, U. (2004). "The Papacy, 1024–1122". In Luscombe, D.; Riley-Smith, J. (eds.). The New Cambridge Medieval History. Vol. 4: 1024–1198, II. Cambridge: Cambridge University Press. pp. 8–38. ISBN 978-0-52141-411-1.
- Bellomo, E. (2008). The Templar Order in North-west Italy: (1142 – C. 1330). Leiden: Brill. ISBN 978-9-00416-364-5.
- Bolton, B. (2003a). "St Albans' Loyal Son". In Bolton, B.; Duggan, A. (eds.). Adrian IV, the English Pope, 1154–1159: Studies and Texts. Aldershot: Ashgate. pp. 75–104. ISBN 978-0-75460-708-3.
- Bolton, B. (2003b). "Nova Familia Beati Petri: Adrian IV and the Patrimony". In Bolton, B.; Duggan, A. (eds.). Adrian IV, the English Pope, 1154–1159: Studies and Texts. Aldershot: Ashgate. pp. 157–180. ISBN 978-0-75460-708-3.
- Bolton, B.; Duggan, A., eds. (2003). Adrian IV, the English Pope, 1154–1159: Studies and Texts. Aldershot: Ashgate. ISBN 978-0-75460-708-3.
- Boswell, J. (1980). Christianity, Social Tolerance, and Homosexuality: Gay People in Western Europe from the Beginning of the Christian Era to the Fourteenth Century. Chicago: University of Chicago Press. ISBN 978-0-22634-536-9.
- Breakspear School (2022). "History of the School". Nicholas Breakspear Catholic School.
- Brooke, C. N. L. (1989). The English Church and the Papacy, From the Conquest to the Reign of John (3rd ed.). Cambridge: Cambridge University Press. ISBN 978-0-52107-390-5.
- Brooke, C. N. L. (2003). "Adrian IV and John of Salisbury". In Bolton, B.; Duggan, A. (eds.). Adrian IV, the English Pope, 1154–1159: Studies and Texts. Aldershot: Ashgate. pp. 3–14. ISBN 978-0-75460-708-3.
- Broun, D. (2007). Scottish Independence and the Idea of Britain: From the Picts to Alexander III. Edinburgh: Edinburgh University Press. ISBN 978-0-74868-520-2.
- Brown, G. S. (2015). The Norman Conquest of Southern Italy and Sicily. Jefferson, NC: McFarland. ISBN 978-0-78645-127-2.
- Cameron, A. (2016). Arguing it Out: Discussion in Twelfth-Century Byzantium. The Natalie Zemon Davis Annual Lectures. Budapest: Central European University Press. ISBN 978-9-63386-112-7.
- Charter (2020). "Chartularium Sangallense 03 (1004–1277) Nr. 915, S. 35-37". monasterium.net.
- Chrysostomides, J. (2009). "The Byzantine Empire from the Eleventh to the Fifteenth Century". In Fleet, K. (ed.). The Cambridge History of Turkey. Vol. I: Byzantium to Turkey, 1071–1453. Cambridge: Cambridge University Press. pp. 6–50. ISBN 978-0-52162-093-2.
- Collins, R. (5 November 2009). Keepers of the Keys of Heaven: A History of the Papacy. London: Orion. ISBN 978-1-47460-334-8.
- Constable, G. (1953). "The Second Crusade as seen by Contemporaries". Traditio. 9: 213–279. doi:10.1017/S0362152900003743. OCLC 795988691. S2CID 151590776.
- Dodwell, C.R. (1982). Anglo-Saxon Art, A New Perspective. Manchester: Manchester University Press. ISBN 978-0-71900-926-6.
- Daniel, E. R. (2004). "Abbot Joachim of Fiore and the Conversion of the Jews". In MyersS. E.MacMichaelS. J. (ed.). The Friars and Jews in the Middle Ages and Renaissance. London: Brill. p. 122. ISBN 978-9-00411-398-5.
- Duggan, A. (2003a). "Totius Christianitatis Caput: The Pope and the Princes". In Bolton, B.; Duggan, A. (eds.). Adrian IV, the English Pope, 1154–1159: Studies and Texts. Aldershot: Ashgate. pp. 105–156. ISBN 978-0-75460-708-3.
- Duggan, A. (2003b). "Servus Servorum Dei". In Bolton, B.; Duggan, A. (eds.). Adrian IV, the English Pope, 1154–1159: Studies and Texts. Aldershot: Ashgate. pp. 181–210. ISBN 978-0-75460-708-3.
- Duggan, A. (2004). "Thomas Becket's Italian Network". In Andrews, F.; Egger, C.; Rousseau, C. M. (eds.). Pope, Church and City: Essays in Honour of Brenda M. Bolton. The Medieval Mediterranean. Vol. 56. Leiden: Brill. pp. 177–201. ISBN 978-9-00414-019-6.
- Duggan, A. (2007). "Henry II, the English Church and the Papacy, 1154–76". In Harper-Bill, C.; Vincent, N. (eds.). Henry II: New Interpretations. Woodbridge: Boydell. pp. 154–183. ISBN 978-1-84383-340-6.
- Eden, B. L. (2006). "Hadrian IV, Pope (c. 1100–1159, R. 1154–1159)". In Emmerson, R. K. (ed.). Key figures in Medieval Europe: An Encyclopedia. London: Routledge. pp. 292–293. ISBN 978-0-41597-385-4.
- Egger, C. (2003). "The Canon Regular: Saint-Ruf in Context". In Bolton, B.; Duggan, A. (eds.). Adrian IV, the English Pope, 1154–1159: Studies and Texts. Aldershot: Ashgate. pp. 15–28. ISBN 978-0-75460-708-3.
- Frame, R. (1989). "England and Ireland, 1171-1399". In JonesM.ValeM. (ed.). England and Her Neighbours, 1066-1453: Essays in Honour of Pierre Chaplais. London: Hambledon. pp. 139–156. ISBN 978-1-85285-014-2.
- Frassetto, M. (2001). "Feudalism". In Jeep, J. M. (ed.). Medieval Germany: An Encyclopedia. New York: Garland. pp. 295–296. ISBN 978-0-82407-644-3.
- Freed, J. B. (2016). Frederick Barbarossa: The Prince and the Myth. New Haven: Yale University Press. ISBN 978-0-30012-276-3.
- Godman, P. (2000). The Silent Masters: Latin Literature and Its Censors in the High Middle Ages. Princeton, New Jersey: Princeton University Press. ISBN 978-1-40082-360-4.
- Godman, P. (2014). The Archpoet and Medieval Culture. Oxford: Oxford University Press. ISBN 978-0-19102-996-7.
- Hakkenberg, M. A. (2004). "Book Review". Church History. 73: 212–213. OCLC 795961781.
- Heather, P. J. (2014). The Restoration of Rome: Barbarian Popes and Imperial Pretenders. Oxford: Oxford University Press. ISBN 978-0-19936-851-8.
- Hegarty, N. (2011). The Story of Ireland. London: Random House. ISBN 978-1-84607-970-2.
- Hosler, J. (2007). Henry II: A Medieval Soldier at War, 1147–1189. Leiden: Brill. ISBN 978-9-04741-934-1.
- J. A. H. (1926). "A Bull of Pope Adrian IV". The British Museum Quarterly. 1 (3): 74–75. doi:10.2307/4420772. JSTOR 4420772. OCLC 810961271.
- Jong, J. L. de (2013). The Power and the Glorification: Papal Pretensions and the Art of Propaganda in the Fifteenth and Sixteenth Centuries. State College: Penn State Press. ISBN 978-0-27105-079-9.
- Kostick, C. (2013). Strongbow: The Norman Invasion of Ireland. Dublin: O'Brien Press. ISBN 978-1-84717-607-3.
- Latowsky, A. A. (2013). Emperor of the World: Charlemagne and the Construction of Imperial Authority, 800–1229. Ithaca, New York: Cornell University Press. ISBN 978-0-80146-778-3.
- Loud, G. A. (2004). "Norman Sicily in the Twelfth Century". In Luscombe, D.; Riley-Smith, J. (eds.). The New Cambridge Medieval History. Vol. 4: 1024–1198, II. Cambridge: Cambridge University Press. pp. 442–474. ISBN 978-0-52141-411-1.
- Loud, G. A. (2010). The Crusade of Frederick Barbarossa: The History of the Expedition of the Emperor Frederick and Related Texts. Crusade Texts in Translation. Vol. 19. Farnham: Ashgate. ISBN 978-1-40948-090-7.
- Loud, G. (2012). Roger II and the Creation of the Kingdom of Sicily. Manchester: Manchester University Press. ISBN 978-0-71908-202-3.
- Luscombe, D.; Riley-Smith, J., eds. (2004). "Sources". The New Cambridge Medieval History. Vol. 4: 1024–1198, II. Cambridge: Cambridge University Press. pp. 769–789. ISBN 978-0-52141-411-1.
- Madden, T. F. (2007). Enrico Dandolo and the Rise of Venice. Baltimore, MD: Johns Hopkins University. ISBN 978-0-80189-184-7.
- Madden, T. F. (2012). Venice: A New History. London: Penguin. ISBN 978-1-10160-113-6.
- Madden, T. F. (2018). "Oaths Broken, Yet Fulfilled: Venice, Innocent III and the Patriarchate of Constantinople". In Bird, J. L.; Smith, D. (eds.). The Fourth Lateran Council and the Crusade Movement: The Impact of the Council of 1215 on Latin Christendom and the East. Outremer: Studies in the Crusades and the Latin East. Vol. 7. Turnhout: Brepols. p. 5976. ISBN 978-2-50358-088-3.
- Magdalino, P. (1993). The Empire of Manuel I Komnenos, 1143–1180. Cambridge: Cambridge University Press. ISBN 978-0-52152-653-1.
- Magdalino, P. (2004). "The Byzantine Empire, 1118–1204". In Luscombe, D.; Riley-Smith, J. (eds.). The New Cambridge Medieval History. Vol. 4: 1024–1198, II. Cambridge: Cambridge University Press. pp. 611–643. ISBN 978-0-52141-411-1.
- Magdalino, P. (2008). "The Empire of the Komnenoi (1118–1204)". In Shepard, J. (ed.). The Cambridge History of the Byzantine Empire c.500–1492. Cambridge: Cambridge University Press. pp. 627–663. ISBN 978-0-52183-231-1.
- Martindale, J. (1989). "Succession and Politics in the Romance-speaking World, c. 1000-1140". In Jones, M.; Vale, M. (eds.). England and Her Neighbours, 1066-1453: Essays in Honour of Pierre Chaplais. London: Hambledon. pp. 19–42. ISBN 978-1-85285-014-2.
- Matthew, D. (1992). The Norman Kingdom of Sicily. Cambridge: Cambridge University Press. ISBN 978-0-52126-911-7.
- Maxwell-Stuart, P. G. (1997). Chronicle of the Popes: The Reign-by-reign Record of the Papacy from St. Peter to the Present; with 308 Illustrations, 105 in Color. London: Thames and Hudson. ISBN 978-0-50001-798-2.
- McBrien, R. P. (1997). Lives of the Popes: The Pontiffs from St. Peter to John Paul II. London: HarperCollins. ISBN 978-0-06065-304-0.
- McCrank, L. J. (1978). "The Foundation of the Confraternity of Tarragona by Archbishop Oleguer Bonestruga, 1126–1129". Viator. 9: 157–168. doi:10.1484/J.VIATOR.2.301544. OCLC 466287118.
- Metcalfe, A. (2009). Muslims of Medieval Italy. Edinburgh: Edinburgh University Press. ISBN 978-0-7486-2911-4.
- Millor, W. J.; Butler, C. N. L. (1986). The Letters of John of Salisbury: The Early Letters (1153–1161). Vol. I (repr. ed.). Oxford: Clarendon Press. ISBN 978-0-19822-239-2.
- Morris, C. (1989). The Papal Monarchy: The Western Church from 1050 to 1250. Oxford: Clarendon Press. ISBN 978-0-19152-053-2.
- Musolff, A. (2004). Metaphor and Political Discourse: Analogical Reasoning in Debates about Europe. Basingstoke: PalgraveMacmillan. ISBN 978-0-23050-451-6.
- Norden, W. (1904). Das Papsttum Und Byzanz: Die Trennung Der Beiden Mächte Und Das Problem Ihrer Wiedervereinigung Bis Zum Untergange Des Byzantinischen Reichs (1453). Vol. repr. Breslau: Aderholz. OCLC 29115447.
- Norgate, K. (1893). "The Bull Laudabiliter". The English Historical Review. 8: 18–52. OCLC 754650998.
- Norwich, J. J. (1970). The Kingdom in the Sun, 1130-1194. Harlow: Longmans. ISBN 978-0-58212-735-7.
- Norwich, J. J. (1995). Byzantium: The Decline and Fall. London: Penguin. ISBN 0-6708-2377-5.
- Norwich, J. J. (2011). Absolute Monarchs: A History of the Papacy. London: Random House. ISBN 978-0-67960-499-0.
- Nuremberg Chronicle (2020). "Registrum Huius Operis Libri Cronicarum Cu Figuris Et Ymagibus Ab Inicio Mudi, Nuremberge". Digitale Biblothek.
- Oldfield, P. (2014). Sanctity and Pilgrimage in Medieval Southern Italy, 1000-1200. New York: Cambridge University Press. ISBN 978-1-10700-028-5.
- Oliver, L. M. (1945). "Rowley, Foxe, and the Faustus Additions". Modern Language Notes. 60 (6): 391–394. doi:10.2307/2911382. JSTOR 2911382. OCLC 818888932.
- Partner, P. (1972). The Lands of St. Peter: The Papal State in the Middle Ages and the Early Renaissance. Berkeley: University of California Press. ISBN 978-0-52002-181-5.
- Palgrave, F. (1921). Palgrave, R. H. I. (ed.). The History of Normandy and of England. Vol. IV. Cambridge: Cambridge University Press. OCLC 863472518.
- Parry, M. (1997). Chambers Biographical Dictionary. New York: Chambers. ISBN 978-0-55014-220-7.
- Phelpstead, C., ed. (2001). A History of Norway, and the Passion and Miracles of Blessed Óláfr. Viking Society for Northern Research Texts. Vol. XIII. Exeter: Viking Society for Northern Research/University College London. ISBN 978-0-90352-148-2.
- Pixton, P. B. (2001). "Reich". In Jeep, J. M. (ed.). Medieval Germany: An Encyclopedia. New York: Garland. pp. 727–728. ISBN 978-0-82407-644-3.
- Poole, R. L. (1902). "Two Unpublished Letters of Hadrian IV (1155)". The English Historical Review. 17: 704–706. doi:10.1093/ehr/XVII.LXVIII.704. OCLC 754650998.
- Poole, R. L. (1969). Poole, A. L. (ed.). Studies in Chronology and History (2nd ed.). Oxford: Clarendon. OCLC 469762970.
- Powell, J. M., ed. (March 2004). The Deeds of Pope Innocent III. Washington, DC: Catholic University of America Press. ISBN 978-0-81321-488-7.
- Reynolds, P. L. (2016). How Marriage Became One of the Sacraments: The Sacramental Theology of Marriage from its Medieval Origins to the Council of Trent. Cambridge Studies in Law and Christianity. Cambridge: Cambridge University Press. ISBN 978-1-10714-615-0.
- Richter, M. (1974). "The First Century of Anglo-Irish Relations". History. 59 (195): 195–210. doi:10.1111/j.1468-229X.1974.tb02214.x. OCLC 1058045311.
- Robinson, I. S. (1996). The Papacy, 1073–1198: Continuity and Innovation. Cambridge Medieval Textbooks (repr. ed.). Cambridge: Cambridge University Press. ISBN 978-0-52131-922-5.
- Robinson, I. S. (2004). "The Papacy, 1122–1198". In Luscombe, D.; Riley-Smith, J. (eds.). The New Cambridge Medieval History. Vol. 4: 1024–1198, II. Cambridge: Cambridge University Press. pp. 317–383. ISBN 978-0-52141-411-1.
- Rotondo-McCord, J. (2001). "Feudalism". In Jeep, J. M. (ed.). Medieval Germany: An Encyclopedia. New York: Garland. pp. 283–284. ISBN 978-0-82407-644-3.
- Round, J. H. (1899). The Commune of London: And Other Studies. London: Archibald Constable. OCLC 226653845.
- J. G. Rowe. 'Hadrian IV. the Byzantine empire and the Latin oricnt' in Essay: in medieval historypmenud lo Bertie Wilkinson ed. T. A. Sandquist and M. R. Powickc (T oronto. 1969) pp. 9–12
- Sayers, J. E. (2004). "Adrian IV [Real Name Nicholas Breakspear] (d. 1159), Pope". Oxford Dictionary of National Biography (online ed.). Oxford University Press. doi:10.1093/ref:odnb/173. (Subscription, Wikipedia Library access or UK public library membership required.)
- Schaff, P. (1994). History of the Christian Church, Volume. Vol. V: The Middle Ages, AD. 1049-1294 (repr. ed.). Grand Rapids, Michigan: Eerdmans. ISBN 978-1-61025-044-3.
- Sheehy, M. P. (1961). "The Bull 'Laudabiliter': A Problem in Medieval Diplomatique and History". Journal of the Galway Archaeological and Historical Society: 45–70. OCLC 646197004.e
- Singleton, F. (1998). A Short History of Finland. Cambridge: Cambridge University Press. ISBN 978-0-52164-701-4.
- Sjåvik, J. (2008). Historical Dictionary of Norway. Historical Dictionaries of Europe. Vol. 62. Plymouth: Scarecrow Press. ISBN 978-0-81086-408-5.
- Smith, D. J. (2003). "The Abbot-Crusader: Nicholas Breakspear in Catalonia". In Bolton, B.; Duggan, A. (eds.). Adrian IV, the English Pope, 1154–1159: Studies and Texts. Aldershot: Ashgate. pp. 29–39. ISBN 978-0-75460-708-3.
- Strickland, M. (13 September 2016). Henry the Young King, 1155-1183. New Haven: Yale University Press. ISBN 978-0-30021-955-5.
- Stubbs, W. (1887). Seventeen Lectures on the Study of Medieval and Modern History and Kindred Subjects. Oxford: Clarendon Press. OCLC 893023936.
- Summerson, H. (2004). "Adrian IV: England's Only Pope". Oxford Dictionary of National Biography (online ed.). Oxford University Press. doi:10.1093/ref:odnb/92730. Archived from the original on 2 June 2018. (Subscription, Wikipedia Library access or UK public library membership required.)
- Tabacco, G. (2004). "Northern and Central Italy in the Twelfth Century". In Luscombe, D.; Riley-Smith, J. (eds.). The New Cambridge Medieval History. Vol. 4: 1024–1198, II. Cambridge: Cambridge University Press. pp. 422–441. ISBN 978-0-52141-411-1.
- Treadgold, W. T. (1997). A History of the Byzantine State and Society. Stanford, California: Stanford University Press. ISBN 978-0-80472-630-6.
- Twyman, S. E. (2003). "Summus Pontifex: The Ritual and Ceremonial of the Papal Court". In Bolton, B.; Duggan, A. (eds.). Adrian IV, the English Pope, 1154–1159: Studies and Texts. Aldershot: Ashgate. pp. 49–74. ISBN 978-0-75460-708-3.
- Tyerman, C. (1998). The Invention of the Crusades. New York: Macmillan International. ISBN 978-1-34926-541-1.
- Ullmann, W. (1955). "The Pontificate of Adrian IV". Cambridge Historical Journal. 11 (3): 233–252. doi:10.1017/S147469130000305X. OCLC 72660714.
- Ullmann, W. (2003). A Short History of the Papacy in the Middle Age (2nd ed.). London: Routledge. ISBN 978-0-41530-227-2.
- Vasiliev, A. A. (1973). History of the Byzantine Empire, 324–1453. Vol. II (repr. ed.). Madison, Wisconsin: University of Wisconsin Press. OCLC 470963340.
- Whalen, B. E. (2014). The Medieval Papacy. European History in Perspective. New York: Macmillan International. ISBN 978-1-13737-478-3.
- Wickham, C. (2015). Medieval Rome: Stability and Crisis of a City, 900-1150. Oxford: Oxford University Press. ISBN 978-0-19968-496-0.
- Wieruszowski, H. (1969). "The Norman Kingdom of Sicily and the Crusades". In Setton, K. M.; Wolff, R. L.; Hazard, H. W (eds.). The Later Crusades, 1189-1311. A History of the Crusades. Vol. II (repr. ed.). Madison: University of Wisconsin Press. pp. 2–43. OCLC 929432181.
- Zinn, G. A. (1995). "Regular Canons". In Kibler, W. W. (ed.). Medieval France: An Encyclopedia. New York: Garland. pp. 1481–1482. ISBN 978-0-82404-444-2.

Catholic Church titles
Preceded by Pietro Papareschi	Bishop of Albano; 1149–1154	Succeeded by Walter II of Albano
Preceded by Anastasius IV	Pope; 1154–1159	Succeeded by Alexander III
