= Treaty of Constance (1153) =

1153 treaty between the Papacy and Holy Roman Empire

The First Treaty of Constance was signed between the Emperor Frederick I and Pope Eugene III in 1153. By the terms of the treaty, the Emperor was to prevent any action by Manuel I Komnenos to reestablish the Byzantine Empire on Italian soil and to assist the pope against his enemies in revolt in Rome. In 1155, as part of the agreement securing his imperial coronation, Frederick reaffirmed the terms of Constance for Pope Adrian IV. The Second Treaty of Constance made peace between the Emperor and the Lombard League in 1183.

== Sources ==
- Norwich, John Julius. The Kingdom in the Sun 1130-1194. Longmans: London, 1970.
