= Corchiano =

- Comune
- Comune di Corchiano
- Coat of arms

- Location within Italy Location within Lazio
- Coordinates: 42°20′45″N 12°21′23″E
- Country: Italy
- Region: Lazio
- Province: Viterbo (VT)

Government
  - Mayor: Antonio Galletta

Area
  - Total: 33.03 km^{2} (12.75 sq mi)
- Elevation: 196 m (643 ft)

Population (30 June 2017)
  - Total: 3,804
  - Density: 115.2/km^{2} (298.3/sq mi)
- Time zone: UTC+1 (CET)
  - Summer (DST): UTC+2 (CEST)
- Postal code: 01030
- Dialing code: 0761
- Patron saint: St. Blaise
- Saint day: February 3
- Website: Official website

Corchiano is a town and comune in the province of Viterbo, Lazio, central Italy. It was an ancient settlement of the Faliscans and, in the Renaissance and later, a fief of the Farnese family.

The local produce is hazelnuts and wine. Annual sagre include a live re-enactment of the birth of Jesus performed during Advent.

In the summer, a park not far from the centre of the village stays open very late, and the town has several restaurants.
