= Federico Cornaro (died 1382) =

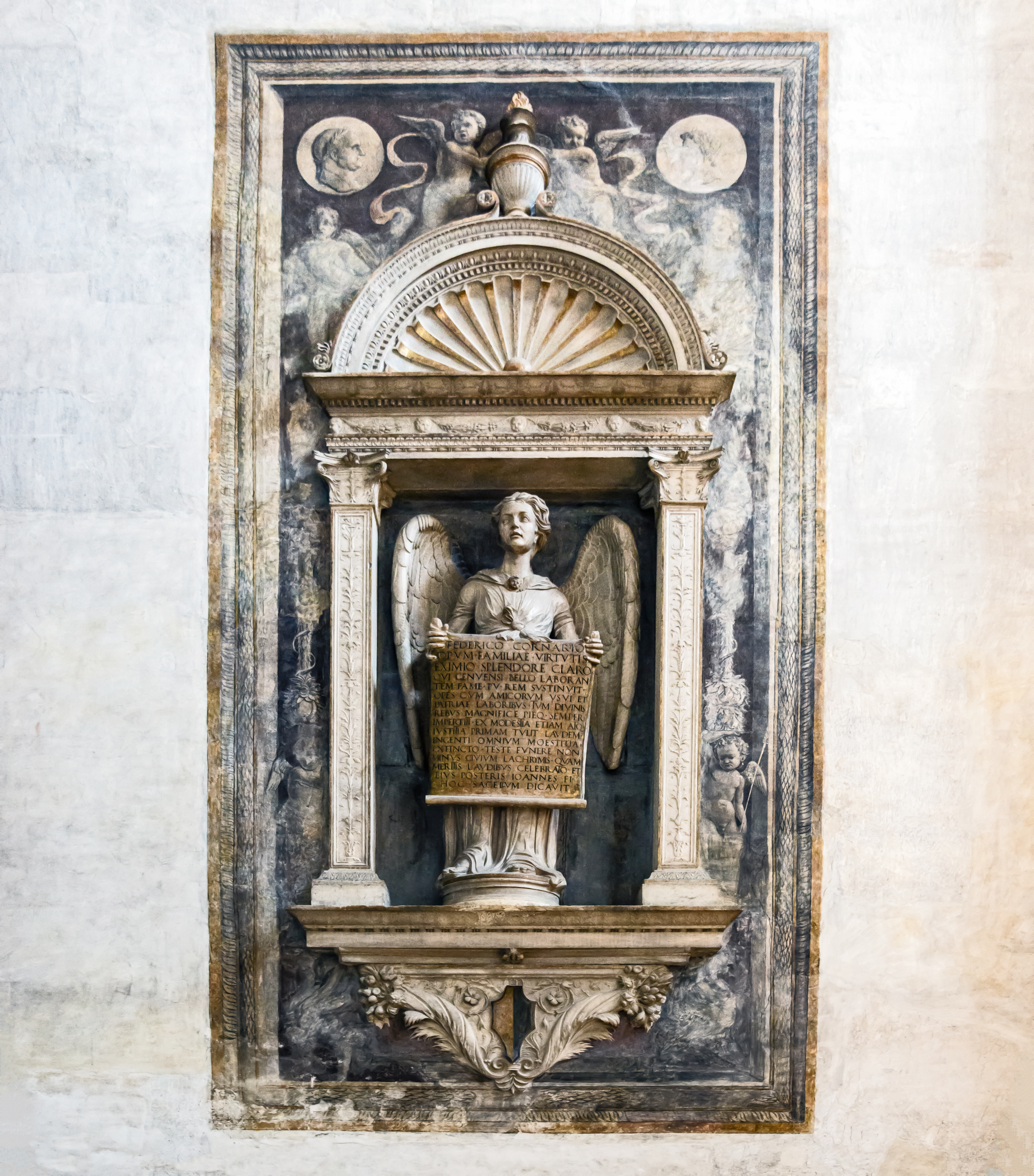
Funerary monument to Federico Cornaro in the Santa Maria Gloriosa dei Frari

Federico Cornaro or Corner (died 1382) was a 14th-century Venetian patrician, merchant and politician. In 1379, he was accounted the richest man in Venice, having become wealthy from his sugar plantations in Cyprus. He used this wealth to buy his son a marriage with the heiress of the Lordship of Argos and Nauplia in Greece, which he de facto ruled in their name until his death.

== Relations with the Kingdom of Cyprus ==
The exact date of his birth and his early career are unknown, and difficult to reconstruct due to the presence of namesake figures of the wider House of Cornaro at the same time. Around the middle of the 14th century, he bought the palazzo now known as the Ca' Loredan, which today houses the municipal council of Venice. There he hosted Albert III, Duke of Austria during his visit in 1361, as well as King Peter I of Cyprus from a short while after. The latter event resulted in a close relationship between the two men. Federico received lands and honours—membership in Peter's Order of the Sword, the right to add the Lusignan arms to his own, and the fief of Episkopi in southern Cyprus—while in exchange in 1365, during another royal visit to Venice, Federico gave the King a loan of 60,000 ducats. Before his departure for the Alexandrian Crusade, King Peter named Federico as his procurator general in his relations with Venice. Federico also undertook, along with his brothers, to pay an annual sum of 5,000 gold florins to Mary of Enghien, the widow of Guy of Lusignan.

The fief of Episkopi, granted with a complete tax exemption as Peter was unable to repay his loans, was soon developed into the major centre for sugar production aimed for the Venetian market. To consolidate his numerous business interests on Cyprus, Federico founded a trading company with his brothers Fantino (who served as its resident agent in Cyprus) and Marco, and with Vito Lion.

The trade with Cyprus, and particularly Episkopi, became the cornerstone of Federico's commercial success; by 1379, he was accounted the richest man in Venice. The Cypriot kings remained insolvent, and a few years after his death, Federico's heirs obtained the kingdom's salt pans from James I of Cyprus. A branch of the Cornaro family settled in Cyprus and became known as the "Cornaro della Piscopia".

== Involvement in Venetian politics ==
Along with his commercial activities, Federico Cornaro was also active in Venetian politics. In 1368 he was one of the electors of Doge Andrea Contarini, and served as ambassador to Holy Roman Emperor Charles IV. In July 1372 he was included in a zonta of thirty patricians to the Council of Ten, convened to debate the Republic's stance against Francesco I da Carrara, lord of Padua. Once war was decided upon, he was named to a commission of five 'sages' charged with financing the war.

In March 1376 he was elected as one of the ambassadors meant to mediate between Florence and the Holy See, but the mission did not materialize in the end. In November he was sent to Padua to inform its lord of the conclusion of a peace between Venice and the Kingdom of Hungary. In 1377 he was member of a commission of ten patricians convened to negotiate with the King of Aragon, as well as of a five-member board of 'sages' on reducing public expenditure. By confusion with his namesake of the Sant'Aponal branch, he has sometimes been erroneously named as participating in the negotiations for the marriage of Peter II of Cyprus with Valentina Visconti. He did however host Visconti and her entourage before they sailed for Cyprus.

In 1378, he was sent, along with Giovanni Bembo, as ambassador to Milan, with the aim of convincing its ruler, Bernabò Visconti, of allying with Venice in the War of Chioggia against the Republic of Genoa. In March 1379, he was sent as ambassador to Ferrara. He apparently remained there for the duration of the war, providing supplies for his besieged home city. His influence, especially with Amadeus VI, Count of Savoy, helped end the war in the Treaty of Turin, which among other things guaranteed his commercial interests in Cyprus.

Federico Cornaro served again as ambassador to Francesco I da Carrara, then in a zonta of twenty to the Venetian Senate, and in early 1382 on another embassy to Niccolò II d'Este, Marquis of Ferrara. In April 1382, he was sent to Cyprus to mediate between King Peter II and the Genoese. He returned to Venice in June, just in time to be one of the electors of Doge Michele Morosini.

== Acquisition of Argos and Nauplia ==
Being one of the wealthiest Venetian patricians, Federico could afford to conduct his own foreign policy. As part of his entrepreneurial activities in the East, he arranged the marriage of his son Pietro to Maria of Enghien, Lady of Argos and Nauplia in southern Greece, in 1377. Maria of Enghien and Pietro Cornaro were both still young when they became lords of Argos and Nauplia. In the first years of their reign, they resided in Venice, and Federico acted on their behalf, securing permissions from the Venetian government to send supplies or arm a galley to defend the lordship. Even after Pietro left for Nauplia himself following his father's death, the two cities were considered by the Venetian Senate as "more or less as Venetian possessions". By 1394, both cities also passed formally into the possession of the Venetian Republic.

== Death and burial ==
Federico died in late 1382, being survived by his wife Bianca and two sons, Giovanni and Pietro. In accordance to his will, composed in 1378, he was buried next to his brother Marco in the church of Santa Maria Gloriosa dei Frari. His son Giovanni built a funeral chapel for him there in 1417.

== Sources ==
- Luttrell, Anthony (1966). "The Latins of Argos and Nauplia: 1311-1394". Papers of the British School at Rome. 34. British School at Rome: 34–55. doi:10.1017/S0068246200007455. JSTOR 40310660. S2CID 179112752.
- Ravegnani, Giorgio (1983). "CORNER, Federico". Dizionario Biografico degli Italiani (in Italian). Vol. 29: Cordier–Corvo. Rome: Istituto dell'Enciclopedia Italiana. ISBN 978-88-12-00032-6.
