= 1388 =

1388 in various calendars
- Gregorian calendar: 1388; MCCCLXXXVIII
- Ab urbe condita: 2141
- Armenian calendar: 837; ԹՎ ՊԼԷ
- Assyrian calendar: 6138
- Balinese saka calendar: 1309–1310
- Bengali calendar: 794–795
- Berber calendar: 2338
- English Regnal year: 11 Ric. 2 – 12 Ric. 2
- Buddhist calendar: 1932
- Burmese calendar: 750
- Byzantine calendar: 6896–6897
- Chinese calendar: 丁卯年 (Fire Rabbit); 4085 or 3878 — to — 戊辰年 (Earth Dragon); 4086 or 3879
- Coptic calendar: 1104–1105
- Discordian calendar: 2554
- Ethiopian calendar: 1380–1381
- Hebrew calendar: 5148–5149
- Hindu calendars
- Vikram Samvat: 1444–1445
- Shaka Samvat: 1309–1310
- Kali Yuga: 4488–4489
- Holocene calendar: 11388
- Igbo calendar: 388–389
- Iranian calendar: 766–767
- Islamic calendar: 789–790
- Japanese calendar: Kakei 2 (嘉慶２年)
- Javanese calendar: 1301–1302
- Julian calendar: 1388; MCCCLXXXVIII
- Korean calendar: 3721
- Minguo calendar: 524 before ROC 民前524年
- Nanakshahi calendar: −80
- Thai solar calendar: 1930–1931
- Tibetan calendar: མེ་མོ་ཡོས་ལོ་ (female Fire-Hare); 1514 or 1133 or 361 — to — ས་ཕོ་འབྲུག་ལོ་ (male Earth-Dragon); 1515 or 1134 or 362

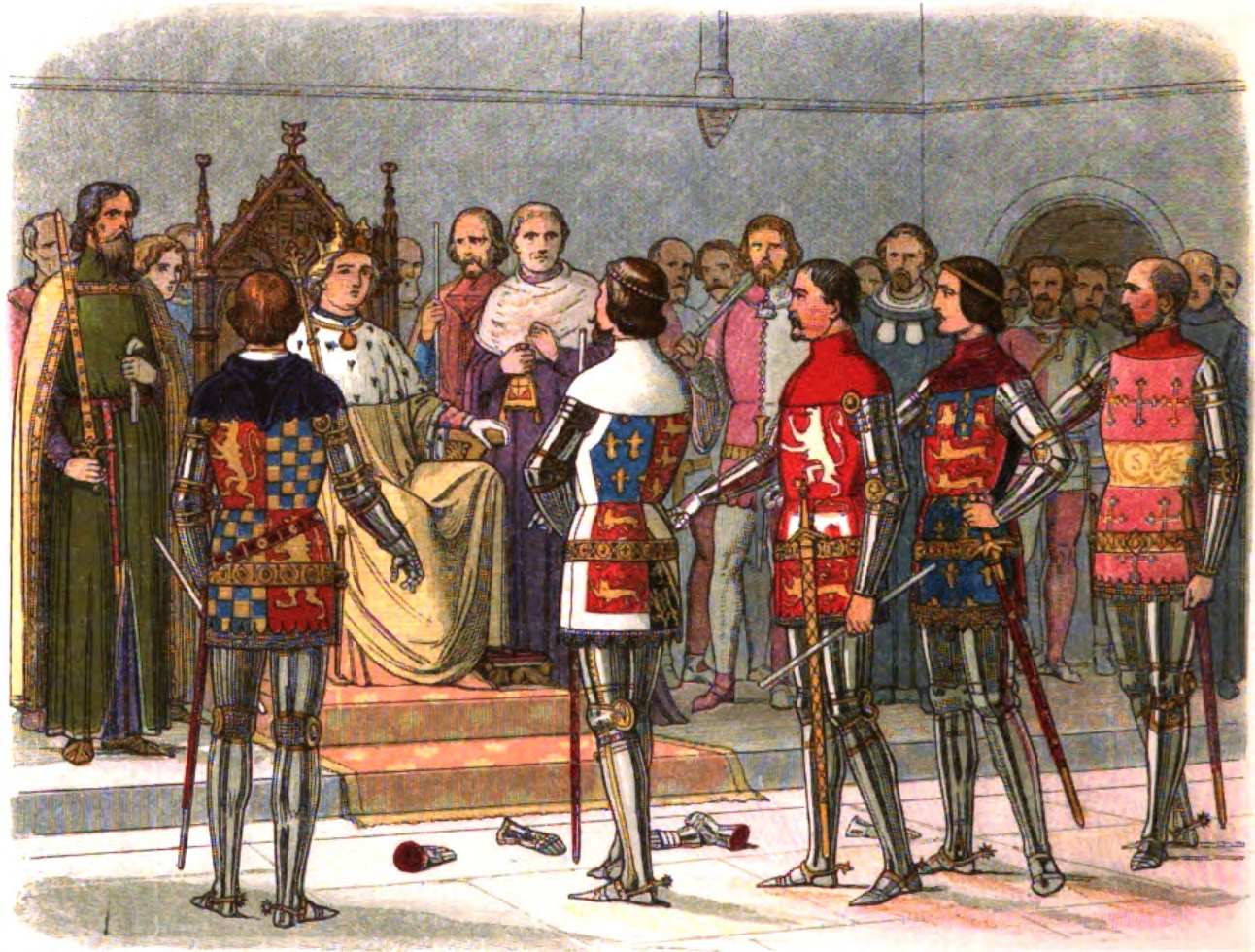
February 3: The five Lords Appellant ruling England block King Richard II from speaking at the "Merciless Parliament".

Year 1388 (MCCCLXXXVIII) was a leap year starting on Wednesday (link will display full calendar) of the Julian calendar.

== Events ==
=== January–March ===
- January 24 – Eleanor of Arborea, regent for her son Marianus V of the independent Judicate of Arborea, on the island of Sardinia, signs a peace agreement with the Crown of Aragon in Spain, ending a war between the two nations.
- February 2 – Queen Margaret I of Denmark is proclaimed the Queen of Norway after the death of her son, Olav IV Haakonsson.
- February 3 – The five Lords Appellant, regents for King Richard II open a new session of the House of Commons and the House of Lords with the goal of exposing King Richard's attempt to make peace with France in order to drive them from power. After hearing the case of the Lords Appellant, the Parliament convicts five of King Richard's associates— Lord Chancellor Michael de la Pole; London's former Lord Mayor Nicholas Brembre; Duke of Ireland Robert de Vere; Archbishop of York Alexander Neville; and Chief Justice Robert Tresilian— guilty of ""living in vice, deluding the said king" and embracing the mammon of iniquity for themselves".
- February 19 – Chief Justice Robert Tresilian, one of the five advisors to King Richard convicted of treason in absentia, is discovered hiding in sanctuary at Westminster and is dragged by a mob into the Parliament. Because he was already convicted, Tresilian is hanged in publicon the same day.
- February 20 – London's Lord Mayor Bembre is hanged in public at Tyburn after having been imprisoned in the Tower of London.
- March 12 – Pope Urban VI issues a papal bull permitting the Lithuanian capital, Vilnius, to establish a cathedral, acknowledging that pagan objects have been discarded and that Christianity has come to the Baltic nation.

=== April–June ===
- April 9 – At the Battle of Näfels, the Canton of Glarus, in alliance with the Old Swiss Confederacy, decisively defeats the Duchy of Austria and the Habsburgs, despite being outnumbered 16 to one.
- May 18 –
  - At the Battle of Buyur Lake, an invasion force from Ming dynasty China, under General Lan Yu defeats a large Mongolian army led by Uskhal Khan Tögüs Temür, and captures 100 members of the Northern Yuan Dynasty. Uskhal Khan will be killed later while trying to escape. The invading Chinese army destroys Karakorum, the capital of the Mongol Empire.
  - Cozia Monastery is consecrated in the Principality Wallachia by Prince Mircea the Elder in the town of Călimănești (now in Romania)
- May 21 – Permission to create the University of Cologne is granted to the city of Köln by Pope Urban VI. By the 21st century it will be the largest university in Germany.
- May 22 – Wihwado Retreat: In Korea, General Yi Song-gye disregards the orders of the Emperor U of Goryeo to attack China, leads his troops away from Wihwa Island, and leads an attack on the Korean capital, Kaesong.
- June 3 – General Yi Song-gye overthrows the Emperor U of Goryeo and installs U's son, Chang of Goryeo, as the new Emperor.
- June 4 – The Merciless Parliament ends its session after four months spent primarily in trying officials for treason and further restricting the authority of King Richard II.

=== July–September ===
- July 8 –John of Gaunt, the uncle of Richard II of England, makes peace with Castile and gives up his claim to the Castilian throne, by allowing his daughter Catherine of Lancaster to marry Prince Henry, the eldest son of John I of Castile.
- August 5 – Battle of Otterburn: A Scottish army, led by James Douglas, defeats an English army, capturing their leader, Harry Hotspur. Douglas is killed during the battle.
- August 27 – Battle of Bileća: The Bosnians check the Ottoman advance.
- September 17 –The title of Prince of Asturias is created for the heir to the Spanish Crown, initially by King Juan of Castile for his son Enrique.
- September 9 – The 16th Parliament of King Richard II, the first since the adjournment of the Merciless Parliament, opens at the Barnwell Priory in Cambridge for a five-week session, during which the members bring their complaints against the Lords Appellant.
- September 20 –Ghiyas-ud-Din Tughluq II succeeds Firuz Shah Tughlaq as Sultan of Delhi.

=== October–December ===
- October 17 – The Cambridge Parliament adjourns.
- November 18 – Uskhal Khan Tögüs Temür, the Emperor of the Northern Yuan dynasty in Mongolia, is killed by the Ming Chinese General Jorightu Khan Yesüder, who becomes the new Emperor.
- December 3 –Upon reaching the age of 20, Charles VI of France takes complete control of the government, ending the regency of his uncle, Philip the Bold.
- December 12 – Maria of Enghien sells the Lordship of Argos and Nauplia to the Republic of Venice.
- December 27 – At Thăng Long, Tran Ngung overthrows and kills Tran Hien as Emperor of Dai Viet (now Vietnam).

=== Date unknown ===
- Mircea I of Wallachia takes control of the region of Dobruja, thus preventing its occupation by the Ottomans.
- Petru of Moldavia receives Pokuttya, as a pawn for a loan to the Polish king.
- The revision of Wycliffe's Bible is completed by John Purvey, and Wyclif's followers, known as the Lollards, begin to be persecuted in England.
- Ramesuan is reinstated as King of Ayutthaya (modern-day southern Thailand), after dethroning and executing 17-year-old King Thong Lan.
- Goryeo Revolution: General Yi Seong-gye begins a four year revolution in Goryeo (modern-day Korea), after being ordered by King U of Goryeo to attack the superior Chinese army. King U is forced from power, and replaced by his son Chang.
- Omar I is succeeded by Sa'id, as King of the Kanem-Bornu Empire (modern-day east Chad and Nigeria). Sa'id is succeeded in the same year by Kade Alunu. Omar and Sa'id are both killed by Bilala invaders from the west.
- Ljubostinja Monastery is built in Serbia.

== Births ==
- September 14 – Claudius Clavus, Danish geographer
- date unknown
  - Juliana Berners, English writer
  - Thomas of Lancaster, Duke of Clarence, second son of Henry IV of England (d. 1421)
  - Thomas Montagu, 4th Earl of Salisbury (d. 1428)
  - Dai Jin, Chinese painter (d. 1462)
  - Yiğit Şahiner, Turkish musician, historian

== Deaths ==
- March 4 – Thomas Usk, English author
- August 14 – James Douglas, 2nd Earl of Douglas (killed in battle)
- July 15 – Agnes of Durazzo, titular Latin empress consort of Constantinople (d. 1313)
- August 15 – Adalbertus Ranconis de Ericinio, Bohemian theologian
- date unknown
  - Simon de Burley, Lord Warden of the Cinque Ports
  - Sultan Firuz Shah Tughlaq of Delhi
  - Uskhal Khan, Emperor Tianyuan of Northern Yuan
