= Andrea Cappello =

Venetian nobleman, merchant, banker and politician (c. 1444-1493)

Andrea Cappello (c. 1444 – 24 August 1493) was a Venetian nobleman, merchant, banker, and politician.

== Family and early life ==
He was born most likely in Venice, a son of the distinguished statesman Vettore Cappello and Lucia Querini. According to the genealogies of Marco Barbaro, he was born in 1444, but the records of the family indicate that he was born a few years later. As a youth, he was engaged in his family's mercantile activities, spending time abroad, possibly in London or Bruges. In 1470, he married the daughter of the future Doge of Venice, Marco Barbarigo, Marina. Andrea also pursued legal studies, since in some documents he is qualified as a lawyer, and he apparently also had a taste for scholarly matters, since he chose as tutor to his son the young, and as yet unknown, humanist Marino Becichemo.

In 1480, along with his brothers Alvise and Paolo, and with Tommaso Lippomano, he opened a private bank in Venice; the establishment quickly earned the good will of the Signoria of Venice by advancing payment for the city's ambassador to Genoa, and for sponsoring the dispatch of soldiers to Corfu. A part of the proceeds of the fiscal chamber of Vicenza was assigned as collateral. The bank quickly established itself as one of the major financial enterprises of its kind, alongside the Soranzo, Garzoni, and Pisani banks. The Venetian economy was in a precarious situation, however, partly due to constant military expenses. The Cappello brothers retired from the business in 1485, leaving their partner, Lippomano, to lead the bank to bankruptcy in 1499; at which time Lippomano remained in debt to the Cappello for the sum of 13,600 ducats.

== Political activity ==
Although tied to the Barbarigo family through his wife, when Marco Barbarigo died in 1486, Andrea Cappello and his brothers sided with the new patrician houses (the curti, "short ones") against the candidate of the old patrician families (the longhi, "long ones"). Although the former's candidate, Marco's brother Agostino Barbarigo, was elected to the Dogate, this only served to rally the new houses even more against the longhi. Even after the new Doge made an impassioned speech in favour of concord in the Great Council, Cappello passed a list of the 24 old patrician families to Andrea Barbaro, with a recommendation to vote for none of their candidates in the other magistracies of the Republic. This was brought to the attention of Barbarigo, but the informant, after indelicately alluding to the extraordinary fact of brother succeeding brother, found himself in exile, while Cappello, perhaps shielded by his family ties, suffered no consequences.

== Embassy to the Holy See ==
As a member of the Venetian Senate, and a man of "grand experience", he was unanimously elected on 7 February 1492 to replace Girolamo Donà as ambassador to the Holy See. He was accompanied to Rome by the newly elected ambassador to Ferdinand I of Naples, Niccolò Michiel, entering the city on 26 May. With the death of Pope Innocent VIII soon after, his mission acquired new importance, as the selection of a new pope could tilt the precarious political balance in Italy. Cappello played the diplomatic game well, publicly affirming the impartiality of the Republic, while being an active participant in the backroom dealings prior to the conclave, as well as in the affair of the eligibility of the Patriarch of Venice, Maffeo Gherardi, as a voting member of the conclave.

The election of Rodrigo Borgia as Pope Alexander VI was little to the Republic's liking, but four ambassadors extraordinary were sent to pay homage to him, and work alongside Cappello. Over the next months, Cappello participated in several papal ceremonies, occupying a place of honour, such as during the reception of the Ottoman ambassador on 10 June 1493, when he took first place among the ambassadors to the Holy See. His main preoccupation during that time was the conclusion of a new agreement linking the Pope, Venice, and Milan. Despite the initial reluctance of the Signoria, in April a defensive league between the three parties was concluded in the Camera Nova of the Apostolic Palace, with the provision for invitations to be sent to all Italian states to adhere to it. A further clause guaranteed the possession of Milan by Ludovico Sforza. Only a few days after its publication on 25 April, however, the situation in Italy changed when the intention of Charles VIII of France to claim the Kingdom of Naples became known. The league was effectively disbanded, even though on 11 June Cappello received instructions to allow the adherence of the Duchy of Ferrara to it.

Cappello did not live to see the deluge of the French invasion of Italy in the First Italian War, dying in Rome on 24 August 1493. He was replaced by Paolo Pisani, who arrived in the city on 19 December. Cappello was brought back to Venice for burial, but it is not certain whether he was buried in the church of Sant'Elena, where his father was buried.

== Sources ==
- Tucci, T. (1975). "CAPPELLO, Andrea". Dizionario Biografico degli Italiani, Volume 18 (in Italian).
