= Cornaro family =

Venetian patrician family

Arms of the Cornaro family

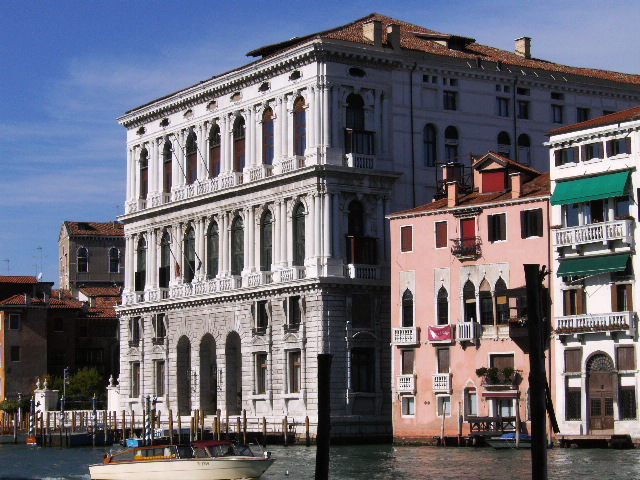
Ca' Corner, one of eight palaces along Venice's Grand Canal commissioned by the Cornaro family.

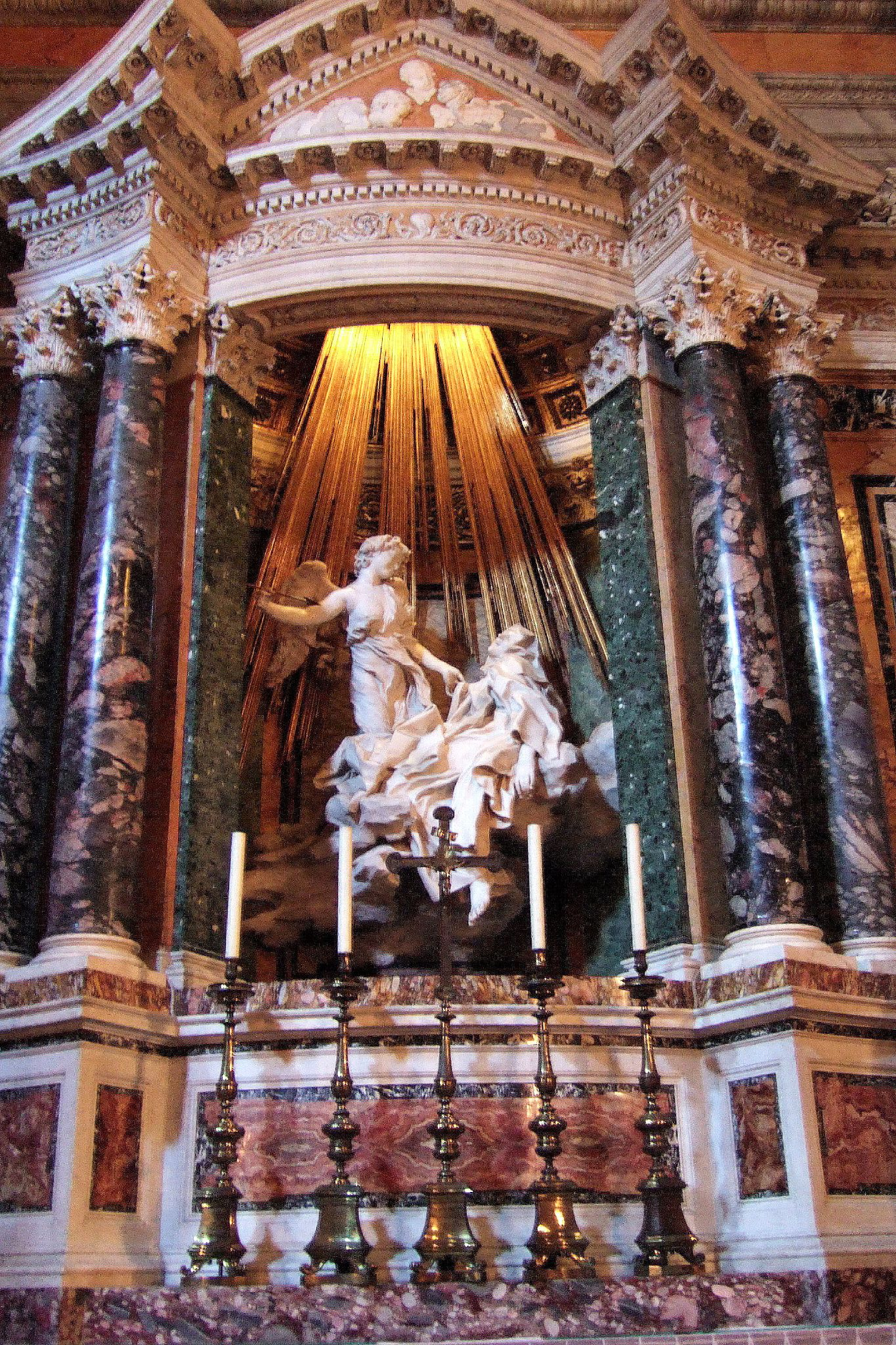
Bernini's Ecstasy of Saint Theresa in the Cornaro family chapel in the church of Santa Maria della Vittoria, Rome.

The House of Cornaro or Corner was a patrician family in the Republic of Venice which included many doges and other high officials. The name Corner, originally from the Venetian language, was adopted in the eighteenth century. The older standard Italian Cornaro is no longer common in Italian sources referring to earlier members of the family, but remains so in English.

== History ==
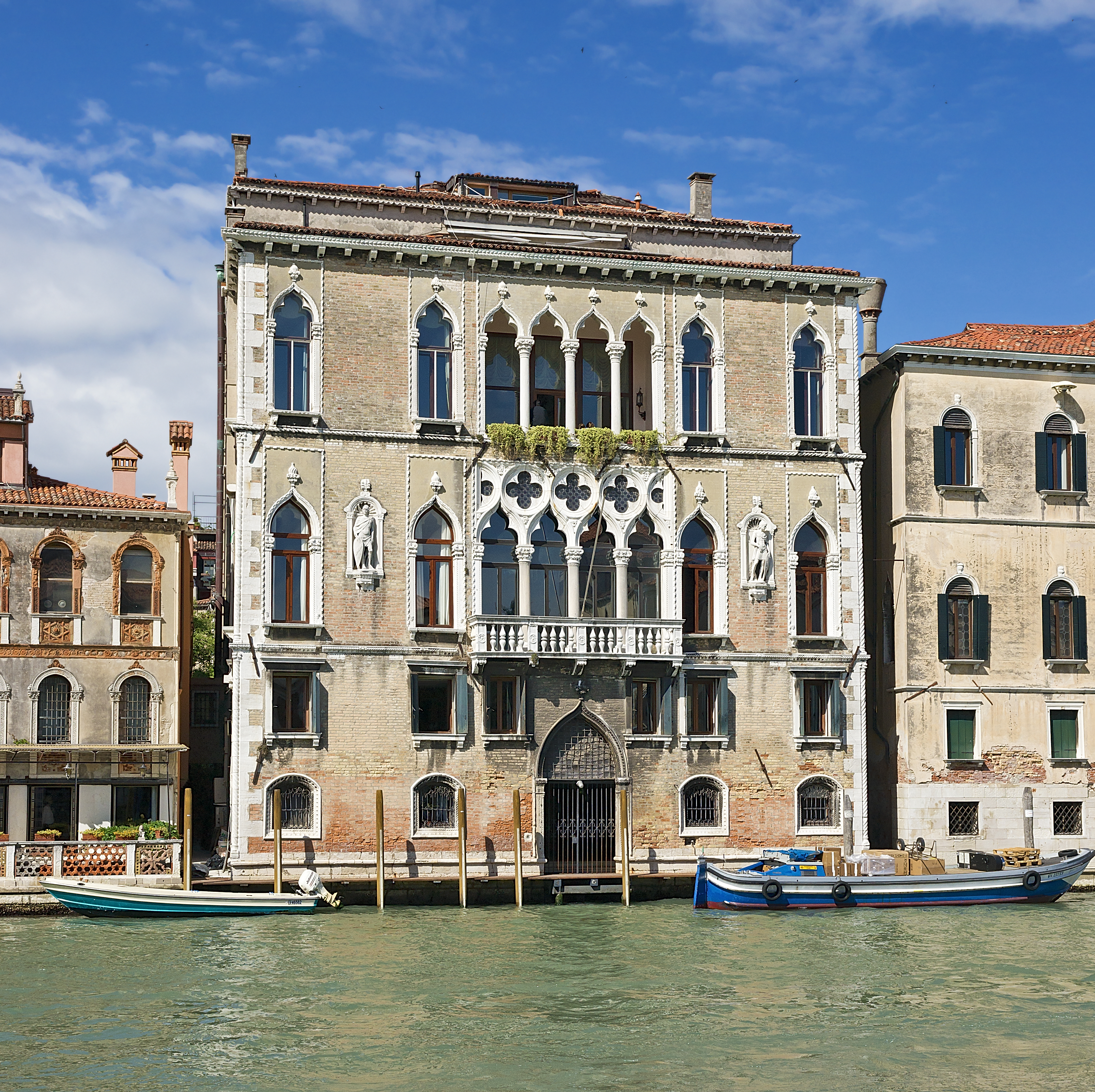
Palazzo Loredan dell'Ambasciatore, Venice

The family and name Cornaro are said to descend from the gens Cornelia, a patrician family of Ancient Rome. The Cornari were among the twelve tribunal families of the Republic of Venice and provided founding members of the Great Council in 1172. In the 14th century, the family separated into two distinct branches, Cornaro of the Great House and Cornaro Piscopia. The latter name derived from the 1363 grant of the fief of Piscopia in the Kingdom of Cyprus to Federico Cornaro.

When Caterina Cornaro married king James II of Cyprus in 1468, the Lusignan royal arms were added to the family arms party per pale. They had eight palaces on the Grand Canal, Venice at different times, including Ca' Corner and what is now the Palazzo Loredan dell'Ambasciatore. They commissioned many famous monuments and works of art, including Bernini's Ecstasy of St Theresa in the Cornaro Chapel of Santa Maria della Vittoria, Rome (1652). In Greece the islands of Scarpanto and Kasos were their fiefs from the early 14th century until the Ottoman conquest.

== Sugar trade ==
The Cornaro Piscopias ran a large sugar plantation in their fief near Episcopi in Venetian Cyprus, in which they exploited slaves of Syrian or Arab origin or local serfs. Sugar was transformed in-house with a large copper boiler made in Venice that the family paid hefty sums to maintain and operate. They exported sugarloaves and powdered sugar to Europe. The Cornaros were often in conflict with their neighbors over the use and handling of water.

== Members ==
- Felicia Cornaro (died 1111), dogaressa of Venice
- Giovanni Cornaro (fl. 1238–1291), diplomat
- Andrea Cornaro (died 1323), Margrave of Bodonitsa
- Marco Cornaro (c.1286–1368), doge 1365–68
- Federico Cornaro (died 1382), merchant and politician, founder of the Piscopia plantation
- Pietro Cornaro (died in 1387 or 1388), Lord of Argos and Nauplia from 1377
- Marco Cornaro (1406–1479), trader, patrician, diplomat
- Luigi Cornaro (c.1464–1566), who wrote treatises on dieting
- Giorgio Cornaro (1452–1527), brother of Caterina Cornaro
- Caterina Cornaro (1454–1510), Queen of Cyprus from 1474 to 1489
- Francesco Cornaro (1476–1543), Cardinal from 1527
- Marco Cornaro (1482–1524), cardinal from 1522
- Andrea Cornaro (cardinal) (1511–1551), Italian Roman Catholic bishop of Brescia, and later cardinal
- Giorgio Cornaro (1524–1578), Italian Roman Catholic Bishop of Treviso
- Federico Cornaro (1531–1590), Italian Roman Catholic Cardinal-Priest of Santo Stefano al Monte Celio
- Luigi Cornaro (cardinal), Italian Roman Catholic cardinal and Archbishop of Zadar
- Andrea Cornaro (historian) (1547–c.1616), Venetian aristocrat, historian and author
- Vitsentzos Kornaros (1553–1614), Cretan poet
- Marco Cornaro (1557–1625), Italian Roman Catholic prelate who served as Bishop of Padua
- Cardinal Federico Baldissera Bartolomeo Cornaro (1579–1653), Patriarch of Venice 1631–44
- Giovanni I Cornaro (1551–1629), doge from 1624
- Marco Antonio Cornaro (1583–1639), Italian Roman Catholic Bishop of Padua
- Francesco Corner (1585–1656), doge in 1656
- Elena Cornaro Piscopia (1646–1684), first woman to get a Doctor of Philosophy degree (from the University of Padua in 1678)
- Giovanni II Cornaro (1647–1722), doge from 1709
- Giorgio Cornaro (cardinal) (1658–1722), cardinal from 1697
- Laura Cornaro (d.1739), dogaressa of Venice, by marriage to the Doge Giovanni II Cornaro
- Giovanni Cornaro (1720–1789), cardinal from 1778
