= Ca' Loredan =

Former palace in Venice, Italy

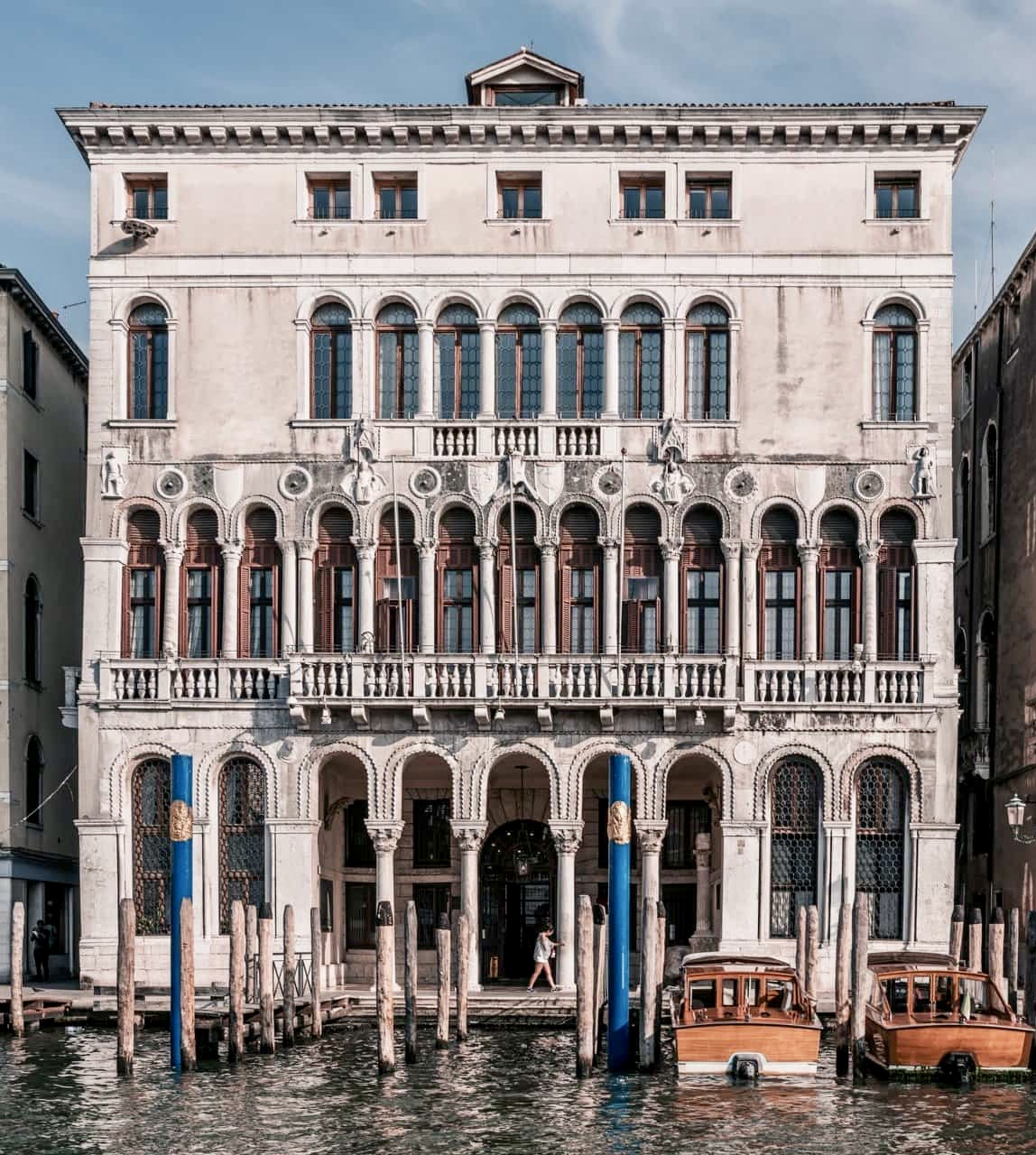
- Ca' Loredan on the Grand Canal
- Interactive map of the Ca' Loredan area

General information
- Architectural style: Romanesque
- Location: San Marco 4122, Venice, Italy
- Completed: 13th century
- Renovated: 1881
- Owner: City of Venice
- Affiliation: House of Loredan

Technical details
- Floor count: 4

Ca' Loredan is a 13th-century Romanesque-style former palace of the Loredan family located on the Grand Canal in Venice, northern Italy. It is located in the sestiere (district) of San Marco and faces the Grand Canal, not far from the Rialto Bridge. Together with the annexed Ca' Farsetti, it is currently home to the city's municipal council.

== History ==
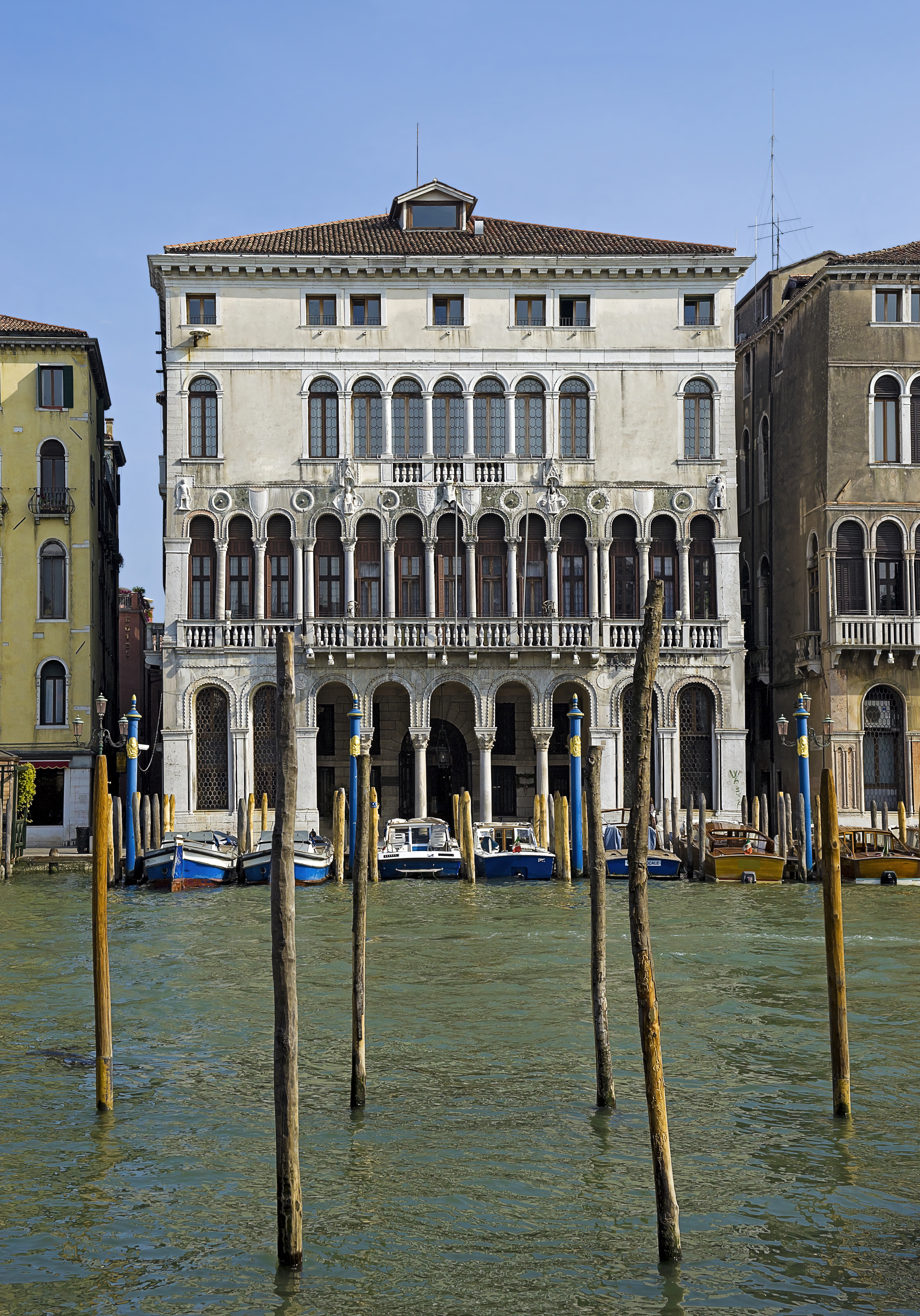
Ca' Loredan on the Grand Canal

Ca' Loredan was built in the 13th century as a Venetian-Byzantine fondaco for the Boccasi family, which died out in the 15th century. According to some historians, it became the residence of Doge Jacopo Contarini after he retired to private life, and passed to the Zane family. In the following centuries it was enlarged and heavily modified, by the Cornaro Piscopia family, who took possession of it during the fourteenth century according to the will of Federico Corner, the richest merchant of his time. The most significant restructuring was carried out during the sixteenth century. In 1646, Elena Lucrezia Cornaro Piscopia was born there, a philosopher, who went down in history for being the first female graduate in history: she received this title on 25 June 1678. The event, which had a wide international impact, is commemorated by a marble plaque. In 1703 it became the home of the Loredan family, who obtained it thanks to a marriage between a daughter of Girolamo Corner and Giovanni Battista Loredan. It became the property of Countess Campagna Peccana in 1816 and was transformed into a hotel. In 1867 it passed to the municipality of Venice and became the seat of the city hall together with Ca' Farsetti.

== Architecture ==
Ca' Loredan is a building whose oldest nucleus is in the Venetian-Byzantine style, being among the buildings on the Grand Canal that most preserve its traces despite the renovations. The ground floor has a central portico closed by five raised arches, supported by four Corinthian columns, above which, on the noble floor, there is a heptaphora (seven windows) in the same style. On the two sides of the portico, symmetrically, there are two round windows, which correspond to a three-light window on the main floor. This hole is closed by mostly circular Byzantine decorations. The second piano nobile, which, albeit at the rear, attempts to emulate the style of the first, is characterized by a large central multi-lancet window, echoed by lateral single-lancet windows. The building, whose right side is characterized by the presence of numerous single lancet windows and the earth portal, is distinguished by having four overpasses that connect it to Ca' Farsetti. At the rear, it has a long courtyard that separates the two secondary wings: numerous arched openings overlook it and it houses various wells. The main floor contains the Council Hall, which houses works of art by Benedetto Caliari, Gregorio Lazzarini and Bonifazio Veronese.

== Use in fiction ==
This is one of the potential locations of the Banco di Niccolò in Dorothy Dunnett's House of Niccolò series.

== Bibliography ==
- Marcello Brusegan, La grande guida dei monumenti di Venezia. Rome, Newton & Compton, 2005. ISBN 88-541-0475-2.
- Guida d'Italia – Venezia. 3ª ed. Milan, Touring Editore, 2007. ISBN 978-88-365-4347-2.
- Marcello Brusegan, I Palazzi di Venezia, Rome, Newton & Compton, 2007, ISBN 978-88-541-0820-2.
