= Barzizza =

Barzizza is an Italian surname. Notable people with the surname include:

- Gasparino Barzizza (c. 1360–c. 1431), Italian grammarian and teacher
- Isa Barzizza (1929–2023), Italian actress
- Pippo Barzizza (1902–1994), Italian arranger, composer, conductor, and music director

== Other ==
- Palazzo Barzizza, Gothic-style palace located on the Canal Grande of Venice
