= Sant'Elena, Venice =

Gothic church in Castello, Venice, Italy

Sant'Elena
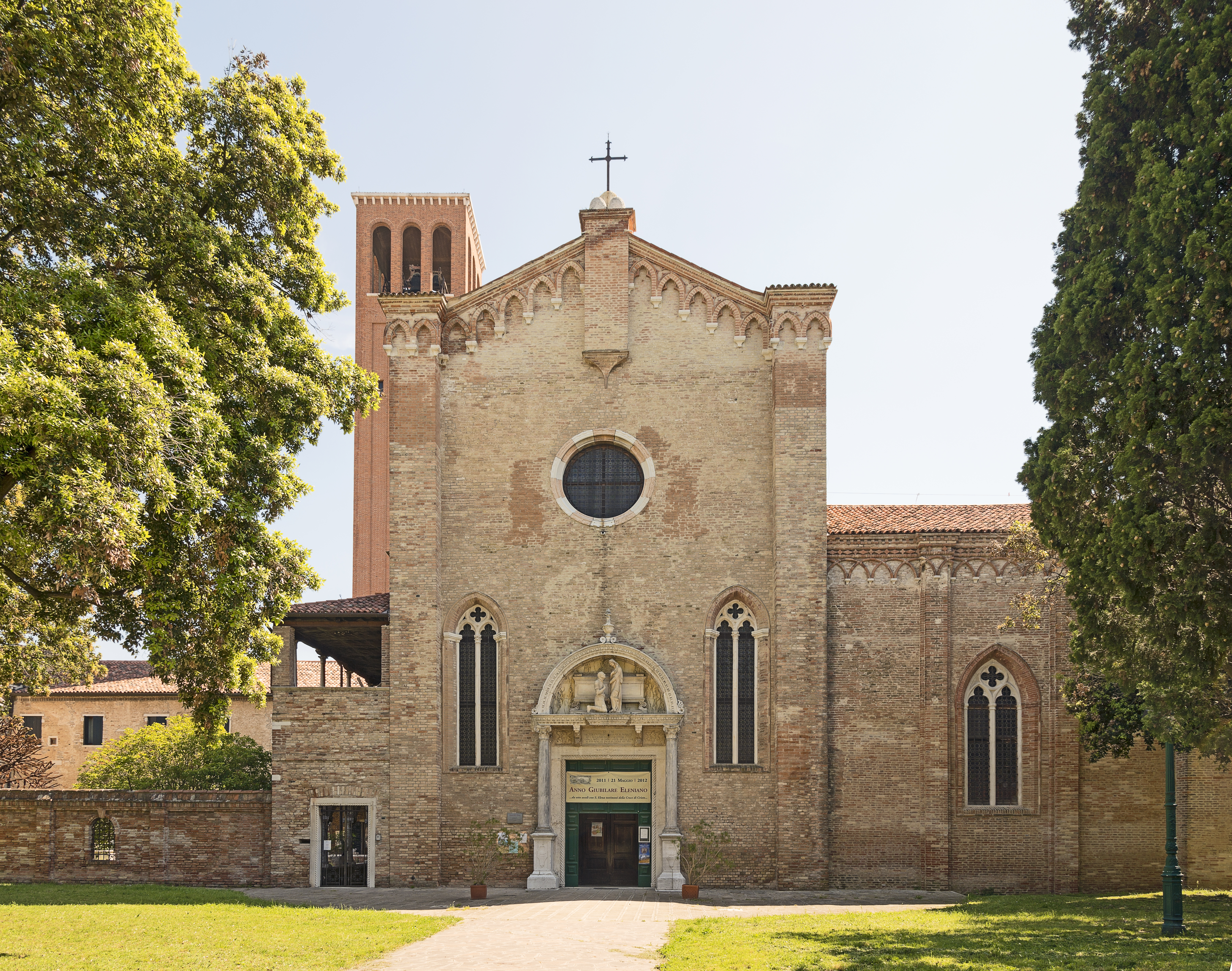
- Facade of Sant'Elena

- Location within Venice Location within Italy

Religion
- Affiliation: Roman Catholic
- Province: Venice

Location
- Location: Venice, Italy
- Interactive map of Sant'Elena
- Coordinates: 45°25′38″N 12°21′57″E

Architecture
- Style: Gothic
- Completed: 1028

Sant'Elena, also sometimes called Santa Lena, is a Gothic-style, Roman Catholic church at the extreme east end of the sestiere of Castello in the City of Venice, Italy.

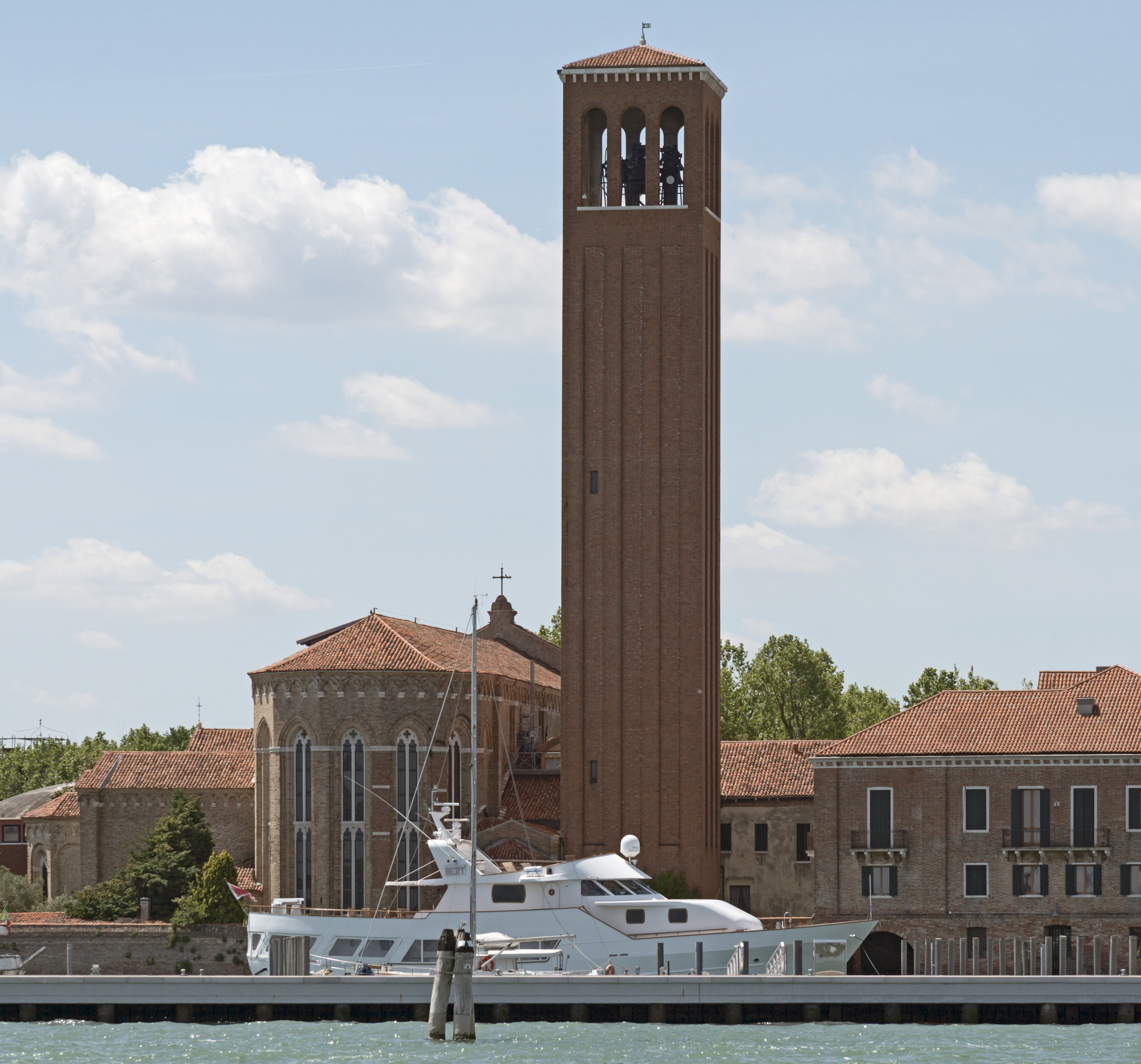
Church and belltower from Lagoon

== History ==
This site was once the island of Sant'Elena, which was not then accessible by foot from the city; it now represents the east end of Venice. The first chapel at this location was built by Augustinian monks in 1028 and dedicated to Saint Helene from Auxerre. By 1175, they had built a convent and hospital. In 1211, the body of Saint Helena of Constantinople was putatively transported to Venice from Constantinople by the monk Aicardo from this monastery. They added a chapel for her relics to the church. In 1407, the convent had fallen to ruin, and the complex was affiliated with the Olivetani order. In 1810, the church was deconsecrated under Napoleonic rule.

The urn putatively containing St Helen's remains was supposedly hidden in the Basilica of San Pietro in Castello, and the Renaissance portal of the church was transferred to the church of Sant'Aponal.

Sant'Elena was reconsecrated in 1928 and granted to the Servite Order. The urn of St. Helena was returned, the bell tower was rebuilt, and the original portal replaced. The main altarpiece, depicting the Adoration of the Magi with Saint Helena, was relocated to the Pinacoteca di Brera in Milan during the Napoleonic era, and remains there today.

== Description ==
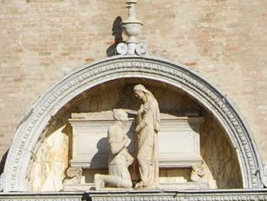
Capello monument in facade.

The mullioned windows and rose window in the brick façade are Gothic in style. Above the portal is the Renaissance style Monument to Vettore Capello (1467), where Capello, a Venetian admiral, is kneeling before the Saint; the sculptor was Niccolò di Giovanni of Florence.

The original bell-tower, built in 1558, had been razed in the early 19th century. The main altarpiece is a copy of that found in the Church of Sette Santi Fondatori in Florence. The interior is mostly bare; most of the paintings are now in the Gallerie dell'Accademia.

Of the adjacent convent, only part of the cloister and the central well head remain. The buildings now house a foundation dedicated to world peace.

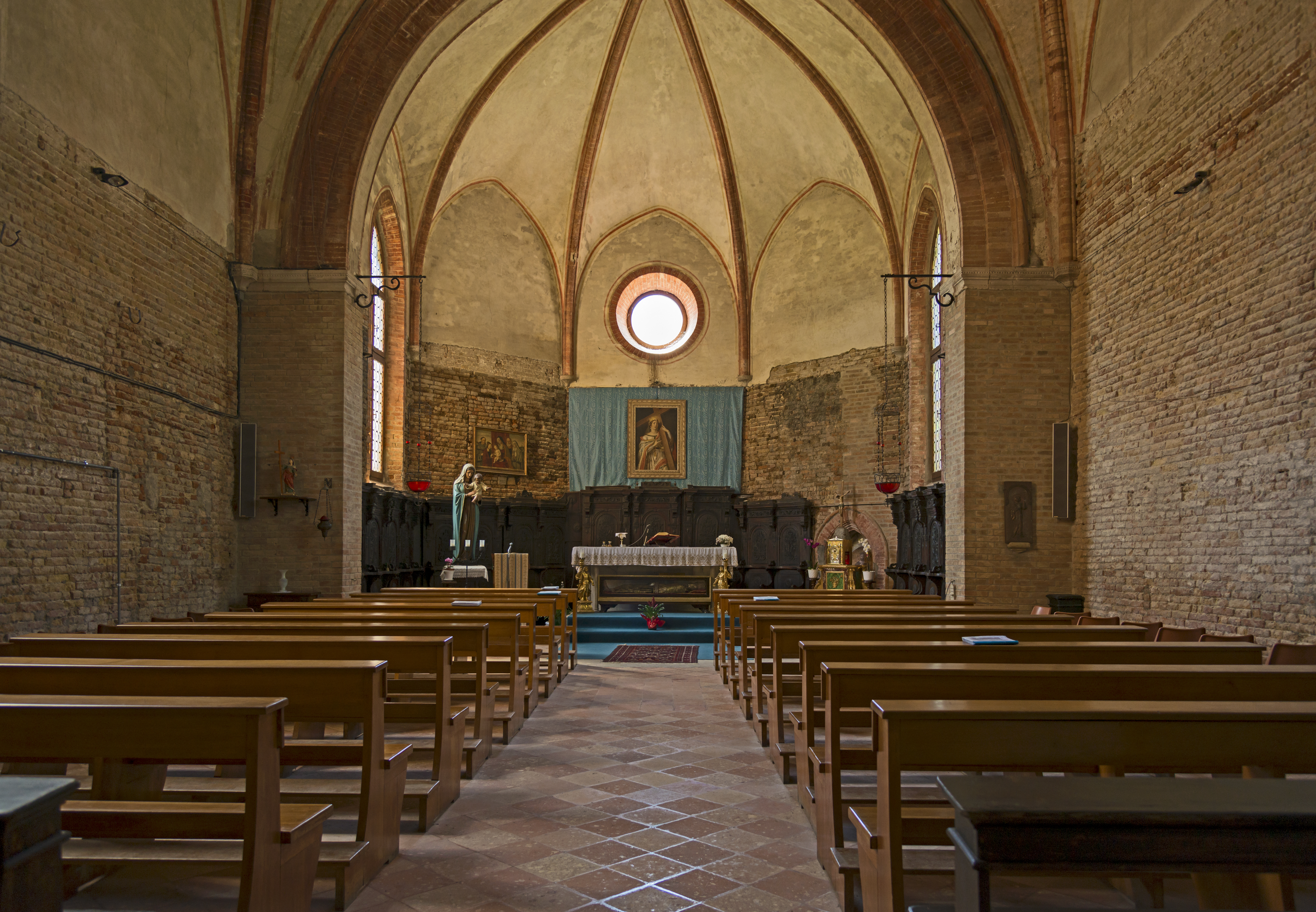
Chapel of St. Helena, mother of Constantine the Great

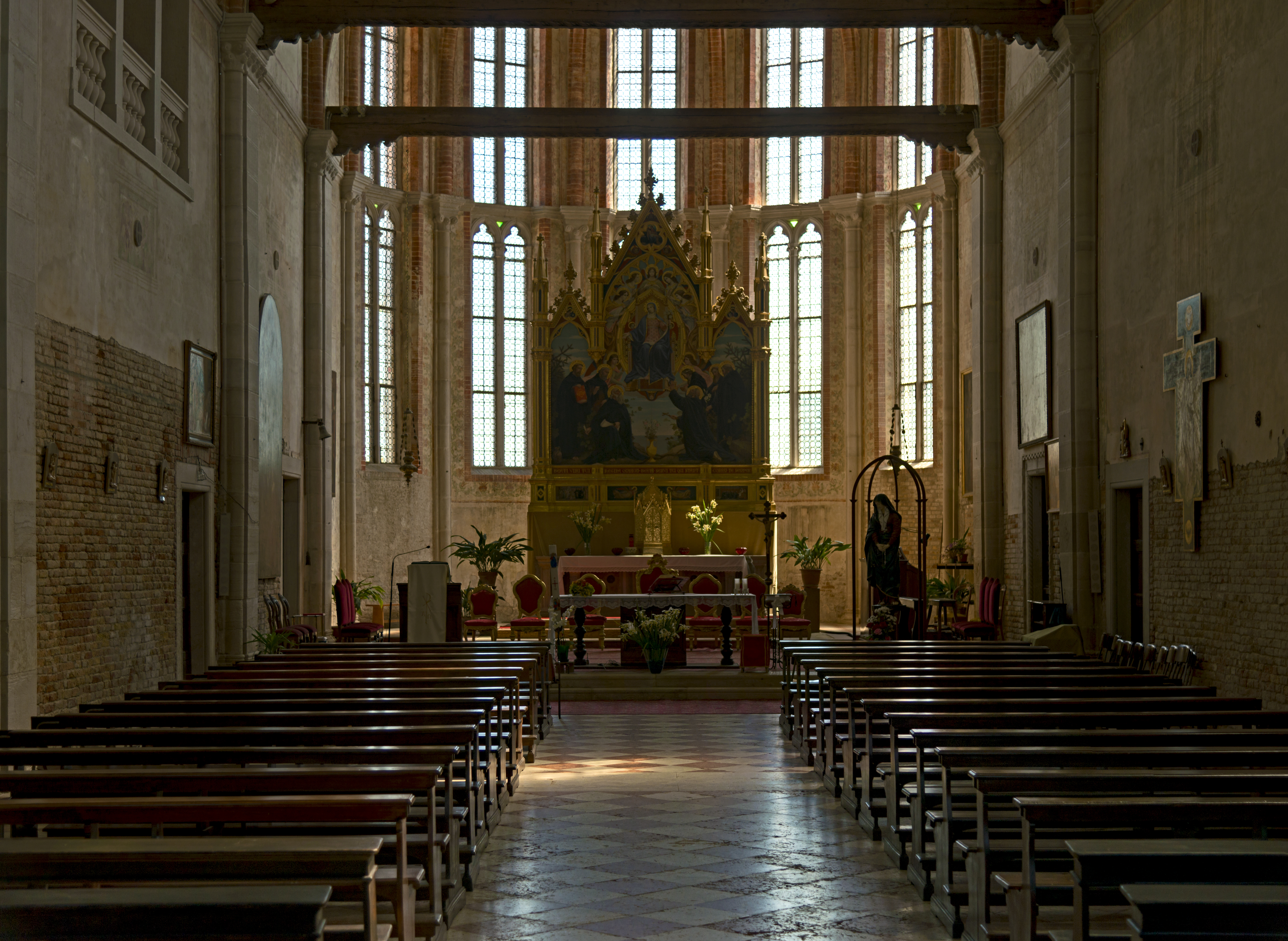
Inside the nave and choir

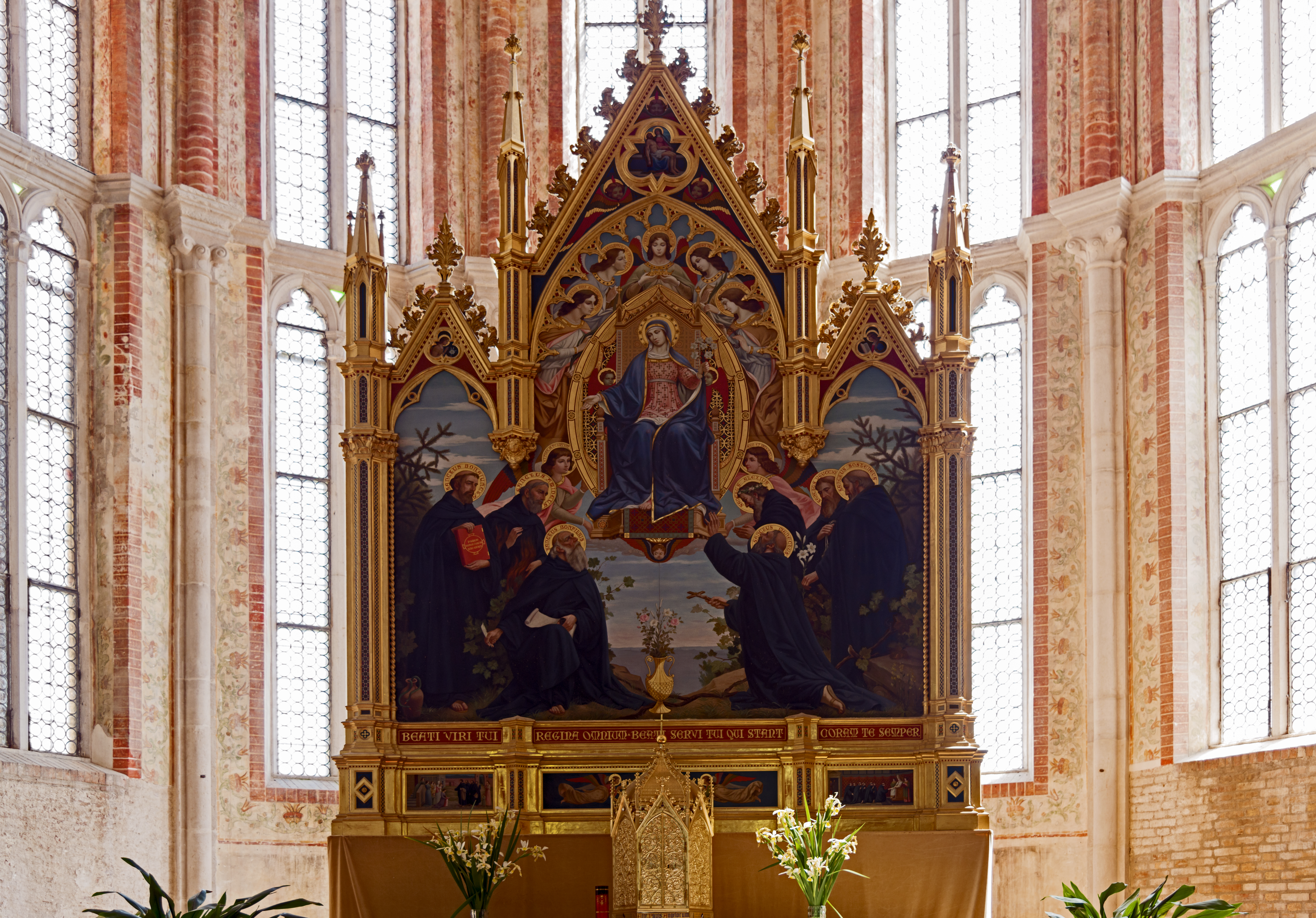
Altarpiece

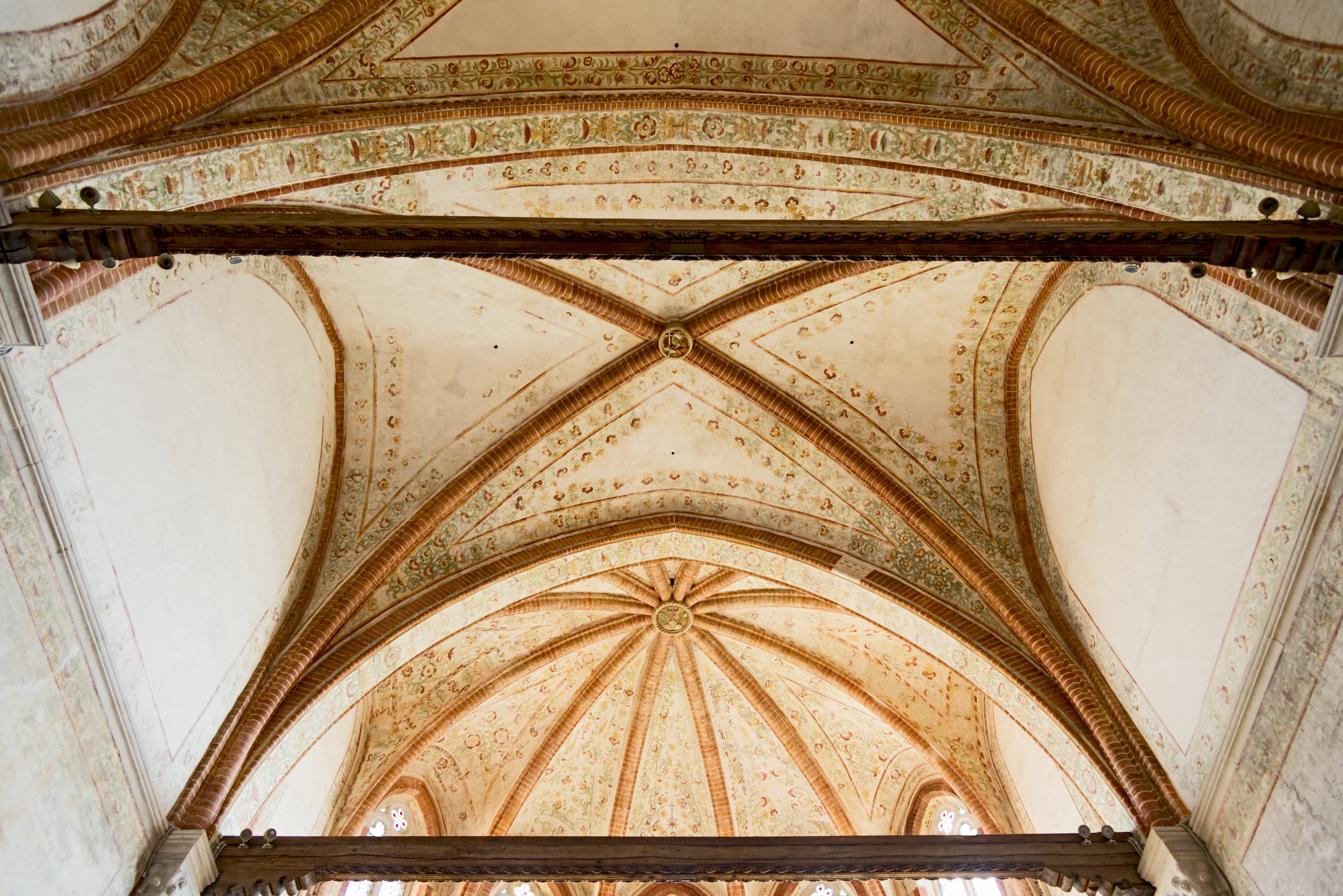
Ceilings of the nave and choir.

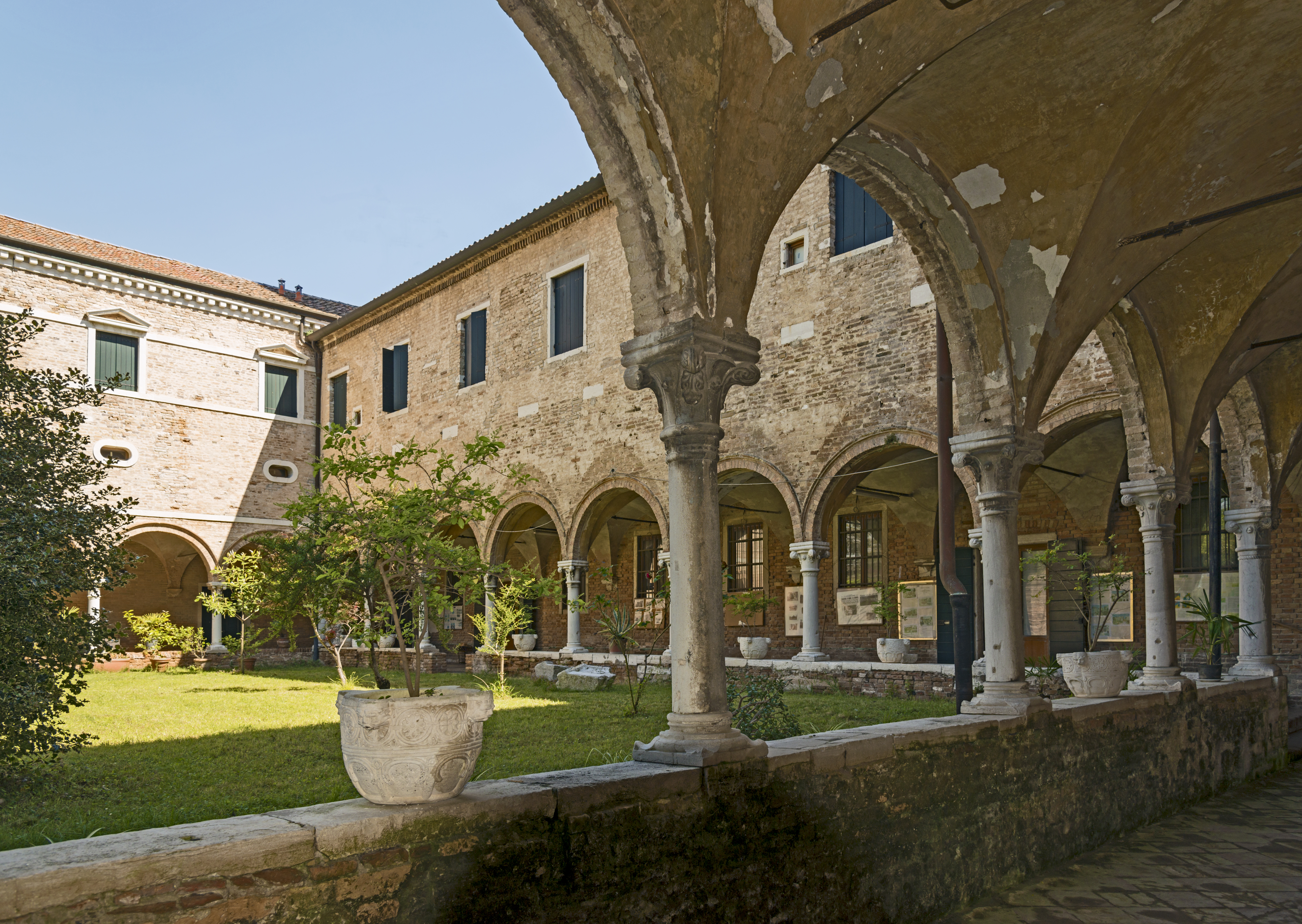
Cloister
