= Adoration of the Magi with Saint Helena =

Oil painting by Palma Vecchio

- Adorazione dei Magi con sant'Elena (Italian)
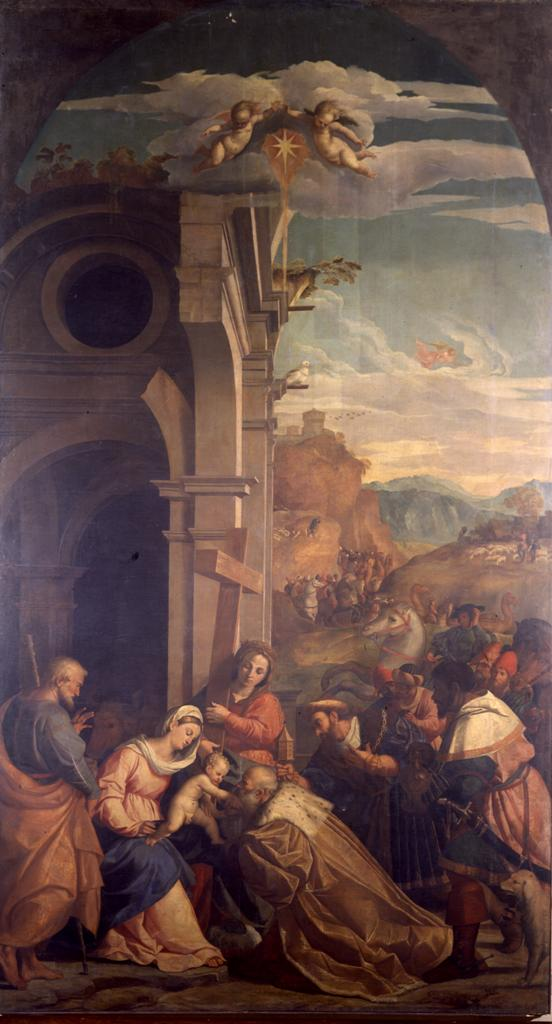
- Artist: Palma Vecchio
- Year: c. 1525–1526
- Medium: Oil on canvas
- Dimensions: 470 cm × 260 cm (190 in × 100 in)
- Location: Pinacoteca di Brera, Milan

The Adoration of the Magi with Saint Helena is an oil painting on canvas of c. 1525–1526 by Palma Vecchio in the Pinacoteca di Brera, Milan.

== Provenance ==
The work was commissioned for the Venetian church of Sant'Elena by Lady Orsa, the widow of Simone Malipiero.

The canvas depicts the Gospel story of the adoration of the Christ Child by the Magi, with Saint Helena, who can be identified by her attribute the True Cross, anachronistically shown as being present at the scene. The inclusion of the saint to whom the church was dedicated indicates that the work's original location was at the high altar.

The positioning of Helena's cross above the figures of the Virgin and Child is a clear prefiguration of Christ's fate. According to some critics the saint, prominently placed in the centre of the group of figures, is a representation of Lady Orsa who had commissioned the work.

With the Napoleonic suppressions the canvas, like many other works, was removed from its original location and assigned to the Pinacoteca di Brera in Milan.

According to some critics, the canvas is not entirely the work of Palma Vecchio but was completed by his pupils; Giovanni Morelli wrote that Palma "had to leave the execution entirely to one of his assistants".

== Description and style ==
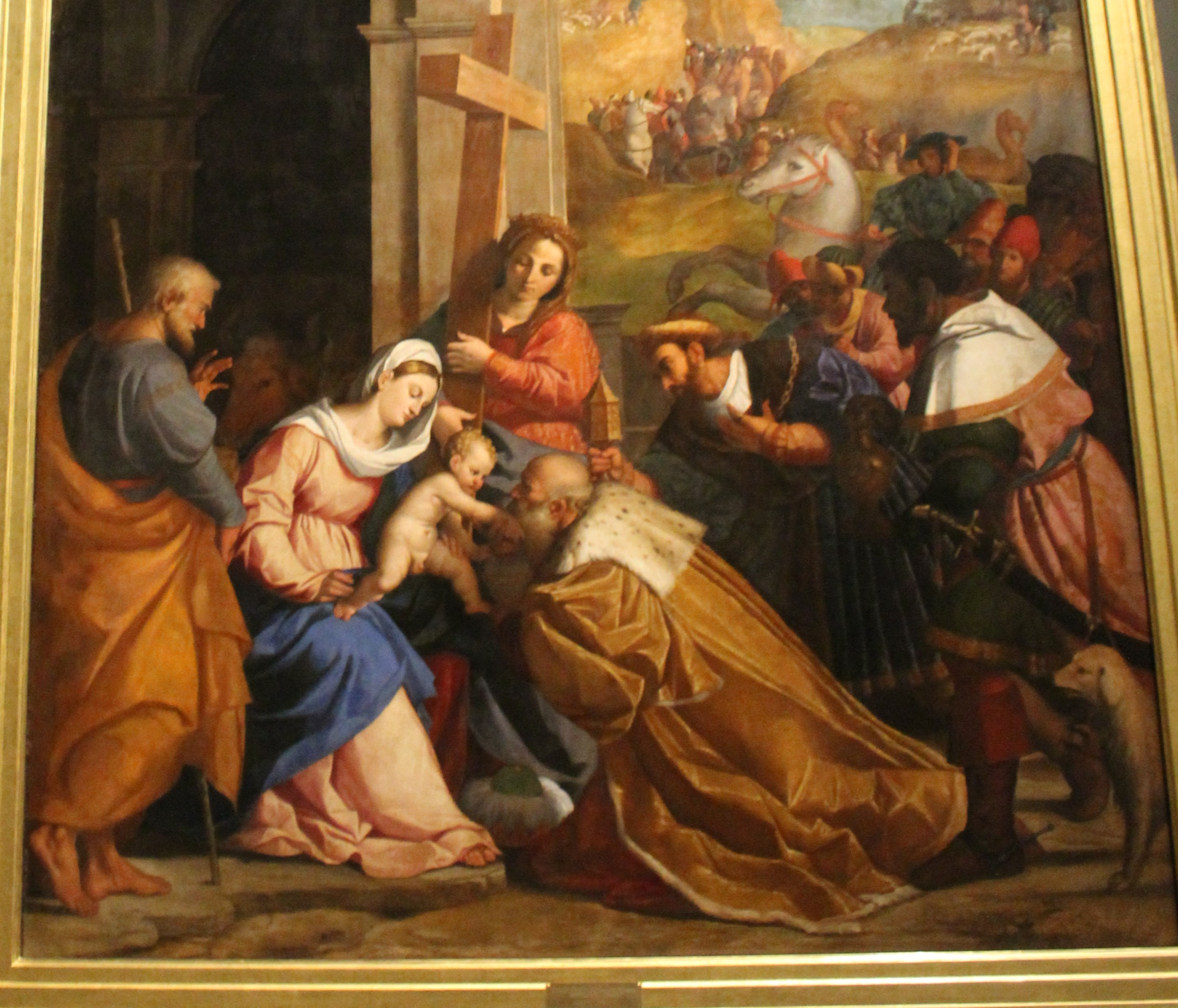
Detail of the painting

The canvas depicts the classic characters of the Adoration of the Magi, with Saint Joseph placed on the left of the canvas next to the Virgin and Child, and on the right the three Magi, one of them black and another an older man, accompanied by several soldiers and courtiers, who make up a procession winding through what appears to be a valley. In the distance a shepherd grazes his flock of sheep, while on the mountain on the opposite side is a castle, with blue mountains in the distance. A dilapidated classical building occupies the left-hand side of the composition.

The uneven quality of the work suggests that it was completed by assistants, perhaps by Giovanni Cariani.

== Bibliography ==
- Mariacher, Giovanni (1975). Palma Vecchio in "The Painters of Bergamo of the Sixteenth Century". Bergamo: Poligrafiche Bolis.
