= Palazzo Cavalli =

Palace in San Marco district, Venice, Italy

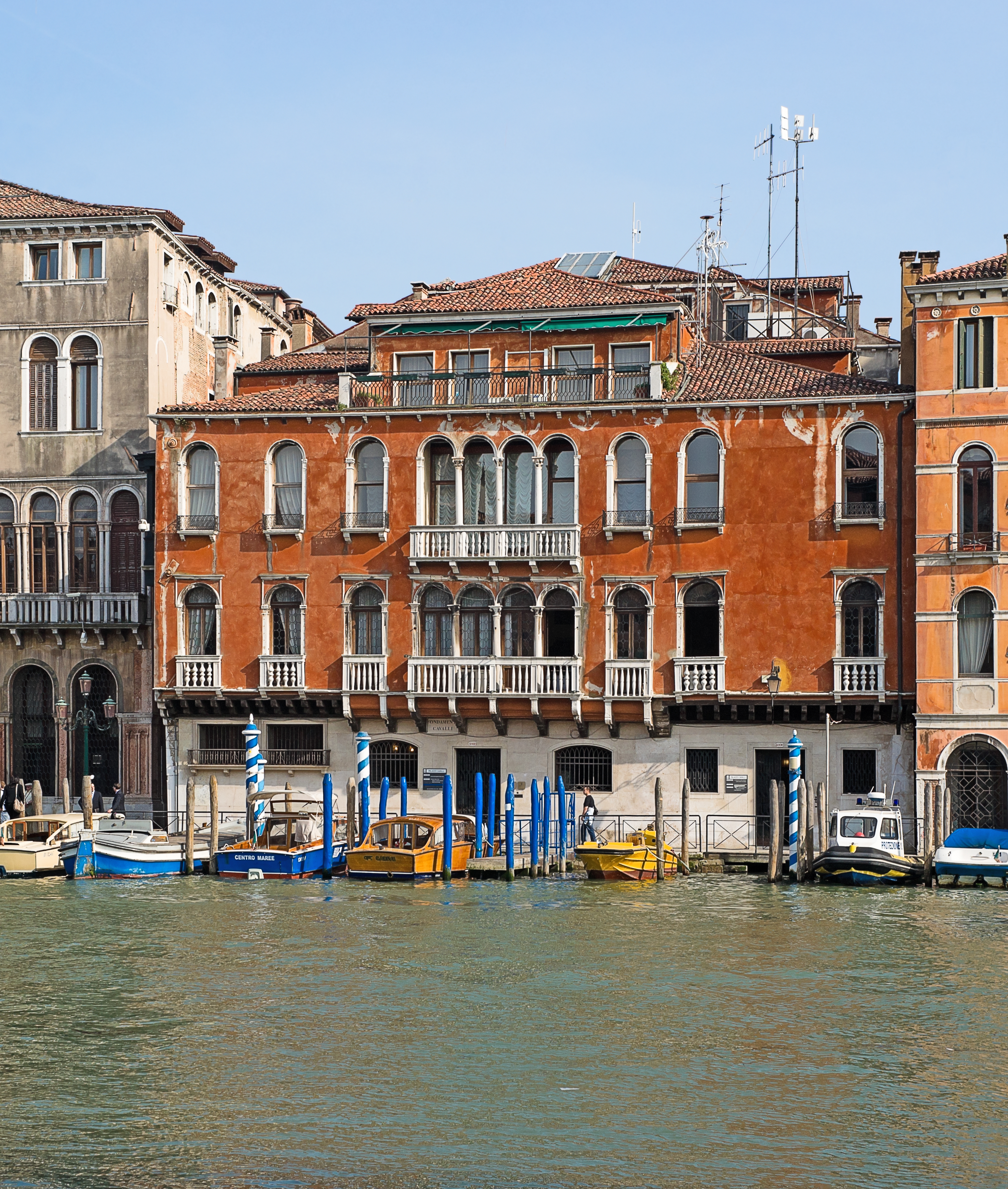
- Palazzo Cavalli
- Interactive map of the Palazzo Cavalli area

General information
- Type: Office
- Architectural style: Venetian Renaissance
- Location: San Marco district, Venice, Italy
- Coordinates: 45°26′11.57″N 12°20′00.69″E
- Construction started: 16th century

Technical details
- Floor count: 4 levels

Palazzo Cavalli or Palazzo Corner Martinengo is a palace in Venice, located in the San Marco district and overlooking the Grand Canal. It locates not far from the Ponte di Rialto, between Palazzo Corner Valmarana and Ca' Farsetti, in front of Palazzo Barzizza.

== History ==
Built in the 16th century and remodeled in the following centuries, Palazzo Cavalli is known for having hosted the writer James Fenimore Cooper in the 19th century.

In the 16th century, Bartolomeo d'Alviano lived there, a mercenary leader of the Venetian Republic, who defended of the city against the Holy Roman Emperor Maximilian. In 1521, the palace passed to the prominent Contarini family. Around 1830, the Mocenigo family owned the palace. Later, the palazzo was owned by the Ravenna family of Venice from the early 1900s until 1957, later it was acquired and completely restored by Dr. Ennio Forti, who resided there for thirty years before selling it in 1989 to the Municipality of Venice. The palace is the current headquarters of the Tide Forecast and Reporting Center of the municipality of Venice and the venue for weddings.

== Architecture ==
The facade is of three floors high. The ground floor has two portals on a small foundation overlooking the canal. Either of two noble floors features a quadrifora with balustrade, flanked by three single-light windows on each side with parapets. A small penthouse with terrace was added in more recent period and is located on the central part of the top of the building, above the thin notched cornice that runs through the attic.

== See also ==
- Palazzo Cavalli-Franchetti
