= Ca' Farsetti =

Palace in Venice, Italy

Coordinates: 45.4364°N 12.3339°E

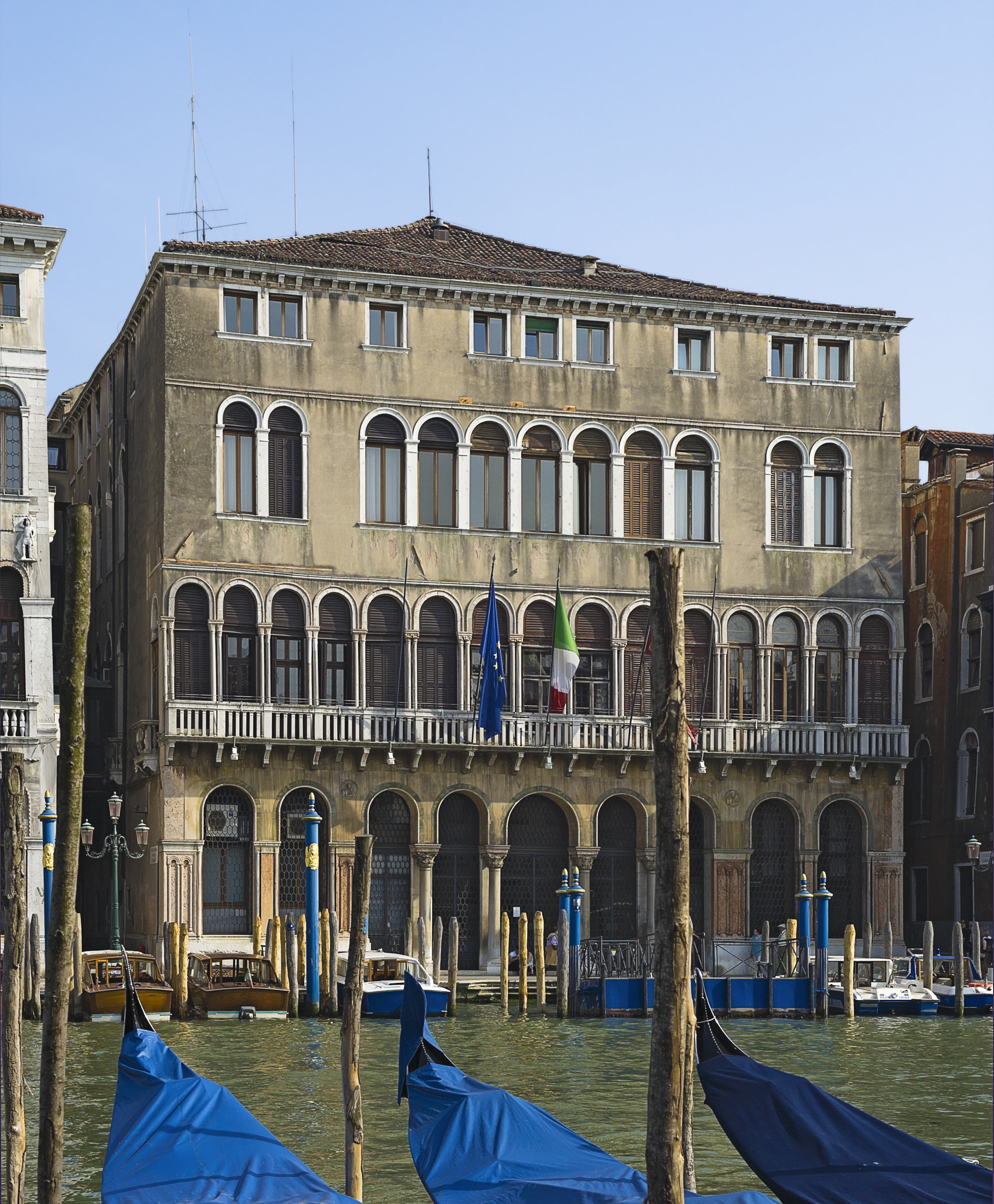
View of Ca' Farsetti from the Grand Canal in Venice.

Ca' Farsetti is a palace in Venice, Italy. It is located in the sestiere (district) of San Marco, and faces the Grand Canal, not far from the Ponte di Rialto. The neighboring building is Palazzo Cavalli.

== History ==
The palace was built in the 13th century by the heirs of doge Enrico Dandolo. The palace however suffered near destruction in a fire in 1524.: Federigo Contarini, who bought it in 1440, added two further floors. It was acquired around 1670 by the Farsetti family, who established here an academy in the 18th century. In the early 19th century it was converted into a hotel, and, in 1926, it became a property of the municipality of Venice.

== Architecture ==
The lower floors are in Venetian-Byzantine style with a portico with Corinthian columns, similar to that of the neighbouring Ca' Loredan. The piano nobile has fifteen arcades connected by a balustrade. The second floor and the mezzanine are in Renaissance style.

== Events ==
On 27 September 2014, the American film star George Clooney and the British human rights lawyer Amal Alamuddin were officially married at Ca' Farsetti by Clooney's friend Walter Veltroni, the former mayor of Rome.
