= Palazzo Cavalli-Franchetti =

Palace in Venice, Italy

Coordinates: 45°25′54.1″N 12°19′46.6″E

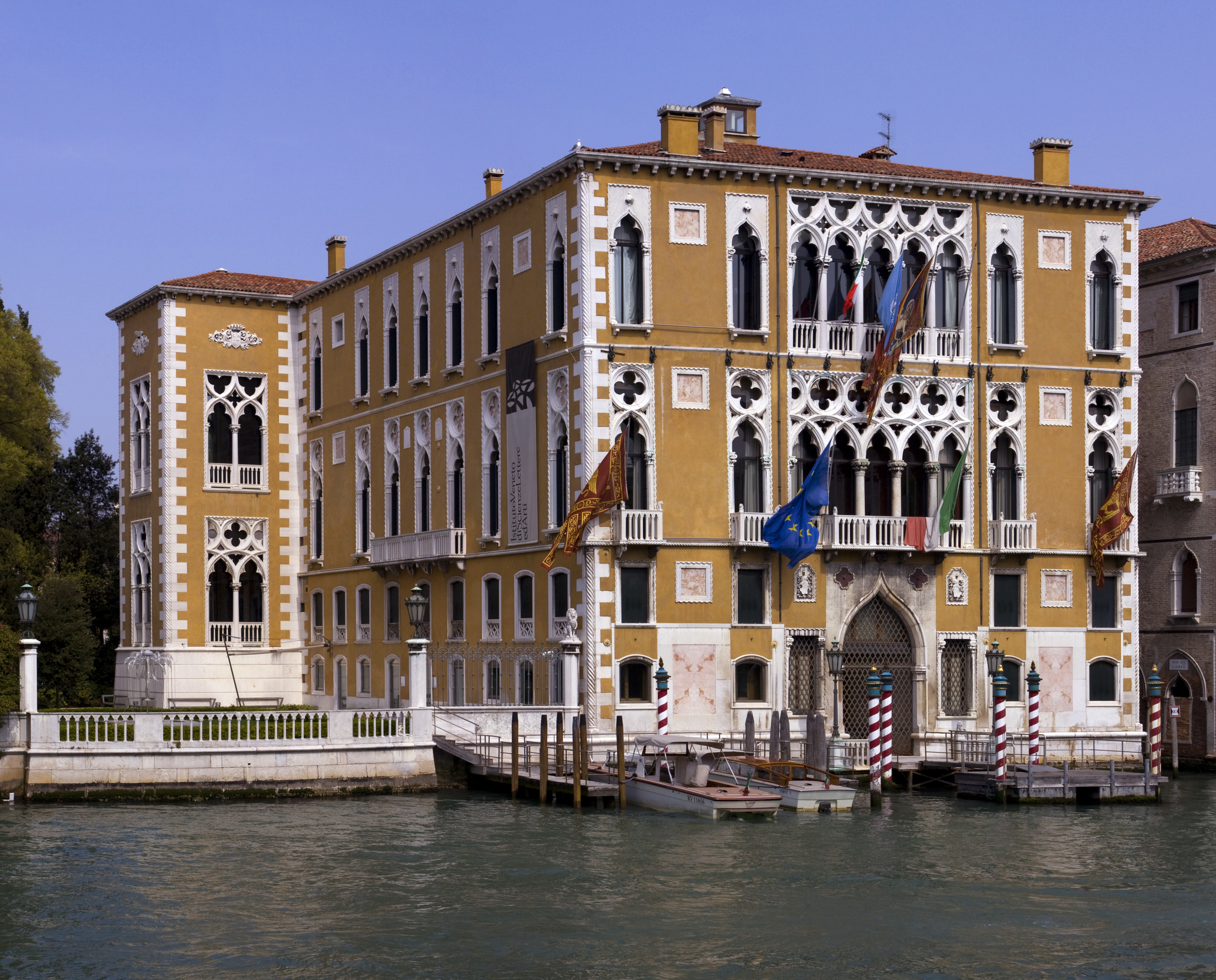
Palazzo Cavalli-Franchetti

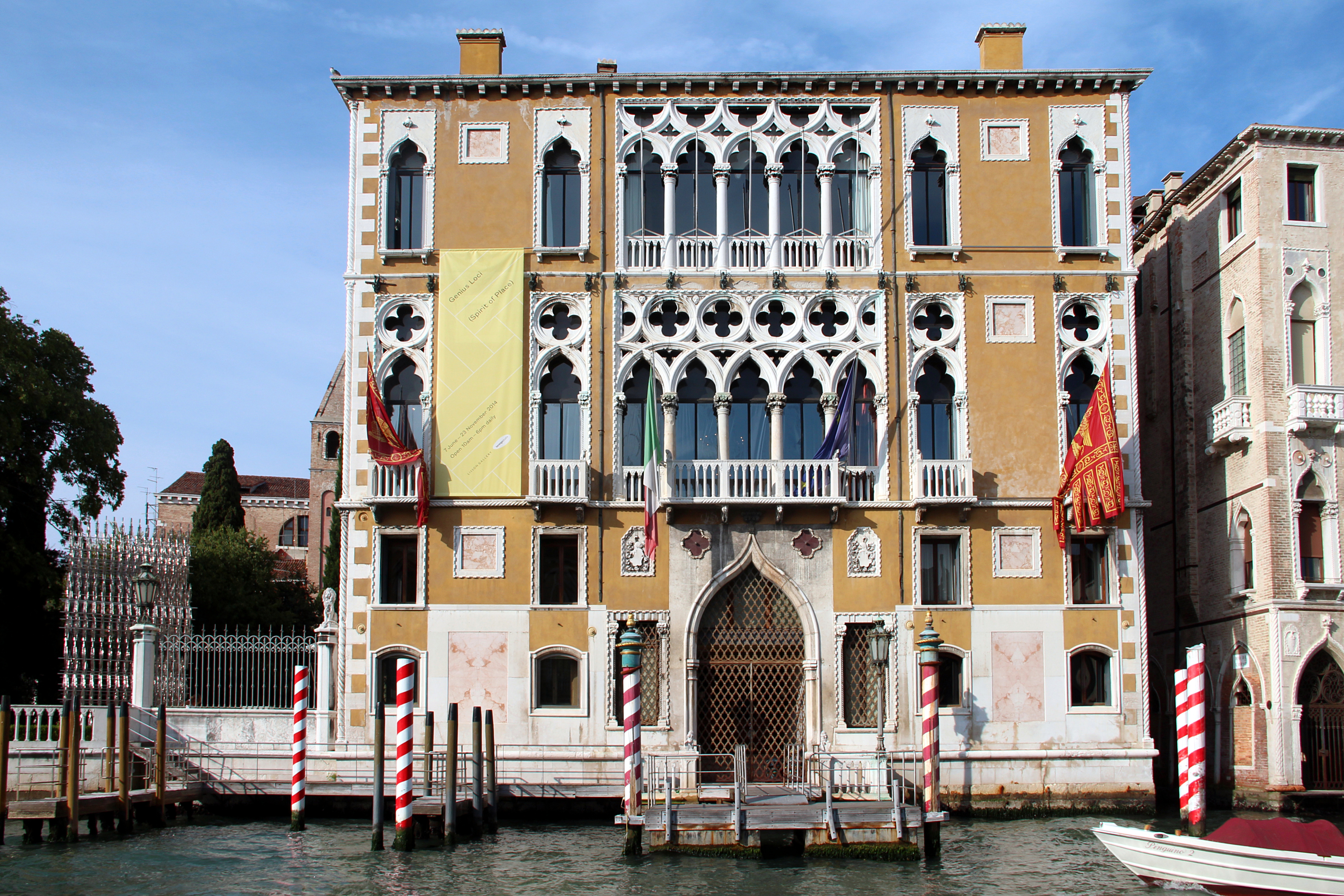
South facade of the Cavalli-Franchetti palace

Palazzo Cavalli-Franchetti is a palace in Venice, Italy, not far from the Ponte dell'Accademia and next to the Palazzo Barbaro on the Grand Canal of Venice. The palace was erected in 1565 by the patrician Marcello family, later passing to the Gussoni. In the 19th century it was internally modernised and externally enriched in revived Venetian Gothic style, with rich window framing, by a series of grand owners.

Since 1999 it has been the seat of the Istituto Veneto di Scienze, Lettere ed Arti and frequently houses cultural events.

== Later history ==
The first neo-Gothic improvements were made after 1840, when the young Archduke Frederick Ferdinand of Austria (1821–1847) reassembled the property, the Palazzo Cavalli-Gussoni, which had become divided among heirs, and embarked on a complex project intended to give a more prominent Habsburg presence along the Grand Canal, as Austria-Hungary had been awarded the territories of Venice after the Napoleonic Wars. At his premature death, unmarried, in 1847 the palazzo was bought by Henri, comte de Chambord, styled "Henri V" by Bourbon legitimists, who entrusted further restorations to Giambattista Meduna; his portrait on the balcony, with Santa Maria Della Salute in the background, is in the Ducal Palace of Modena.

In 1878, Baron Raimondo Franchetti (1829–1905), who had married Sarah Luisa de Rothschild (1834–1924), daughter of Anselm Salomon Rothschild of the Vienna Rothschilds, bought the palazzo and commissioned further works by architect Camillo Boito, who constructed the grand staircase. In September 1922, it was sold to the Istituto Federale di Credito per il Risorgimento delle Venezie by Franchetti's widow.

== See also ==
- Palazzo Cavalli
