= Guy of Enghien =

Guy of Enghien (French: Guy de Enghien; died 1376) was the lord of Argos and Nauplia from 1356 to 1377 as vassal of the Principality of Achaea and titular duke of Athens as Guy III. He was son of Walter III of Enghien and Isabella of Brienne.

He married Bonne of Foucherolles and had a daughter, Maria, who succeeded her father in Argos and Nauplia.

Regnal titles
Preceded by Walter II	Lord of Argos and Nauplia; 1356–1376	Succeeded by Maria
