= Lordship of Argos and Nauplia =

Southern Greek fiefdom (1212–1388)

Argos and Nauplia
- Lordship in fief of the Principality of Achaea (de facto autonomous)
- 1212–1388
- Arms of the House of Brienne, rulers of the lordship from 1309 to 1356
- Capital: Nauplia
- Area
  - Coordinates: 37°33′51″N 22°47′47″E
  - Type: Feudal lordship
- Historical era: Middle Ages
  - Established: 1212
  - Sold to Venice: 1388
Preceded by	Succeeded by
Leo Sgouros	Despotate of the Morea; Republic of Venice

During the late Middle Ages, the two cities of Argos and Nauplia formed a lordship within the Frankish-ruled Morea in southern Greece.

Following their conquest in 1211–1212, the cities were granted as a fief to Otto de la Roche, duke of Athens, by Geoffrey I of Villehardouin, prince of Achaea. The lordship remained in the possession of the de la Roche and the Brienne dukes of Athens even after the conquest of the Duchy of Athens by the Catalan Company in 1311, and the Brienne line continued to be recognized as dukes of Athens there. Walter VI of Brienne was largely an absentee lord, spending most of his life in his European domains, except for a failed attempt in 1331 to recover Athens from the Catalans. After his death in 1356 the lordship was inherited by Guy of Enghien. Guy took up residence in Greece, and in 1370–1371 Guy and his brothers launched another, also failed, invasion of the Catalan domains. When Guy died in 1376, the lordship then passed to his daughter Maria of Enghien and her Venetian husband Pietro Cornaro, who would also reside there until his death in 1388. The lordship became a de facto Venetian dependency during this period, and shortly after his death, Maria sold the two cities to Venice, where she retired. Before Venice could take possession, Argos was seized by the Despot Theodore I Palaiologos, while his ally, Nerio I Acciaioli seized Nauplia. The latter city was soon captured by Venice, but Argos remained in Byzantine hands until 1394, when it too was handed over to Venice.

== History ==
Map of the Peloponnese or Morea peninsula with its principal locations during the late Middle Ages

In the first years of the 13th century, already before the arrival of the Fourth Crusade in the Byzantine Empire, Argos and Nauplia became the centre of an independent domain under the Greek lord Leo Sgouros. Sgouros had exploited the feebleness of imperial authority, and like many other provincial magnates, proceeded to carve out his own principality. From his hometown Nauplia, he seized Argos and Corinth, and attacked Athens, although he failed to take the Acropolis of Athens. By early 1205, Sgouros had advanced into Boeotia and Thessaly, but was forced to abandon his conquests in the face of the Crusaders under Boniface of Montferrat, who advanced south from Thessalonica. Boniface overran Thessaly, Boeotia and Attica, where he installed his followers as barons, and his men invaded the Morea. Sgouros and his men held out in the citadels of Argos, Nauplia and Corinth, however, even after both Boniface and Sgouros died, in 1207 and 1208 respectively. The three fortresses were kept under siege by the Crusaders until the fall of Acrocorinth in 1210, followed by Nauplia and finally by Argos in 1212. The Lord of Athens, Otto de la Roche (r. 1204–1225/34), played a major role in their capture, and as a reward the Prince of Achaea Geoffrey I of Villehardouin (r. 1209 – c. 1229) gave him Argos and Nauplia as a fief, along with an income of 400 hyperpyra from Corinth. The area of Damala (Troezen) in the Argolid was also given to the de la Roche, but soon passed to a cadet branch of the family, which assumed the Barony of Veligosti. Despite the establishment of a Frankish lordship in the southern Argolid, however, the Franks were never numerous in the district. Much as happened elsewhere in the Morea, the local Greek magnates simply submitted to their new Frankish lords, but kept their possessions and Orthodox faith, as well as a typically Byzantine culture, as evidenced by the continued construction of Byzantine-style churches during the period.

=== Under the de la Roche family ===
After the death of Otto I, some time between 1225 and 1234, Argos and Nauplia were inherited by his son Otto II de la Roche, while Athens went to Guy I de la Roche (r. 1225/34–1263). In April 1251, Otto II sold his Greek possessions to his brother Guy I in exchange of 15,000 gold hyperpyra and the latter's lands and claims in France.

Following the fall of Boniface's Kingdom of Thessalonica to the Greek Despotate of Epirus in 1224, the Principality of Achaea emerged as the most powerful and pre-eminent among the Latin states of southern Greece. Inevitably, the other Latin lordships began to be drawn into the orbit of Achaea, which during the early reign of William II of Villehardouin (r. 1247–1278) reached the height of its power and prosperity. Guy I de la Roche was one of William's feudatories, both for Argos and Nauplia, as well as for his possession of one half of Thebes As a result, he participated in the siege and conquest of the last Greek stronghold in the Morea, the fortress city of Monemvasia (1246–1248), alongside William. At about the same time, William received from the Latin Emperor the suzerainty over the Duchy of Naxos, Negroponte (Euboea), and possibly over the Marquisate of Bodonitsa as well, while the County of Cephalonia also recognized his overlordship. William's hegemonic ambitions worried many of the other Latin rulers and barons, however, resulting in the War of the Euboeote Succession (1256–1258). Guy de la Roche fought against William in the conflict, but it ended in a complete victory for William and Guy's submission to the Prince of Achaea.

Following the capture of William II by the Byzantines in the Battle of Pelagonia (1259), in 1261 the Byzantine emperor Michael VIII Palaiologos (r. 1259–1282) received a number of fortresses in the southeastern Morea (Monemvasia, Mystras and Grand Magne, possibly also Geraki) as a ransom for the Prince's release. According to George Pachymeres, Argos and Nauplia were also demanded by Palaiologos, but in the event they remained in Latin hands. In the 1270s, with the rise of the Latin renegade Licario, who became a Byzantine admiral, the Argolid suffered repeated raids at the hands of Licario's corsairs.

=== Under the Brienne family ===
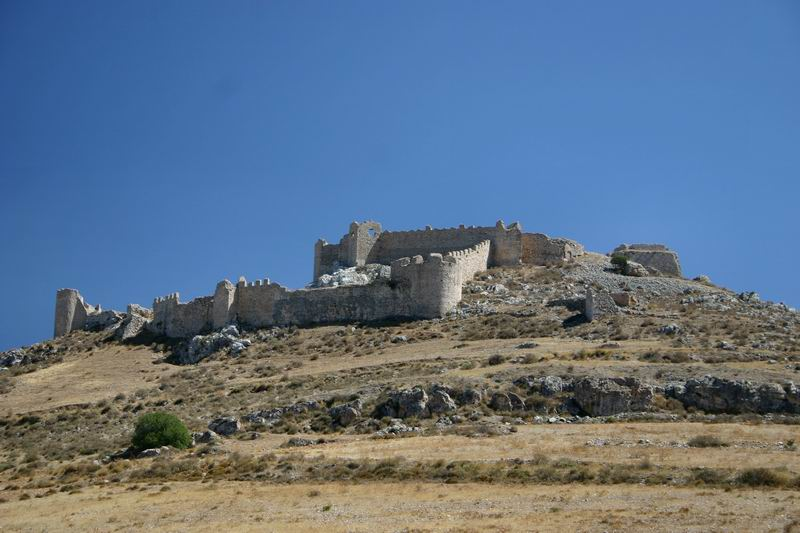
Larisa, the citadel of Argos, extensively refortified in the 13th–14th centuries

In 1309, Walter I of Brienne succeeded to the Duchy of Athens, but he and many of the most important lords of Frankish Greece fell in the Battle of Halmyros in March 1311 against the Catalan Company. In its aftermath, the Catalans took over the Duchy of Athens and, with the military capacity of the remaining Latin states of Greece crippled, threatened to invade the Morea and take over Argos and Nauplia as well. After briefly holding Athens against the Catalans, Walter's widow, Joanna of Châtillon, went to France to solicit aid from her father, the Constable of France Gaucher V de Châtillon, whom she appointed bailli in her name on 22 November 1312.

Over the next few years, with support from the Angevin Kingdom of Naples and the Papacy, Joanna dispatched men and provisions to the Argolid, which was administered in her name by the local Frankish brothers Walter and Francis of Foucherolles. The steadfast loyalty of the Foucherolles to the Briennist claimants was instrumental in keeping the lordship under their control over the next decade, when the Argolid was ravaged by Catalan raids. The lordship's maintenance necessitated continuous expense, however, which forced Joanna to undertake large debts. When Joanna's son Walter II of Brienne came of age in January 1321, he initially refused to take over his mother's debts. King Philip V of France adjudicated between them and decided that Walter had to pay off the sum of 7,000 livres tournois and his mother the rest.

The Briennist claims were upheld by Pope Clement V and Pope John XXII, who took a firm stance against the Catalan Company: the Catalans were excommunicated, their attacks on fellow Christians excoriated, and attacks on them by the other Latin powers of Greece encouraged. Clement sought the intercession of King James II of Aragon to get the Catalans to abandon Athens, but the King's appeal to that effect was ignored. Clement further ordered the Knights Hospitaller to provide three or four galleys and men to defend the Brienne lands, and in 1314 commanded all Templar properties in the Duchy of Athens to be placed under the control of Gaucher V de Châtillon and to be used against the Catalans. The Briennist cause was undermined, however, by the persistent refusal of the Republic of Venice to support anti-Catalan ventures. Although the Venetians were often at odds with the Catalans over their claims to various fiefs in Euboea, in 1319 an accord was reached that established generally peaceful relations between the two over the next few decades.

After 1321, Walter II repeatedly announced his intention to campaign in Greece and recover the Duchy of Athens, but financial constraints and his obligations to the King of Naples kept him occupied in Italy. In 1328, he even briefly concluded a truce with the Catalans. Thus it was not until 1330 that a serious effort got under way. In June 1330, Pope John XXII issued a crusading bull for Walter, and ordered prelates in Italy and Greece to preach for a crusade against the Catalans; shortly after, King Robert of Naples also gave the crusade his support, and allowed his feudatories to join it. The Venetians, on the other hand, renewed their treaty with the Catalans in April 1331. Sailing from Brindisi in August, Walter attacked first the Latin County palatine of Cephalonia and Zakynthos, and the Greek Despotate of Epirus, forcing them to recognize the overlordship of King Robert. From there he proceeded to invade the Duchy of Athens through northern Boeotia, but his campaign was a failure as the Catalans avoided battle and withdrew behind the walls of Thebes and Athens. Walter had neither the troops to overwhelm the Catalans nor the money to sustain a prolonged war of sieges and attrition, and found no support among the native Greek population. By summer 1332, it was clear that the expedition had failed, and Walter returned to Brindisi. He had captured the island of Leucas and Vonitsa for himself and briefly restored Angevin suzerainty over western Greece, but the main objective had eluded him, and he had ended up with even more crippling debts. The effect of his expedition on Argos and Nauplia is unclear; he may not even have visited the territory during his stay in Greece.

Walter did not abandon his plans for regaining his inheritance in Greece, and retained papal support, which materialized in repeated excommunications of the Catalans. With the Venetians firmly opposed to rendering any help, however, Walter's plans could not be fulfilled. After further ventures and adventures in Italy and France, Walter was killed at the Battle of Poitiers in 1356. During this time, the Argolid suffered a raid by the Aydinid Turks under Umur Bey in 1332, which coincided with a prolonged famine that required food to be imported from Italy. At the same time, Argos and Nauplia also came within reach of the expanding Byzantine province in the Morea, which by c. 1320 had expanded from the southeast to include most of Arcadia and Cynuria. The increased threat to the lordship prompted Walter II to construct two new castles, which first appear in his will of 1347: at Kiveri (Chamires in French) across the Argolic Gulf from Nauplia and Thermisi (Trémis) further east along the coast, across Hydra Island. Despite the depredations from raids, the Brienne fief was relatively prosperous: the area was fertile and supported agriculture, pastures for livestock, and vineyards, while the Argolic Gulf provided fisheries and salt flats near Thermisi. According to documents from later in the 14th century, carobs, raisins, resin and acorn dyes, as well as cotton and linen cloth, were exported.

=== Under the Enghien family ===
Walter II died without direct heirs, as his only son had died as a child during his 1331 campaign. He was succeeded in his titles and claims by his sister Isabella and her husband, Walter of Enghien, but these were immediately devolved on their numerous children. While the couple's second (and eldest surviving) son, Sohier of Enghien, received the County of Brienne and the rights to Athens, it was a younger son, Engelbert, who received Argos and Nauplia, as well as Walter's lands in Cyprus. Unwilling to undertake the considerable burden of defending the Greek fiefs, Engelbert exchanged them with his brother Guy, who had originally received the fief of Ramerupt in France. Guy thus became the new "Lord of Argos, Nauplia and Kiveri".

Guy replaced Nicholas of Foucherolles, who had served as bailli during the last decade of Walter's reign, with two members of a branch of the Medici family who had settled in Greece: Piere Tantenes ("of Athens"), also known as "Yatro" (Greek for "physician", a hellenization of "Medici") in 1357–1360 and Arardo or Averardo de Medici in 1360–1363/4. Their rule proved unpopular, however, and in 1360 the local populace rebelled—according to historian Thanos Kondylis, perhaps with the encouragement of the Foucherolles—when Averardo de Medici increased taxation on figs and raisins, and blockaded Guy's soldiers in their castles. The situation was resolved when Guy in person came and settled in the lordship—he is attested at Nauplia in December 1364, where he issued an act in favour of Jacomo, Lord of Tzoya and a son-in-law of Nicholas of Foucherolles. Guy strengthened his ties to the lordship by marrying into the local aristocracy. The identity of his wife is unclear: the early 15th-century Chronographia regum francorum records that she was the daughter of the Baron of Arcadia, probably Erard III le Maure, while the 17th-century Flemish historian Vredius records that she was a Greek named Bonne or Maria. The 19th-century historian of Frankish Greece, Karl Hopf, hypothesized that Bonne was a daughter of Nicholas of Foucherolles, but without any evidence; nevertheless, his version is commonly accepted in modern literature.

Guy's reign was troubled by the threat of the Ottoman Turks, against whom, according to the Chronographia regum francorum, he proved a courageous leader. To strengthen the security of his domains, on 22 July 1362, Guy became a Venetian citizen, a development that heralded active Venetian involvement in the affairs of the area. Two years later, soon after his arrival in the Morea, he was involved in the civil war over possession of the Principality of Achaea between Philip II of Taranto and Maria of Bourbon, widow of Philip's older brother Robert, who died in September 1364 without a direct heir. Guy, along with the Despot of the Morea Manuel Kantakouzenos (r. 1349–1380), supported Maria and her son Hugh of Lusignan until 1370, when the latter sold their claims to Philip.

Now the undisputed Prince of Achaea, Philip sent to the Morea as his bailli Guy's brother Louis, Count of Conversano. By this time, the Catalans of Athens had entered a period of decline and civil war, which only somewhat subsided with the appointment of Matthew of Peralta as vicar-general in 1370. The Enghiens saw a perfect opportunity to reclaim their ancestral inheritance: on 28 March 1370 a third brother, John of Enghien, Count of Lecce, received permission from Queen Joanna I of Naples to gather 1,000 foot and 500 horse for service in Greece, and began arranging for ships to ferry them along the southeastern coasts of Italy. Guy also arranged a truce with the Despot of the Morea so as to concentrate his forces against the Catalans. As Venetian citizens, the Enghiens also approached Venice for aid, which was politely but firmly declined, first in April 1370, and again in February 1371. Undeterred, the Enghiens launched an invasion of Attica in spring 1371, but the campaign failed as the Acropolis resisted and Louis fell ill. The Enghiens retreated, and Guy concluded a truce with the Catalans in August; a marriage between his daughter and heir Maria and Joan de Llúria (probably the son of the former Catalan vicar-general Roger de Llúria) was initially stipulated in the agreement, but never actually took place. This was to be the last effort by the claimants, for troubles in Italy occupied Guy's brothers, and the looming Ottoman threat forced the Papacy to shift to a policy of supporting the Catalans. Any prospects to regain the Athenian duchy were further impeded by the capture of Megara by the ambitious Nerio I Acciaioli in 1374/75, which barred the land route into Attica to the Enghiens. Guy of Engien died shortly after October 1376. As his daughter Maria was underage and unmarried, the Lordship was governed by his brother Louis as her guardian. Louis arranged Maria's marriage to the Venetian Pietro Cornaro in May 1377. Louis seems to have launched some raids against the Catalans in 1377, but this was overshadowed by the fall of the Duchy of Athens to the Navarrese Company in 1379.

=== Takeover by Venice ===
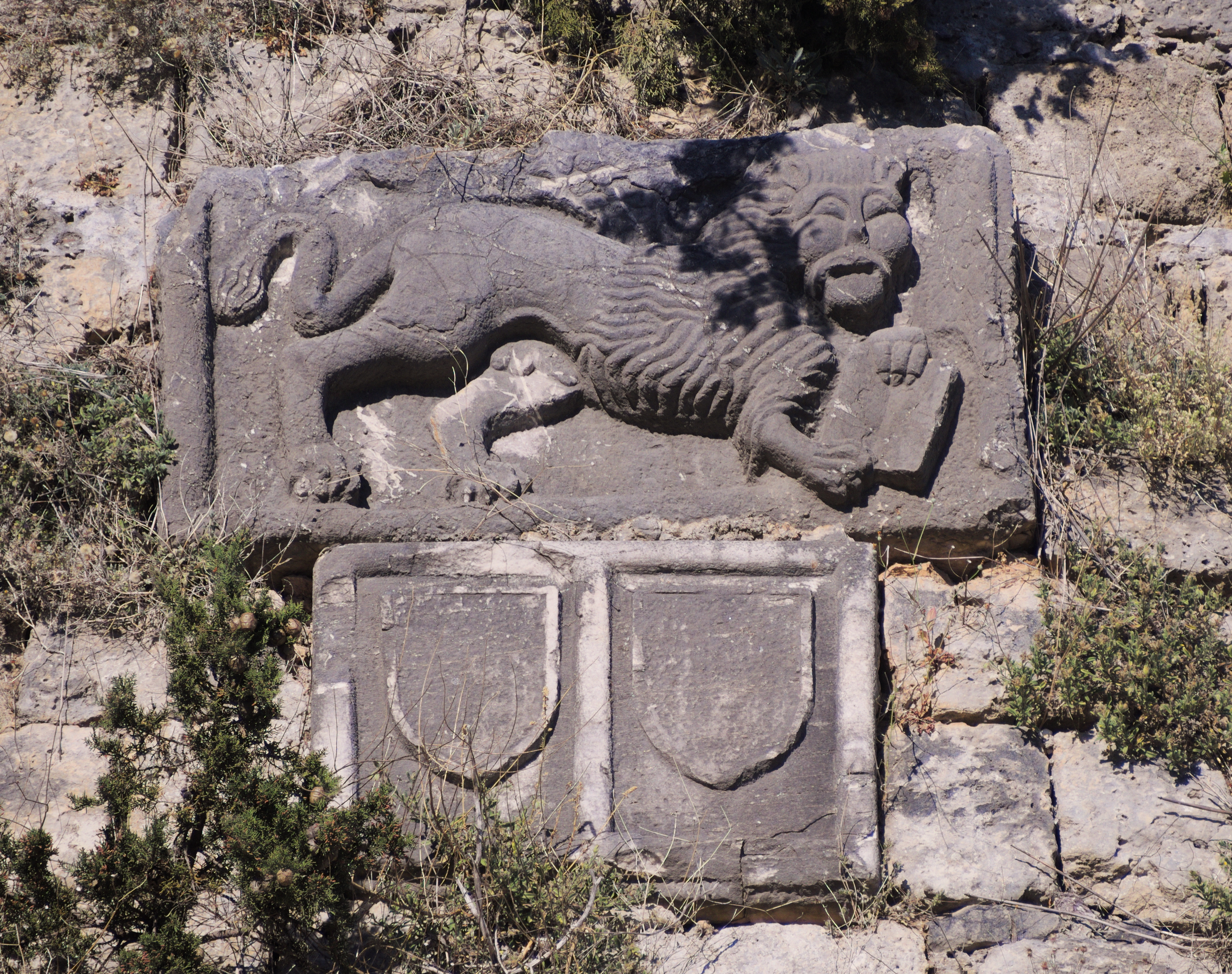
Relief of the Venetian Lion of Saint Mark on the Akronauplia fortress

The Cornaro family had been established in Latin Greece for some time, acting both as the Republic of Venice's officials and on their own account, and Pietro's father Federico was accounted the richest man in Venice in 1379. The marriage of Maria of Enghien and Pietro Cornaro coincided with an increasing Venetian interest in the region, as the Republic faced new challenges and opportunities in the Aegean with the rise of the Ottomans. Possession of Nauplia would complete Venice's control of the shores of the Morea, which in turn controlled the routes from the Adriatic to the eastern Mediterranean; while Nauplia itself was valuable as an intermediate stop for the Black Sea commercial routes as well. Maria of Enghien and Pietro Cornaro were both still young when they became lords of Argos and Nauplia. In the first years of their reign, they resided in Venice, and Pietro's father Federico acted on their behalf, securing permissions from the Venetian government to send supplies or arm a galley to defend the lordship. Following his father's death in 1382, Pietro secured permission by the Venetian government to go to Nauplia himself; by this time, in Anthony Luttrell's words, "the [Venetian] senate considered these places more or less as Venetian possessions".

When Pietro Cornaro died in 1388, Maria, unable to defend her possessions, sold them to Venice on 12 December in exchange for an annual subsidy of 700 ducats. Before the Venetians could arrive to take over the two towns, however, the Byzantine Despot of the Morea Theodore I Palaiologos (r. 1383–1407), and his ally and father-in-law Nerio I Acciaioli seized them with the aid of an Ottoman army under Evrenos. Although the Venetians were quickly able to oust Nerio from Nauplia, Argos, Kiveri and Thermisi remained in Theodore's hands until 11 June 1394, when he ceded them to Venice. After Maria's death in 1393, her uncle Engelbert—who had originally received the lordship in 1356—claimed her inheritance, but when the Venetians provided the document of sale, and suggested that they would be willing to cede the castles if he could pay for their defence and reimburse Venice for the costs of their purchase and the ongoing siege of Argos, he dropped his claim. Argos remained in Venetian hands until conquered by the Ottomans at the outbreak of the First Ottoman–Venetian War in 1463. Of Venice's territories in the Morea, Nauplia persisted longest. It was surrendered to the Ottomans in 1540, after the conclusion of the Third Ottoman–Venetian War.

== Lords of Argos and Nauplia ==
- Otto I de la Roche (1212 – before 1234) as Lord of Athens
- Otto II de la Roche (before 1234 – 1251)
- Guy I de la Roche (1251–1263) as Duke of Athens
- John I de la Roche (1263–1280) as Duke of Athens
- William de la Roche (1280–1287) as Duke of Athens
- Guy II de la Roche (1287–1308) as Duke of Athens
- Walter I of Brienne (1308–1311) as Duke of Athens
- Walter II of Brienne (1311–1356) as titular Duke of Athens
- Guy III of Enghien (1356–1376)
- Louis of Enghien (1376–1377) as steward for:
- Maria of Enghien (1377–1388) with her husband Pietro Cornaro (1377–1388)
- Sold to Venice in 1388, Argos seized and held by the Despotate of the Morea until 1394

== Sources ==
- Bon, Antoine (1969). La Morée franque. Recherches historiques, topographiques et archéologiques sur la principauté d'Achaïe [The Frankish Morea. Historical, Topographic and Archaeological Studies on the Principality of Achaea] (in French). Paris: De Boccard.
- Fine, John V. A., Jr. (1994) [1987]. The Late Medieval Balkans: A Critical Survey from the Late Twelfth Century to the Ottoman Conquest. Ann Arbor, Michigan: University of Michigan Press. ISBN 978-0-472-10079-8.
- Kondylis, Thanos (2010). "Η Αργολίδα την περίοδο 1350–1400 – Το τέλος της Φραγκοκρατίας και η αρχή της Βενετοκρατίας" [The Argolid in the period 1350–1400 – The end of Frankish and the beginning of Venetian rule]. In Maltezou, Chrysa; Panopoulou, Angeliki (eds.). Βενετία-Άργος. Σημάδια της βενετικής παρουσίας στο Άργος και στην περιοχή του, Πρακτικά της Διεθνούς Επιστημονικής Συνάντησης (Άργος, 11 Οκτωβρίου 2008) [Venice-Argos. Traces of Venetian presence in Argos and its region, Proceedings of the International Scientific Meeting (Argos, 11 October 2008)] (in Greek). Athens and Venice: Istituto Ellenico di Studi Bizantini e Postbizantini di Venezia. pp. 19–38. ISBN 978-960-7743-51-0. Archived from the original on 30 May 2011.
- Longnon, Jean (1969) [1962]. "The Frankish States in Greece, 1204–1311". In Setton, Kenneth M.; Wolff, Robert Lee; Hazard, Harry W. (eds.). A History of the Crusades, Volume II: The Later Crusades, 1189–1311. Vol. 2 (Second ed.). Madison, Milwaukee, and London: University of Wisconsin Press. pp. 234–275. ISBN 0-299-04844-6.
- Longnon, Jean (1973). "Les premiers ducs d'Athènes et leur famille". Journal des Savants (in French). 1 (1): 61–80. doi:10.3406/jds.1973.1278. ISSN 1775-383X.
- Luttrell, Anthony (1966). "The Latins of Argos and Nauplia: 1311–1394". Papers of the British School at Rome. 34. British School at Rome: 34–55. doi:10.1017/S0068246200007455. JSTOR 40310660. S2CID 179112752.
- McLeod, Wallace E. (1962). "Kiveri and Thermisi". Hesperia: The Journal of the American School of Classical Studies at Athens. 31 (4): 378–392. doi:10.2307/147236. ISSN 0018-098X. JSTOR 147236.
- Setton, Kenneth M. (1976). The Papacy and the Levant (1204–1571), Volume I: The Thirteenth and Fourteenth Centuries. Vol. 1. Philadelphia: The American Philosophical Society. ISBN 0-87169-114-0.
- Topping, Peter (1975). "The Morea, 1311–1364". In Setton, Kenneth M.; Hazard, Harry W. (eds.). A History of the Crusades, Volume III: The Fourteenth and Fifteenth Centuries. Vol. 3. Madison and London: University of Wisconsin Press. pp. 104–140. ISBN 0-299-06670-3.
- Topping, Peter (1975). "The Morea, 1364–1460". In Setton, Kenneth M.; Hazard, Harry W. (eds.). A History of the Crusades, Volume III: The Fourteenth and Fifteenth Centuries. Vol. 3. Madison and London: University of Wisconsin Press. pp. 141–166. ISBN 0-299-06670-3.
- Topping, Peter W. (2000). "The Southern Argolid from Byzantine to Ottoman Times". In Sutton, Susan Buck (ed.). Contingent Countryside: Settlement, Economy, and Land Use in the Southern Argolid Since 1700. Stanford University Press. pp. 25–40. ISBN 978-0-804733151.
