= Pietro Cornaro =

Lord of Argos and Nauplia

Pietro Cornaro, also known as Peter Cornaro or Corner (died in 1387 or 1388), was Lord of Argos and Nauplia in Frankish Greece from 1377.

== Early life ==
Pietro was the son of Federico Cornaro of the Santa Lucia branch. He was born before 1363. Being one of the wealthiest Venetian patricians of his age, Federigo could afford to conduct his own foreign policy. Historian Anthony Luttrell proposes that Federigo arranged Pietro's marriage with Maria of Enghien, Lady of Argos and Nauplia, in 1377 most probably because he wanted to establish a commercial basis in the Peloponnese. The Senate of Venice authorized him on 16 July 1377 to arm a galley and to transport Maria to Venice.

== Lord of Argos and Nauplia ==
Pietro's marriage with Maria made him her co-ruler in 1377, but he was still young. His father took care of the defense of Argos and Nauplia and sent supplies to the two towns in 1378. Federigo also bought a galley to defend the lordship against pirates in 1381. Heavy taxation during the War of Chioggia and a financial crisis menaced the family's position, but Pietro could keep his lordship after his father died in 1382. Pietro went to Argos to command the defense of Argos and Nauplia against the pirates in 1383. He returned to Venice, but he was planning to again visit his lordship in early 1385. Pietro was one of the lords in Frankish Greece whom King Peter IV of Aragon informed about his appointment of Bernard of Cornella as his vicar-general in the Duchy of Athens on 17 August 1387. Pietro died in 1387 or 1388. His widow sold the lordship to Venice on 12 December 1388.

== Sources ==
- Luttrell, Anthony (1966). "The Latins of Argos and Nauplia: 1311-1394". Papers of the British School at Rome. 34. British School at Rome: 34–55. doi:10.1017/S0068246200007455. JSTOR 40310660. S2CID 179112752.
- Setton, Kenneth M. (1975). "The Catalans and Florentines in Greece, 1311–1462". In Setton, Kenneth M.; Hazard, Harry W. (eds.). A History of the Crusades, Volume III: The Fourteenth and Fifteenth Centuries. Vol. 3. Madison and London: University of Wisconsin Press. pp. 225–277. ISBN 0-299-06670-3.

Preceded by Maria of Enghien	Lord of Argos and Nauplia; 1377–1387/1388 with Maria of Enghien	Succeeded by Maria of Enghien
