= Armorial of the House of Lusignan =

Coats of arms, flags, and badges

The coats of arms, flags, and badges of the House of Lusignan, royal family in the Levant during the Crusades.

== First House of Lusignan ==
Including attributed arms.

=== French Nobility ===
Blazon	Period	Description
	885–1192	Lords of Lusignan Barry of ten argent and azure Motto: Pour loyauté maintenir "To maintain loyalty"
	1192–1393	Lords of Lusignan, Counts of La Marche, and Angoulême Barry silver and azure eight rooms, a lion gules armed langued and crowned with gold stitching on the whole.
	1221–1250	Personal Arms of Hugh XI Barry silver and azure, charged with six cubs reds brochants, posed three, two and one.
	1250–1270	Personal Arms of Hugh XII Barry silver and azure, charged with six cubs gold brochants, posed three, two and one.
	?-1274	Personal Arms of Geoffroy I of Lusignan (Jarnac) (c. 1223/24-b. 1274), lord of Jarnac, Château-Larcher and Châteauneuf: 1. Barry silver and azure, charged with a lion rampant-brochant gules, debruised by a four-point label gules (according to his 1246 seal).; 2. Barry silver and azure, charged with a lion rampant-brochant gules (according to his 1248 and 1269 seals).

==== Cognac ====
Blazon	Period	Description
	12th-13th Century	Lords of Cognac Barry silver and azure eight parts, the label Gules.

==== Lezay ====
Blazon	Period	Description
	12th-13th Century	Lords of Lezay Barry silver and azure, nine martlets in orle gules surmounted to fair canton gules .

==== Vouvant ====
Blazon	Period	Description
	12th-13th Century	Geoffroy I and II of Lusignan (Vouvant), lords of Vouvant and Mervent Barry of ten argent and azure a lion counter-rampant gules. Motto: QVI PLVS MORTIS CONPTEMTOR QVAM LEO FORTIS "Who fears death less than lion's strength."

==== Issoudun ====
Blazon	Period	Description
	13th Century	Counts of Eu and Lords of Issoudun Raoul Ier, first lord of Issoudun and count of Eu, was the younger brother of Hugh IX of Lusignan. Barry of ten argent and azure a label of three points gules

==== Rochefoucauld ====
Blazon	Period	Description
	10th-12th Century	Lords of Rochefoucauld Barry of ten argent and azure three chevrons that in chief couped gules Motto: C'est mon plaisir "It was my pleasure"

==== Parthenay ====
Blazon	Period	Description
	11th-15th Century	Lords of Parthenay and Retz Barry of ten argent and azure a bend gules

=== English Nobility ===
==== Valence ====
Blazon	Period	Description
	1225–1247	Guillaume de Lusignan Personal arms of Guillaume de Lusignan, uterine half brother of King Henry III Barry of ten argent and azure a label of five points gules on each point three lions. Supported with a wyvern on each side.
	1247–1324	Lords of Valencia, Earls of Pembroke and Wexford Guillaume de Lusignan, known as William de Valence, moved with his brothers and sister to England the request of their half brother King Henry III. Henry made William the Earl of Pembroke. Barry of ten Argent and Azure an orle of martlets Gules

==== Hastings ====
Blazon	Period	Description
	1313–1389	Earls of Pembroke Quarterly, 1 and 4, or, a maunch gules (for Hastings); 2 and 3, barruly argent and azure, an orle of martlets (for Valence)

=== Jerusalem Royal Family ===
Blazon	Period	Description
	1159–1268	Kings of Jerusalem Personal arms of Guy de Lusignan, then used as the arms of the Lusignan Kings of Jerusalem after his death until 1268. Quarterly, 1 and 4 in blue with the silver cross and 2 and 3 barry silver and azure eight rooms, a lion rampant, armed, langued and crowned with gold stitching on the whole.
	1335–1385	Prince of Galilee Quarterly, 1 and 4 in silver, a cross of gold, between four crosses of the same and 2 and 3 barry silver and azure eight rooms, a lion gules armed langued and crowned with gold stitching on the whole.

=== Royal Family of Jerusalem and Cyprus ===
Blazon	Period	Description
	1194–1268	Kings of Cyprus The kingdoms of Jerusalem and Cyprus split following the death of Guy until they were reunited in 1268 by King Hugh III of Cyprus. Barry silver and azure eight rooms, a lion gules armed langued and crowned with gold stitching on the whole.
	1268–1393	Kings of Cyprus and Jerusalem Quarterly, 1 and 4 in silver, a cross of gold, between four crosses of the same and 2 and 3 barry silver and azure eight rooms, a lion gules armed langued and crowned with gold stitching on the whole.
	1314–1319	Queen of Aragon

== Second House of Lusignan ==
=== Royal Family of Jerusalem, Cyprus, and Armenia ===
Blazon	Period	Description
	1342–1382	Kings of Armenia Advantage of both, 1 gold lion rampant, armed, langued and crowned azure, 2 silver, a cross of gold, between four crosses of the same and 3 barry money and azure eight rooms, a lion rampant, armed, langued and crowned with gold stitching on the whole. Motto: Pour loyauté maintenir "To maintain loyalty"
	1393–	Kings of Armenia, Cyprus, and Jerusalem. Quartered, 1 in silver, a cross of gold, between four crosses of the same, 2 barry silver and azure eight rooms, a lion rampant, armed, langued and crowned with gold, stitching on the whole, 3 gold lion rampant, armed, langued and crowned azure and 4 silver lion rampant, armed, langued and crowned with gold. Motto: Pour loyauté maintenir "To maintain loyalty"

== Flags ==
Flag	Period	Description
	12th-14th Centuries	Flag of Lusignan Kings of Cyprus Flag from Kyrenia Castle. The fleur-de-lis symbolised the Lusignan's French ancestry and the cross symbolized Jerusalem and the Holy Sepulchre.
Flag	Period	Description
	14th Century	Flag of Lusignan Kings of Armenia

== Symbols ==
Roses, lions, dragons and mermaids were Lusignan symbols and heraldic elements.
