= Palazzo Barzizza =

Coordinates: 45°26′13″N 12°19′58″E

Palazzo Barzizza is a restructured formerly Gothic-style palace located on the Canal Grande of Venice, adjacent to the Palazzo Giustinian Businello in the Sestiere of San Polo, Venice, Italy. The opposite palace is Palazzo Cavalli.

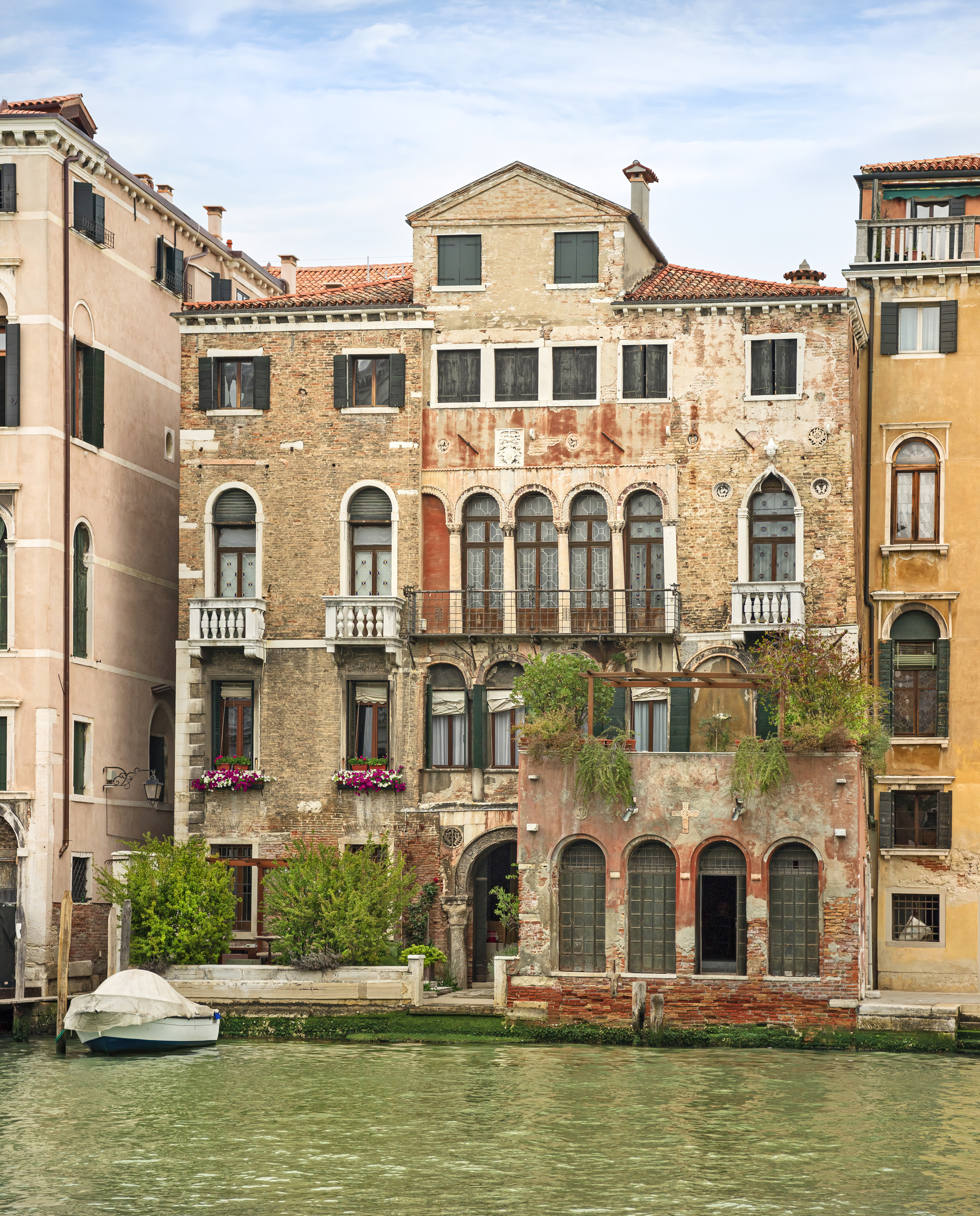
Palazzo Barzizza

== History ==
The palace was erected in typical Fondaco style, with warehouses in the base and residence atop, by the Contarini family in the 13th-century. It has undergone a number of refurbishments over the centuries. The Barzizza acquired the palace in the 18th-century.

The 16th-century ground-floor portal is partly hidden by a protrusion into the canal.

== Bibliography ==
- Guida d'Italia – Venezia ed Milano, Touring Editore, 2007. ISBN 978-88-365-4347-2.
