= Sant'Aponal =

Church in Venice, Italy

- Sant'Aponal facade

- Location within Venice Location within Italy

Religion
- Affiliation: Roman Catholic
- Province: Venice

Location
- Location: Venice, Italy
- Interactive map of Sant'Aponal
- Coordinates: 45°26′17″N 12°19′55″E

Architecture
- Completed: 15th century

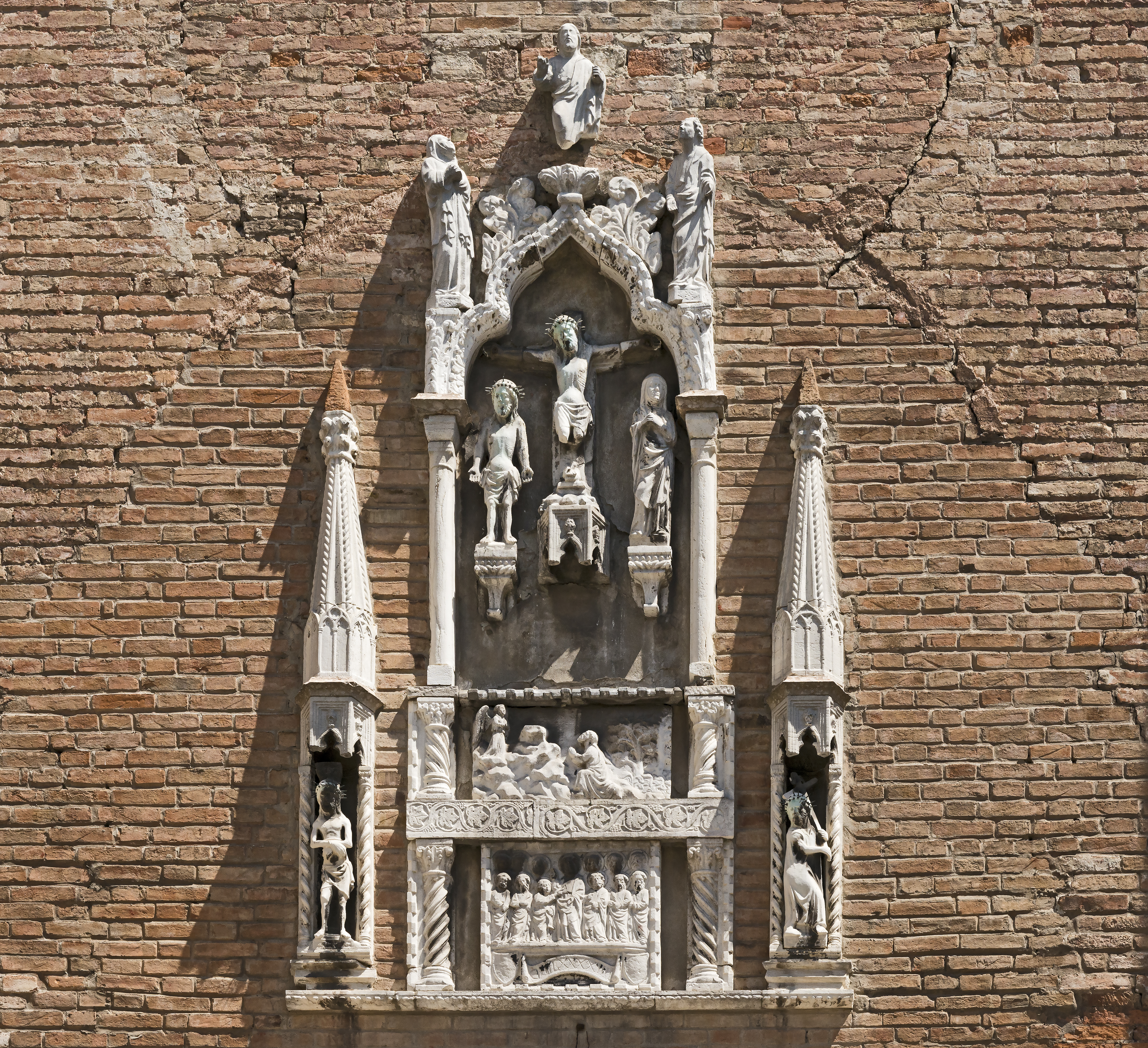
Gothic bas-relief on the facade

The church of Sant'Aponal is a deconsecrated Roman Catholic church in the sestiere of San Polo in Venice, Italy.

The church was founded in the 11th century, by refugees from Ravenna and dedicated to Apollinaris of Ravenna. Restored over the centuries, it underwent major reconstruction in the 15th century. During the Napoleonic occupation, it was deconsecrated and only reconsecrated in 1851. For a time it was used as a prison for political prisoners. It was re-closed in 1984, and is now mainly an archive. The facade retains bits of Gothic architecture decoration.

== Sources ==
- Patriarch of Venice, entry on church
- Guide d'Italia (serie Guide Rosse) - Venezia - Touring Club Italiano - pagg. 384-385 ISBN 978-88-365-4347-2
