= Maria of Enghien, Lady of Argos and Nauplia =

14th-century Greek noblewoman

Maria of Enghien

Lady of Argos and Nauplia
- Reign: 1376/1377–1388
- Predecessor: Guy of Enghien
- Regent: Louis of Enghien
- Born: after 1363
- Died: 1392/1393
- Spouse: Pietro Cornaro; Pascale Zane
- Father: Guy of Enghien
- Mother: Bonne de Foucherolles
- Religion: Roman Catholic

Maria of Enghien, also known as Marie of Enghien or d'Enghien (after 1363–1392/1393), was the Lady of Argos and Nauplia in Frankish Greece from 1376 or 1377 to 1388. She inherited the estate from her father, Guy of Enghien, when she was a minor. Her paternal uncle, Louis of Enghien, served as her regent. Louis gave Maria in marriage to a Venetian patrician, Pietro Cornaro, in 1377. Maria moved to Venice, but she was involved in the administration of her lordship. After her husband died, she sold the lordship to the Republic of Venice for a regular income in 1388.

== Early life ==
Maria was born after 1363 to Guy of Enghien, Lord of Argos and Nauplia, and Bonne de Foucherolles. Being her parents' only child, she was the heiress apparent to her father's lordship when she was engaged to Joan de Lluria, the Catalan lord of Stiris in the Duchy of Athens in 1371. Although the marriage project was confirmed in the last months of the year, it was never concluded.

== Lady of Argos and Nauplia ==
Maria inherited Argos and Nauplia when her father died shortly after October 1376. She was still a minor and her uncle, Louis of Enghien, Count of Conversano, administered her lordship as her guardian. He married off Maria to Pietro Cornaro, the son of a wealthy Venetian patrician, Federigo Cornaro. The treaty about the marriage was signed in Venice on 17 May 1377. About two months later, the Senate of Venice authorized Federigo Cornaro to bring Maria to Venice. Thereafter, Federigo Cornaro looked after the defence of Argos and Nauplia against the Turks and pirates.

Maria and her husband administered the lordship together. For instance, they jointly confirmed Louis of Enghien's previous land grant to a local nobleman. Pietro died before 1388 and Marie started negotiations about the sale of her lordship to Venice, because she could not defend it. Both Argos and Nauplia were located at strategically important places and the Senate accepted the offer. On 12 December 1388, Maria sold her lordship in return for an annual income payable to her and her descendants as long as Venice held Argos and Nauplia.

== Later life ==
Maria married Pascale Zane in 1388. She died in Venice in 1393 or earlier. She left no children from either marriage. Her uncle Engelbert of Enghien approached the Venetian senate, demanding the lordship of Argos and Nauplia, but he was soon informed about the sale of the lordship.

== Sources ==
- Lock, Peter (1995). The Franks in the Aegean, 1204–1500. Longman. ISBN 0-582-05140-1.
- Luttrell, Anthony (1966). "The Latins of Argos and Nauplia: 1311–1394". Papers of the British School at Rome. 34. British School at Rome: 34–55. doi:10.1017/S0068246200007455. JSTOR 40310660. S2CID 179112752.
- Setton, Kenneth M. (1975). "The Catalans and Florentines in Greece, 1311–1462". In Setton, Kenneth M.; Hazard, Harry W. (eds.). A History of the Crusades, Volume III: The Fourteenth and Fifteenth Centuries. Vol. 3. Madison and London: University of Wisconsin Press. pp. 225–277. ISBN 0-299-06670-3.
- Topping, Peter (1975). "The Morea, 1364–1460". In Setton, Kenneth M.; Hazard, Harry W. (eds.). A History of the Crusades, Volume III: The Fourteenth and Fifteenth Centuries. Vol. 3. Madison and London: University of Wisconsin Press. pp. 141–166. ISBN 0-299-06670-3.

Preceded by Guy of Enghien	Lady of Argos and Nauplia; 1376/1377–1388 with Pietro Cornaro	Sale of the lordship to Venice
