= Arnay-sous-Vitteaux =

- Commune
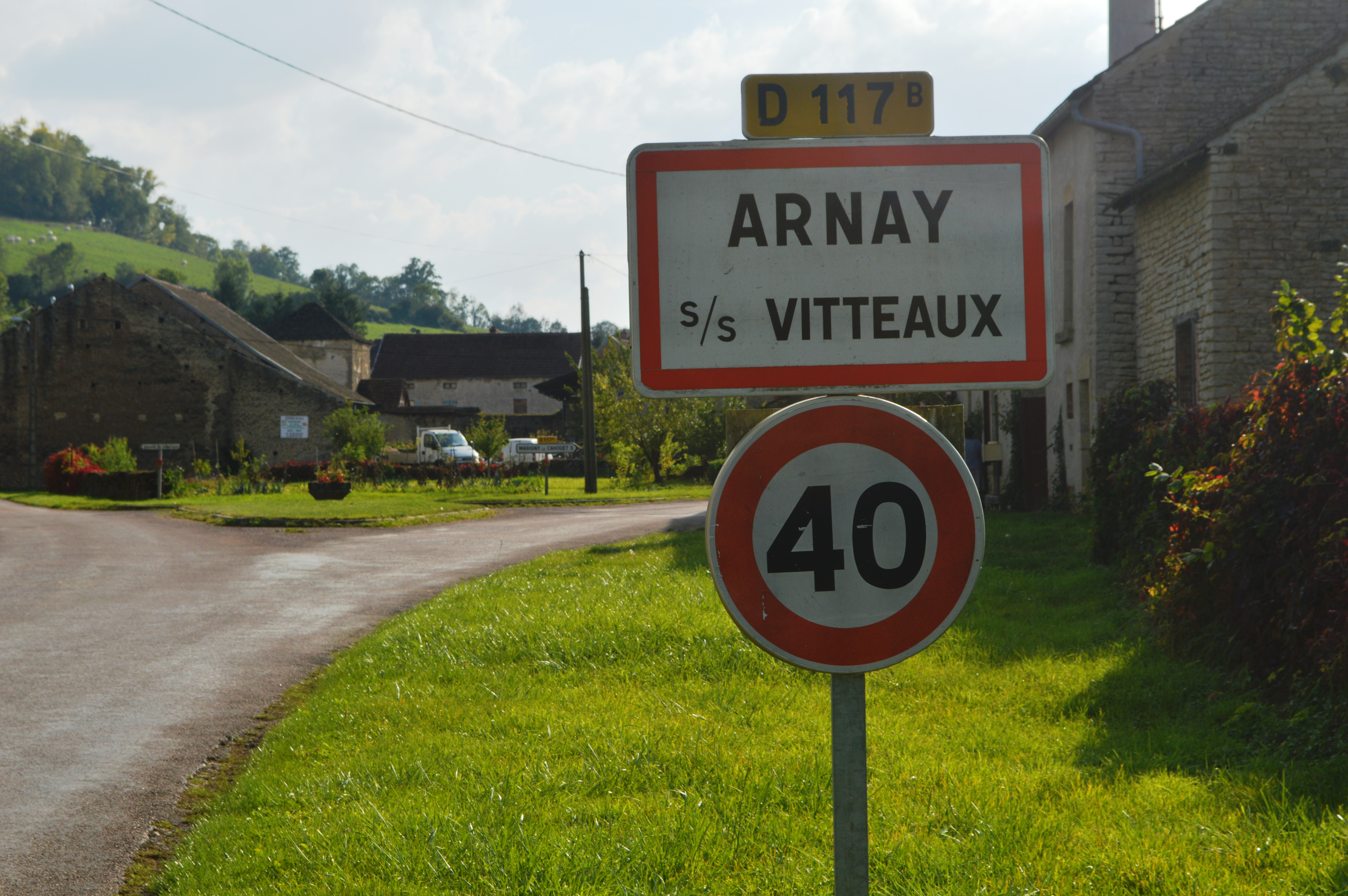
- The road into Arnay-sous-Vitteaux
- Location of Arnay-sous-Vitteaux
- Location within France Location within Bourgogne-Franche-Comté
- Coordinates: 47°26′49″N 4°29′54″E
- Country: France
- Region: Bourgogne-Franche-Comté
- Department: Côte-d'Or
- Arrondissement: Montbard
- Canton: Semur-en-Auxois
- Intercommunality: CC Terres Auxois

Government
  - Mayor (2020–2026): Jean François Lallemant
- Area^{1}: 12.14 km^{2} (4.69 sq mi)
- Elevation: 235 m (771 ft)
- Highest elevation: 482 m (1,581 ft)
- Lowest elevation: 277 m (909 ft)
- Population (2023): 113
  - Density: 9.31/km^{2} (24.1/sq mi)
- Time zone: UTC+01:00 (CET)
  - Summer (DST): UTC+02:00 (CEST)
- INSEE/Postal code: 21024 /21350
- ^{1} French Land Register data, which excludes lakes, ponds, glaciers > 1 km^{2} (0.386 sq mi or 247 acres) and river estuaries.

Arnay-sous-Vitteaux (French pronunciation: [aʁnɛ su vito], literally Arnay under Vitteaux) is a commune in the Côte-d'Or department in the Bourgogne-Franche-Comté region of eastern France.

== Geography ==
Arnay-sous-Vitteaux is located some 50 km north-west of Dijon and 35 km south-east of Montbard. Access to the commune is by the D905 road from Vitteaux in the south passing through the east of the commune and continuing north to Venarey-les-Laumes. Access to the village is by the D1178 from Marigny-le-Cahouët in the north-west passing through the village then north-east to join the D905. There are forests in the west, centre, and east of the commune with the rest being farmland.

The Brenne river passes through the commune from south to north parallel to and west of the D905. The Ruisseau de Chassaigne rises in the south of the commune and flows north through the village to join the Brenne east of the village.

== Administration ==
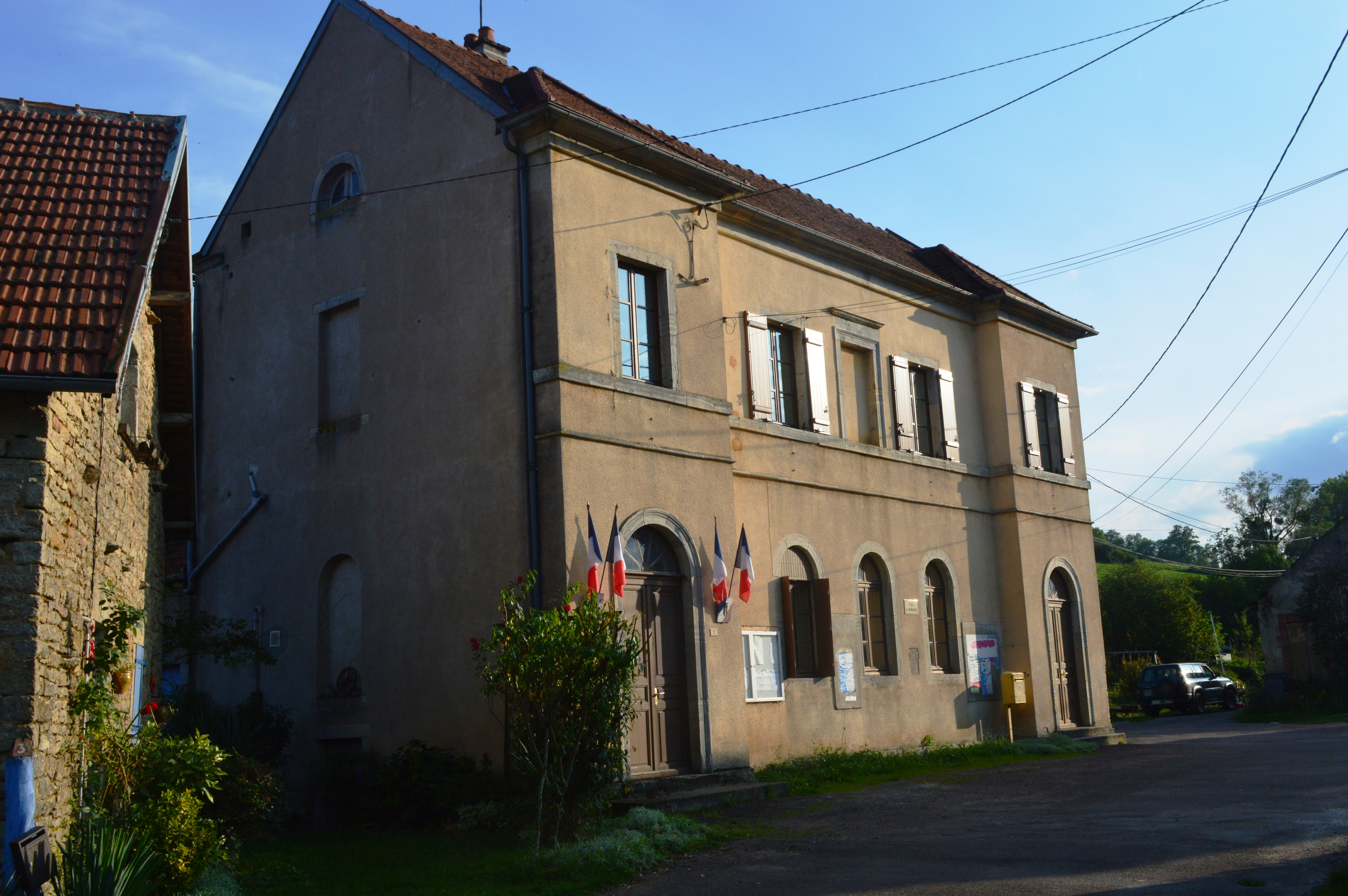
The Town Hall

List of Successive Mayors

From	To	Name
2001	2014	André Gras
2014	2026	Jean François Lallemant

== Demography ==
The inhabitants of the commune are known as Arnétois or Arnétoises in French.

Historical population

Year	Pop.	±% p.a.
1793	344	—
1821	385	+0.40%
1846	376	−0.09%
1872	293	−0.95%
1901	241	−0.67%
1926	186	−1.03%
1946	135	−1.59%
1962	208	+2.74%
1968	183	−2.11%

Year	Pop.	±% p.a.
1975	154	−2.43%
1982	170	+1.42%
1990	160	−0.75%
1999	146	−1.01%
2007	123	−2.12%
2012	108	−2.57%
2017	111	+0.55%
2023	113	+0.30%

Source: EHESS and INSEE

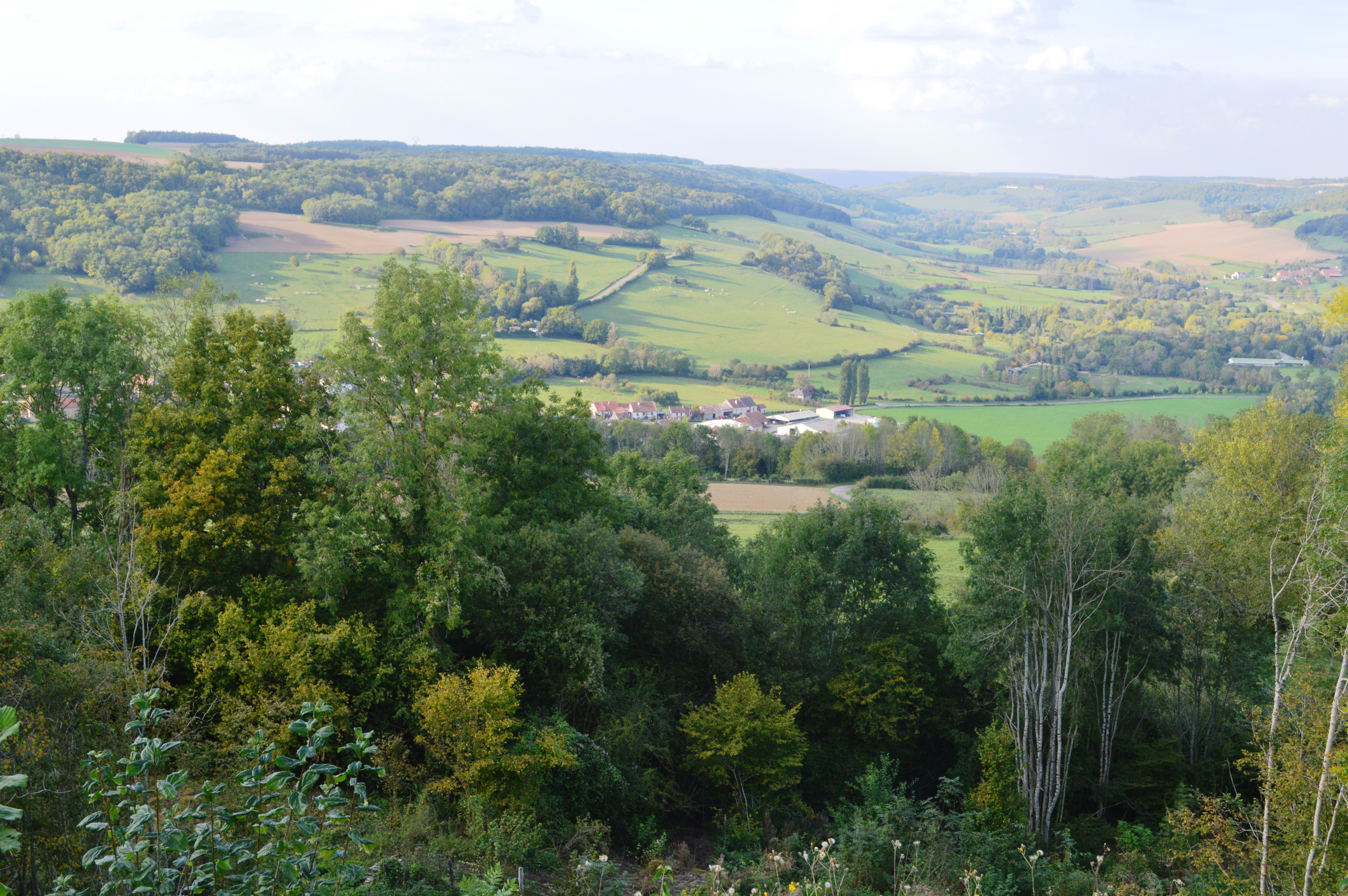
View over Arnay-sous-Vitteaux

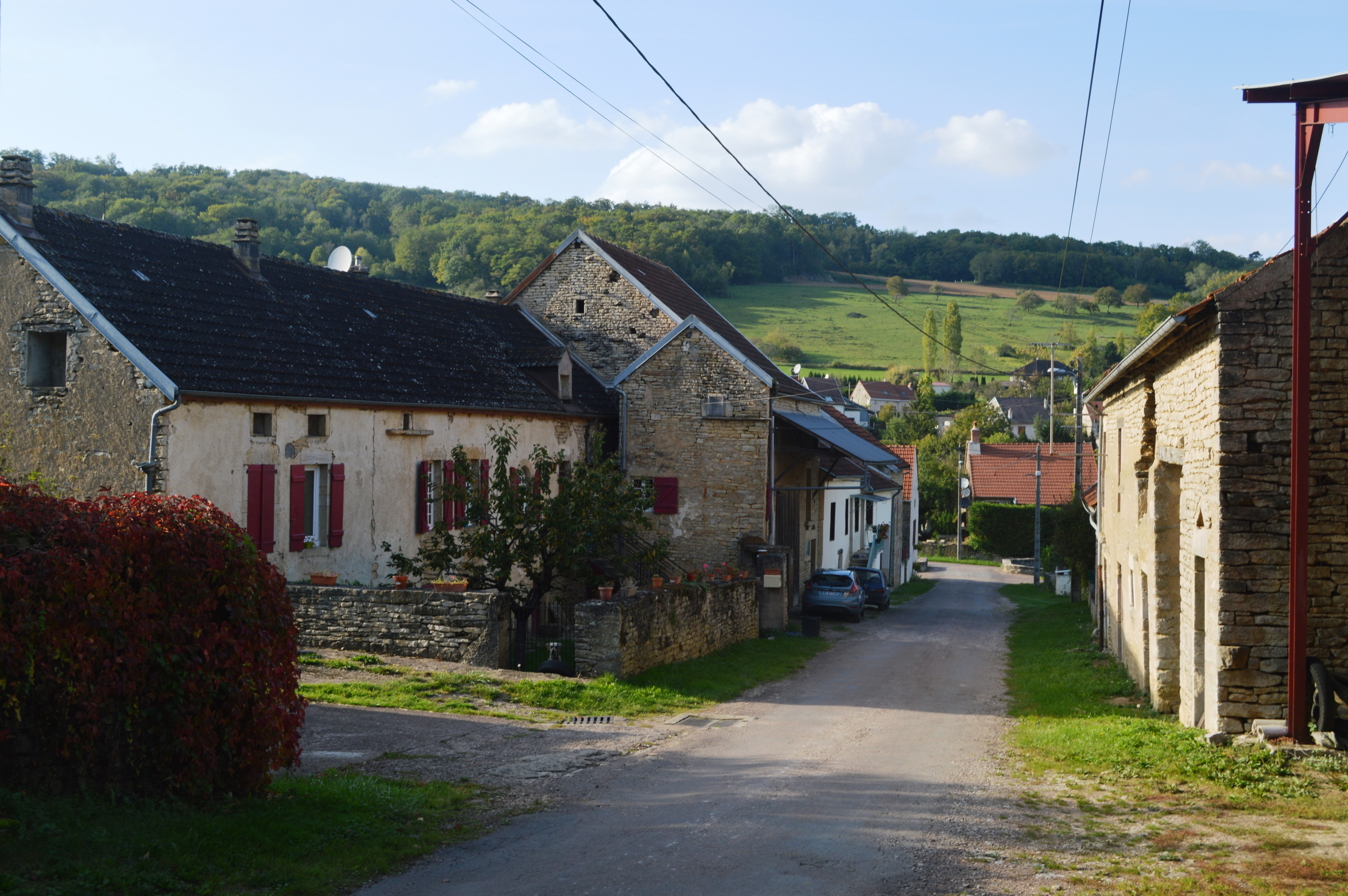
A street in Arnay-sous-Vitteaux

== Sites and monuments ==
- The Fortified house of Arnay.
- The Chapel of Saint Abdon.
- The Parish Church of Saint Alban contains several items that are registered as historical objects:
  - A Stained glass window: Virgin and child with donors (15th century)
  - A Statue: Saint Catherine (16th century)
  - A Monumental Painting: a Bishop and a Consecrational Cross (16th century)
  - A Stained glass window (17th century)

=== Gallery of Historical Items ===
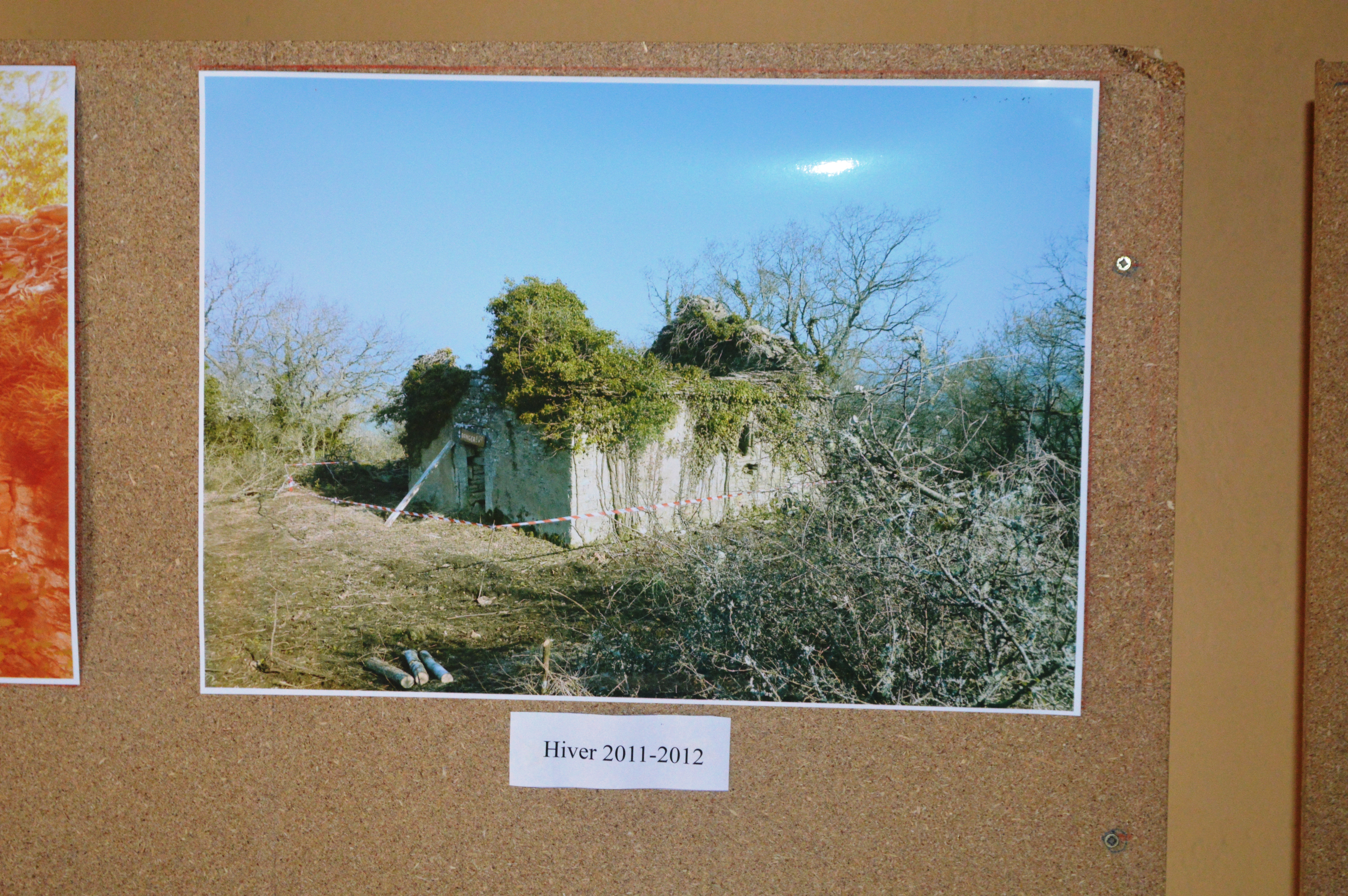
The Chapel of Abdon in 2012 before restoration

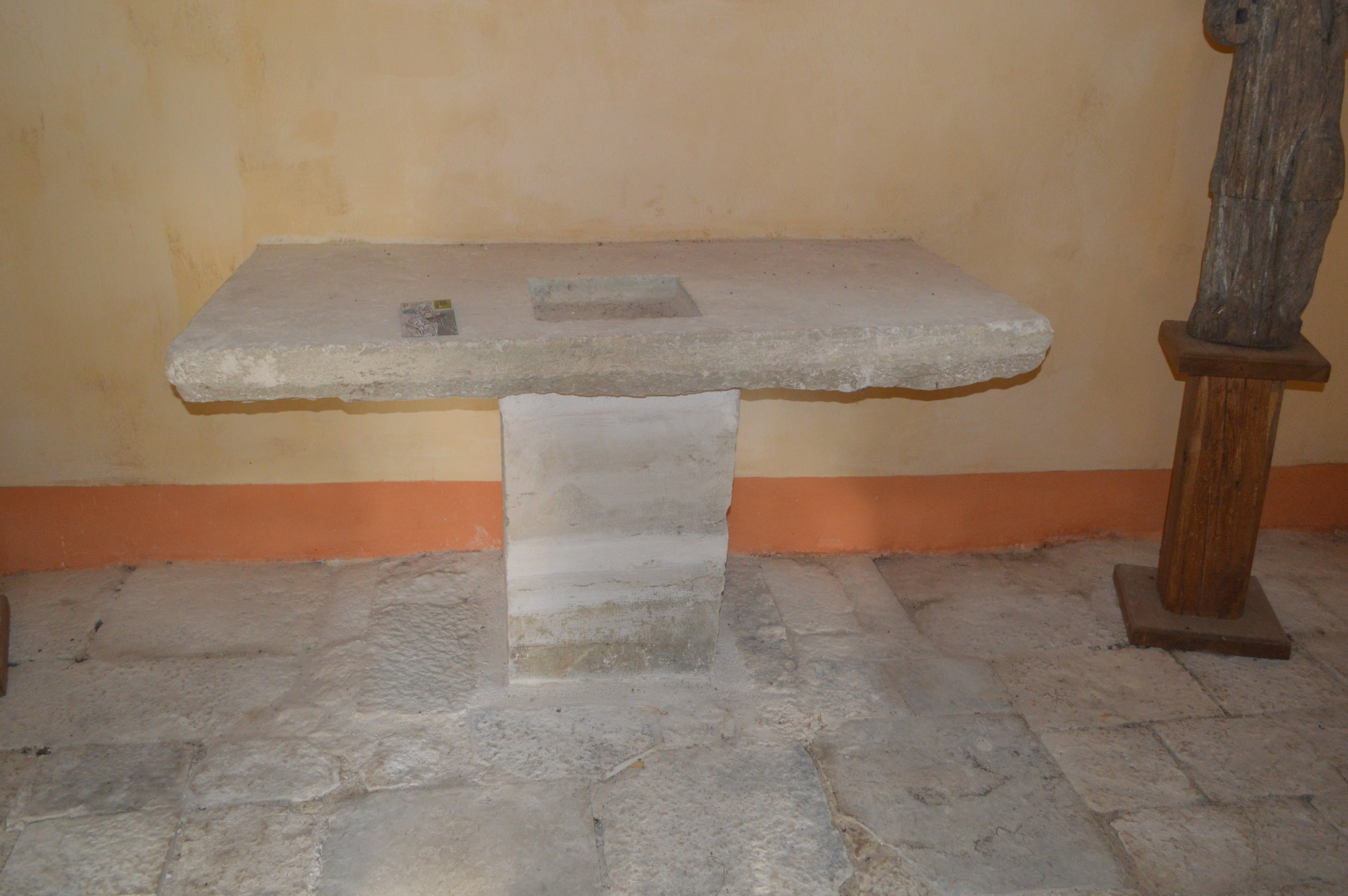
The original stone altar in the Chapel of Saint Abdon

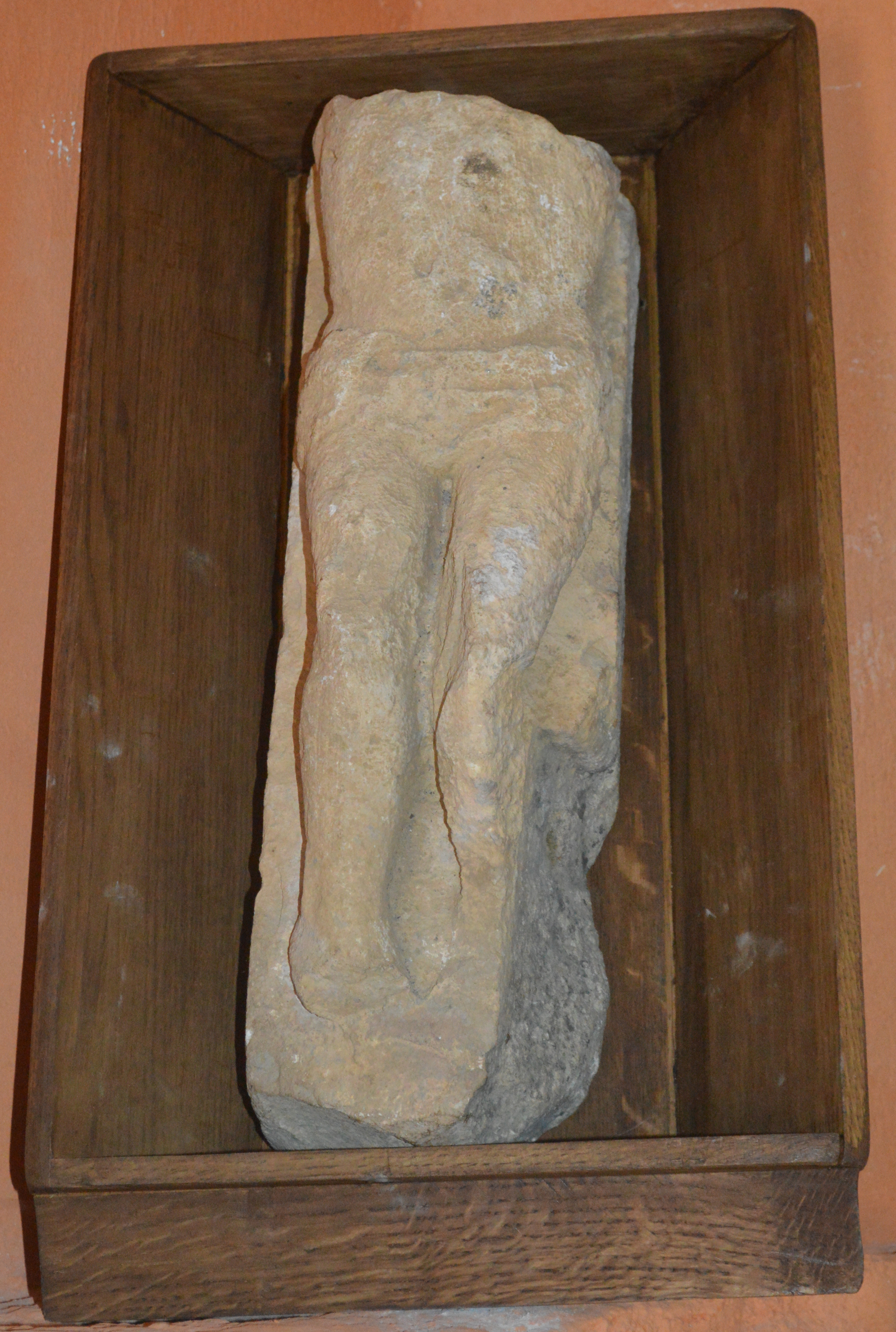
A Fragment of a Calvary dated 1502 in the Chapel of Abdon

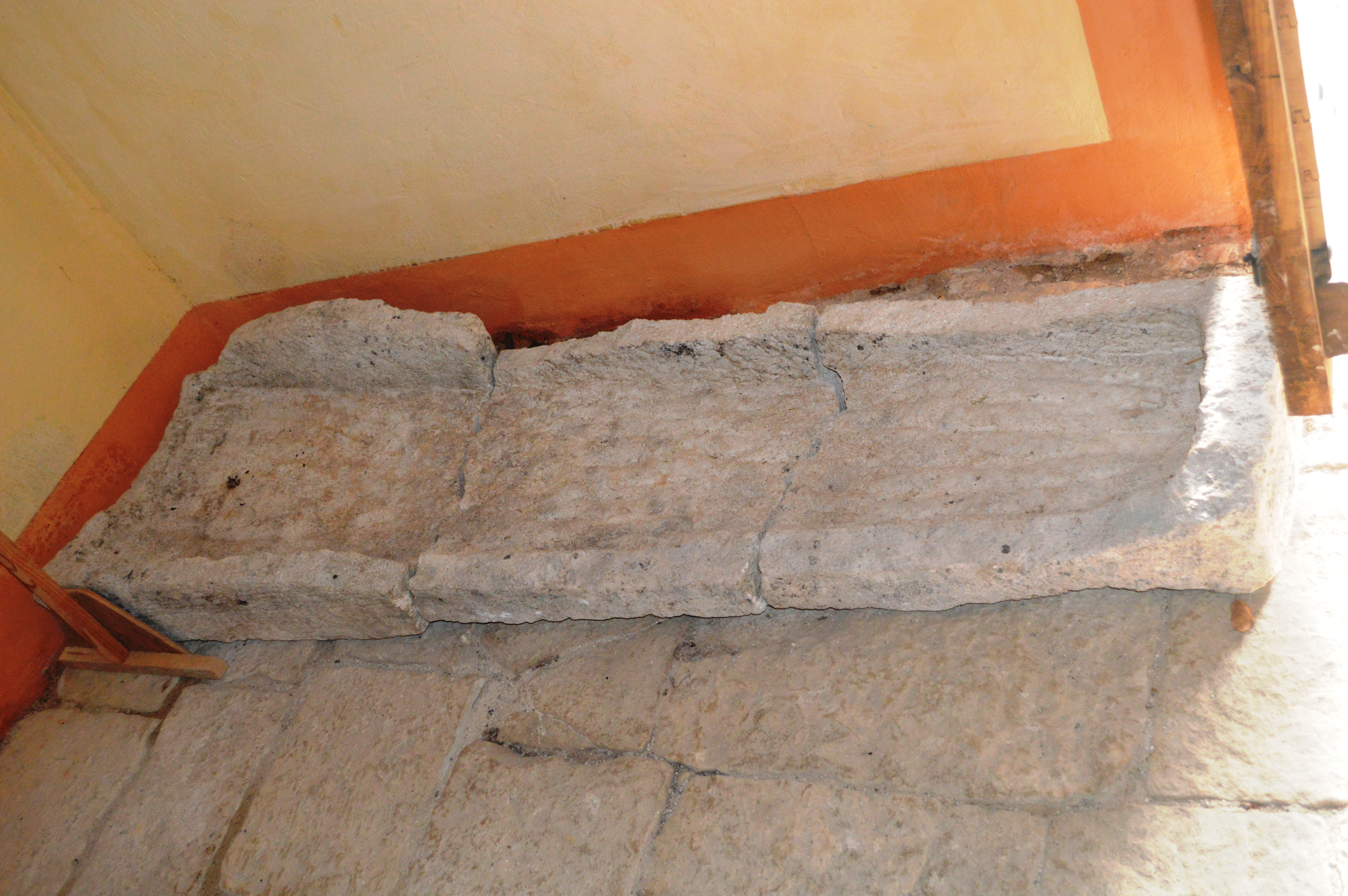
An ancient Sarcophagus in the Chapel of Saint Abdon discovered nearby

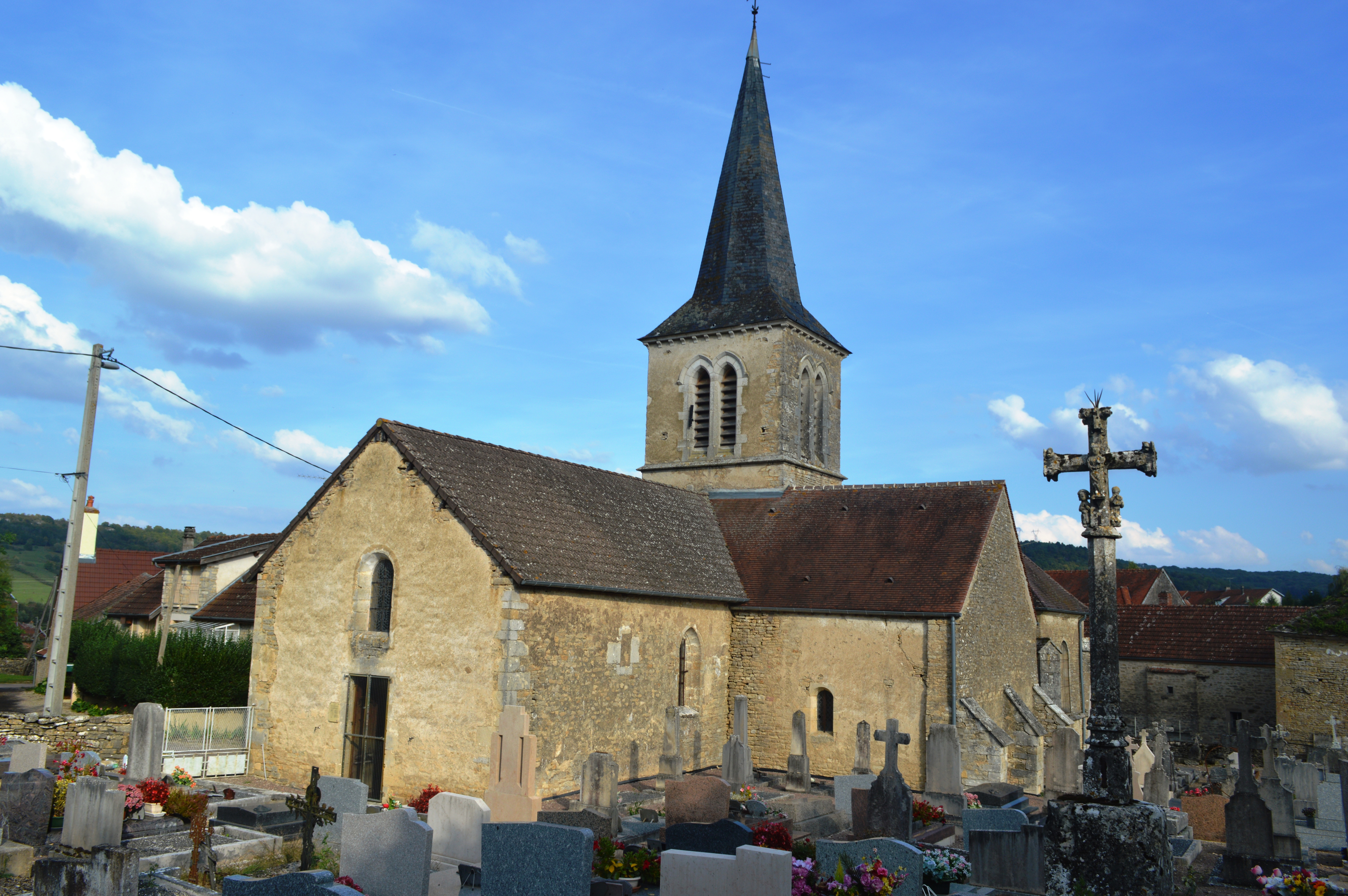
The Church of Saint Alban

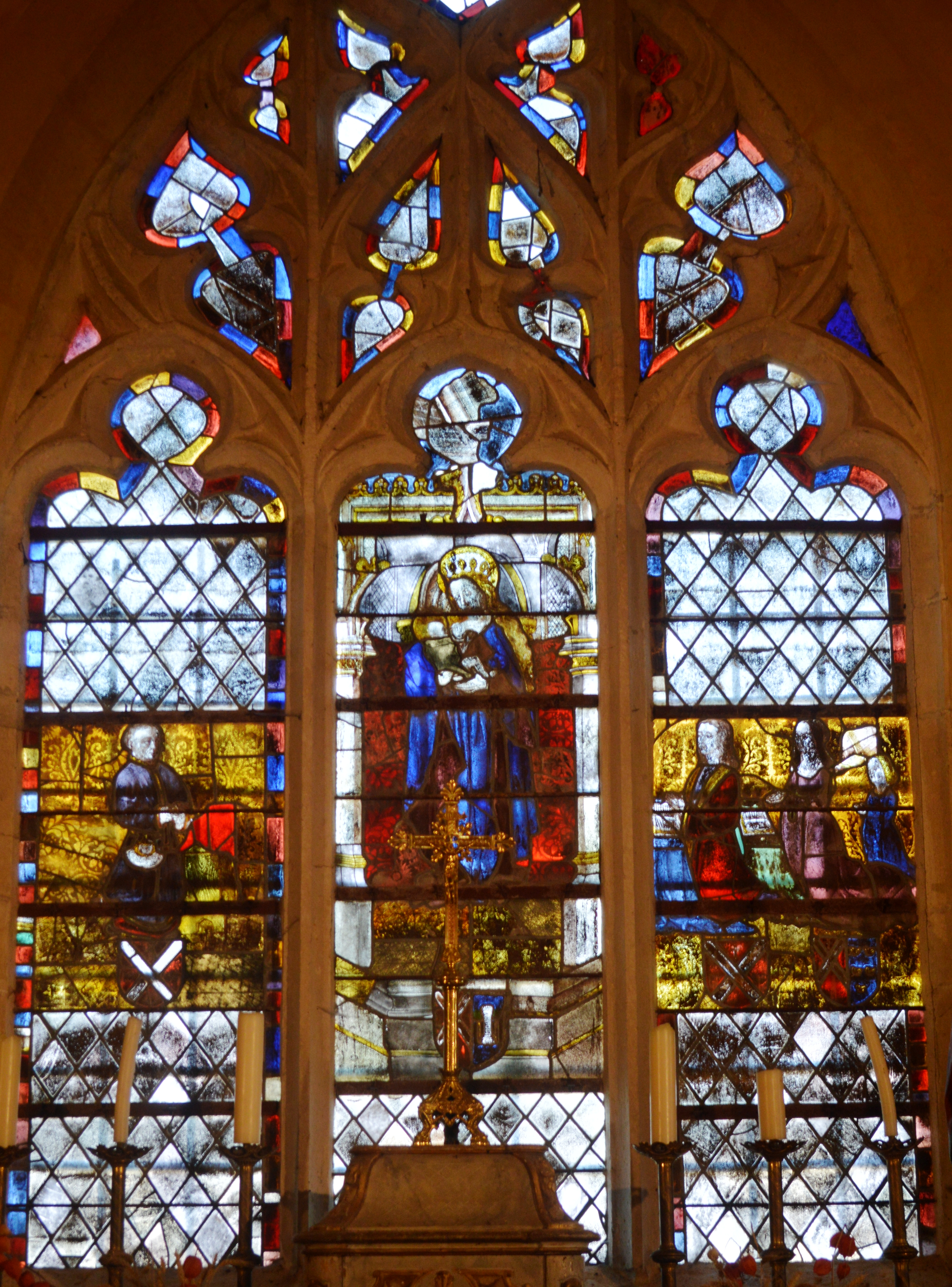
The Stained glass window: Virgin and child with donors

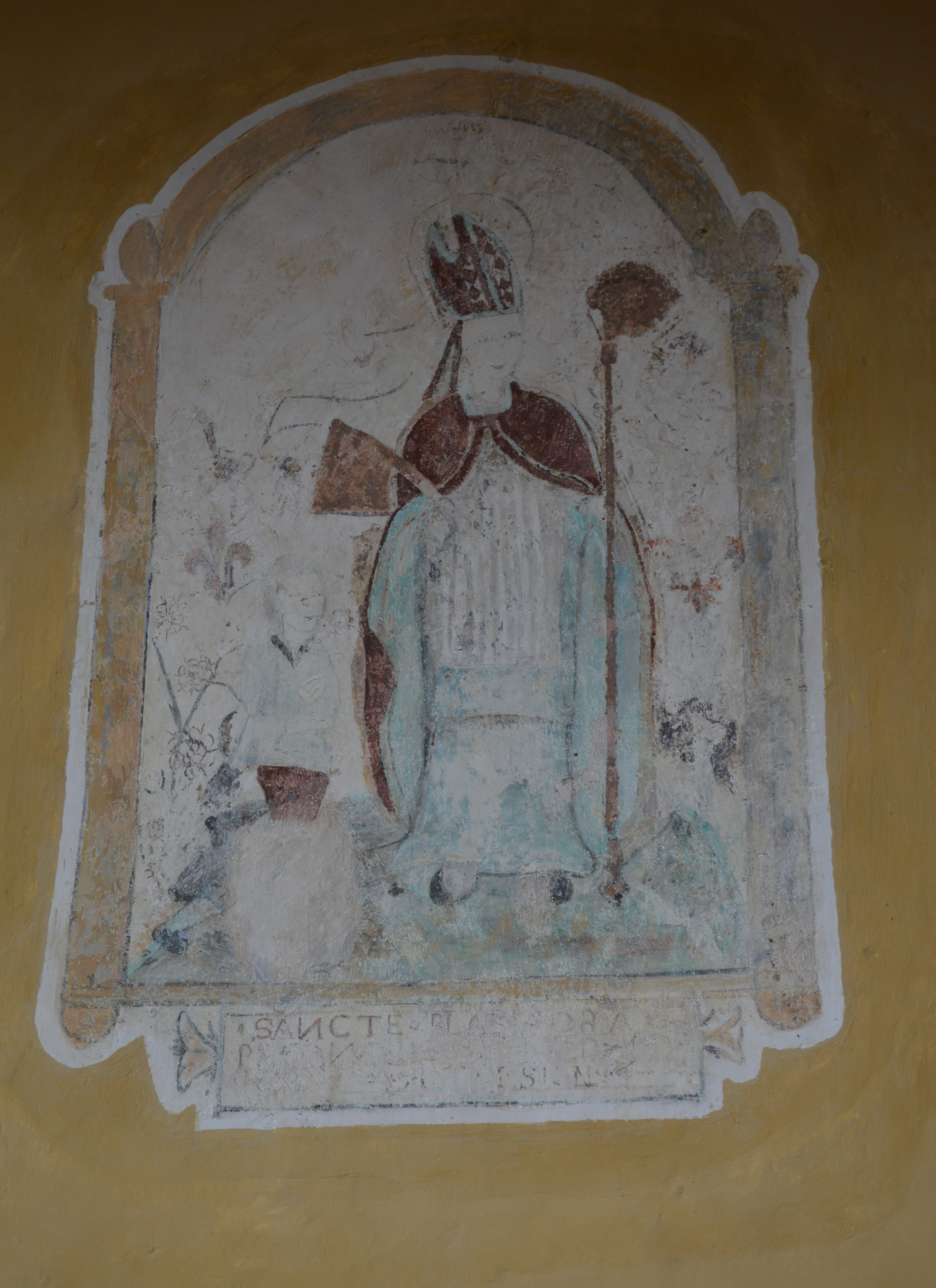
The Monumental Painting: a Bishop and a Consecrational Cross

== See also ==
- Communes of the Côte-d'Or department
