= Francesco Pisani =

Italian Cardinal

His Eminence Francesco Pisani
- Cardinal-Bishop of Ostia
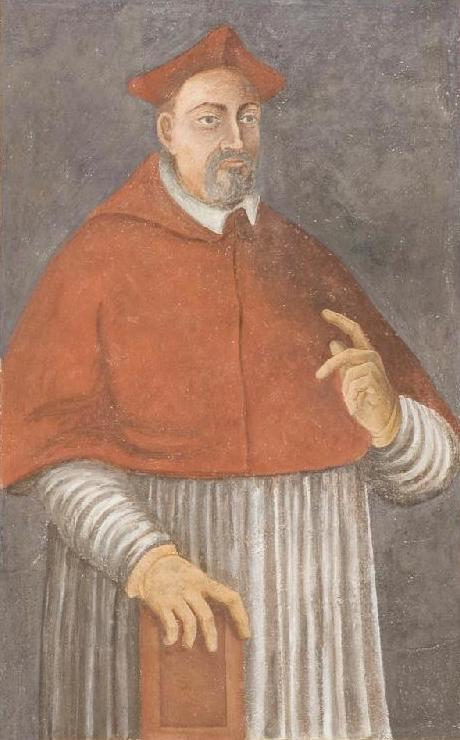
- Church: Roman Catholic Church
- Diocese: Ostia
- Appointed: 12 May 1564
- Term ended: 28 June 1570

Orders
- Consecration: 5 May 1527 by Alessandro Farnèse
- Created cardinal: 1 July 1517 by Pope Leo X

Personal details
- Born: 1494 Venice, Republic of Venice
- Died: 28 June 1570 (aged 76) Rome, Papal States
- Buried: San Marco
- Parents: Alvise Pisani, Cecilia Giustinian
- Coat of arms

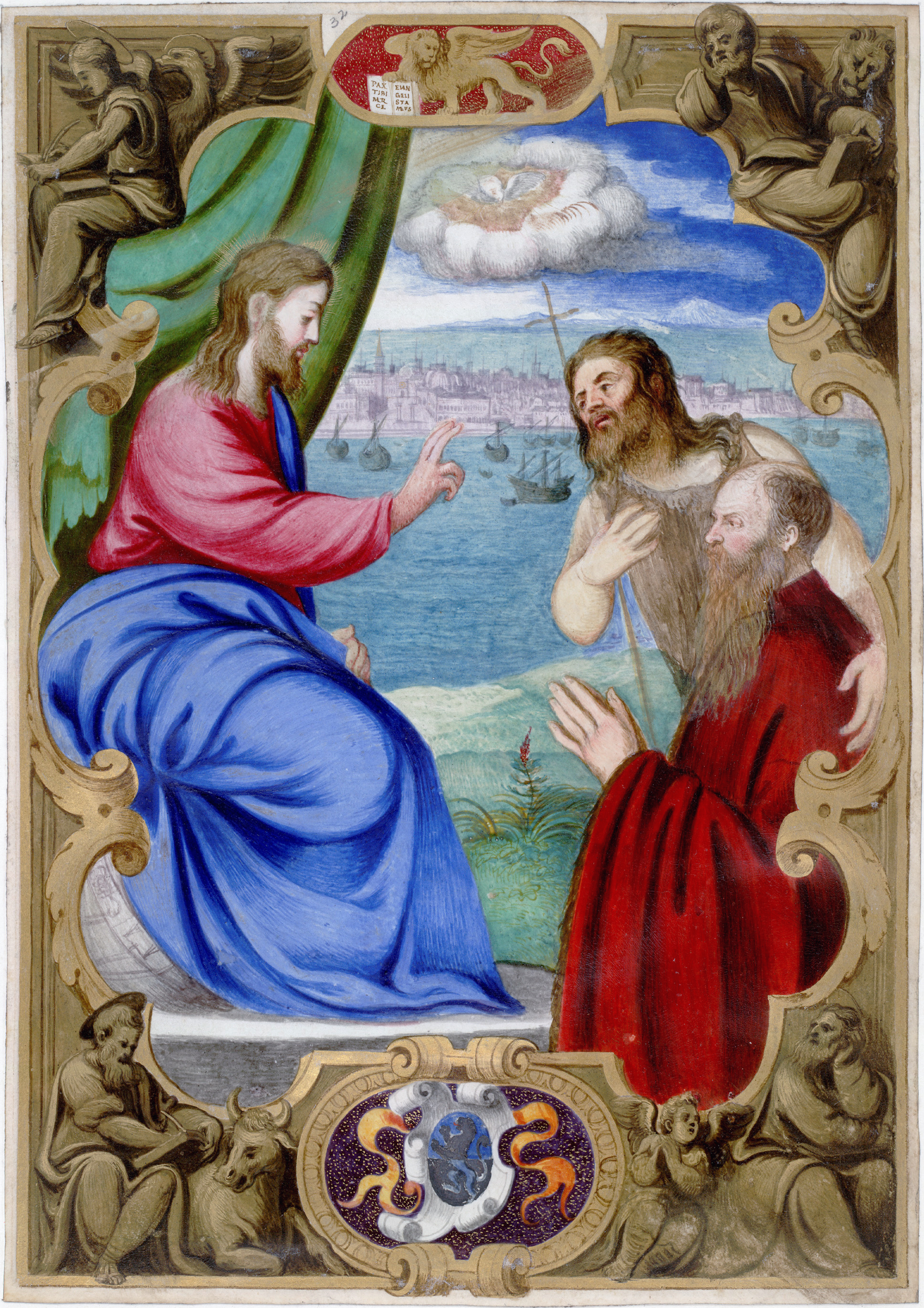
Francesco Pisani presented by John the Baptist to Christ who blesses him.

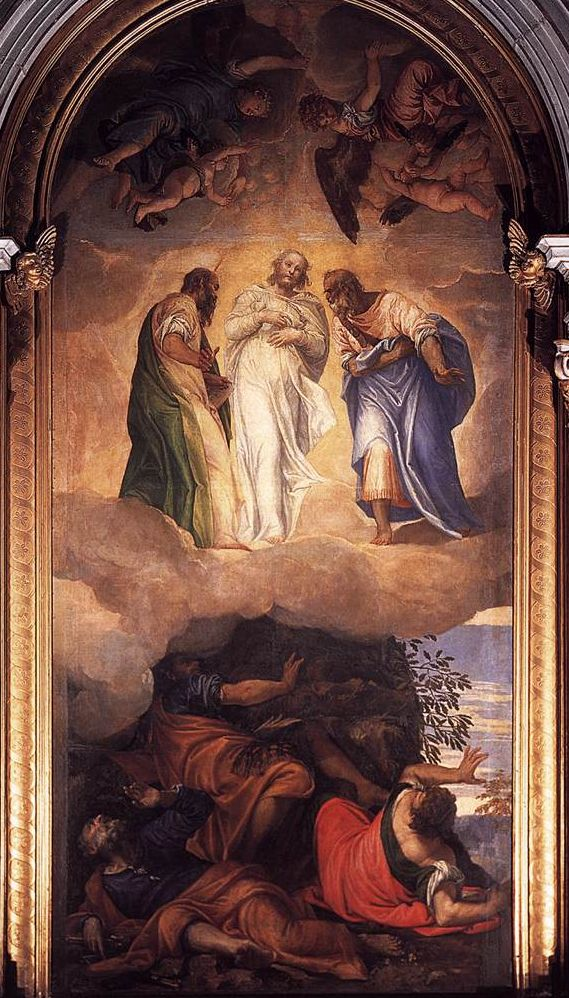
Veronese, "Transfiguration"

Francesco Pisani (1494 – 28 June 1570) was an Italian Cardinal, born in Venice, the son of Alvise Pisani, the noted banker, who was Procurator of S. Mark's, a member of the Council of Ten, and a Councillor of the Doge of Venice; and Cecilia Giustinian. He had a brother named Giovanni (Zuan), who also became Procurator of S. Mark's and was a Venetian diplomat; he was married to the sister of Doge Andrea Gritti. He was a strong supporter of the alliance between Venice, France and the Papacy, called the League of Cognac. He shared the imprisonment of Pope Clement VII in the Castel S. Angelo during the Sack of Rome and its aftermath. He spent eighteen months in exile in Naples while Clement made his peace with the Emperor Charles V.

== Early Benefices ==
Nothing is known about his education.

Francesco had been named a Protonotary Apostolic, the highest grade of monsignor, giving him the rank of a prelate. He was created a cardinal-deacon by Pope Leo X, in the Consistory of 1 July 1517, at the request of Doge Leonardo Loredan, and assigned the Deaconry of S. Teodoro. The red hat is said to have cost his father 20,000 gold ducats and a ruby. The new cardinal was not in Rome at the time, and the red hat was brought to him in Venice; it was presented on Sunday, 23 August 1517. On 27 August 1518, the Venetian Council voted to give possession of the Benedictine abbey of S. Stefano di Spalato, on the death of its abbot, to Cardinal Pisani. Pisani was appointed Bishop of Padua on 8 August 1524.

In 1526, during the invasion of the city of Rome on 20–21 September, led by Cardinal Pompeo Colonna, Pisani sheltered the Venetian Ambassador in the Palazzo Venezia. On 28 September 1526, he was named Administrator of the diocese of Città Nova (Aemonensis, in Istria), which he finally resigned in 1535.

== Sack of Rome ==
On 27 February 1527, Cardinal Pisani was granted the Deaconry of S. Maria in Porticu. He was promoted Cardinal-Deacon of San Marco, the traditional Venetian church in Rome, which is normally the titulus of a cardinal-priest, on 3 May 1527 by Pope Clement VII, just three days before the Sack of Rome began. He kept the Deaconry of S. Maria in Porticu in commendam. Two days later he was finally consecrated bishop.

On the morning of 6 May, as the assault on Rome began, Cardinal Pisani was at the Vatican Palace to participate in the Pope's morning Mass. He was with the Pope to witness the assault, and fled with the Pope through the covered passage to the Castel S. Angelo. He was Pope Clement's fellow prisoner in the Castel S. Angelo during the Sack of Rome in May 1527, and its aftermath. In September 1527, Giovanni (Zuan) Pisani, the brother of Cardinal Francesco, reported to the Signoria of Venice that he had word that the Pope had appointed his brother Archbishop of Vienne, and that the Pope was writing to the King of France for his consent. Pope Clement finally concluded a treaty (i.e. surrendered) to the Spanish at the end of November. At the beginning of December 1527, the two leaders of the French and Venetian factions in the College of Cardinals, Cardinal Pisani and Cardinal Trivulzio, were taken to Gaeta, and from there sent to Naples as hostages for the Pope's good behaviour. It was reported to the Signoria of Venice that, on 2 December 1527 Cardinal Pisani freely renounced the See of Padua in favor of his nephew Alvise di Giovanni Pisani; the Signoria ordered the Rector of Padua to hand over the diocese either to Alvise (Luigi) Pisani or his Procurator. The younger Alviso was only twelve years old, and his uncle the Cardinal continued to administer the diocese until his own death. On 27 January 1528, Cardinal Pisani was appointed Administrator of the diocese of Treviso. Nonetheless, Cardinal Francesco was a hostage for the good behaviour of the Pope, being kept in Naples for eighteen months. Pisani's father, Alvise, was Commissary General of the French-Venetian armies fighting the Spanish in the Kingdom of Naples, where he died of disease in August 1528.

== After the Sack and Prison ==
In 1529 Cardinal Pisani obtained the Deaconry of Sant' Agata in Suburra, probably in commendam, since he continued to style himself Cardinal Deacon of S. Marco. He held the Deaconry until 1545.

On 1 April 1535 Cardinal Francesco Pisano, Cardinal Deacon of S. Marco, who was possessor of the faculty of disposing of certain benefices in the Cathedrals of Padua and Treviso, which had been granted him by Popes Clement VII and Paul III, renounced those privileges in order to conform with the desire of the Signoria of Venice.

In 1550 Cardinal Juan Alvarez de Toledo was promoted from the Deaconry of S. Maria in Porticu to the priestly titulus of S. Sisto. Consequently, the Deaconry of S. Maria in Porticu was given back to Cardinal Pisani in commendam, and he held it until he was promoted to the Cardinal-Bishopric of Albano.

Cardinal Pisani was nominated Administrator of the diocese of Narbonne by King Henri II of France, which was confirmed on 11 May 1551.

== Cardinal Protodeacon ==
On 10 April 1555, as senior Cardinal Deacon, Cardinal Pisani crowned Pope Marcellus II (Cervini). It was Wednesday in Holy Week, and therefore the ceremony was very simple. Cervini had been elected earlier on the same day, and immediately consecrated a bishop in the Cappella Paolina by the Bishop of Ostia, Cardinal Gian Pietro Carafa. Pope Marcellus II died during the night between 30 April and 1 May, after a reign of only twenty-two days.

On 23 May 1555, Cardinal Gian Pietro Carafa was elected pope, and chose the name Paul IV. He was crowned on the steps of the Vatican Basilica on Sunday, 26 May, by Cardinal Francesco Pisani, the prior Diaconum.

== Cardinal Bishop ==
With his election to the Papacy, Cardinal Carafa left the See of Ostia vacant. It was filled by Cardinal Jean du Bellay. Bellay's seat at Porto was then filled by Cardinal Rodolfo Pio de Carpi, Bishop of Tusculum. The then vacant See of Tusculum was taken by Cardinal Juan Álvarez de Toledo, leaving his seat at Albano vacant. Cardinal Pisani was promoted Cardinal-bishop of Albano on 29 May 1555 by Pope Paul IV, then, on the death of Cardinal Alvarez, he was promoted Cardinal-bishop of Frascati (Tusculum) on 20 September 1557. Pius IV promoted him Cardinal-bishop of Porto e Santa Rufina on 18 May 1562 when Rodolfo Pio became Bishop of Ostia, and then Cardinal Pisani himself became Cardinal-bishop of Ostia on 12 May 1564.

Cardinal Francesco Pisani participated as Bishop of Tusculum (Frascati) in the Conclave of 1559, an event that lasted nearly four months. It was notorious for the extreme laxity of security. On 5 December, the traditional rule that went back to Pope Gregory X (1274) was put into effect, limiting the cardinals to one dish at a meal was put into effect. Finally, on Christmas Day, after the French and Spanish factions had both exhausted their resources, Cardinal Giovanni Angelo de' Medici was elected by acclamation, and a formal scrutiny was taken the next day. He chose to be called Pius IV.

On 10 June 1564, Pope Pius IV granted the Serene Republic of Venice the Palazzo of S. Marco in Rome, on the condition that the Cardinal of S. Marco could reside there, and that the transfer was not to take place until after the death of Cardinal Francesco Pisani, Bishop of Ostia, or with his consent.

Cardinal Pisani also took part in the Conclave of 1565-1566, this time as Dean of the Sacred College of Cardinals. He was the senior cardinal present, and the only cardinal who survived from the reign of Leo X. He was considered papabile, but he had no great following. On 7 January 1566, mostly through the work of Cardinals Carlo Borromeo and Alessandro Farnese, the cardinals elected Cardinal Michele Ghislieri, who took the throne name Pius V.

The Cardinal was a patron of the arts. He commissioned a house on the mainland in Montagnana, the Villa Pisani, from Andrea Palladio. He also commissioned an altarpiece for the Cathedral of Montagnana, Santa Maria Assunta, from Paolo Veronese, who was resident in Montagnana in 1555. The subject was the Transfiguration of Christ.

Cardinal Pisani died in Rome, at his palazzo of S. Marco, on 28 June 1570, at the age of seventy-six, having been a cardinal for fifty-three years. He was buried in the Basilica of S. Marco in Rome.

A statue of Cardinal Francesco Pisani, not done from life, is No. 70 in the Prato della Valle in Padua; the statues were carved ca. 1775-1883.

== Bibliography ==
- Marino Sanuto (1895). Federico Stefani & Guglielmo Berchet (ed.). I diarii di Marino Sanuto: (MCCCCXCVI-MDXXXIII) (in Italian). Vol. XLIV. Venezia: F. Visentini.
- Sanuto, Marino (1896). Federico Stefani & Guglielmo Berchet (ed.). I diarii di Marino Sanuto: (MCCCCXCVI-MDXXXIII) (in Italian). Vol. XLV. Venezia: F. Visentini.
- Marino Sanudo (1897). Federico Stefani & Guglielmo Berchet (ed.). I diarii di Marino Sanuto: (MCCCCXCVI-MDXXXIII) (in Italian). Vol. XLVI (September 1527-February 1528). Venezia: F. Visentini.

Catholic Church titles
Preceded by Federico Sanseverino	Cardinal-Deacon of San Teodoro; 1518–1527	Succeeded by Niccolò Gaddi
Preceded by Marco Cornaro	Bishop of Padua; 1524–1527	Succeeded by Luigi Pisani
Preceded by François de Tournon; Administrator	Administrator of Narbonne; 1551–1563	Succeeded by Ippolito II d'Este
Preceded by Juan Álvarez de Toledo	Cardinal-bishop of Albano; 1555–1557	Succeeded by Pedro Pacheco de Villena
Preceded by Juan Álvarez de Toledo	Cardinal-bishop of Frascati; 1557–1562 and 1564–1565	Succeeded by Alessandro Farnese
Preceded by Rodolfo Pio	Cardinal-bishop of Porto; 1562–1564	Succeeded by Federico Cesi
Preceded by Rodolfo Pio	Cardinal-bishop of Ostia; 1564–1570	Succeeded by Giovanni Girolamo Morone
Records
Preceded by Cristoforo Guidalotti Ciocchi del Monte	Oldest living Member of the Sacred College; 27 October 1564 - 28 June 1570	Succeeded by Giovanni Ricci
