= Luigi Pisani =

Catholic cardinal

Cardinal Luigi (Alvise) Pisani
- Cardinal-Priest
- Diocese: Bishop of Padua
- Elected: 2 December 1527
- In office: 3 June 1570

Orders
- Created cardinal: 12 March 1565 by Pope Pius IV
- Rank: Cardinal Priest of San Marco

Personal details
- Born: 1522 Venice
- Died: 3 June 1570 (aged 47–48) Venice IT
- Buried: Santa Maria delle Grazie, Venice
- Parents: Giovanni (Zuan) Pisani, Benedetta Gritti

Luigi Pisani (1522 – 3 June 1570) was an Italian Roman Catholic bishop and cardinal. He was the son of Giovanni Pisani, an Ambassador of Venice to France. His uncle, his mother's brother was the Doge of Venice, and another uncle, his father's brother, was the Bishop of Padua, Cardinal Francesco Pisani. In 1524, Francesco, resigned his position in favour of Luigi but, Luigi being only a toddler, Francesco was appointed Administrator of the diocese that he had formally resigned. In 1555, Luigi succeeded Francesco on the latter's promotion to Bishop of Albano. Pisani rose in the hierarchy of the church, serving as praefectus annonae, dealing with the finances of the provisioning of the Papal Court and the City of Rome from 1561 to 1562. Pope Pius IV made him a cardinal priest in 1565. He participated in the papal conclave of 1565-66 that elected Pope Pius V. He received the red hat and the titular church of San Vitale in 1566. In 1568 he opted for the titular church of San Marco.

== Early life ==
Luigi (Alvise) Pisani was born in Venice in 1522, the son of Giovanni Pisani, future Ambassador of the Republic of Venice to the Kingdom of France (1531), and his wife Benedetta Gritti. His mother was the sister of Andrea Gritti, Doge of Venice, and his father was the brother of Cardinal Francesco Pisani.

=== Bishop of Padua ===
When his uncle, Cardinal Francesco Pisani, who had been Bishop of Padua since 1524, resigned the See on 2 December 1527, he did so in favor of his nephew Luigi. At his tender age, Luigi was too young to be a bishop (the minimum canonical age being twenty-five), and thus the diocese needed an Administrator, who turned out to be his uncle the Cardinal. The Cardinal, therefore, was able to pursue his activities at the Papal Court (which was in exile at the time) and still collect a share of the revenues of the diocese and control over the awarding of benefices. This arrangement continued until 1555.

== Priesthood ==
Pisani succeeded as Administrator of the diocese of Padua in 1555, on the resignation of his uncle, Cardinal Francesco Pisani, who had been promoted Bishop of Albano by the new Pope, Paul IV (Carafa). There is no reference to Luigi's taking holy orders or being consecrated a bishop, but his succession to the Diocese in 1555 may have forced the issue.

In the meantime, he had moved to Rome, becoming a Cleric in the Apostolic Camera. This position was for sale, and he or his family probably purchased the office. He rose in the hierarchy of the Apostolic Chamber to the office of praefectus annonae, ninth in rank, dealing with the finances of the provisioning of the Papal Court and the City of Rome. He held that post from August 1561 until May 1562.

In 1562-63, he was a participant in the Council of Trent, which would imply that he was certainly a bishop by 1562.

Pope Pius IV made him a cardinal priest in his fourth Consistory for the creation of cardinals on 12 March 1565. Pope Pius died on 9 December 1565, before Luigi had been invested with a titular church. He participated in the papal conclave of 1565-66 that elected Pope Pius V. He received the red hat and the titular church of San Vitale on 8 February 1566. On 2 June 1568 he opted for the titular church of San Marco.

On 14 January 1569 he was elected to succeed Cardinal Giacomo Savelli as Chamberlain of the Sacred College of Cardinals. He served the usual one-year term, and was succeeded on 14 January 1570 by Cardinal Philibert Babou de la Bourdaisière. He was never (as some report) Chamberlain of the Holy Roman Church.

== Death ==
He died in Venice on 3 June 1570, at the age of forty-eight, three weeks before his uncle, Cardinal Francesco Pisani. He was buried in the church of Santa Maria delle Grazie in Venice.
