= Abdon and Sennen =

Christian Martyrs

Saints Abdon and Sennen
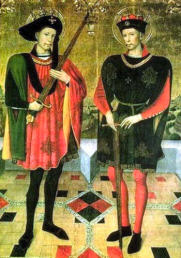
- Saints Abdon and Sennen from a panel painted by Jaume Huguet

Martyrs
- Born: 3rd century Persia (modern-day Iran)
- Died: c. 250; Rome
- Venerated in: Catholic Church; Eastern Orthodoxy; Oriental Orthodoxy; Church of the East; Anglican Communion
- Canonized: Pre-Congregation
- Feast: 30 July
- Attributes: Fur tunics; sword; Phrygian caps; two crowns; in a den of lions and bears
- Patronage: children; invoked for good harvest; burying the dead, coopers, Pescia; Sahagún, León; Calasparra; Sagunto

Abdon and Sennen, variously written in early calendars and martyrologies Abdo, Abdus, and Sennes, Sennis, Zennen, are recognized by the Catholic Church and Eastern Orthodox Church as Christian martyrs, with a feast day on 30 July. In some places they have been honoured on 20 March, and the first Sunday of May.

Nothing is known historically about Abdon and Sennen, and whether they can be verified. The Roman Martyrology indicates that they were martyred for their faith, and suggests they were buried on 30 July in the Cemetery of Pontianus on the Via Portuensis, outside Rome. Their names were subsequently removed in the twentieth century from the list in the General Roman Calendar, which is commemorated liturgically worldwide, but they may still be celebrated everywhere on their feast day unless in some locality an obligatory celebration is assigned to that day. The rank of their celebration was given as "Simple" in the Tridentine calendar and remained such until the classification was changed to that of "Commemoration" in the General Roman Calendar of 1960.

== Veneration ==
Their Acts, written for the most part prior to the 9th century, describe them as Persian nobles, captured and taken to Rome during a military campaign in the third century. There they became slaves, converted to Christianity and helped bury the Christian dead. They came to the attention of Emperor Decius who had them taken in chains before the Roman Senate, where they refused to sacrifice to the Roman gods, and so were dismembered by gladiators in the Colosseum approximately in the year 250. The Acts certainly contain several fictitious statements about the cause, the circumstances of their coming to Rome and the nature of their torments. They relate that their bodies were buried by a subdeacon, "Quirinus", and later transferred in the reign of Constantine the Great (reigned 306–337) to the Cemetery of Pontianus on the road to Porto, near the gates of Rome.

A fresco found on a sixth century sarcophagus supposed to contain their remains represents them receiving crowns from Christ. Several cities, notably Florence and Soissons, claim possession of their bodies, but the Acta Sanctorum insist that they rest in the Basilica of San Marco Evangelista al Campidoglio, Rome, having been brought there in 1474. They may have even had their own church in Rome, which has now been lost. The Benedictine Abbey of Sainte-Marie in Arles-sur-Tech, France also claims their tomb.

Among other cities, Abdon and Sennen are patron saints of Calasparra, in Murcia, Spain, in which the feasts days celebrated in their honor date back to the 16th century. In Catalonia, they are known as Sant Nin i Sant Non, and in Valencia as Sants de la Pedra, meaning “saints of hail”, from the belief that these saints offer protection to orchards and fruit trees against hail damage.

== List of churches dedicated to these saints ==
- France
  - église de Saint-Abdon et Saint-Sennen, Mazères, Ariège
  - église Saint-Abdon-et-Saint-Sennen, Labéjan, Gers
  - église Saint-Abdon-et-Saint-Sennen, Larroque-Engalin, Gers
  - église de Puycasquier, Puycasquier, Gers
  - église Saint-Abdon-et-Saint-Sennen, Corbarieu, Tarn-et-Garonne
  - église Saint-Abdon-et-Sennen, Drudas, Haute-Garonne
  - église Saint-Abdon-et-Saint-Sennen, Saint-Senoux, Ille-et-Vilaine
  - église Saints-Abdon-et-Sennen, Messac, Ille-et-Vilaine
  - église Saints-Abdon-et-Sennen, Peyraube, Hautes-Pyrénées
  - église Saint-Blaise-et-Saint-Abdon, Tronsanges, Nièvre
  - église Saint-Abdon-et-Saint-Sennen, Golbey, Vosges
  - chapelle du hameau de Cenat, Saint-Didier-sur-Doulon, Haute-Loire
  - chapelle Saint-Abdon, Arnay-sous-Vitteaux, Côte-d'Or
  - chapelle Saint-Abdon-et-Saint-Sennen, La Châtre, Indre
  - chapelle Saint-Abdon, Gournay, Indre
  - église de l'Assomption-de-la-Très-Sainte-Vierge, Bellac, Haute-Vienne
  - église Saint-Abdon-et-Saint-Sennen, Combejean, Pierrerue, Hérault
  - église Saint-Abdon-et-Saint-Sennen, Thillot, Meuse
  - chapelle Saint-Abdon-et-Saint-Sennen, Montbard, Ardèche
  - église de Dandesigny, Verrue, Vienne
- Germany
  - St. Abdon und Sennen, Salzgitter-Ringelheim, Lower Saxony
- Slovakia
  - Kostol sv. Abdona a Senena, Gemerský Jablonec
- Spain
  - ermita dels Sants de la Pedra, Cullera, Valencian Community.
  - ermita dels Sants de la Pedra, Sueca, Valencia.

St. Sennen's Church in Sennen, Cornwall is in fact dedicated to Saint Sinninus (also known as Saint Senan), a sixth-century Irish bishop.
