= Pietro Peregrosso =

Pietro Peregrosso (born in Milan, ca. 1225; died in Anagni, or Rome, 1 August 1295) was a Roman Catholic legal scholar, ecclesiastical bureaucrat, and Cardinal (1288–1295). He had a sister, who was a nun at the convent of S. Agnete de Archagniago at the Porta Vercellina in Milan. He had a nephew, Belviso de Perego, to whom he left a legacy.

He studied at the University of Bologna and at the University of Orleans, ultimately receiving the laurels in utroque iure (both Canon Law and Civil Law).

== Offices ==
Pietro Peregrosso was Treasurer of the Church of Laon and of the Church of Cambrai, and he was a Canon of Chambéry and Canon of the Cathedral of Paris. All of these appointments were sources of income, not offices which required one to care for souls of Christians.

He was Vice-Chancellor of the Holy Roman Church under Popes Innocent V, Adrian V, John XXI, Nicholas III, Martin IV, Honorius IV and Nicholas IV (i.e. from 1276 to 1288). This office made him the effective head of the papal Secretariat in the Roman Curia. In the earliest surviving papal bull which he supervised, he signs as Magister Petrus de Mediolano. He was commended by King Edward I of England for being especially attentive to expediting the King's business in the Roman Curia.

In 1279, as Pope Nicholas III was preparing his bull on the regulation of the Constitution of the Ordo Minorum (Franciscans), he appointed an editorial committee to give the document its final form. Members of the committee were: Petrus Peregrosso, the Vice-Chancellor; Comes Giusiano de Casate, the Auditor of the Apostolic Palace; the Curial Advocate Angelo; and Benedetto Caetani, the protonotary. The results of their work was embodied in the Liber Sextus of the Code of Canon Law.

== Cardinalate ==
Magister Petrus was created a Cardinal Deacon by Pope Nicholas IV (Hieronymus Maschi) on 16 May 1288, along with five others, and was assigned the Deaconry of San Giorgio in Velabro (velum aureum). A few months later, certainly before February 13, 1289, he was appointed Cardinal Priest and assigned the titular church of S. Marco. In 1288 he was named the Protector of the Order of the Humiliati in Milan, and he may have been the person responsible for their decision to adopt the Roman rite in place of the Ambrosian rite in their liturgical ceremonies.

Cardinal Pietro took part in the Conclave which followed the death of Pope Nicholas IV, which led ultimately to the election of Pope Celestine V. He signed the Electoral Decree of 5 July 1294. He was not present five months later on 13 December, however, when Pope Celestine resigned the Papacy.

In the last year(s) of his life, apparently, Cardinal Pietro was Chamberlain of the College of Cardinals. On 25 November 1295, nearly four months after his death, the Cardinal's estate received a distribution from the Chamber of the College of Cardinals of 11 gold florins, 12 solidi, and 2 denarii from the contribution which had been made by the Abbot of S. Giorgio in Venice and was finally paid by his bankers.

== Death ==
Cardinal Pietro's last known signature on a papal bull was on 21 June 1295, but he was too ill to attend personally and had his signature appended by proxy. He wrote his Testament at Anagni on 14 and 15 July 1295. He died on 1 August 1295, probably at Anagni, where the Papal Curia was resident from 13 June to 1 October. In accordance with one option among his testamentary wishes, he was buried in the Franciscan church of S. Maria in Aracoeli in Rome. One of the beneficiaries of his Testament was the Franciscan convent at Pozzolo in Milan, of which he was the founder. He also left 200 florins to be distributed to his poor relatives at Pozzolo.

== Bibliography ==
- A. Mercati, "I codici di Cristoforo Tolomei priore de Salteano in pegno presso il Cardenale Pietro Peregrosso (1295)," Bulletino Senese di Storia Patria n.s. 5 (1934) pp. 13–27.
- Agostino Paravicini-Bagliani, "Le biblioteche del cardinali Pietro Peregrosso (d. 1295) e Pietro Colonna (d. 1326)," Revue d'histoire ecclesiastigue suisse 64 (1970) 104–139.
- Maria Pia Alberzoni and Claudio M. Tartari, Il Cardinale Pietro Peregrosso e la Fondazione Francescana di Pozzuolo Martesana: (1295 - 1995) (Pozzuolo Martesana (Milano) 1996).
- C. Tangari, "Profilo biografico di Pietro Peregrosso," in Il cardinale Pietro Peregrosso e la fondazione francescana di Pozzuolo Martesana (1295- 1995) (ed. Claudio M. Tartari) (Pozzuolo Martesana 1996), pp. 41–60.
- C. Tangari, "Pietro Peregrosso cardinale protettore degli Umiliati," in Il cardinale Pietro Peregrosso e la fondazione francescana di Pozzuolo Martesana (1295- 1995) (ed. C.M. Tartari) (Pozzuolo Martesana 1996), pp. 147–161.
- Annamaria Ambrosioni, Milano, papato e impero in età medievale: raccolta di studi (Milano: Vita e Pensiero, 2003).
- Giancarlo Andenna, "Peregrosso, Pietro," Dizionario Biografico degli Italiani Volume 82 (2015).
