= San Marco Evangelista al Campidoglio, Rome =

Latin Catholic basilica, a landmark of Rome, Italy

San Marco Evangelista Basilica
- Basilica di San Marco Evangelista al Campidoglio (Italian)
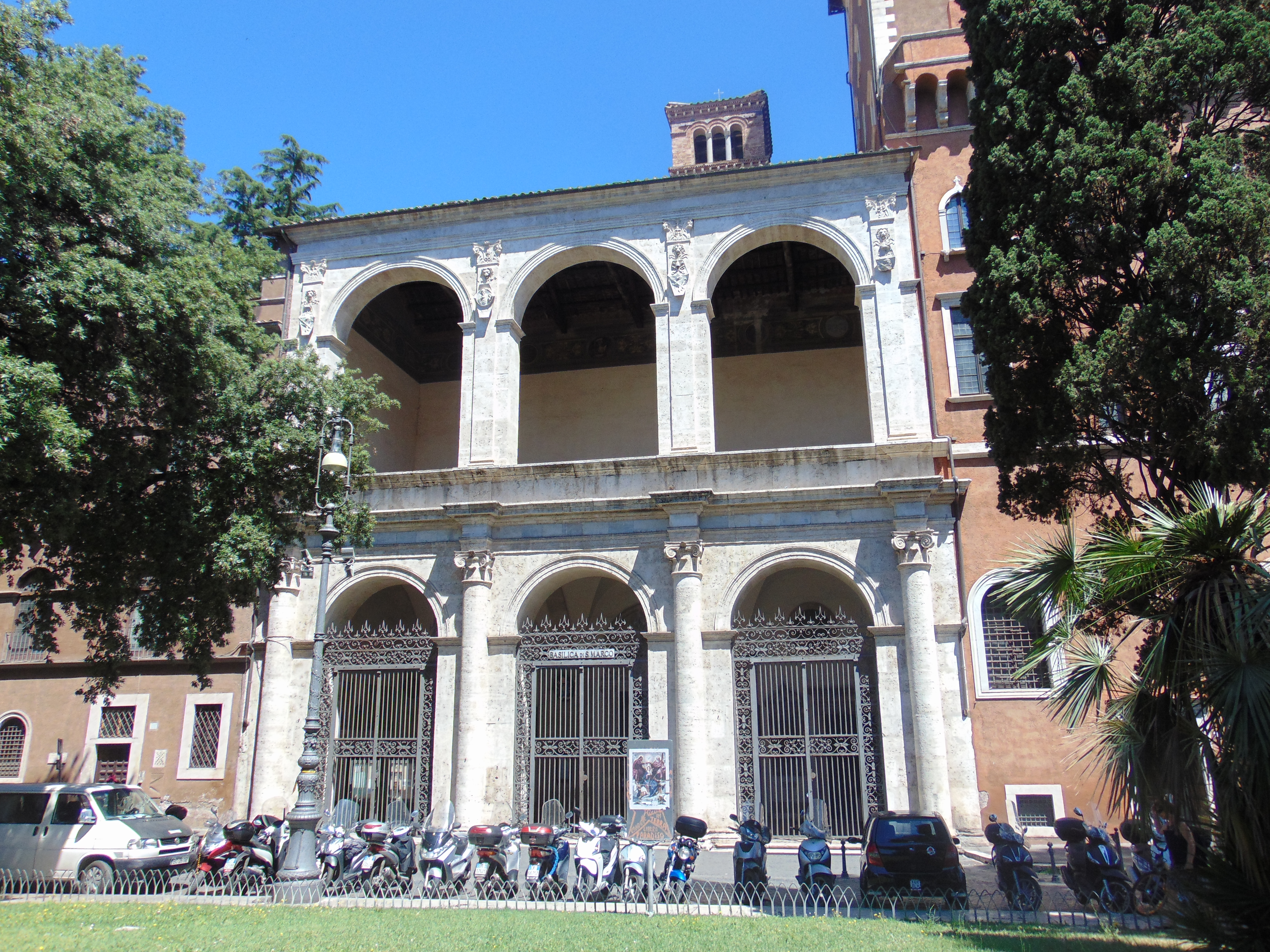
- South façade of the basilica. To the right, Palazzo Venezia, the former embassy of the Republic of Venice, whose protector was St. Mark.
- Click on the map for a fullscreen view
- 41°53′44.6″N 12°28′53.2″E
- Location: Piazza di S. Marco 48, Rome, Italy
- Denomination: Latin Catholic
- Website: www.sanmarcoevangelista.it

History
- Dedication: Mark the Evangelist
- Consecrated: AD 324

San Marco is a titular basilica in Rome dedicated to Saint Mark the Evangelist, located in the small Piazza di San Marco adjoining Piazza Venezia. It was first consecrated in 336 by Pope Mark and rebuilt in its present form in 833 by Pope Gregory IV. Today, the basilica is the national church of Venice in Rome.

== History ==
=== Earlier buildings ===
According to the Liber pontificalis, Pope Mark established a basilica in a place called ad Pallacinas in 336. This first church was built atop preexisting, pre-Constantinian structures of unknown date or function, but excavations in the mid-20th century revealed a surviving ancient Roman mosaic with acanthus vine-scroll ornamentation underneath the present-day basilica's right aisle. Pope Mark's first church incorporated walls from this earlier structure, and featured a new colonnade, opus sectile pavements, and frescoed walls, of which a small fragment depicting several horses survives underneath the present-day basilica. The synod of Pope Symmachus in 499 records the church as Titulus Marci. It is likely that the previous ancient Roman structure was initially a residence owned by Pope Mark, who then gifted the property to a Christian congregation within the first few months of his papacy. Archaeological excavations further revealed burned marble and ash deposits on the pavement, which provide evidence that the first church was likely destroyed in a fire.

A second church was built possibly in the second half of the 6th century, but the lack of archaeological evidence and written records make it difficult to properly date. The floor was placed one meter above the first church's floor, possibly to protect the structure against flooding, which was common in medieval Rome. This second church followed the first church's floor plan, only with the addition of a chancel enclosure that divided the nave and provided space for the Schola Cantorum. The Liber pontificalis notes that Pope Adrian I made repairs to the second church's roof and aisles, and provided the basilica with altar cloths, curtains, and seven gold chalices.

=== Present-day basilica ===
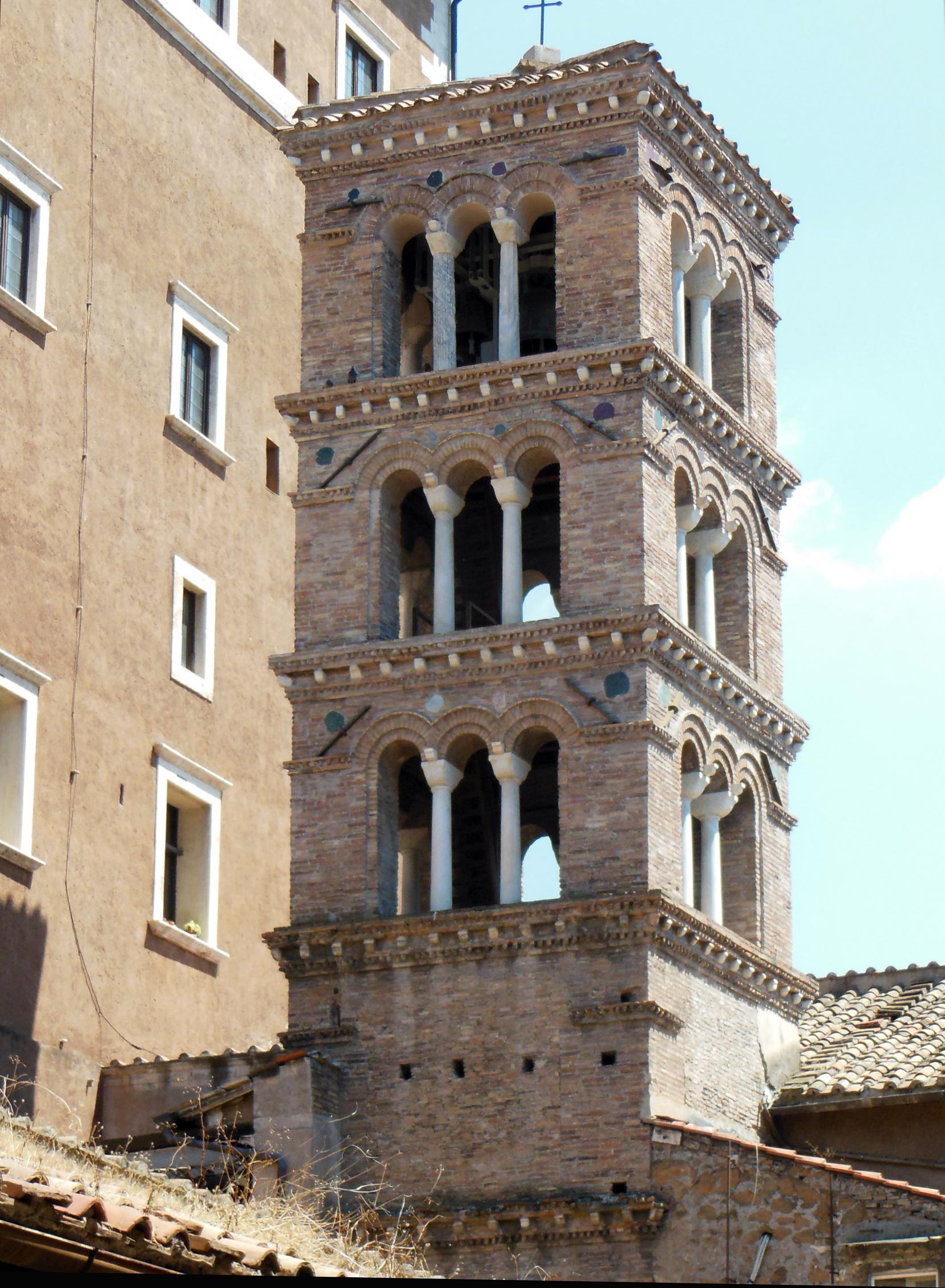
Rome, San Marco. Campanile.

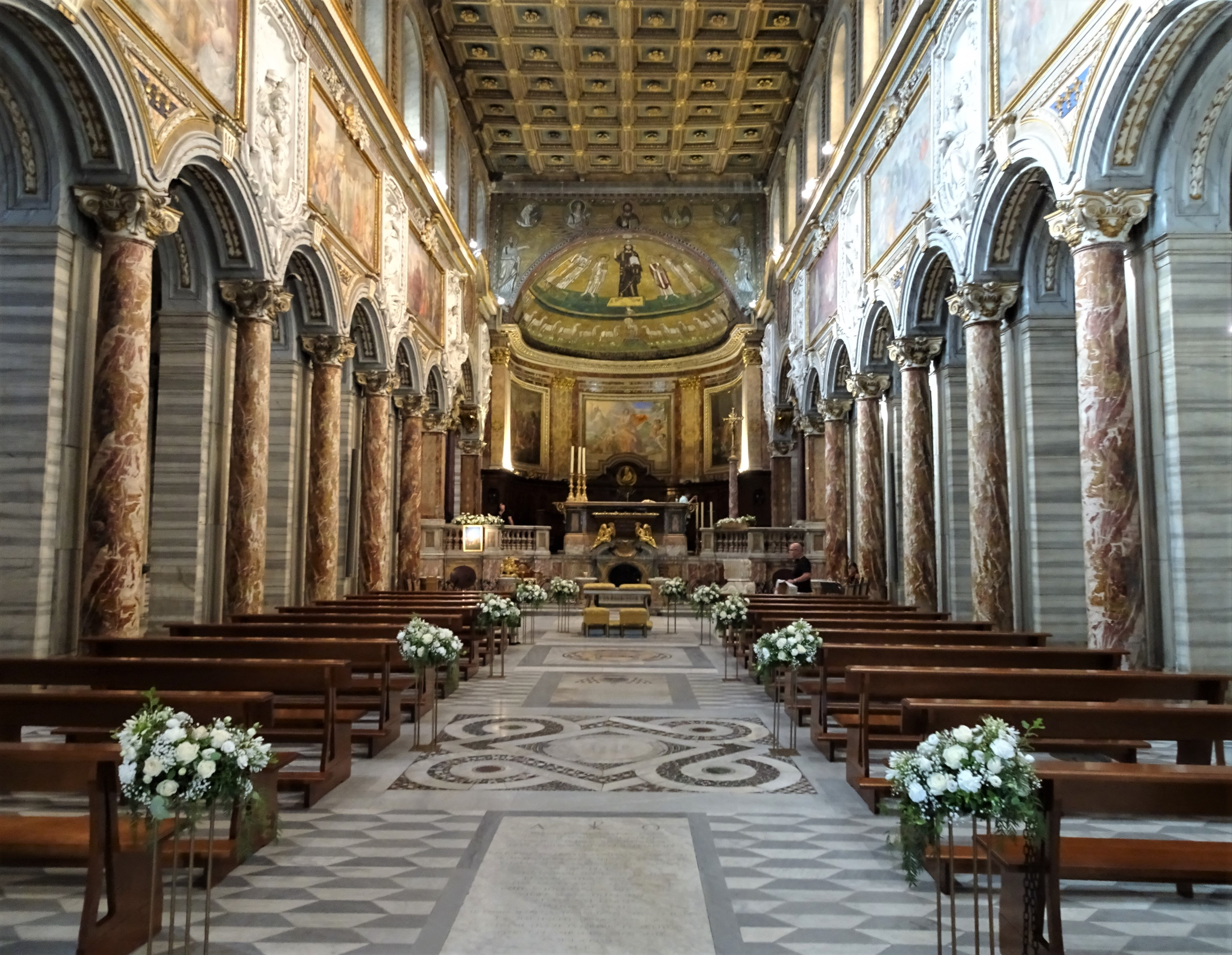
Rome, San Marco. Interior.

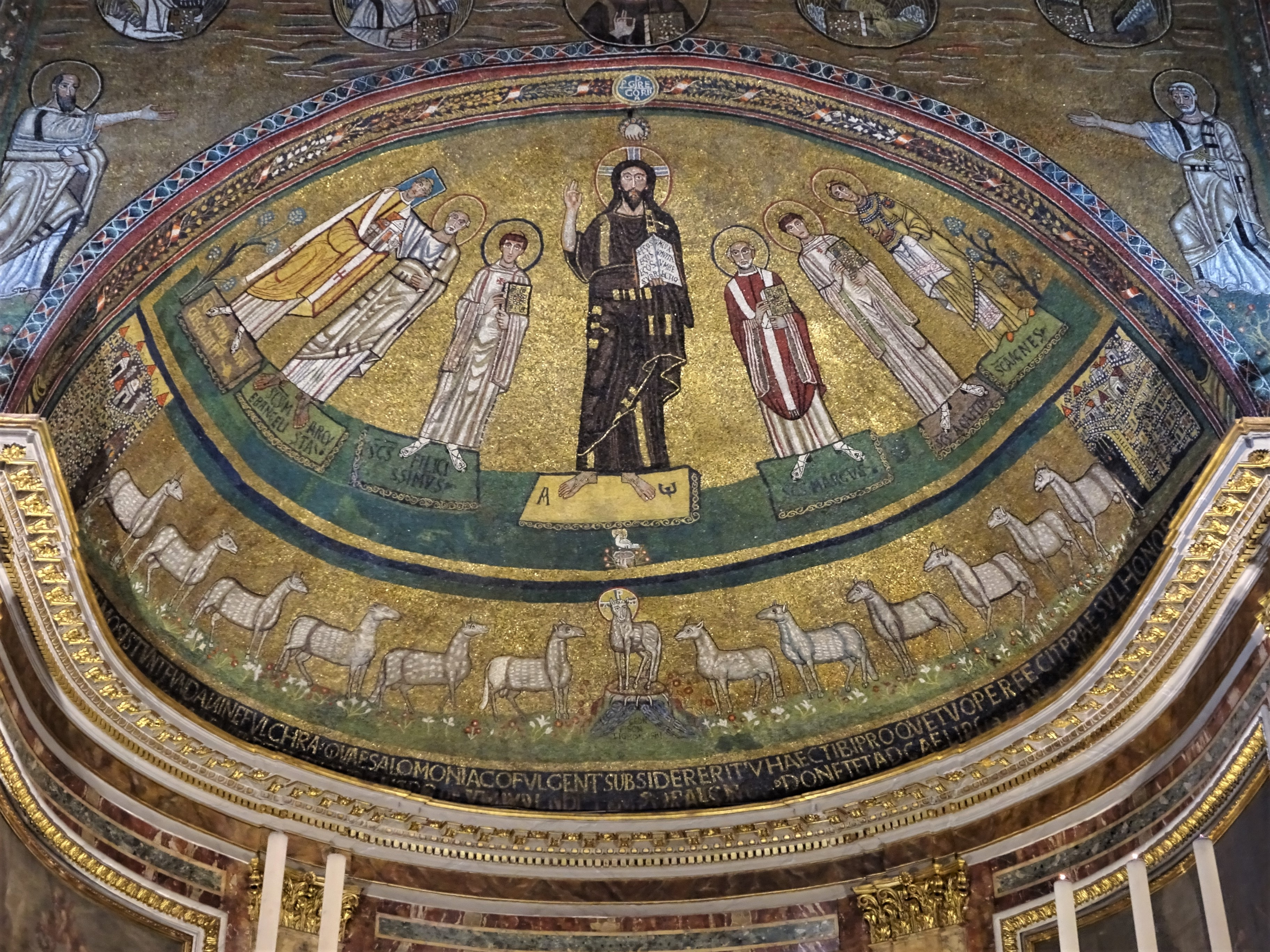
Rome, San Marco. Apse and arch mosaics.

According to the Liber pontificalis, Pope Gregory IV saw the ruinous state of the second church and decided to have it demolished in 833 to rebuild the basilica now seen today. The new church's floorplan also aligns with the prior churches, with two aisles flanking a nave that terminates in an apse. The floor consists of large blocks of tufa that were likely part of the Servian walls. Gregory IV's unique contributions to this rebuilding was the monumental apse mosaic, the annular crypt, and the clerestory.

The apse mosaic is the best surviving element of the Gregory IV's resconstruction in 833. It depicts Jesus in the center with Pope Mark, St. Agapetus, and St. Agnes to his left and St. Feliccissimus, Gregory IV, and St. Mark the Evangelist to his right. All seven figures stand against a solid golden backdrop standing atop pedestals with inscriptions identifying the figures. Below the figures, twelve lambs representing the Twelve Tribes of Israel, lead out of Bethlehem and Jerusalem and surround the Lamb of God. On the apsidal arch, St. Peter and St. Paul stand beneath the roundels of Christ and the Four Evangelists.

The Latin dedicatory inscription running along the bottom of the apse mosaic reads:

VASTA THOLI FIRMO SISTVNT FVNDAMINE FVLCHRA / QVAE SALOMONIACO FVLGENT SVB SIDERE RITV / HAEC TIBI PROQVE TVO PERFECIT PRAESVL HONORE / GREGORIS MARCE EXIMIO CVI NOMINE QUARTVS / TV QVOQVE POSCE DEVM VIVENDI TEMPORA LONGA DONET / ET AD CAELI POST FVNVS SIDERA DVCAT.

English translation:

The huge supports of the apse, which shine like Solomon's temple beneath the stars, rests on a solid foundation. These things, O Mark, the pope with the distinguished name of Gregory IV has made for you and in your own honor. And you pray that God may grant him a long life on earth and after death lead him to the stars of heaven.

The choice to position Mark the Evangelist in the composition in the place traditionally reserved for St. Peter appears to be an intentional subversion of established apse mosaics depicting groups of saints with the donor pope. Art historian Claudia Bolgia suggests that the translation of Mark's relics from Alexandria to St. Mark's Basilica in Venice in 830–31 had an influence on Pope Gregory IV's decision to depict himself in relationship to this particular evangelist. Furthermore, the inclusion of Sts. Agapetus and Feliccissimus may refer to Gregory IV having recently sent their relics to a Bavarian monastery. Therefore, the apse mosaic evokes the spiritual presence of these saints, despite their relics physically existing outside of Rome and, therefore, the immediate jurisdiction of the Holy See. While papal self-representation in apse mosaics was fairly common in the ninth century (i.e. Pope Paschal I in Santa Prassede and Santa Cecilia in Trastevere), Pope Gregory IV's inclusion in at San Marco speaks to his desire to establish papal authority in the city.

Further changes were made to the church throughout the 12th century, with the addition of a Romanesque campanile above the southern end of the nave, sculptural work around the main southern portal, and a new ciborium above the high altar. From 1465–70, Pope Paul II renovated the church's façade according to the Renaissance taste, with a two-storied portico and loggia, using marbles taken from the Colosseum and the Theater of Marcellus. It was at this time that the church was incorporated into the Palazzo Venezia complex, and the clerestory windows were enlarged and ornamented with Gothic tracery, a common feature of Quattrocento Roman architecture. Inside, the wooden ceiling with the emblem of Pope Paul II is one of only two original 15th-century wooden ceilings that can be seen in Rome today (the other being the ceiling at Santa Maria Maggiore). In 1564, Pope Pius IV gave the Republic of Venice control over most of Palazzo Venezia to use as its embassy, thereby making the basilica the national Venetian church in Rome. During the early modern period, the church's interior underwent two major redecoration campaigns in the Baroque style. From 1654–57, Niccolò Sagredo commissioned Orazio Torriani to redecorate the colonnade with regularized Ionic capitals and white-washed shafts. Then, from 1732–54, Cardinal Angelo Maria Quirini commissioned Filippo Barigioni to redesign the high altar and choir stalls. Paintings and sculptures by Baroque and Neoclassical artists, such as Pier Francesco Mola, Guillame Courtois, Palma il Giovane, Luigi Primo, Carlo Maratta, Cosimo Fancelli, and Antonio Canova can be found in throughout the nave of the present-day church.

In 1843, Gregory IV's annular crypt, which had been closed in 1474 under Cardinal Marco Barbo, was rediscovered. Excavations in 1947–50 revealed the foundations and remnants of the earlier churchs, as well as a large cypress chest in the crypt that contained the relics of Pope Mark, St. Abdon and St. Sennen.

== Cardinal priests ==
The following is a list of the past cardinal priests of San Marco, Rome:

Image	Name	Dates	Notes
	Gregorio	797–20 December 827	Elected Pope Gregory IV
	Adriano	842–13 November 867	Elected Pope Adrian II
	Guido di Castello	December 1113–26 September 1143	Elected Pope Celestine II
	John of Anagni	1168–1190	
	Rolando Bandinelli	1151–7 September 1159	Elected Pope Alexander III
	Goffredo Castiglione	18 September 1227–1239	Appointed Bishop of Sabina, later elected Pope Celestine IV
	Pietro Peregrosso	1289–1 August 1295	Died
	Giovanni Gaetano Orsini	16 September 1317–27 August 1335	Died
	Bertrand de Déaulx	18 December 1338 – 4 November 1348	Appointed Bishop of Sabina
	Francesco degli Atti	23 December 1356–25 August 1361	Died
	Jean de Blauzac (Blandiac)	17 September 1361–1372	Appointed Bishop of Sabina
	Pierre Amiel de Sarcenas	18 December 1379–10 August 1389	Died
	Giovanni Fieschi	1390–December 1381	Died
	Ludovicio Donato	1382–1385	Died
	Angelo Correr (Corrario)	12 June 1405–30 November 1406	Elected Pope Gregory XII
	Antonio Calvi	2 July 1409–2 October 1411	Died
	Guillaume Fillastre	6 June 1411–6 November 1428	Died
	Angelotto Fosco	19 September 1431–6 November 1428	Died
	Pietro Barbo	16 June 1451–30 August 1464	Elected Pope Paul II
	Marco Barbo	2 October 1467–2 March 1491	Died
	Lorenzo Cibo de Mari	14 March 1491–21 December 1503	Died
	Domenico Grimani	25 December 1503–27 August 1523	Died
	Marco Cornaro	14 December 1523–20 May 1524	Appointed Bishop of Albano
	Francesco Pisani	3 May 1527–21 June 1564	Resigned
	Luigi Cornaro	21 June 1564–2 June 1568	Opted for the titulus of S. Vitale
	Luigi Pisani	2 June 1568–3 June 1570	Died
	Luigi Cornaro (second term)	9 June 1570–10 May 1584	Died
	Giovanni Francesco Commendone	14 May 1584–26 December 1584	Died
	Agostino Valier	14 January 1585–1 June 1605	Appointed Bishop of Palestrina
	Giovanni Delfino	1 June 1605–23 June 1621	Translated to San Girolomo dei Croati
	Matteo Pruilli	23 June 1621–13 March 1624	Died
	Pietro Valier	18 March 1624–9 April 1629	Died
	Federico Cornaro	26 April 1629–19 November 1646	Translated to Santa Maria in Trastevere
	Marcantonio Bragadin	19 November 1646–28 March 1658	Died
	Cristoforo Vidman	1 April 1658–30 September 1660	Died
	Pietro Ottoboni	15 November 1660–13 September 1660	Translated to Santa Maria in Trastevere
	Gregorio Barbarigo	13 September 1677–18 June 1697	Died
	Marcantonio Barbarigo	1 July 1697–26 May 1706	Died
	Giambattista Rubini	25 June 1706–17 February 1707	Died
	Giovanni Alberto Badoer	11 July 1712–14 May 1714	Died
	Luigi Priuli	28 May 1714–15 March 1720	Died
	Pietro Priuli	6 May 1720–22 January 1728	Died
	Angelo Maria Quirini	8 March 1728–6 January 1755	Died
	Carlo della Torre Rezzonico	17 February 1755–6 July 1758	Elected Pope Clement XIII
	Antonio Maria Pruili	19 April 1762–26 October 1772	Died
	Carlo Rezzonico	14 December 1772–26 January 1799	Died
	Ludovico Flangini Giovanelli	2 April 1800–24 May 1802	Translated to S. Anastasia
	Luigi Ercolani	22 July 1816–10 December 1825	Died
	Karl Kajetan von Gaisruck	21 May 1829–19 November 1846	Died
	Charles Januarius Acton		Died
	Giacomo Piccolomini	4 October 1847–17 August 1861	Died
	Pietro de Silvestri	27 September 1861–19 November 1875	Died
	Domenico Bartolini	3 April 1876–2 October 1887	Died
	Michelangelo Celesia	25 November 1887–14 April 1904	Died
	József Samassa	11 December 1905–20 August 1912	Died
	Franz Xavier Nagl	2 December 1912–4 February 1913	Died
	Friedrich Piffl	25 May 1914–12 April 1932	Died
	Elia Dalla Costa	13 March 1933–22 December 1961	Died
	Giovanni Urbani	19 March 1962–17 September 1969	Died
	Albino Luciani	5 March 1973 – 26 August 1978	Elected Pope John Paul I
	Marco Cé	30 June 1979–12 May 2014	Died
	Angelo De Donatis	28 June 2018–today	Current cardinal priest

== See also ==
- Churches of Rome
- St. Mark's Basilica, Venice

Preceded by Santa Maria Ausiliatrice, Rome	Landmarks of Rome; San Marco Evangelista al Campidoglio, Rome	Succeeded by Santa Maria degli Angeli e dei Martiri
