= Marigny-le-Cahouët =

- Commune
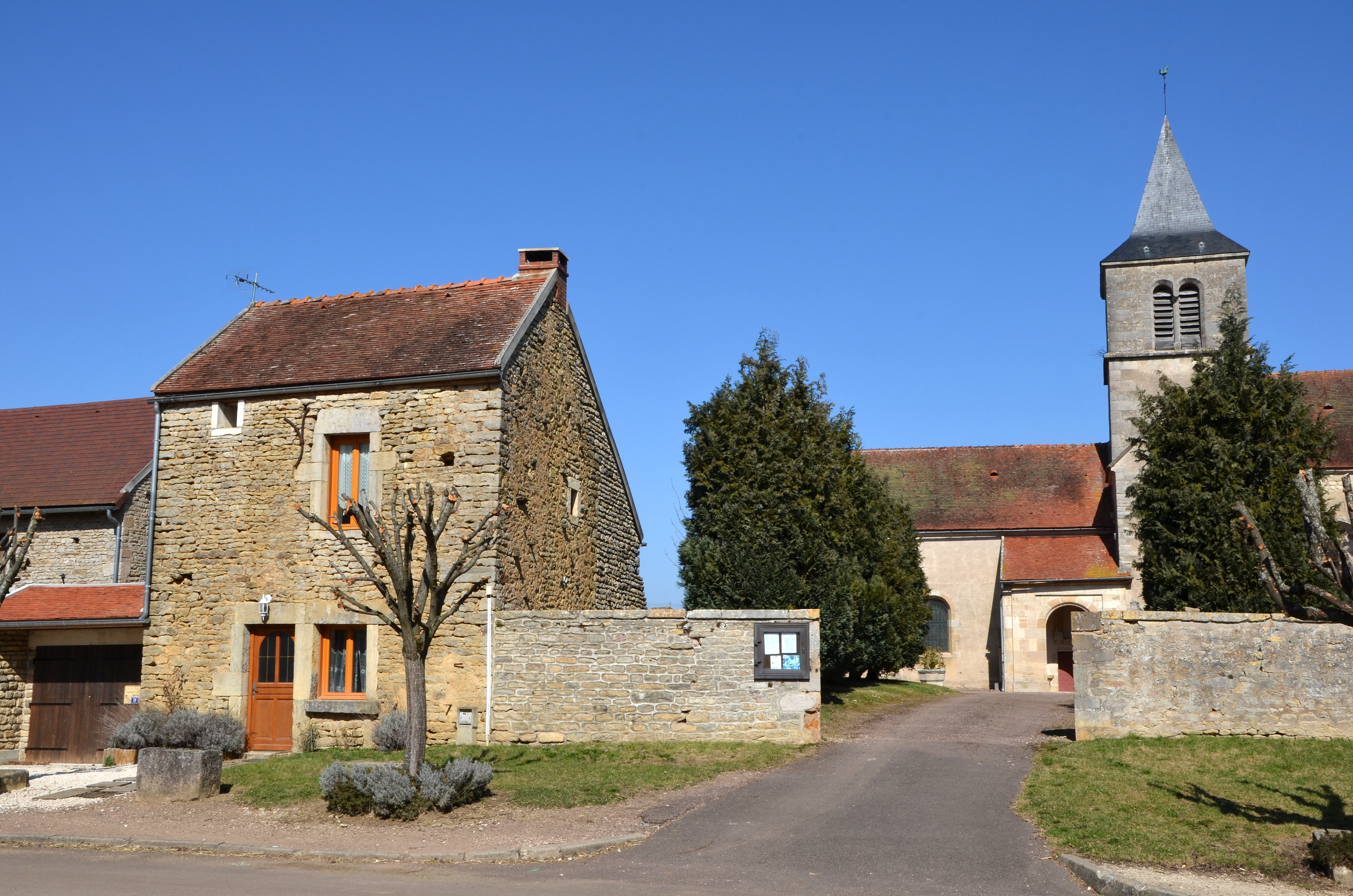
- The church in Marigny-le-Cahouët
- Location of Marigny-le-Cahouët
- Location within France Location within Bourgogne-Franche-Comté
- Coordinates: 47°27′53″N 4°27′39″E
- Country: France
- Region: Bourgogne-Franche-Comté
- Department: Côte-d'Or
- Arrondissement: Montbard
- Canton: Montbard

Government
  - Mayor (2020–2026): Eric Skladana
- Area^{1}: 19.28 km^{2} (7.44 sq mi)
- Highest elevation: 476 m (1,562 ft)
- Lowest elevation: 283 m (928 ft)
- Population (2023): 305
  - Density: 15.8/km^{2} (41.0/sq mi)
- Time zone: UTC+01:00 (CET)
  - Summer (DST): UTC+02:00 (CEST)
- INSEE/Postal code: 21386 /21150
- ^{1} French Land Register data, which excludes lakes, ponds, glaciers > 1 km^{2} (0.386 sq mi or 247 acres) and river estuaries.

Marigny-le-Cahouët (French pronunciation: [maʁiɲi lə kawɛ]) is a commune in the Côte-d'Or department in eastern France.

== Population ==
Historical population
Year	Pop.	±% p.a.
1968	388	—
1975	344	−1.70%
1982	297	−2.08%
1990	290	−0.30%
1999	288	−0.08%
2007	264	−1.08%
2012	307	+3.06%
2017	319	+0.77%
2023	305	−0.75%
Source: INSEE

== See also ==
- Communes of the Côte-d'Or department
