= Felicissimus and Agapitus =

3rd century Christian martyrs

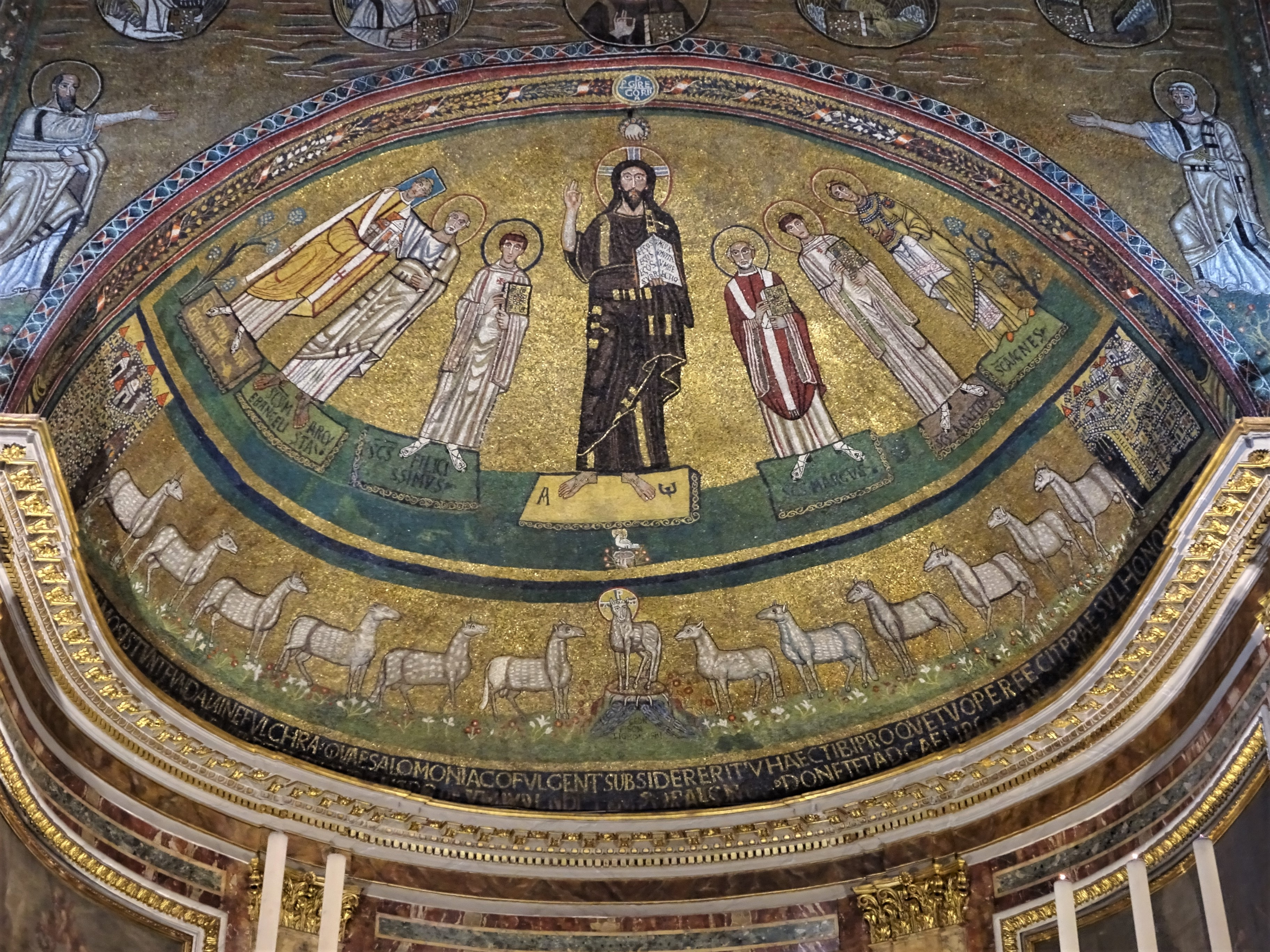
- Died: Catacombs of Praetextatus
- Honored in: Apostolic Catholic Church, Roman Catholic Church
- Feast: August 6

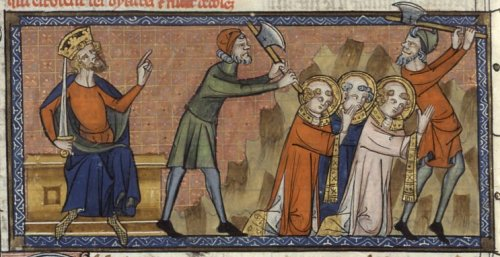
The martyrdom of Saint Sixtus II and his deacons. (Martyre de saint Sixte II et de ses diacres. Cote: Français 185, Fol. 96v . Vies de saints, France, Paris)

Felicissimus and Agapitus were two of the six deacons of Pope Sixtus II who were martyred with him on or about 6 August 258, Felicissimus and Agapitus on the same day as the Pope. The seventh deacon, Lawrence of Rome, was martyred on 10 August of the same year.

Felicissimus and Agapitus are venerated particularly at the Catacombs of Praetextatus on the Via Appia, where they were buried.

In 833 pope Gregory IV created huge mosaic in San Marco Evangelista al Campidoglio, Rome with figures of several saints including both saints. The inclusion of Sts. Agapetus and Feliccissimus may refer to Gregory IV having recently sent their relics to a Bavarian monastery. Therefore, the apse mosaic evokes the spiritual presence of these saints, despite their relics physically existing outside of Rome and, therefore, the immediate jurisdiction of the Holy See.

The Tridentine calendar commemorated Sixtus, Felicissimus, and Agapitus on the feast of the Transfiguration of the Lord, 6 August. They remained in that position in the General Roman Calendar until 1969, when, with the abolition of commemorations, the memorial of Pope Sixtus "and his companions" was moved to 7 August, the day immediately after that of their death.
