= Manifestis Probatum =

1179 founding document of Portugal

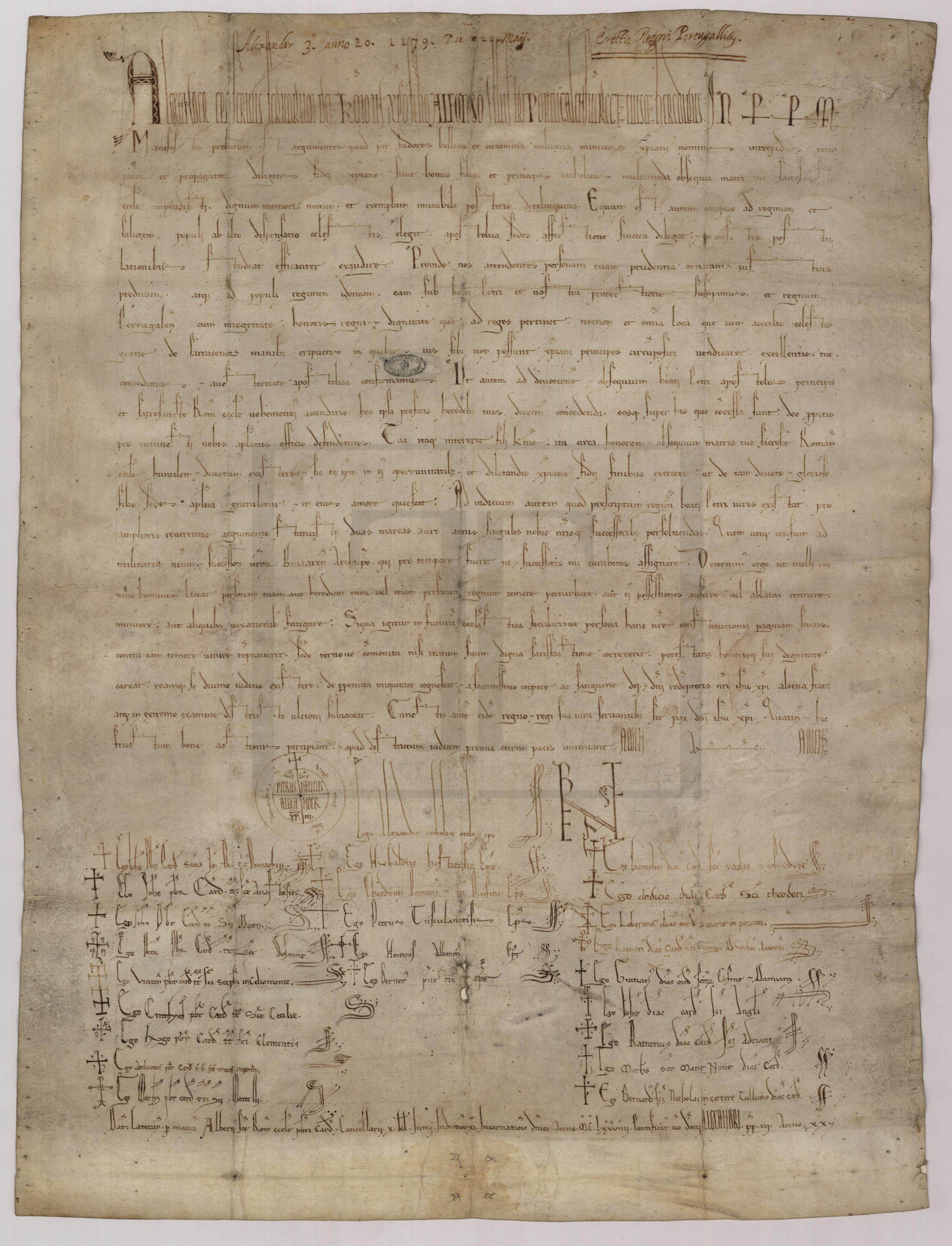
The papal bull Manifestis Probatum, now at the Torre do Tombo National Archive in Lisbon

Manifestis Probatum (Latin for 'Manifestly Proven') is a great papal bull and the founding document of Portugal. Promulgated on 23 May 1179 by Pope Alexander III, the bull officially recognized the independence of Portugal from the Kingdom of León by confirming the Kingdom of Portugal to the now-recognized king Afonso Henriques and his successors. The bull is, therefore, the single most important written document from Portugal's independence process.

The Papacy did not recognize the legitimacy of Afonso's adoption of the royal title in 1139, and continued to regard him as a vassal of León. On 13 December 1143, Afonso wrote Pope Innocent II the letter Claves Regni (Latin for 'Keys of the Kingdom'), declaring his decision to enfeoff Portugal to the Holy See and asking for protection against any interference in Portugal's territory. (Note: Knowing that to St. Peter were given by Our Lord Jesus Christ the keys to the kingdom of Heaven, I have decided to take that same Apostle as my Patron and advocate, so that in the difficulties of the present life I may experience his help and counsel, and through his merits may attain the rewards of eternal blessedness. Therefore, I, Afonso, by the grace of God King of Portugal, have rendered homage to the Pope, my Lord and Father, into the hands of the Cardinal Deacon Dom Guido, Legate of the Apostolic See. I hereby constitute my land as a censual (feudal tribute) of St. Peter and of the Holy Church of Rome, with an annual tribute of four ounces of gold, and I decree that all those who, after my death, come to possess this land, shall annually pay the same tribute to St. Peter. As a true soldier of St. Peter and of the Roman Pontiff, I ought to have for myself and for my land—and in all that pertains to its dignity and honor—the defense and aid of the Apostolic See. And I shall never be obliged to admit into it the power or lordship of any ecclesiastical or secular authority, save that of the Holy See and its legates. This letter of oblation and affirmation was drawn up on the Ides of December in the year 1181 of the Spanish Era [13 December 1143 AD]. I, Afonso, King of the Portuguese, who most willingly ordered this letter to be made, confirm it with my own hand. I, João, Archbishop of Braga. I confirm. I, Bernardo, Bishop of Coimbra. I confirm. I, Pedro, Bishop of Porto. I confirm.) On 1 May 1144, Pope Lucius II replied by letter Devotionen Tuam (Latin for 'Your Devotion') and stated that he recognized Afonso's devotion, but still referred to Portugal as a land instead of a kingdom, and to Afonso as duke instead of a king. (Note: Lucius, Bishop, servant of the servants of God. To his beloved son in Christ, Afonso, illustrious Duke, health and apostolic blessing, etc. We rejoice greatly in your devotion, beloved son in the Lord, because Our Lord Jesus Christ, recognizing you among His sheep, commended you to the care of the blessed Peter. Since you were dedicated to the struggle against the pagans and engaged in many secular affairs, and thus unable to visit the thresholds of the Apostles, through the hand of our beloved son Guido, Cardinal Deacon, then Legate of the Apostolic See in those parts, you rendered homage with praiseworthy devotion to our predecessor of happy memory, Pope Innocent. You offered the land which God entrusted to you to the blessed Peter, and you humbly placed both yourself and your land under the protection of Peter, Prince of the Apostles. Afterward, in truth, both through your own letters and by the mediation of our venerable brother João, Archbishop of Braga, you also promised that you and your heirs would pay annually, from the same land, four ounces of gold to the Roman Pontiff. Therefore, we, who—though unworthy—seek to sit in the place of the blessed Peter, receive both you and your sons and your successors among the heirs of the Prince of the Apostles himself, with his help, so that you may always remain under his blessing and protection, both in soul and in body. Through this blessing, may you be defended from the assaults of visible and invisible enemies, and with the Lord's permission, may you attain the heavenly kingdoms. Given at the Lateran, on the Calends of May (i.e., May 1st).)

The switch in papal policy in 1179 was caused by Afonso's conquest of lands in the south of the Iberian Peninsula to which no other Christian monarch had claim. The papal bull itself was later confirmed on 16 April 1212, during the reign of King Afonso II by Pope Innocent III with the papal bull Manifestis Probatum and again on 11 January 1218 with the bull Manifestis Probatum est of Pope Honorius III addressed to the same king.

== Text ==
Alexander, Bishop, Servant of the servants of God, to the most beloved son in Christ, Afonso, Illustrious King of the Portuguese, and to his heirs, in perpetuity:

It is manifestly proven that, as a good son and catholic prince, you have rendered innumerable services to your mother, the Holy Church, intrepidly exterminating through hardships and military prowess the enemies of the Christian name and diligently propagating the Christian faith, thereby leaving to generations still unborn a name worthy of memory and an example deserving of imitation. The Apostolic See must love with sincere affection and strive to efficiently attend, in their just petitions, those chosen by the divine Providence for the government and salvation of the people.

We, therefore, because of your qualities of prudence, justice and suitability for government, take you under the protection of Saint Peter and our own, and grant and confirm by apostolic authority to your excellent domain, the Kingdom of Portugal, full honours of kingdom and the dignity that befits kings, as well as all places which, with the help of the Celestial Grace, you have wrested from the hands of the Saracens, and to which your neighbouring Christian princes may not claim any rights.

And so that your devotion and service to Saint Peter, Prince of the Apostles, and to the Holy Roman Church is further aroused, We decide to extend this same concession to your heirs and, with the help of God, We promise to defend it for them, as far as our apostolic magistracy is concerned. Do continue, therefore, to show yourself a beloved son, humble and devoted to the honour and service of your mother, the Holy Roman Church, and to defend Her interests by spreading the Christian faith in such a way that this Apostolic See may take joy in having such a devoted and glorious son whose affection cannot be in doubt.

As tangible representation that said kingdom belongs to Saint Peter, you have determined as a testimony of great reverence to surrender annually two marks of gold to Us and Our successors. You and your successors will endeavour, therefore, to consign to the Archbishop of Braga pro tempore this census that belongs to Us and Our successors. (Note: This payment was made up until the reign of King Afonso III)

We determine accordingly that it is unlawful for any man to brazenly cause any trouble to you or your heirs or your kingdom, or to seize anything that belongs to it or, in the case it has been seized, to keep it, debase it, or cause any torment to it.

If anyone, in future, whether ecclesiastic or secular person, willingly challenges that which has been determined under this Constitution without presenting suitable satisfaction after a second or a third admonition, may they be stripped of the dignity of their honour and power, forelearn that they will be held accountable for their iniquity before the Divine Judgement, and be excluded from the Communion of the Most Holy Body and Blood of Jesus Christ, our divine Lord and Redeemer. May the peace of Our Lord Jesus Christ be with all those who respect the rights of this kingdom and their king, so that they may gather the fruit of good works in this world and the reward of eternal peace before the Severe Judge. Amen. Amen.

Peter, Paul, Alexander PP. III
I Alexander, Bishop of the Catholic Church, SS (Note: subscripsi)
BENE VALETE

I Ubaldo Bishop of Ostia SS
I Theodinus Bishop of Porto and of Santa Rufina SS
I Pietro Bishop of Frascati SS
I Henry Bishop of Albano SS
I Benerede Bishop of Palestrina SS
I Giovanni Cardinal Presbyter of the title of Saints John and Paul and of Pammachius SS
I Giovanni Cardinal Presbyter of the title of Sant'Anastasia SS
I Joannes Cardinal Presbyter of the title of San Marco SS
I Pietro Cardinal Presbyter of the title of Santa Susanna SS
I Vibiano Cardinal Presbyter of the title of Santo Stefano al Monte Celio SS
I Cinzio Cardinal Presbyter of the title of Santa Cecilia SS
I Ugo Cardinal Presbyter of the title of San Clemente SS
I Ardoino Cardinal Presbyter of the title of the Santa Croce in Gerusalemme SS
I Mathieu Cardinal Presbyter of the title of San Marcello SS
I Giacinto Cardinal Deacon of the title of Santa Maria in Cosmedin SS
I Ardicio Cardinal Deacon of the title of San Teodoro SS
I Laborante Cardinal Deacon of the title of Santa Maria in Portico SS
I Raniero Cardinal Deacon of the title of San Giorgio in Velabro SS
I Graziano Cardinal Deacon of the title of the Santi Cosma e Damiano SS
I Giovanni Cardinal Deacon of the title of Sant'Angelo SS
I Rainier Cardinal Deacon of the title of Sant'Adriano SS
I Matteo Cardinal Deacon of the title of Santa Maria Nova SS
I Bernardo Cardinal Deacon of the title of San Nicola in Carcere SS

Given at the Lateran, by the hand of Alberto, Cardinal Presbyter and Chancellor of the Holy Roman Church, on the 10th day before the calends of June, (Note: May 23) in the 11th indiction, the year 1179 of the Incarnation of the Lord and the 20th year of the Pontificate of Pope Alexander III.

== See also ==
- History of Portugal
  - Portugal in the Middle Ages
- Timeline of Portuguese history
  - Timeline of Portuguese history (First Dynasty)
- Reconquista
