= 1181 papal election =

Election of Catholic Pope Lucius III

Papal election 1181

Dates and location
- 1 September 1181; Rome

Key officials
- Dean: Ubaldo Allucingoli
- Sub-dean: Konrad von Wittelsbach
- Protopriest: Alberto di Morra
- Protodeacon: Giacinto Bobone Orsini

Elected pope
- Ubaldo Allucingoli; Name taken: Lucius III
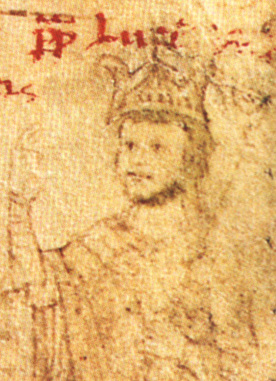

The 1181 papal election followed the death of Pope Alexander III and resulted in the election of Pope Lucius III. This was the first papal election celebrated in accordance with the decree Licet de evitanda discordia, promulgated in the Third Lateran Council in 1179, which established that the pope is elected by a majority of two thirds votes.

== Licet de evitanda discordia ==
The contested papal election, 1159, which resulted in the election of Pope Alexander III and Antipope Victor IV (1159–1164), created a schism in the Catholic Church that lasted almost twenty years (until 1178). In 1159 the cardinals were unable to achieve consensus, though an electoral compact had set that as its goal. The cardinals had been divided into two parties, those who favored the Emperor Frederick Barbarossa and those who favored William I of Sicily, and each of them elected their own pope. In August 1178 Antipope Callixtus III, the successor of Victor IV, finally submitted to Alexander III. In the following year Alexander III celebrated the Third Lateran Council, which promulgated the decree Licet de evitanda discordia. To avoid schism in the future, the decree established that the pope is elected with the majority of two thirds of the cardinals, if unanimity cannot be achieved. It confirmed also that the cardinals are the sole electors of the pope.

== Election of Lucius III ==
Pope Alexander III died on August 30, 1181, in Civita Castellana. Two days later, on September 1, 1181, the cardinals assembled at Rome (probably at Lateran or Vatican Basilica) and unanimously elected the senior member of the Sacred College, Cardinal Ubaldo of Lucca, Bishop of Ostia. He took the name Lucius III. On September 6, 1181, he was crowned by Cardinal Teodino of Porto at Velletri.

== Cardinal-electors ==
There were probably 27 cardinals in the Sacred College of Cardinals in 1181. Based on the examination of the subscriptions of the papal bulls in 1181 and the available data about the external missions of the cardinals it is possible to establish that no more than 19 cardinals participated in the election:

Elector	Place of birth	Cardinalatial title	Elevated	Elevator	Notes
Ubaldo Allucingoli	Lucca	Bishop of Ostia	December 16, 1138	Innocent II	Dean of the Sacred College of Cardinals
Theodinus	Arrone, Tuscany	Bishop of Porto e Santa Rufina	December 18, 1165	Alexander III	
Paolo Scolari	Rome	Bishop of Palestrina	September 21, 1179	Alexander III	Archpriest of the patriarchal Liberian Basilica; future Pope Clement III (1187–1191)
Alberto di Morra, C.R.	Benevento	Priest of S. Lorenzo in Lucina and Chancellor of the Holy Roman Church	December 21, 1156	Adrian IV	Protopriest; future Pope Gregory VIII (1187)
Joannes Anagninus (Giovanni dei Conti di Anagni)	Anagni	Priest of S. Marco	1158/1159	Adrian IV	Future bishop of Palestrina (1190–1196)
Cinthius Capellus	Rome (?)	Priest of S. Cecilia	March 14, 1158	Adrian IV	nephew of Innocent II
Pietro de Bono, Can.Reg.	Rome	Priest of S. Susanna	March 18, 1166	Alexander III	
Uguccione Pierleoni	Rome	Priest of S. Clemente	March 2, 1173	Alexander III	Relative of Anacletus II (1130–1138)
Laborans de Pontormo	Pontormo near Florence	Priest of S. Maria in Trastevere	September 21, 1173	Alexander III	
Viviano	Orvieto (?)	Priest of S. Stefano in Monte Celio	March 7, 1175	Alexander III	
Ardoino da Piacenza, Can.Reg.	Piacenza	Priest of S. Croce in Gerusalemme	June 2, 1178	Alexander III	
Matthieu d’Anjou	Angers	Priest of S. Marcello	December 22, 1178	Alexander III	
Giacinto Bobone	Rome	Deacon of S. Maria in Cosmedin	December 22, 1144	Lucius II	Protodeacon; future Pope Celestine III (1191–1198)
Ardicio Rivoltella	Piadena (Platina) near Cremona	Deacon of S. Teodoro	December 21, 1156	Adrian IV	
Rainiero da Pavia	Pavia	Deacon of S. Giorgio in Velabro	June 6, 1175	Alexander III	
Matteo, Can.Reg.	Unknown (possibly Rome)	Deacon of S. Maria Nuova	March 4, 1178	Alexander III	
Graziano da Pisa	Pisa	Deacon of SS. Sergio e Bacco	March 4, 1178	Alexander III	Nephew of Pope Eugene III
Rainier	Unknown	Deacon of S. Adriano	September 22, 1178	Alexander III	
Giovanni	Unknown	Deacon of S. Angelo in Pescheria	September 22, 1178	Alexander III	

Thirteen electors were created by Pope Alexander III, four by Pope Adrian IV, one by Pope Innocent II and one by Lucius II.

== Absentee cardinals ==
Elector	Place of birth	Cardinalatial title	Elevated	Elevator	Notes
Konrad von Wittelsbach	Bavaria	Bishop of Sabina and Archbishop of Salzburg	December 18, 1165	Alexander III	Subdean of the Sacred College of Cardinals; external cardinal
Henri de Marsiac, O.Cist.	Château de Marcy, France	Bishop of Albano	March 1179	Alexander III	Papal legate in France
Pietro da Pavia, Can.Reg.	Pavia or France	Bishop of Tusculum	September 21, 1173	Aleksander III	Papal legate in France and Germany; archbishop-elect of Bourges
Giovanni da Napoli, Can.Reg.	Naples	Priest of S. Anastasia	September 21, 1150	Eugenius III	Papal legate in Constantinople
Ruggiero di San Severino, O.S.B.Cas.	San Severino	Priest of S. Eusebio and Archbishop of Benevento	Circa 1178-1180	Alexander III	External cardinal
Guillaume aux Blanches Mains	France	Priest of S. Sabina and Archbishop of Reims	March 1179	Alexander III	External cardinal
Simeone Borelli, O.S.B.Cas.	Campagna	Deacon of S. Maria in Domnica	Circa 1157	Adrian IV	Abbot of Subiaco (external cardinal)
Leonato de Manoppello, O.S.B.	Manoppello (?)	Deacon of the Holy Roman Church	March 21, 1170	Alexander III	Abbot of S. Clemente in Casauria; external cardinal

== Sources ==
- Adams, John Paul (2011). "Sede Vacante 1181". California State University Northridge. Retrieved: 10 February 2022.
- Brixius, Johannes Matthias (1912). Die Mitglieder des Kardinalkollegiums von 1130-1181 (in German). Berlin: R. Trenkel.
- Ganzer, Klaus (1963). Die Entwicklung des auswärtigen Kardinalats im hohen Mittelalter. Ein Beitrag zur Geschichte des Kardinalkollegiums vom 11.bis 13. Jahrhundert. Bibliothek des Deutschen Historischen Instituts in Rom (in German). Tübingen: Max Niemeyer Verlag.
- Gregorovius, Ferdinand (1905). The History of Rome in the Middle Ages Vol. IV, part 2. 2nd ed. London: George Bell 1905.
- Jaffé, Phillipp (1888). Regesta pontificum Romanorum ab condita Ecclesia ad annum post Christum natum MCXCVIII, vol. II (in Latin). Leipzig: Veit et comp.
- Kartusch, Elfriede (1948). Das Kardinalskollegium in der Zeit von 1181–1227 (in German). Wien.
- Regesta Imperii (in German). Akademie der Wissenschaften und der Literatur, Mainz. 2006–2009.
- Robinson, Ian Stuart (1990). The Papacy 1073–1198. Continuity and Innovation. Cambridge Medieval Textbooks. Cambridge University Press. ISBN 0-521-31922-6.
