= José Guerrero de Torres =

Most Reverend José Guerrero de Torres
- Bishop of Gaeta
- Church: Catholic Church
- Diocese: Diocese of Gaeta
- In office: 1693–1720
- Predecessor: José Sanz de Villaragut
- Successor: Carlo Pignatelli

Orders
- Consecration: 18 April 1693 by Paluzzo Paluzzi Altieri Degli Albertoni

Personal details
- Born: 21 February 1641 Antequera, Spain
- Died: 26 March 1720 (age 79) Gaeta, Italy

José Guerrero de Torres, O.E.S.A. (21 February 1641 – 26 March 1720) was a Roman Catholic prelate who served as Bishop of Gaeta (1693–1720).

== Biography ==
José Guerrero de Torres was born in Antequera, Spain on 21 February 1641 and ordained a priest in the Order of Hermits of Saint Augustine. On 13 April 1693, he was appointed Bishop of Gaeta by Pope Innocent XII. On 18 April 1693, he was consecrated bishop by Paluzzo Paluzzi Altieri Degli Albertoni, Cardinal-Bishop of Palestrina, with Prospero Bottini, Titular Archbishop of Myra, and Domenico Antonio Bernardini, Bishop of Castellaneta, serving as co-consecrators. He served as Bishop of Gaeta until his death on 26 March 1720.

== External links and additional sources ==
- Cheney, David M. "Archdiocese of Gaeta". Catholic-Hierarchy.org. (for Chronology of Bishops) ^{[self-published]}
- Chow, Gabriel. "Archdiocese of Gaeta (Italy)". GCatholic.org. (for Chronology of Bishops) ^{[self-published]}

Catholic Church titles
Preceded by José Sanz de Villaragut	Bishop of Gaeta; 1693–1720	Succeeded by Carlo Pignatelli
