= Carlo Falconi (bishop) =

Italian Roman Catholic prelate

Most Reverend Carlo Falconi
- Bishop of Castellaneta
- Church: Catholic Church
- Diocese: Diocese of Castellaneta
- In office: 1673–1677
- Predecessor: Carlo Antonio Agudio
- Successor: Domenico Antonio Bernardini

Orders
- Ordination: 11 March 1673

Personal details
- Born: 1622 Civitate Ducali, Italy
- Died: January 1677 (age 55) Castellaneta, Italy

Carlo Falconi (1622 – January 1677) was a Roman Catholic prelate who served as Bishop of Castellaneta (1673–1677).

== Biography ==
Carlo Falconi was born in Civitate Ducali, Italy in 1622 and ordained a priest on 11 March 1673. On 13 March 1673, he was appointed during the papacy of Pope Clement X as Bishop of Castellaneta. He served as Bishop of Castellaneta until his death in January 1677.

== External links and additional sources ==
- Cheney, David M. "Diocese of Castellaneta". Catholic-Hierarchy.org. (for Chronology of Bishops) ^{[self-published]}
- Chow, Gabriel. "Diocese of Castellaneta (Italy)". GCatholic.org. (for Chronology of Bishops) ^{[self-published]}

Catholic Church titles
Preceded by Carlo Antonio Agudio	Bishop of Castellaneta; 1673–1677	Succeeded by Domenico Antonio Bernardini
