= Onofrio Montesoro =

18th-century Italian Catholic bishop

Most Reverend Onofrio Montesoro
- Bishop of Castellaneta
- Church: Catholic Church
- Diocese: Diocese of Castellaneta
- In office: 1696–1722
- Predecessor: Domenico Antonio Bernardini
- Successor: Luigi Maria de Dura

Orders
- Consecration: 21 December 1696 by Sebastiano Antonio Tanara

Personal details
- Born: 8 June 1647 Bari, Italy
- Died: 24 December 1722 (age 75) Castellaneta, Italy

Onofrio Montesoro or Onuphrio Montesoro (8 June 1647 – 24 December 1722) was a Roman Catholic prelate who served as Bishop of Castellaneta (1696–1722).

== Biography ==
Onofrio Montesoro was born in Bari, Italy. He was ordained a deacon on 2 February 1689 and ordained a priest on 6 February 1689. On 17 December 1696, he was appointed during the papacy of Pope Innocent XII as Bishop of Castellaneta. On 21 December 1696, he was consecrated bishop by Sebastiano Antonio Tanara, Cardinal-Priest of Santi Quattro Coronati, with Prospero Bottini, Titular Archbishop of Myra, and Giorgio Spinola, Bishop of Albenga, serving as co-consecrators. He served as Bishop of Castellaneta until his death on 24 December 1722.

== External links and additional sources ==
- Cheney, David M. "Diocese of Castellaneta". Catholic-Hierarchy.org. (for Chronology of Bishops) ^{[self-published]}
- Chow, Gabriel. "Diocese of Castellaneta (Italy)". GCatholic.org. (for Chronology of Bishops) ^{[self-published]}

Catholic Church titles
Preceded by Domenico Antonio Bernardini	Bishop of Castellaneta; 1696–1722	Succeeded by Luigi Maria de Dura
