= Andrea Cornaro (cardinal) =

Italian Roman Catholic bishop and cardinal

Andrea Cornaro (1511–1551) was an Italian Roman Catholic bishop and cardinal.

== Biography ==
Andrea Cornaro (born in 1511 in Venice) was an Italian clergyman and bishop for the Roman Catholic Archdiocese of Split-Makarska, and later for Brescia. He was ordained in 1527. He was appointed bishop in 1527. He died in 1551.

A member of the House of Cornaro, Andrea Cornaro was born in Venice on 18 December 1511, the son of Giacomo Cornaro. He was the nephew of Cardinals Marco Cornaro and Francesco Cornaro, and a cousin of Cardinals Luigi Cornaro and Federico Cornaro.

On 13 March 1532 he was elected Bishop of Brescia. He was appointed administrator of the diocese until he reached the canonical age of 30; he thereafter occupied the see until his death. In 1534, he became a cleric in the Apostolic Camera.

Pope Paul III made him a cardinal deacon in the consistory of 19 December 1544. He received the red hat and the deaconry of San Teodoro on 9 January 1545.

As cardinal, he attended a few sessions of the Council of Trent. He was also a participant in the papal conclave of 1549-50 that elected Pope Julius III. The new pope made Cardinal Cornaro papal legate in Viterbo and the Patrimonium Sancti Petri. On 27 June 1550 he opted for the deaconry of Santa Maria in Domnica.

A scholar, he published two pastoral works, De statu praelatorium and De residentia episcoporum. Seven volumes of his letters in Latin and two volumes in the Venetian language were also published.

He died in Rome on 30 January 1551. He was initially buried in the Basilica di Sant'Agostino. His remains were later transferred to Venice and buried in the family tomb in San Salvador.
