= Vincenzo Fagiolo =

Italian Roman Catholic Cardinal (1918-2000)

His Eminence Vincenzo Fagiolo
- President Emeritus of the Disciplinary Commission of the Roman Curia
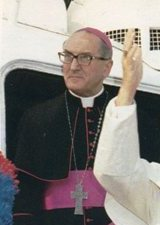
- Church: Roman Catholic Church
- Appointed: 29 December 1990
- Term ended: 14 February 1998
- Predecessor: Rosalio José Castillo Lara
- Successor: Mario Francesco Pompedda
- Other post: Cardinal-Deacon of San Teodoro (1994–2000)
- Previous posts: Prelate Auditor of the Roman Rota (1968–71); Apostolic Administrator of Vasto (1971–82); Archbishop of Chieti (1971–84); Bishop of Vasto (1982–84); Secretary of the Congregation for Institutes of Consecrated Life and Societies of Apostolic Life (1984–90); President of the Pontifical Council for the Interpretation of Legislative Texts (1990–94)

Orders
- Ordination: 6 March 1943
- Consecration: 19 December 1971 by Carlo Confalonieri
- Created cardinal: 26 November 1994 by Pope John Paul II
- Rank: Cardinal-Deacon

Personal details
- Born: Vincenzo Fagiolo; 5 February 1918 Segni, Italy
- Died: 22 September 2000 (aged 82) Rome, Italy
- Education: Pontifical Roman Major Seminary; Pontifical Lateran University; Sapienza University of Rome
- Motto: Plenitudo legis dilectio

Styles of Vincenzo Fagiolo
- Reference style: His Eminence
- Spoken style: Your Eminence
- Informal style: Cardinal
- See: Chieti

Vincenzo Fagiolo (5 February 1918 in Segni – 22 September 2000) was an Italian cardinal and President of the Pontifical Council for Legislative Texts from 1990 until 1994.

== Biography ==
Fagiolo was educated at the Seminary of Segni, the Seminary of Anagni and at the Pontifical Lateran University, earning doctorates in theology and canon law. He was ordained on 6 March 1943, and worked in the Diocese of Rome from 1943 to 1971.

As a young priest at the parish of Saints Fabiano and Venanzio, Father Fagiolo assisted Father Pietro Palazzini, vice rector of the Pontifical Major Roman Seminary, in sheltering Jews from the Nazis, on the grounds of the Basilica of St. John Lateran. For this Fagiolo, Palazzini were honored in 1983 as "Righteous Among the Nations" by Yad Vashem.

He attended the Second Vatican Council as an expert. Pope Paul VI appointed him Archbishop of Chieti-Vasto on 20 November 1971. He served as Vice-President of the Episcopal Conference of Italy from 1979 until 1984. Fagiolo was honoured by Yad Vashem as Righteous Among the Nations in 1983. He resigned the pastoral government of the archdiocese 15 July 1984. On 15 December 1990, Pope John Paul II named him President of the Pontifical Council for Legislative Texts. He was created and proclaimed Cardinal-Deacon of S. Teodoro in the consistory of 26 November 1994. He was replaced as president of the Pontifical Council on 19 December 1994. He died on 22 September 2000.

Catholic Church titles
Preceded by Rosalio José Castillo Lara	President of the Pontifical Council for Legislative Texts; 1990–1994	Succeeded by Julián Herranz Casado
