= Vincenzo Franco =

- Archbishop Emeritus of Otranto
- Church: Roman Catholic Church
- See: Diocese of Otranto
- In office: 1981–1993
- Predecessor: Nicola Riezzo
- Successor: Francesco Cacucci
- Previous post(s): Anglona-Tursi Diocese; Bishop

Orders
- Ordination: 6 July 1947
- Consecration: 26 January 1975 by Sebastiano Cardinal Baggio

Personal details
- Born: 1 June 1917; Trani, Italy
- Died: 4 March 2016 (aged 98)

Vincenzo Franco (1 June 1917 – 4 March 2016) was an Italian prelate of Roman Catholic Church. He was one of oldest Roman Catholic bishops and Italian bishops.

Franco was born in Trani, Italy and was ordained a priest on 6 July 1947. Franco was appointed bishop of Anglona-Tursi Diocese on 12 December 1974 and consecrated on 26 January 1975. Franco was then appointed bishop of the Diocese of Otranto on 27 January 1981 and remained there until his retirement on 8 April 1993.
