= Nicola Riezzo =

Italian Roman Catholic prelate

Servant of God Nicola Riezzo
- Archbishop Emeritus of Otranto
- Church: Roman Catholic Church
- Archdiocese: Otranto
- See: Otranto
- Appointed: 28 April 1969
- Installed: 1 June 1969
- Retired: 27 January 1981
- Predecessor: Gaetano Pollio
- Successor: Vincenzo Franco
- Previous posts: Bishop of Castellaneta (1958-69); Apostolic Administrator of Ugento-Santa Maria di Leuca (1969-74)

Orders
- Ordination: 21 August 1927 by Gennaro Trama
- Consecration: 29 June 1958 by Francesco Minerva

Personal details
- Born: Nicola Riezzo; 11 December 1904 Squinzano, Lecce, Kingdom of Italy
- Died: 20 August 1998 (aged 93) Squinzano, Lecce, Italy
- Education: Almo Collegio Capranica; Pontifical Gregorian University
- Motto: Caritas Christi urget nos

Nicola Riezzo (11 December 1904 - 20 August 1998) was an Italian Roman Catholic prelate who served as the Archbishop of Otranto from 1969 until his retirement in 1981. He had served prior to this as the Bishop of Castellaneta and concurrent to his term in office as an apostolic administrator for another diocese. Riezzo was well known for his holiness, with the priests in his diocese coming to love and admire him due to his careful attention to evangelization and catechesis. He had served as a professor following his ordination in Assisi and Molfetta prior to being nominated to the episcopate. Following his retirement in 1981 he moved to his hometown where he served as a pastor in his childhood San Nicola parish where he was known for remaining for extended periods in the confessional and out visiting the sick.

His holiness had been noted as a bishop in both dioceses and steps were taken after his death in 1998 in order to launch the cause for his beatification. These initial steps culminated in 2004 after the cause commenced and Riezzo was titled as a Servant of God.

== Life ==
Nicola Riezzo was born on 11 December 1904 in Squinzano in the Lecce province as the third of six children. He was baptized on 12 December in the local San Nicola parish church. His paternal uncle Vincenzo Riezzo was a priest and served as an influence on Nicola's childhood and approach to faith.

He attended school first at the Calasanzio-run institute at Campi Salentina and then in 1923 entered the Capranica College in Rome in addition to the Pontifical Gregorian where he earned a degree in theological studies. He received his ordination to the priesthood in the San Nicola parish on 21 August 1927 from Gennaro Trama and following this taught students in Lecce. Riezzo later started serving as a professor for theological studies in Assisi from 1932 until 1934 and then taught dogmatics in Molfetta from 1934 until 1958 in addition to teaching asceticism. His teaching methods were noted for being both exceptional and methodical. Salvatore De Giorgi - future cardinal - was a student of his while he served as a professor.

Riezzo was nominated in 1958 as the newest Bishop of Castellaneta and he received his episcopal consecration in the Lecce Cathedral on 29 June 1958 from Francesco Minerva and with Corrado Ursi and Guglielmo Montolese serving as the co-consecrators. He was known in his diocese for being humble but firm when required and was well known for his wisdom and for his tireless apostolic zeal in evangelization. His priests in the diocese came to love and admire him for his affection and for his pastoral sensitivities. Pope Paul VI later appointed him on 28 April 1969 as the Archbishop of Otranto where he was enthroned on 1 June and began visiting all the parishes. He had new churches constructed and was close to the archdiocese's seminarians whom he lunched with once a week. On 5 October 1980 he hosted Pope John Paul II in his diocese.

On 26 November 1972 he announced that he would commence his first pastoral visit, which began two months later. He announced the second on 8 December 1977 which began in Lent in 1978. On 14 August 1979 he opened in his archdiocese the "Year of Christian Witness" that ended in 1980. Concurrent to his duties in Otranto he served as the apostolic administrator of another diocese from 28 April 1969 until a new bishop was appointed to head the see on 12 October 1974. He had also attended all sessions of the Second Vatican Council.

Riezzo retired from his duties in 1981 and in retirement moved back to his hometown where he offered his services as a parish priest to the San Nicola parish. He was known for spending long periods in the confessional in addition to speaking with people out on the streets and comforting the sick. He was known to also often teach catechism to children.

He died on 20 August 1998 in his hometown and his funeral was celebrated there on 22 August with Archbishop of Lecce Cosmo Francesco Ruppi presiding.

== Beatification process ==
The beatification process opened under Pope John Paul II on 27 October 2004 after the Congregation for the Causes of Saints issued the nihil obstat decree and titled Riezzo as a Servant of God; the diocesan process was opened in Lecce on 27 June 2005 and later closed on 7 October 2008. The postulator for this cause is Fr. Luigi Manca.
