= Giovanni Gaetano Orsini (died 1335) =

Roman nobleman

His Eminence Giovanni Gaetano Orsini
- Cardinal deacon of San Teodoro

Orders
- Created cardinal: 17 December 1316
- Rank: Cardinal deacon

Personal details
- Born: ca. 1285 Rome, Italy
- Died: 27 August 1335 Avignon, France
- Buried: Church of the Franciscans, Avignon
- Education: University of Padua

Giovanni Gaetano Orsini (c. 1285 – 27 August 1335), Cardinal of the Holy Roman Church from 17 December 1316 until his death, was a Roman nobleman, a nephew of Pope Nicholas III and a grandson of Matteo Rosso Orsini.

He was sometimes recorded under the names Gian Gaetano Orsini and Giangaetano Orsini.

In 1326 the Avignon Pope John XXII sent him as his Legate a latere to Italy, then much troubled by civil wars, with the task of bringing peace. In the event, Orsini found himself embroiled in battles with the Emperor Ludwig of Bavaria and his antipope Nicholas V. After taking Rome and becoming Captain of the city, he pursued his own Orsini interests, however, and lost the support of the pope. He was dismissed as legate in 1334 and died the next year.

== Early life ==
Orsini was the son of Matteo Rosso II Orsini, who was prominent in the public life of Rome in the 13th century, and a grandson of Matteo Rosso Orsini the great (1178–1246), who had held almost a dictatorship over Rome in the early 1240s. He was thus a member of the Monterotondo branch of the Orsini family. Born about 1285, he was given exactly the same name as his father's brother, Giovanni Gaetano Orsini, better known as Pope Nicholas III, who had died in 1280.

He was enrolled at the University of Padua from 1308 to 1310 and studied letters, including rhetoric. He seems not to have made a study of law formally, but he had a wide knowledge of it, while he had very little of theology. He was already a canon of Reims Cathedral before 1308.

== Career ==
By 1316 Orsini was at the papal palace in Avignon serving his cousin Cardinal Napoleone Orsini, through whose offices in September 1316 he was appointed archdeacon of Bibiesca, Burgos, and a protonotary apostolic. In the consistory of 17 December 1316 he was created cardinal deacon of San Teodoro and in 1317 received the title of San Marco in commendam.

From 1326 to 1334 Orsini was Pope John XXII's legate a latere in Italy, with particular faculties over the provinces of Romagna, Tuscany, Sardinia, and Marca Umbria, which were troubled by civil wars, and was given the task of pacifying them. John chose Orsini as his legate, seeing him as an Italian prince who could find his way through the maze of Italian politics as no Gaul could hope to do. However, the people of Italy saw Orsini not as an Italian but as a Roman, and very specifically as a prince of the Orsini family.

The interests of the Pope were more scholarly than political, and he entrusted many practical decisions to Orsini. At the end of 1327, an embassy from Rome to Avignon offered the Pope a stark ultimatum: if he did not immediately return to the city, Rome would submit to his opponent Ludwig of Bavaria. The Pope declined to be commanded, and Orsini attempted to enter Rome but was turned away, retaliating by placing an interdict on the city. In January 1328 Ludwig was crowned Holy Roman Emperor in Rome and installed as Antipope Nicholas V. However, Ludwig was almost entirely dependent in Rome on Sciarra Colonna and lacked the support of Stefano Colonna the Younger. In the summer of 1328, his remaining support melted away when Robert, King of Naples, sent a fleet to blockade the port of Ostia, while Orsini massed forces outside the city. Ludwig and his antipope fled the city on 4 August, and Orsini entered it triumphantly on Sunday, 8 August. Ten days later an Angevin army led by William, Count of Eboli, marched into Rome in the name of Robert of Naples. Late in 1328, Orsini began a campaign against Corneto and Viterbo, which were harbouring the antipope. Both cities submitted to papal authority in 1329. The same year, the antipope also surrendered himself to the Pope, while Ludwig remained as a powerful enemy of the Pope in his Empire to the north.

As Orsini's power increased, he expanded the influence of his family in Rome and also pursued a policy of aggrandizing the Roman commune itself in the region. In the later months of 1329 and early 1330, the militia of Rome raided the towns of the Campagne and Maritime Province to extract new taxes from them. When the Pope heard of this, he wrote to Orsini ordering him to stop the practice, but it continued. Two months later the Pope had to write again, this time addressing Orsini as Captain of the city (capitaneatum Urbis). By the early 1330s Orsini had assumed signorile power in Rome. The Pope also disapproved of Orsini's hostilities against the Colonna family. Eventually, Pope John ordered Orsini back to Tuscany, and in 1332 Stefano Colonna the Younger was appointed as the "vicar in Rome" of Robert of Naples, continuing to lead the Colonna war against the Orsini.

In August 1334, the Pope cancelled Orsini's legation. Orsini returned to Avignon, where he remained until his death a year later.

Following the death of Pope John XXII on 4 December 1334, Orsini took part in the conclave which elected Pope Benedict XII. He died on 27 August 1335 at Avignon and was entombed there in the church of the Franciscans.

== Likeness ==
In his Will, Orsini left money for the saying of Masses in the Chapel of St Blaise in Old St Peter's Basilica, Rome. A sculpture of a pope with a cardinal kneeling at his feet, which is thought to have been moved from St Blaise's chapel to the crypt of St Peter's in 1623, is supposed to represent Pope Nicholas III and his nephew Orsini, but this is uncertain.

== Bibliography ==
- Blake R. Beattie, Angelus pacis: the legation of Cardinal Giovanni Gaetano Orsini, 1326-1334 (2006)
