= Luigi Cornaro (cardinal) =

Italian Roman Catholic cardinal and bishop

Luigi Cornaro (12 February 1517 – 10 May 1584) was an Italian Roman Catholic cardinal and bishop.

== Biography ==
A member of the House of Cornaro, Luigi Cornaro was born on 12 February 1517, the eldest of the ten children of Giovanni Cornaro, Venetian senator and Procurator of San Marco, and Adriana Pisani. His younger brother Federico Cornaro also became a cardinal. He was the grand-nephew of Catherine Cornaro, Queen of Cyprus, and the nephew of Cardinals Francesco Pisani, Marco Cornaro, and Francesco Cornaro. His cousin Andrea Cornaro also became a cardinal.

As a young man, he joined the Knights Hospitaller, becoming Grand Prior of Cyprus, an office he later resigned in favor of his younger brother Federico Cornaro.

Pope Julius III made him a cardinal deacon in the consistory of 20 November 1551. He received the red hat and the deaconry of San Teodoro on 4 December 1551.

On 25 June 1554 he was elected Archbishop of Zadar and was subsequently consecrated as a bishop. He resigned the government of Zadar on 17 July 1555 in favor of his secretary, Muzio Callini.

He was a participant in the papal conclave of April 1555 that elected Pope Marcellus II, the papal conclave of May 1555 that elected Pope Paul IV, and the papal conclave of 1559 that elected Pope Pius IV.

Under Pope Pius IV, he headed the commission charged with dealing with the riots fomented by the Carafas during the pontificate of Paul IV. He was named administrator of the see of Bergamo on 13 March 1560. He resigned the administration of Bergamo in favor of his nephew Federico on 15 January 1561, at which time he became administrator of the see of Trogir. He resigned that post on 18 April 1567. On 26 February 1561 he opted for the order of cardinal priests, and on 21 June 1564 received the titular church of San Marco.

He participated in the papal conclave of 1565-66 that elected Pope Pius V.

He opted for the titular church of San Vitale on 2 June 1568. He was Camerlengo of the Holy Roman Church from 10 May 1570 until his death. He was a participant in the papal conclave of 1572 that elected Pope Gregory XIII.

He died in Rome on the Feast of the Ascension, 10 May 1584. He was buried in Santa Maria in Trivio.

== See also ==
- Catholic Church in Italy
