= Domenico Antonio Bernardini =

Italian Roman Catholic prelate

Most Reverend Domenico Antonio Bernardini
- Bishop of Mileto
- Church: Catholic Church
- Diocese: Diocese of Mileto
- In office: 1696–1723
- Predecessor: Ottavio Paravicino
- Successor: Ercole Michele d'Aragona
- Previous post: Bishop of Castellaneta (1677–1696)

Orders
- Consecration: 1 May 1677 by Bernardino Rocci

Personal details
- Born: 1647 Lecce, Italy
- Died: January 1723 (age 76) Mileto, Italy

Domenico Antonio Bernardini (1647 – January 1723) was a Roman Catholic prelate who served as Bishop of Mileto (1696–1723) and Bishop of Castellaneta (1677–1696).

== Biography ==
Domenico Antonio Bernardini was born in Lecce, Italy in 1647 and ordained a priest on 25 August 1668. On 26 April 1677, he was appointed during the papacy of Pope Innocent XI as Bishop of Castellaneta. On 1 May 1677, he was consecrated bishop by Bernardino Rocci, Bishop of Orvieto, with Pier Antonio Capobianco, Bishop Emeritus of Lacedonia, Girolamo Barzellini, Bishop of Cariati e Cerenzia, serving as co-consecrators. On 18 June 1696, he was appointed during the papacy of Pope Innocent XII as Bishop of Mileto. He served as Bishop of Mileto until his death in January 1723.

While bishop, he was the principal co-consecrator of José Guerrero de Torres, Bishop of Gaeta (1693) .

== External links and additional sources ==
- Cheney, David M. "Diocese of Castellaneta". Catholic-Hierarchy.org. (for Chronology of Bishops) ^{[self-published]}
- Chow, Gabriel. "Diocese of Castellaneta (Italy)". GCatholic.org. (for Chronology of Bishops) ^{[self-published]}
- Cheney, David M. "Diocese of Mileto–Nicotera–Tropea". Catholic-Hierarchy.org. (for Chronology of Bishops) ^{[self-published]}
- Chow, Gabriel. "Diocese of Mileto–Nicotera–Tropea (Italy)". GCatholic.org. (for Chronology of Bishops) ^{[self-published]}

Catholic Church titles
| Preceded by Carlo Falconi (bishop) | Bishop of Castellaneta; 1677–1696 | Succeeded by Onofrio Montesoro |
| Preceded by Ottavio Paravicino | Bishop of Mileto; 1696–1723 | Succeeded by Ercole Michele d'Aragona |
