= Federico Cornaro (1531–1590) =

Roman Catholic prelate

Cardinal Federico Cornaro
- Cardinal-Priest of Santo Stefano al Monte Celio; Bishop of Bergamo
- Church: Catholic Church
- Diocese: Diocese of Padua
- In office: 1577–1590
- Predecessor: Nicolò Ormanetto
- Successor: Marco Cornaro

Orders
- Created cardinal: 15 January 1586
- Rank: Cardinal-Priest

Personal details
- Born: 9 June 1531 Venice, Italy
- Died: 4 October 1590 (aged 59) Padua, Italy

Federico Cornaro (9 June 1531 – 4 October 1590) was a Roman Catholic prelate who served as Cardinal-Priest of Santo Stefano al Monte Celio (1586–1590), Bishop of Padua (1577–1590), Bishop of Bergamo (1561–1577), and Bishop of Trogir (1560–1561).

== Biography ==
Federico Cornaro was born in Venice, Italy and ordained a priest in the Order of Knights of the Hospital of Saint John of Jerusalem.

On 27 March 1560, he was appointed Bishop of Trogir by Pope Pius IV. On 15 January 1561, he was transferred by Pope Pius IV to the diocese of Bergamo. On 19 July 1577, he was appointed Bishop of Padua by Pope Gregory XIII.

On 18 December 1585, he was elevated to the rank of cardinal by Pope Sixtus V and installed on 15 January 1586 as Cardinal-Priest of Santo Stefano al Monte Celio.

He served as Bishop of Padua until his death on 4 October 1590. While bishop, he was the principal co-consecrator of Bernardo de Benedictis, Bishop of Castellaneta (1585).

== See also ==
- Catholic Church in Italy

== Sources and external links ==
- Caprioli, Adriano (1988). Diocesi di Bergamo (in Italian). Brescia: La Scuola. pp. 170 ff. ISBN 978-88-350-7759-6.
- Cardella, Lorenzo (1793). Memorie storiche de' cardinali della santa romana Chiesa (in Italian). Vol. Tomo quinto (5). Rome: Pagliarini. pp. 234–235.
- Carlsmith, Christopher (2010). A Renaissance Education: Schooling in Bergamo and the Venetian Republic, 1500-1650. University of Toronto Press. pp. 148, 161, 180. ISBN 978-0-8020-9254-0.
- Cornaro, Federico (1580). Constitutiones et decreta ... Federici Cornelii Patavii episcopi in diœcesana Synodo promulgatae die XXX Aprilis, prima et secunda Mai, MDLXXIX: Adjectis in fine, quae a confessariis et concionatoribus urbis et diœcesis maxime sunt animadvertenda (in Latin). Padua.
- Maifreda, Germano (2016). The Business of the Roman Inquisition in the Early Modern Era. New York-London: Routledge-Taylor & Francis. pp. 72–73. ISBN 978-1-317-03463-6.

Catholic Church titles
Preceded by Cristoforo de Nigris	Bishop of Trogir; 1560–1561	Succeeded by Luigi Cornaro
Preceded by Luigi Cornaro	Bishop of Bergamo; 1561-1577	Succeeded by Gerolamo Ragazzoni
Preceded by Nicolò Ormanetto	Bishop of Padua; 1577–1590	Succeeded by Marco Cornaro
Preceded by Matthieu Cointerel	Cardinal-Priest of Santo Stefano al Monte Celio; 1586–1590	Succeeded by Antonio Maria Sauli
