= Castellaneta Cathedral =

Cathedral in Castellaneta, Apulia, Italy

Coordinates: 40.6293°N 16.9409°E

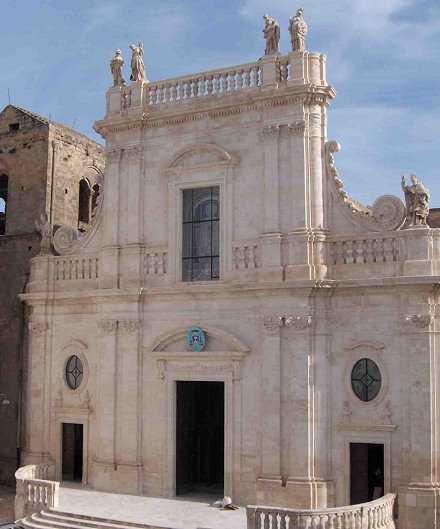
Castellaneta Cathedral

Castellaneta Cathedral (Italian: Duomo di Castellaneta; Cattedrale di Santa Maria Assunta) is a Roman Catholic cathedral in Castellaneta, province of Taranto, Apulia, Italy, dedicated to the Assumption of the Virgin Mary. It is the episcopal seat of the Diocese of Castellaneta.

== History ==
The first cathedral on the site was initially dedicated to Saint Nicholas of Bari, and dated at the latest from the Norman occupation of the last decades of the 11th century. In the 14th century, it was replaced with a Romanesque structure with a basilica layout of a central nave and two aisles separated by columns, all three terminating in semicircular apses. The dedication was changed at this time to the Assumption of the Virgin Mary. Three chapels were later added: the Chapel of the Most Holy Sacrament (Santissimo Sacramento) in 1538 and the Chapel of Mary the Consoler (Santa Maria Consolatrice) in 1643, both founded by confraternities; and the Chapel of the Most Holy Crucifix (Santissimo Crocifisso). There is also a chapel dedicated to Saint Nicholas, with Romanesque capitals. In 1771, a new white limestone façade was added. Today, the bell-tower retains some of the Romanesque-Gothic elements. In the 18th century, new polychrome altars were built. The cathedral underwent restoration in 2008.

The Bishop's Palace is adjacent.

== Artworks ==
The cathedral has 3 canvases painted by Carlo Porta.

== See also ==
- Catholic Church in Italy
