= Bernardo de Benedictis =

16th-century Catholic bishop

Most Reverend Bernardo de Benedictis
- Bishop of Castellaneta
- Church: Catholic Church
- Diocese: Diocese of Castellaneta
- In office: 1585–1607
- Predecessor: Giovanni Luigi Benedetti
- Successor: Aureolo Averoldi

Orders
- Consecration: 12 Mar 1585 by Agostino Valier

Personal details
- Died: 1607

Bernardo de Benedictis (died 1607) was a Roman Catholic prelate who served as Bishop of Castellaneta (1585–1607).

== Biography ==
On 28 Jan 1585, he was appointed during the papacy of Pope Gregory XIII as Bishop of Castellaneta. On 12 Mar 1585, he was consecrated bishop by Agostino Valier, Bishop of Verona, with Filippo Mocenigo, Archbishop of Nicosia, and Federico Cornaro, Bishop of Padua, serving as co-consecrators. He served as Bishop of Castellaneta until his death in 1607.

While bishop, he was the principal co-consecrator of Aloisio Grimani, Archbishop of Candia (1605).

== External links and additional sources ==
- Cheney, David M. "Diocese of Castellaneta". Catholic-Hierarchy.org. (for Chronology of Bishops)
- Chow, Gabriel. "Diocese of Castellaneta (Italy)". GCatholic.org. (for Chronology of Bishops)

Catholic Church titles
Preceded by Giovanni Luigi Benedetti	Bishop of Castellaneta; 1585–1607	Succeeded by Aureolo Averoldi
