= Bobo of San Teodoro =

Catholic cardinal (died 1199)

Bobo of San Teodoro (died 9 October 1199) was an Italian cardinal.

He was a relative of Pope Celestine III, who named him cardinal-deacon of San Teodoro on 20 February 1193. He subscribed papal bulls between 4 March 1193 and 19 June 1199. His death is recorded in the necrology of the Vatican Basilica, of which he was canon before his promotion to the cardinalate.
