= Diocese of Castellaneta =

Latin Catholic diocese in Italy

Coordinates: 40.6333°N 16.9333°E

Diocese of Castellaneta Dioecesis Castellanetensis

Catholic
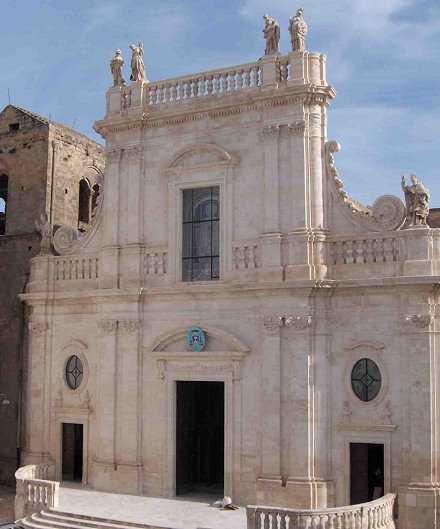
- Castellaneta Cathedral

Location
- Country: Italy
- Ecclesiastical province: Taranto

Statistics
- Area: 1,043 km^{2} (403 sq mi)
- Population: Total; Catholics: (as of 2013); 128,687; 125,861 (97.8%)
- Parishes: 33

Information
- Denomination: Catholic Church
- Sui iuris church: Latin Church
- Rite: Roman Rite
- Established: 11th century
- Cathedral: Cattedrale di Santa Maria Assunta
- Secular priests: 46 (diocesan); 8 (Religious Orders)

Current leadership
- Pope: Leo XIV
- Bishop: Sabino Iannuzzi

Map
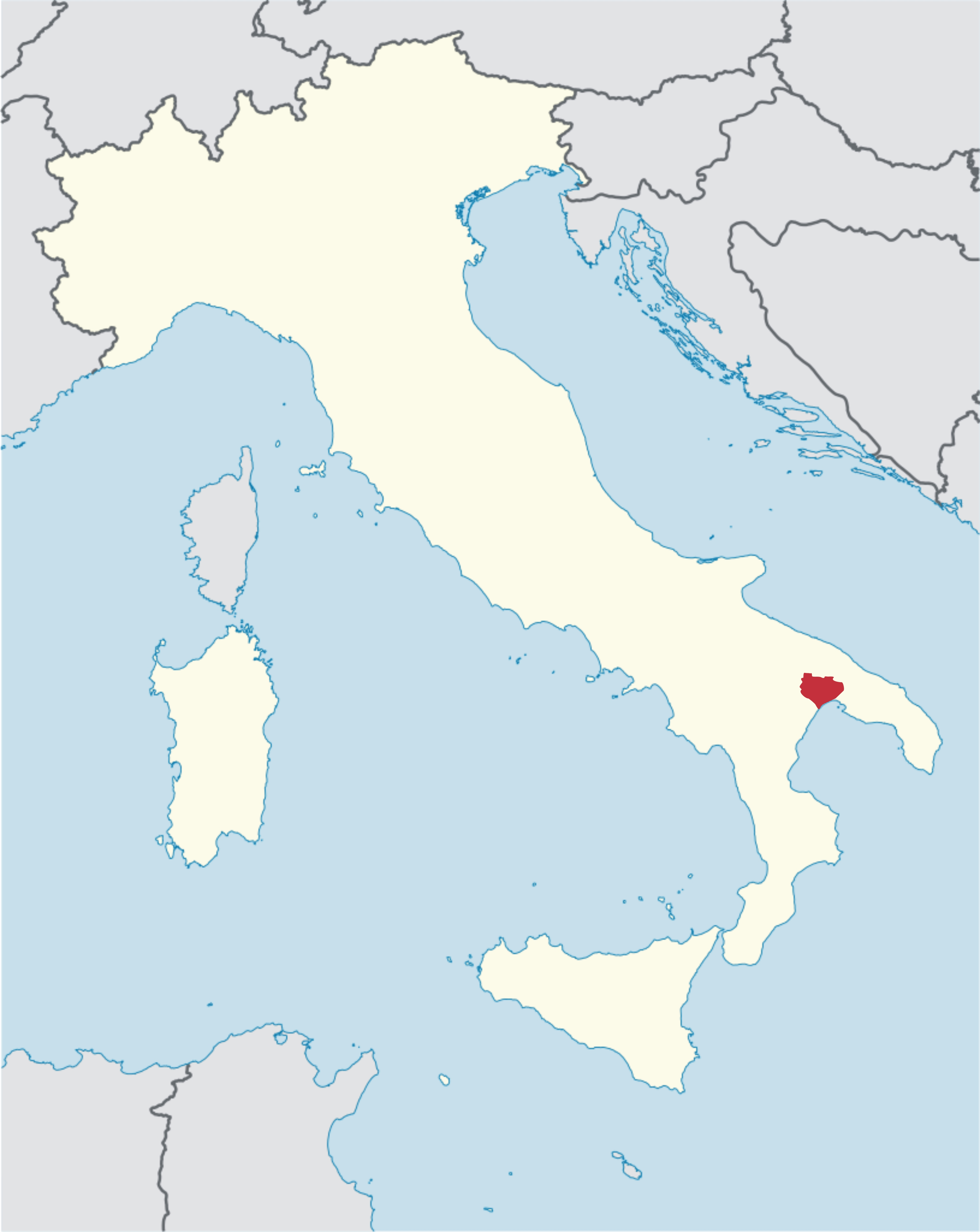

Website
- www.diocesicastellaneta.net

The Diocese of Castellaneta (Latin: Dioecesis Castellanetensis) is a Latin Church diocese of the Catholic Church in Apulia. It is a suffragan of the Archdiocese of Taranto.

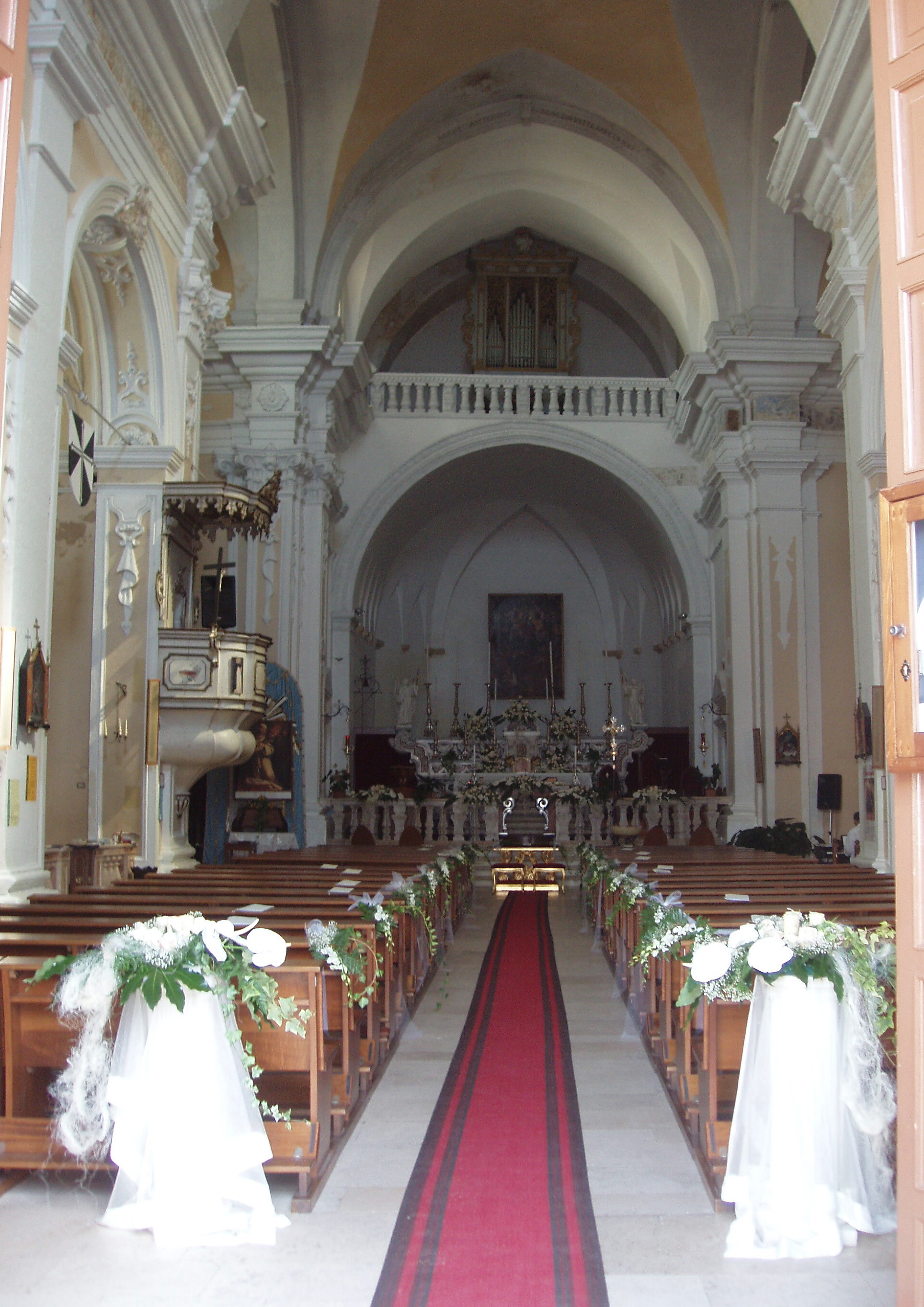
Interior of San Domenico, Castellaneta, set up for a wedding

== History ==
Nothing is known of Castellaneta before 1080, when it was taken by Robert, Duke of Tarentum, who expelled its Byzantine inhabitants. At this time, possibly, the episcopal see was created; in 1088 Tarentum was made a metropolitan see, and the diocese of Castellaneta was placed under his authority. In 1088 Riccardo the Seneschal, nephew of Robert Guiscard, who happened to be Lord of Castellaneta, granted to the diocese several monasteries and churches which were under his control. A bishop of Castellaneta, Joannes, is mentioned by Ferdinando Ughelli as first bishop of the diocese in 1088, but without documentation.

In December 1100, Amuris, Bishop of Mottola and Castellaneta, who had been given the Church of Castellaneta to rule by Archbishop Alberto of Taranto, granted the Church of S. Matteo Apostolo to the monastery of Cava, with the permission of Duke Roger and Riccardo Siniscalco. Mottola is only six miles east of Castellaneta. It appears that the diocese of Castellaneta was vacant, and that the Archbishop had assigned its administration to Amuris; the alternative theory is that Archbishop Amuris united the two dioceses, but such an action is a papal function. There is a record of an otherwise unknown Bishop of Mottola, who died in 1040; his successor was a certain Liberius.

== Bishops ==
=== to 1400 ===
- Angelus (attested 1181)
- Ignotus (attested 1195)
- Robertus (attested 1196)
- Sanctorus (attested January 1220)
- Marcus (by 1226 – 3 November 1242)
- Blasius (attested 1 July 1258 – 22 April 1279)
- Petrus, O.Cist. (1282)
- Ioannes, O.Min. (attested 1284, 1299)
- Bernardus (Bohemundus) (attested 1300)
- Angelus (attested 1328)
- Theobaldus (1331–1342)
- Petrus de Baia (4 February 1344 – 1367?)
- Thomas of Sulmona, O.P. (16 August 1367 – ? )
- Benedictus Andrighelli (c. 1378 ? – ? ) (Roman Obedience)
- Bartholomaeus de Senis (16 November 1386 – ) (Roman Obedience)
- Benedictus de Ascoli, O.E.S.A. (attested 1396)

=== from 1400 to 1600 ===
- Robertus de Gratiano (6 September 1409 – 1418)
- Franciscus Archamoni (14 November 1418 – 1424)
- Bartholomaeus Stephani (27 October 1424 – 1431)
- Gregorius Restii (Recii) de Gravina (19 November 1431 – 1454)
- Eustachius (29 March 1454 – )
- Giovanni Francesco Orsini (31 January 1477 – ?)
- Antonius de Pyrro (19 March 1494 – 8 October 1492)
- Antonius Galeghi (Galieto), O.E.S.A. (21 November 1496 – 1513)
- Marcus Antonius Pheoldi (6 April 1513 – 1536)
- Joannes Petrus Santorii (14 July 1536 – 1536)
- Bartholomaeus Siringi (the elder) (6 November 1536 – 17 March 1544)
- Bartholomaeus Siringi (the younger) (17 March 1544 – 1577)
- Joannes Aloysius de Benedictis (24 May 1577 – 28 January 1585)
- Bernardus de Benedictis (28 January 1585 – 1607)

=== from 1600 to 1800 ===
- Aureolus Averardi (7 November 1609 – 1617)
- Antonio Mattei (12 February 1618 – 1635)
- Ascensio Guerreri (7 May 1635 – 1645)
- Angelo Melchiori (31 July 1645 – 1650)
- Carlo Antonio Agudio (21 November 1650 – 1673)
- Carlo Falconi (bishop) (13 March 1673 – January 1677)
- Domenico Antonio Bernardini (26 April 1677 – 18 June 1696)
- Onuphrio Montesoro (17 December 1696 – 24 December 1722)
- Bonaventura Blasi, O.F.M.Conv. (11 September 1724 – March 1733)
- Maxentius Filo 11 May 1733 – September 1763)
- Leonardo Vitetta (20 February 1764 – 1788)
- Joachim Vassetta, Cong.Cl.S.P. (27 December 1792 – 1793)
- Vincenzo Maria Castro (18 December 1797 – 9 October 1800)

=== since 1800 ===
- Salvatore Lettieri (6 April 1818 – 27 June 1825)
- Pietro Lepore (9 April 1827 – 26 June 1851)
- Bartolomeo d’Avanzo (18 March 1852 – 13 July 1860)
- Mariano Positano (21 March 1873 – 13 May 1880)
- Gaetano Bacile di Castiglione (20 August 1880 – 14 May 1886)
- Giocondo (Matthaeus) de Nittis, O.F.M. (7 June 1886 – 28 February 1908)
- Federico de Martino (30 November 1908 – 26 August 1909)
- Nicola Riezzo (25 March 1958 – 28 April 1969)

...

- Martino Scarafile (1985–2003)
- Claudio Maniago (12 July 2014 – 29 November 2021)
- Sabino Iannuzzi, O.F.M. (from 5 March 2022)

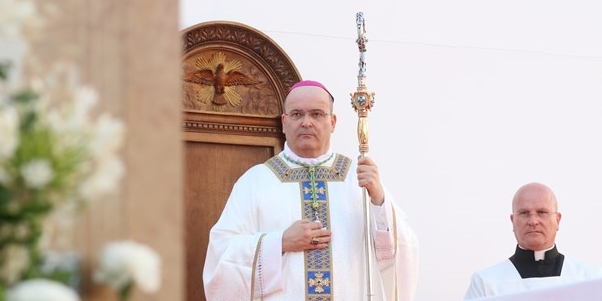
The current ordinary, Sabino Iannuzzi

== See also ==
- List of Catholic dioceses in Italy

== Books ==
=== Reference Works ===
- Eubel, Conradus, ed. (1913). Hierarchia catholica, Tomus 1 (second ed.). Münster: Libreria Regensbergiana. (in Latin)
- Eubel, Conradus, ed. (1914). Hierarchia catholica, Tomus 2 (second ed.). Münster: Libreria Regensbergiana. (in Latin)
- Eubel, Conradus, ed. (1923). Hierarchia catholica, Tomus 3 (second ed.). Münster: Libreria Regensbergiana.
- Gams, Pius Bonifatius (1873). Series episcoporum Ecclesiae catholicae: quotquot innotuerunt a beato Petro apostolo. Ratisbon: Typis et Sumptibus Georgii Josephi Manz. pp. 946–947. (Use with caution; obsolete)
- Gauchat, Patritius (Patrice) (1935). Hierarchia catholica IV (1592-1667). Münster: Libraria Regensbergiana. (in Latin)
- Ritzler, Remigius; Sefrin, Pirminus (1952). Hierarchia catholica medii et recentis aevi V (1667-1730). Patavii: Messagero di S. Antonio. (in Latin)
- Ritzler, Remigius; Sefrin, Pirminus (1958). Hierarchia catholica medii et recentis aevi VI (1730-1799). Patavii: Messagero di S. Antonio. (in Latin)
- Ritzler, Remigius; Sefrin, Pirminus (1968). Hierarchia Catholica medii et recentioris aevi sive summorum pontificum, S. R. E. cardinalium, ecclesiarum antistitum series... A pontificatu Pii PP. VII (1800) usque ad pontificatum Gregorii PP. XVI (1846) (in Latin). Vol. VII. Monasterii: Libr. Regensburgiana.
- Ritzler, Remigius; Pirminus Sefrin (1978). Hierarchia catholica Medii et recentioris aevi... A Pontificatu PII PP. IX (1846) usque ad Pontificatum Leonis PP. XIII (1903) (in Latin). Vol. VIII. Il Messaggero di S. Antonio.
- Pięta, Zenon (2002). Hierarchia catholica medii et recentioris aevi... A pontificatu Pii PP. X (1903) usque ad pontificatum Benedictii PP. XV (1922) (in Latin). Vol. IX. Padua: Messagero di San Antonio. ISBN 978-88-250-1000-8.

=== Studies ===
- Avino, Vincenzio d' (1848). Cenni storici sulle chiese arcivescovili, vescovili, e prelatizie (nullius) del regno delle due Sicilie (in Italian). Naples: dalle stampe di Ranucci. pp. 168–171.
- Benigni, Umberto. "Castellaneta (Castania)." The Catholic Encyclopedia. Vol. 3. (New York: Robert Appleton Company, 1908). Retrieved: 7 December 2022.
- Cappelletti, Giuseppe (1870). Le chiese d'Italia dalla loro origine sino ai nostri giorni (in Italian). Vol. vigesimoprimo (21). Venezia: Antonelli. pp. 141–144.
- Kamp, Norbert (1975). Kirche und Monarchie im staufischen Königreich Sizilien: I. Prosopographische Grundlegung, Bistumer und Bistümer und Bischöfe des Konigreichs 1194–1266: 2. Apulien und Calabrien München: Wilhelm Fink 1975, pp. 707–709.
- Lanzoni, Francesco (1927). Le diocesi d'Italia dalle origini al principio del secolo VII (an. 604) (in Italian). Rome: Biblioteca Apostolica Vaticana. pp. 644–650.
- Ughelli, Ferdinando; Coleti, Niccolo (1721). Italia Sacra Sive De Episcopis Italiae, Et Insularum adiacentium (in Latin). Vol. Tomus nonus (9). Venice: Antonio Coleti.
