= San Teodoro, Rome =

Church of Saint Theodore on the Palatine
- San Teodoro al Palatino (in Italian)
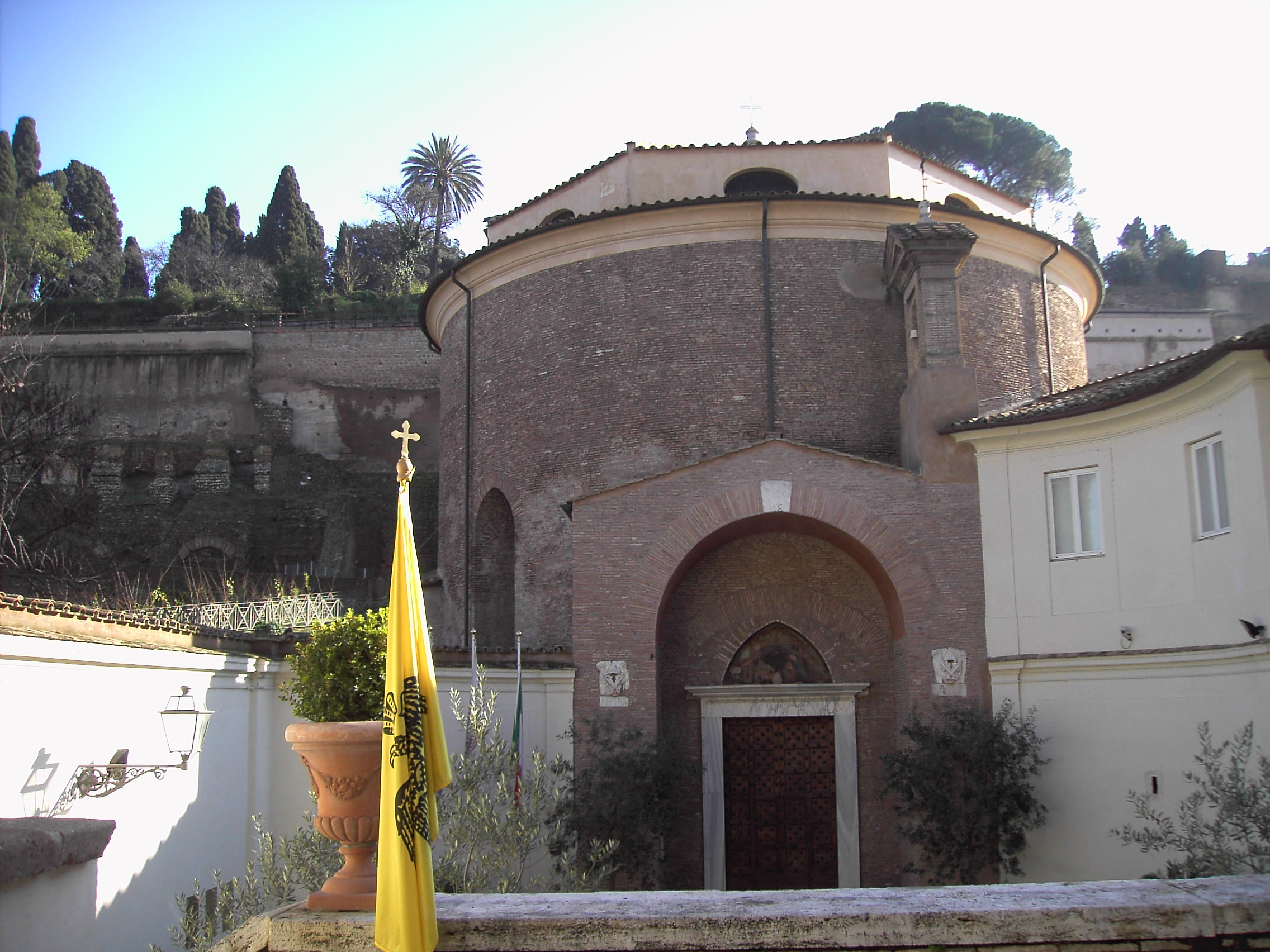
- Entrance to the church.
- Click on the map for a fullscreen view
- 41°53′25.6″N 12°29′5.2″E
- Location: Via San Teodoro 7, Rome
- Country: Italy
- Denomination: Greek Orthodox
- Tradition: Byzantine Rite
- Website: chiesaortodossa-roma.org

History
- Status: national church
- Dedication: Theodore of Amasea

Architecture
- Architect(s): Carlo Fontana, Francesco Barberini
- Architectural type: Church
- Style: Paleochristian
- Groundbreaking: 6th century
- Completed: 15th century

San Teodoro (Italian for "Saint Theodore"), informally known as San Toto, is an early medieval church in Rome dedicated to the martyr and warrior saint Theodore of Amasea. Its use was given to the Eastern Orthodox community of Rome by Pope John Paul II in 2004.

== History ==
=== Antiquity ===
The church is located at the northwest foot of the Palatine Hill along the ancient road between Rome's main forum and the Forum Boarium. It may have been erected over the ruins of the granaries of Agrippa or repurposed a former temple of Juno Sospita in the area. The latter is suggested by its unusual round shape, which resembles the well-preserved nymphaeum once identified as the Temple of Minerva Medica. An ancient pagan altar was located in the atrium before the church.

=== Catholic church ===
The cult of St Theodore was prominent and widespread by the end of the 4th century and a mosaic including Theodore was erected at SS Cosmas and Damian c. 530. San Teodoro may have been built as early as the 6th century as well. Its apsis mosaic dates to the 6th century and shows Christ in a black robe with gold lati clavi, which on Roman garments indicated high rank, seated on an orb representing the heavens and flanked by Peter and Paul and by the two martyrs Theodore (a later addition, from Nicholas V's restoration) and Cleonicus.

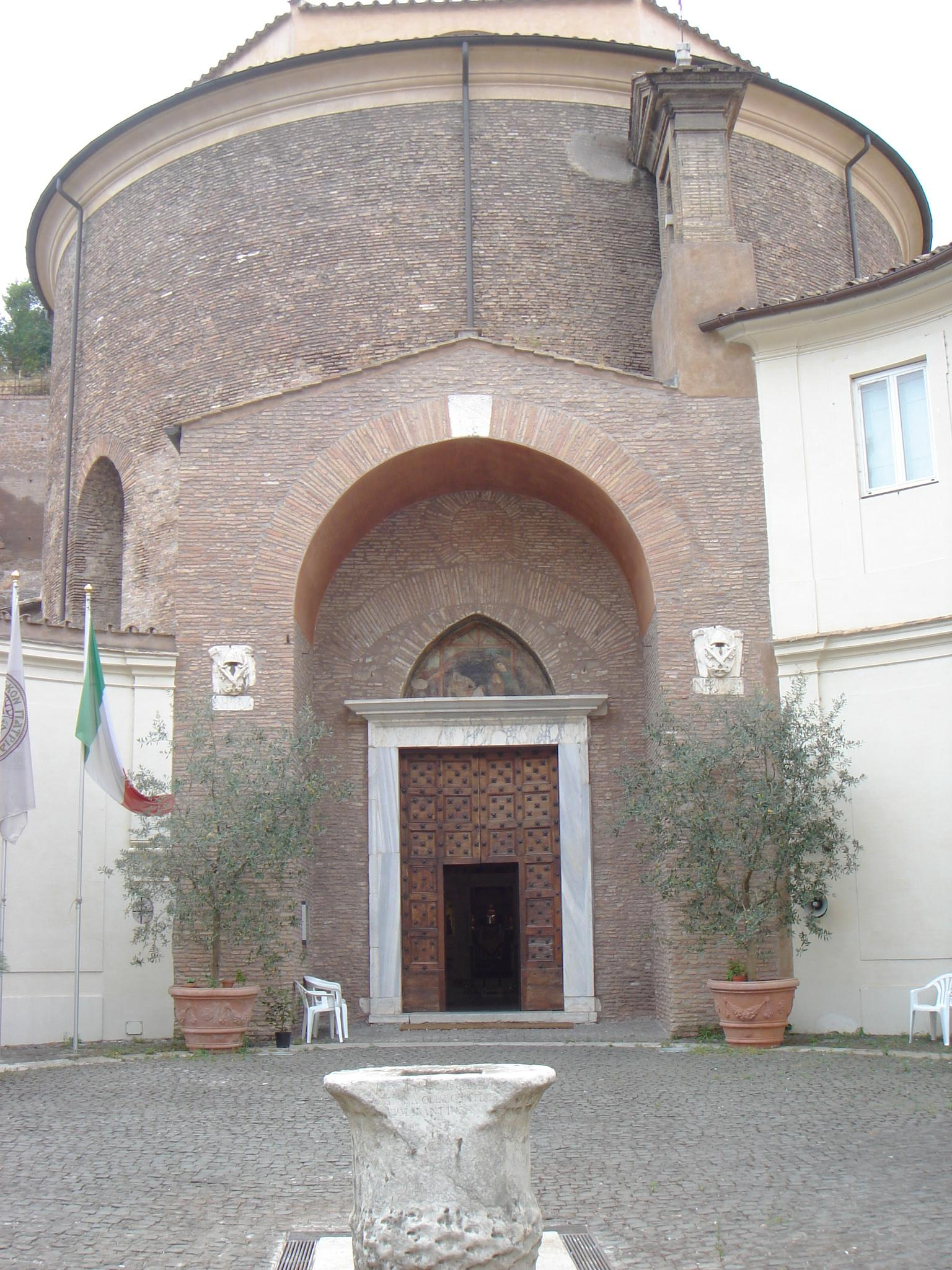
Close up view

The church is also traditionally one of the seven original deaconries in Rome, being assigned to a deacon by Pope Agatho (c. 678), though the first titular deacon known by name was Roberto, who lived around 1073 and died before 1099.

There is no definitive evidence of the church's existence before the 9th century. As the dedication to an eastern saint suggests, this places it in a period of strong Byzantine influence in Rome. It was rebuilt under Pope Nicholas V, had its long-held titular church status suppressed by Pope Sixtus V, was renovated by Francesco Barberini in 1643, and rebuilt by architect Carlo Fontana in 1703–1705 for Pope Clement XI who gave it to the Society of the Sacred Heart of Jesus.

Its titulus was reestablished on 2 December 1959 by Pope John XXIII, with William Theodore Heard (1959–1970, pro hac vice presbyterial titular 1970–1973). The last titular of the church was Vincenzo Fagiolo, who died on 22 September 2000.

=== Orthodox church ===
Pope John Paul II announced in November 2000 that he was granting the Ecumenical Patriarchate of Constantinople and the Greek Orthodox community in Rome use of the church, with the official inauguration taking place on 1 July 2004, presided over by Ecumenical Patriarch Bartholomew I of Constantinople.

== Interior ==
At the back of the atrium, outside the church, is an ossuary with stacked skulls and bones, visible through a grille. The Capitoline Wolf was kept in this church until the 16th century. As a Greek Orthodox church, it now has an iconostasis, or icon screen, that separates the sanctuary from the main body of the church.

== List of Titular Cardinals ==
- Benedict (January - September 972) - later Pope Benedict VI
- Robert (around 1073 - 1099)
- Bobone (1099 - around 1117)
- Errico, O.S.B. (around 1117-?)
- Gualtiero (1120- end 1121 or in all cases before 1125)
- Ugo Hieramea (or Geremei) (1125 - around 1129)
- Matteo (1129- about 1130)
- Alberto Teodoli (1130 - around 1155)
- Ardicio Rivoltella (1155-1186)
- Ugo Geremei (1186 - about 1188)
- Giovanni Malabranca (1188 - 1192)
- Bobo of San Teodoro, 1193 - 1199
- Gregorio Crescenzi (1205 - 1230)
- Vacant, 1230 - 1316
- Giovanni Gaetano Orsini (17 December 1316 - 27 August 1335)
- Vacant, 1335 - 1468
- Teodoro Paleologo di Montferrato (27 April 1468 - 21 January 1484)
- Vacant, 1484 - 1492
- Federico di Sanseverino (26 July 1492 - 1 May 1510, in commendation 1 May 1510 - 17 May 1511)
- Alfonso Petrucci (17 May 1511 - 22 June 1517)
- Francesco Pisani (22 October 1518 - 3 May 1527)
- Niccolò Gaddi (3 May 1527 - 9 January 1545)
- Andrea Cornaro (9 January 1545 - 27 June 1550)
- Luigi Cornaro (4 December 1551 - 26 February 1561), titre pro illa vice 26 February 1561 - 21 June 1564)
- Tolomeo Gallio, pro illa vice (15 May 1565 - 7 September 1565)
- Stanislaus Hosius, pro illa vice (7 September 1565 - 10 February 1570)
- Giulio Acquaviva of Aragon (6 September 1570 - 21 July 1574)
- Deaconry suppressed (1587-1959)
- William Theodore Heard (17 December 1959 - 18 May 1970); pro illa vice (18 May 1970 - 16 September 1973)
- Vacant (1973-1979)
- Ernesto Civardi (30 June 1979 - 28 November 1989)
- Vacant (1989-1994)
- Vincenzo Fagiolo (26 November 1994 - 22 September 2000)
- Vacant (2000-2004)
- Deaconry suppressed in 2004

== See also ==
- Late medieval domes
- Italian Renaissance domes
