= Ardicio Rivoltella =

Italian Cardinal

Cardinal Ardicio
- Cardinal-Deacon
- Church: San Teodoro (1156-1186)

Orders
- Created cardinal: 21 December 1156 by Pope Hadrian IV
- Rank: Cardinal Deacon

Personal details
- Born: Platina (Piadena)
- Died: 1186
- Residence: Rome
- Occupation: diplomat, administrator
- Profession: cleric

Ardicio de Rivoltela (died c. 1186) was a cardinal of the Roman Catholic Church. He was a native of Piadena (Platina), in the diocese of Cremona in Lombardy. The appellation "de Rivoltela" is mentioned only once, and its significance is unclear.

== Life ==
Under Pope Eugenius III (1145–1153), Ardicio is found as a subdeacon of the Holy Roman Church, where he is examining the case between the Bishop of Bologna and the Abbot of Padua over the decima tax, and charges of calumny.

Ardicio was named a cardinal by Pope Hadrian IV on 21 December 1156. His earliest signature as a cardinal on a papal document took place on 4 January 1157. He subscribed again, at the Lateran, on 5 April 1157, 13 May 1157, 18 May 1157, 21 May 1157, and 3 June 1157. He subscribed at Anagni on 11 September 1157. In 1158, he subscribed at St. Peter's on 10 January.

In 1158, Cardinal Ardicio and Cardinal Odo of Brescia were sent as papal legates to Lombardy, to attempt to arrange a peace between the cities of Milan and Lodi. The former was an opponent of the emperor, the latter a partisan. They failed.

Cardinal Ardicio subscribed a bull for Pope Adrian on 24 June 1159 at Palestrina (?), and on 28 June at Anagni.

=== Schism ===
Pope Adrian died at Anagni on 1 September 1159. Before he died, however, he held a meeting with the cardinals who supported King William I of Sicily, in opposition to Frederick Barbarossa. In the papal presence, the cardinals swore under oath that they would hold Frederick under the ban of excommunication and that from that time forward, even to death, they would oppose him; when it should happen that the pope died, they swore to elect no successor except from among those who had sworn the oath. After the pope died, while the cardinals were still in Anagni, they apparently made a pact not to finalize an election without a general consensus.

When the electoral process began in St. Peter's Basilica on Saturday, 5 September 1159, three cardinal bishops named Rolando, two named Ottaviano, and one supported neither. The fourteen cardinals who had taken the oath, including Ardicio supported Cardinal Rolando Bandinelli of S. Marco, who had been Pope Adrian's Chancellor. Nine cardinals, less than one-third, stood with Cardinal Ottaviano de' Monticelli of S. Cecilia, the friend of the Emperor Frederick and the imperial candidate. The other seven supported neither. There was a stalemate, which lasted through three days of intense discussion. During these discussions, a number of cardinals decided to change their votes: some of the seven cardinals who were in neither the imperial faction nor the chancellor's faction, but who had been supporting Bernard, the cardinal bishop of Porto, went over to Rolando. With a majority, and no hope of a consensus, the cardinals enthroned Rolando as Pope Alexander III, which induced the imperial faction, with military support, to uncanonically proclaim Ottaviano as Victor IV. The resulting schism lasted two decades.

=== Reign of Alexander III ===
In October 1159, following the beginning of the schism of Victor IV (Octavianus de' Monticelli), Cardinal Ardicio was one of the signatories of a letter of the cardinals to the Emperor Frederick Barbarossa, supporting Pope Alexander III and denouncing Octavian as a schismatic. On 15 October, Ardicio subscribed a bull of Alexander III in favor of the church of the Holy Sepulchre in Jerusalem. At the beginning of spring 1160, he was sent, along with Bishop Otho of Tivoli, to Constantinople to explain the circumstances of the papal election to Manuel I Komnenos, and to seek imperial support for Pope Alexander.

At the end of August 1162, Pope Alexander, who was staying at the Cluniac priory of Souvigny between Bourges and Clermont, held a face-to-face meeting with King Louis VII of France, but they were unable to agree on the holding of a conference between them. Alexander, moreover, was afraid of trickery on the part of the emperor and Henry II of England. Alexander then sent a delegation to the king, composed of Bishop Bernard of Porto, Cardinal Hubaldus of Santa Croce in Gerusalemme, Cardinal Joannes of S. Anastasia, Cardinal Jacinthus of S. Maria in Cosmedin, and Cardinal Ardicio of S. Teodoro. There mission was to explain to the king that the election of Alexander III was the canonical one. Instead, the king had a meeting with the antipope and the emperor at Dijon. Ardicio and his associates were back with the pope at Dol on 20 September; they then travelled to Clermont, and were at Tours on 5 November 1162.

In 1165, Cardinal Ardicio made a second voyage to Constantinople to ensure that the Emperor Manuel would support Pope Alexander. He subscribed a bull at Montpellier on 21 July 1165, and another on 27 July. Ardicio and the papal court were back in Rome on 23 November 1165, and Ardicio subscribed a bull at the Lateran in Rome on 18 March 1166.

For a time, between 1169 and 1173, he was papal legate, with Cardinal Manfred of Lavagna, and is attested at Como.

Ardicio and nine other cardinals were in Benevento on 24 July 1169, when they signed the bull which regulated the government of Benevento and addressed its shortcomings. In 1171, Ardicio was Rector of Benevento.

On 2 January 1179, Cardinal Ardicio was in Tusculum, where he signed a bull in favor of the monastery of Ss. Flora and Lucilla in Arezzo. He was in Rome in March 1179, and attended the Third Lateran Council of Pope Alexander III, which held its first plenary session on 5 March, its second on 7 March, and its third on 19 March. At the Lateran, he subscribed a papal bull on 6 March 1179, another on 20 March, and a third on 26 March. On 22 March 1179, Cardinal Ardicio presided over the case between the bishop of Cremona and the abbot of the monastery of S. Genesio Brixilense in Parma, and defined the boundaries of three disputed churches. He was at the Lateran again on 7 April 1179, to sign a bull in favor of the monastery of S. Nazario in Lorscheim.

=== Reign of Lucius III ===
Pope Alexander died on 30 August 1181, and the meeting to elect his successor took place on 1 September. Hubertus Allucingoli, bishop of Ostia and Velletri, was elected Pope Lucius III. Cardinal Ardicio was probably present, though there is no positive evidence to the fact.

In October 1182, Cardinal Ardicio is mentioned in a letter of Pope Lucius as holding a "prelacy" over the clerics of the church of Platina (Piadena), in consideration of his having built the church out of his own funds and established the clergy there.

In 1184, Pope Lucius III was expelled from Rome, after he took sides in the ongoing wars between the Roman commune and Tusculum. Having lost to the Romans, Lucius fled to the Emperor Frederick Barbarossa, who was at Verona, hoping to enlist his assistance. Some of the cardinals followed Pope Lucius to Verona; others, however, whose followers had perpetrated outrages at Tusculum and in the Roman campagna, remained in the city.

Ten cardinals who were with the pope in his journey north participated in the consecration of the cathedral of Modena on 14 July 1184. They were: Theodinus of Porto, Tebaldus of Ostia; Joannes of S. Marco, Laborans of S. Maria Transtiberim, Pandulfus of Ss. Apostolorum, Ubertus of S. Lorenzo in Damaso; Ardicio of S. Teodoro, Graziano of Ss. Cosma e Damiano, Goffredfus of S. Maria in Via Lata, and Albinus of S. Maria Nuova.

Ardicio was one of eighteen cardinals who subscribed a papal bull in Verona on 11 November 1185, two weeks before the pope's death.

Pope Lucius died on 25 November 1185. The meeting to elect his successor, given the threat posed by the emperor's siege, met on the same day and elected Hubertus of Milan, the cardinal-priest of San Lorenzo in Damaso as Pope Urban III. Cardinal Ardicio was probably present, though there is no positive evidence.

=== Reign of Urban III ===
Ardicio last subscribed a papal document on 13 March 1186. The papal court was still in Verona, trapped by the siege of Frederick Barbarossa, and did not escape until the last week of September 1187. Ardicio's successor at S. Teodoro, Johannes Malabranca, first subscribes on 16 March 1188, after a new pope, Clement III had returned to Rome.

== Sources ==
- Brixius, Johannes Matthias (1912). Die Mitglieder des Kardinalkollegiums von 1130–1181. (in German) Berlin: R. Trenkel.
- Ciaconius (Chacón), Alphonsus (1677). Agostinus Olduinus (ed.). Vitae et res gestae pontificum romanorum: et S.R.E. cardinalium (in Latin). Vol. Tomus primus (2nd ed.). Roma: P. et A. De Rubeis. p. 1120.
- Ganzer, Klaus (1963). Die Entwicklung des auswärtigen Kardinalats im hohen Mittelalter. Ein Beitrag zur Geschichte des Kardinalkollegiums vom 11.bis 13. Jahrhundert. Bibliothek des Deutschen Historischen Instituts in Rom (in German). Tübingen: Max Niemeyer.
- Gregorovius, Ferdinand (1905). The History of Rome in the Middle Ages Vol. IV, part 2. 2nd ed. London: George Bell 1905.
- Jaffé, Philipp (1888). Regesta pontificum Romanorum ab condita Ecclesia ad annum post Christum natum MCXCVIII (in Latin). Vol. II. Leipzig.
- Janssen, Wilhelm (1961). Die päpstlichen Legaten in Frankreich von Schisma Anaklets II. bis zum Tode Coelestins III. (1130–1198). (in German) Köln 1961.
- Kartusch, Elfriede (1948). Das Kardinalskollegium in der Zeit von 1181–1227 (in German). Wien.
- Ohnsorge, Werner (1928). Die Legaten Alexanders III im ersten Jahrzehnt seines Pontifikats (1159—1169) [Historische Studien, 175] (in German) (Berlin, 1928).
- Watterich, J. B. M. (1862). Pontificum Romanorum qui fuerunt inde ab exeunte saeculo IX usque ad finem saeculi XIII vitae: ab aequalibus conscriptae (in Latin). Vol. Tomus II. Leipzig: G. Engelmann.
- Zenker, Barbara. Die Mitglieder des Kardinalcollegiums von 1130 bis 1159 (Würzburg 1964).
