= Ardoino da Piacenza =

Ardoino da Piacenza (died 21 January 1183) was an Italian cardinal. His first name is listed also as Arduino.

He was archdeacon of the cathedral chapter of Piacenza and member of the Order of Canons Regular di San Frediano di Lucca. Pope Alexander III created him Cardinal in the consistory celebrated in Frascati in 1178. Between 4 July and 6 September 1178, he signed a papal bull as Cardinal-Deacon of S. Maria in Via Lata, but shortly thereafter he was promoted to the rank of Cardinal-Priest of Santa Croce in Gerusalemme; as such, he signed the bulls from 1 October 1178, until 8 January 1183. He participated in the papal election, 1181, which elected Pope Lucius III. An opuscle titled De Deo immortali is sometimes misattributed to Arduin, but this is the result of a confusion with the work of Hugo Etherianus.

== Sources ==
- Gaetano Moroni, Dizionario di erudizione storico-ecclesiastica da S. Pietro sino ai nostri giorni vol. III, Tipografia Emiliana, Venice 1840-1861, page 13
- Philip Jaffé, Regesta pontificum Romanorum ab condita Ecclesia ad annum post Christum natum MCXCVIII, Berlin 1851, p. 678 and 835
- J. M. Brixius, Die Mitglieder des Kardinalkollegiums von 1130-1181, Berlin 1912, p. 60 no. 1
