= OFM =

OFM may refer to:

- Office of Foreign Missions, part of the US Department of State
- Officine Ferroviarie Meridionali, an Italian railway and rolling stock manufacturer
- OFM (South Africa), a radio station in Bloemfontein, South Africa
- Open flow microperfusion, a sampling method for clinical and preclinical drug development studies and biomarker research
- Office of the Fire Marshal of Ontario, a fire marshal office in Ontario, Canada
- Oracle Fusion Middleware, a company
- Orange Factory Music, a music production team
- Orthodox file manager, a text-menu based file manager

== Religion ==
- Order of Friars Minor, a Franciscan religious order
- Order of Friars Minor Capuchin, a Franciscan religious order
- Order of Friars Minor Conventual, a Franciscan religious order
