= John of Anagni =

Italian clergyman

Joannes Anagninus (Giovanni dei Conti di Anagni) (died 1196) was a cardinal of the Roman Catholic Church. He was a native of Anagni, and belonged to the family of the Counts of Anagni, the same family that produced Pope Innocent III. His colleagues called him, and he called himself "Joannes Anagninus". In 1191, he subscribed himself Joannes comes Anagninus, episcopus cardinalis Praenestinus. He was successively cardinal deacon of S. Maria in Portico, cardinal priest of S. Marco, and cardinal bishop of Palestrina.

== Schism ==
In the letter of the cardinals to the Emperor Frederick Barbarossa in October 1159, he is named as Jo(annes), a cardinal deacon, indicating that he was already a cardinal under Pope Adrian IV. Pope Adrian died on 1 September 1159, and the election of his successor produced a schism between the canonically elected Cardinal Rolando Bandinelli, the papal chancellor, who became Pope Alexander III on 7 September, and the minority candidate of the imperialist faction, Cardinal Ottaviano de'Monticelli, who took the name Victor IV. Victor had the support of the Emperor Frederick Barbarossa, at whose election he was present and whose friend he had become. Alexander was driven out of Rome by the leaders of the republican commune, the Roman nobility, and the lower clergy of Rome, backed by troops of the emperor, led by Count Palatine Otto von Wittelsbach, the imperial legate at the papal court.

Cardinal Joannes vigorously supported Alexander III in the schism. He was already at work at Piacenza in early February, when he was summoned to give testimony to the council called by the emperor and his antipope, a summons he ignored. On 28 March, he excommunicated Lodiocus, who was in Castello Baradello at Como. Fortunately, the antipope Victor died on 20 April 1164 at Lucca.

From 1162 to August 1165, Pope Alexander was in France.

Cardinal Joannes was promoted cardinal priest by Alexander III, at some point between July 1163 and 1164, and was assigned the titular church of San Marco. In 1164, probably, Pope Alexander sent an embassy to the Balkans, headed by Cardinal Giovanni Conti da Anagni of S. Marco, and including the subdeacons, Theodinus and Vitellius. Both subdeacons later became cardinals, as Pope Alexander's letter indicates. They were well-treated by Bishop Lazarus of Arbania. The purpose of their mission is not specified, but it undoubtedly included the continuing schism.

== Lucius III ==
In the spring of 1183, Cardinal Joannes of S. Marco, along with Bishop Petrus of Luni, was appointed to a legation to the Emperor. The purpose of their mission, at the emperor's request, was to regularize the status of clerics who had been degraded and deposed by Pope Alexander at the council of Venice in 1177. His latest subscription at the papal court was on 17 November 1182, and he was in Constance on 30 June 1183, where the emperor held a solemn assembly. At the completion of their mission, the cardinal and bishop visited Cologne. Cardinal Joannes had returned to the papal court at Anagni by 1 November 1183, where he subscribed a bull. He also subscribed a bull at Anagni on 15 December 1183.

Cardinal Joannes died in 1196.

== Sources ==
- Brixius, Johannes Matthias (1912). Die Mitglieder des Kardinalkollegiums von 1130–1181. (in German) Berlin: R. Trenkel.
- Ciaconius (Chacón), Alphonsus (1677). Agostinus Olduinus (ed.). Vitae et res gestae pontificum romanorum: et S.R.E. cardinalium (in Latin). Vol. Tomus primus (2nd ed.). Roma: P. et A. De Rubeis. pp. 1118–1119.
- Gregorovius, Ferdinand (1896), History of Rome in the Middle Ages. Volume IV. part 2, second edition (London: George Bell, 1896).
- Jaffé, Philipp (1888). Regesta pontificum Romanorum ab condita Ecclesia ad annum post Christum natum MCXCVIII (in Latin). Vol. II. Leipzig.
- Kartusch, Elfriede (1948). Das Kardinalskollegium in der Zeit von 1181–1227 (in German). Wien.
- Watterich, J. B. M. (1862). Pontificum Romanorum qui fuerunt inde ab exeunte saeculo IX usque ad finem saeculi XIII vitae: ab aequalibus conscriptae (in Latin). Vol. Tomus II. Leipzig: G. Engelmann.
