= Theodinus =

Roman Catholic Cardinal

Theodinus, O.S.B. (died c. 1186) was a Benedictine monk, and a cardinal of the Roman Catholic Church. He was a native of Arrone, a hilltop town 15 km east of Terni. He became a cardinal priest, and then cardinal bishop of Porto. He served as a papal diplomat, in Normandy, in the Balkans, and in Venice. He participated in the papal elections of 1181 and 1185.

== Early career ==
Theodinus entered the religious life at the Benedictine monastery of St. Benedict de Padolyrone, in the territory of Mantua.

In early Spring 1163, the subdeacon of the Holy Roman Church, Theodinus, carried the summonses of Pope Alexander III to the council of Tours to England. He obtained permission of King Henry II of England for all the archbishops, bishops, and abbots of England to attend. Only three bishops were unable to answer the summons.

In 1164, probably, the subdeacon Theodinus was again sent, this time into the Balkans, on an embassy headed by Cardinal Giovanni Conti da Anagni of S. Marco, and including another subdeacon, Vitellius. Both subdeacons later became cardinals, as Pope Alexander's letter indicates. They were well-treated by Bishop Lazarus of Arbania. The purpose of their mission is not specified, but it undoubtedly included the continuing schism.

== Cardinal ==
In 1166, probably in the Lenten Ember Days, he was named a cardinal by Pope Alexander III. Johannes Brixius states that he was named Cardinal Priest of the titular church of S. Vestina. Elfriede Kartusch, however, states that he was first made Cardinal Deacon of the deaconry of S. Maria in Porticu, and then, by 16 April 1166, Cardinal priest of S. Vestina.

In 1172, Cardinal Theodinus was sent with the papal chancellor, Cardinal Alberto di Morra, to Normandy to receive the submission and impart the absolution of King Henry II of England because of his part in the murder of Archbishop Thomas Becket. They were in Normandy by March, but the king was completing his conquest of Ireland. They finally met at Savigny on 17 May 1172, but Henry was not prepared to meet the demands of Pope Alexander which the legates presented. They met the king and his son Henry at Avranches on 21 May, and, on 27 September, the king took his oath of purgation in the hands of Cardinal Alberto.

In October 1173, Theodinus and Cardinal Hildebrandus Grassi took part in the meeting of the Lombard League in Mantua. The Lombard League dramatically defeated the Emperor Frederick Barbarossa at the Battle of Legnano on 29 May 1176.

From March to October 1177, the papal court was in Venice for the purpose of negotiating a settlement in the differences between the Empire and the Church. In April 1177, Theodinus was one of seven cardinals appointed by Alexander III to conduct the negotiations with Frederick Barbarossa.

On 6 March 1179, Cardinal Theodinus was at the Lateran, and subscribed a bull for Pope Alexander III. The Third Lateran Council had held its opening session on the previous day, and there is no doubt that Theodinus attended its sessions throughout March.

In April or May 1179, probably in the Pentecost Ember Days, Theodinus was named cardinal bishop of Porto and Santa Rufina by Pope Alexander. His latest subscription as cardinal priest took place on 25 April 1179, and his earliest subscription with his new title took place on 4 May 1179.

In June 1179, Cardinal Theodinus was acting as a judicial procurator for Alexander III in the pope's legal actions to recover territory, property, and damages from members of the Frangipani family with regard to Olibano, Ancarano, Piperno, Cisterna, Columpna, Cornaczano and Fusignano.

Pope Alexander III died on 30 April 1181 at Cività Castellana.

== Lucius III ==
On the third day after the pope's death, the cardinals met and elected the senior member of the Sacred College, Cardinal Ubaldo of Lucca, Bishop of Ostia. He took the name Lucius III. On September 6, 1181 he was crowned by Cardinal Theodinus of Porto, the senior cardinal bishop after the election of the bishop of Ostia, at Velletri.

In 1184, Pope Lucius III was expelled from Rome, after he took sides in the ongoing wars between the Roman commune and Tusculum. Having lost to the Romans, Lucius fled to the Emperor Frederick Barbarossa, who was at Verona, hoping to enlist his assistance. Some of the cardinals followed Pope Lucius to Verona; others, however, whose followers had perpetrated outrages at Tusculum and in the Roman campagna, remained in the city.

== Verona ==
Ten cardinals who were with the pope in his journey north participated in the consecration of the cathedral of Modena on 14 July 1184. They were: Theodinus of Porto, Tebaldus of Ostia; Joannes of S. Marco, Laborans of S. Maria Transtiberim, Pandulfus of Ss. Apostolorum, Ubertus of S. Lorenzo in Damaso; Ardicio of S. Teodoro, Graziano of Ss. Cosma e Damiano, Goffredfus of S. Maria in Via Lata, and Albinus of S. Maria Nuova.

In Verona, on 11 November 1185, two weeks before Pope Lucius's death, eighteen cardinals, including Theodinus, subscribed a bull in favor of the monastery of S. Peter Lobiensis. This was the last day on which bulls were signed before the pope's death. Pope Lucius III died at Verona on 25 November 1185. On that same day, eighteen cardinals started proceedings to elect his successor. The anti-imperial cardinals, including Theodinus, quickly secured the election of their candidate, the cardinal archbishop of Milan, Uberto Crivelli. Crivelli was widely known to have a long-standing rancor against Barbarossa, who had singled out his family and followers when he had conquered Milan, some of whom he ordered to be executed, others to be mutilated.

Cardinal Theodinus subscribed a bull for Pope Urban III on 9 December 1185.

Cardinal Theodinus' latest subscription to a papal document took place on 13 March 1186 in Verona.

== Sources ==
- Brixius, Johannes Matthias (1912). Die Mitglieder des Kardinalkollegiums von 1130–1181. (in German) Berlin: R. Trenkel.
- Ciaconius (Chacón), Alphonsus (1677). Agostinus Olduinus (ed.). Vitae et res gestae pontificum romanorum: et S.R.E. cardinalium (in Latin). Vol. Tomus primus (2nd ed.). Roma: P. et A. De Rubeis. pp. 1088–1089.
- Gregorovius, Ferdinand (1896), History of Rome in the Middle Ages. Volume IV. part 2, second edition (London: George Bell, 1896).
- Jaffé, Philipp (1888). Regesta pontificum Romanorum ab condita Ecclesia ad annum post Christum natum MCXCVIII (in Latin). Vol. II. Leipzig.
- Kartusch, Elfriede (1948). Das Kardinalskollegium in der Zeit von 1181–1227 (in German). Wien.
- Watterich, J. B. M. (1862). Pontificum Romanorum qui fuerunt inde ab exeunte saeculo IX usque ad finem saeculi XIII vitae: ab aequalibus conscriptae (in Latin). Vol. Tomus II. Leipzig: G. Engelmann.
