= Pietro de Bono =

Italian cardinal

Cardinal Petrus de Bono, C.R.
- Cardinal-Priest
- Church: Santa Susanna (1173-1187)
- Predecessor: Lesbio Grassi
- Successor: Alessio
- Other post: Cardinal Deacon of Santa Maria in Aquiro (1166-1173)

Orders
- Created cardinal: March 1166 (Deacon); 21 September 1173 by Pope Alexander III
- Rank: Cardinal Priest

Personal details
- Born: Verona
- Died: 1187 Rome
- Buried: S. Maria de Reno, Bologna (?)
- Residence: Rome, Velletri, Verona
- Occupation: courtier
- Profession: priest, canon

Pietro de Bono (Petrus de Bono, C.R.) (died 20 November 1187) was a cardinal of the Roman Catholic Church. He was a native of Verona in Lombardy, signing his name at least once as D. Petri de Verona. He was not from Pisa, nor was he from Bologna. He belonged to the Canons Regular of S. Maria di Reno in Bologna. An early seventeenth-century family history, however, identifies him as a member of the House of Rusca of Como, son of Giovanni Rusca, citing a notarial deed of 1147 and calling him "Pietro Rusca detto il Buono." This claim has not been assessed by modern scholarship and should be treated with appropriate caution, given the genealogical and celebratory character of the source; it nonetheless predates, and is independent of, the Verona attribution, which itself rests on a single later signature.

== Alexander III ==
He was named a cardinal by Pope Alexander III in the Lenten Ember Days of 1166, and assigned the deaconry of Santa Maria in Aquiro in Rome.

At Anagni, on 8 April 1173, Cardinal Petrus of S. Maria in Aquiro subscribed a bull in favor of Abbot Giraldus of S. Maria de Belloloco; and on 8 June for Abbot Geminianus of S. Pietro in Modena.

On 21 September 1173, at Anagni, he was promoted cardinal priest of the titular church of Santa Susanna. He subscribed a papal bull as Petrus of S. Susanna on 28 September. Ciaconius-Olduin states that after Petrus was made a cardinal deacon, and then cardinal priest, he was sent on a legation with Cardinal Manfred of S. Georgio ad velabrum to King William I of Sicily, to beg him to bring military aid to the pope against the emperor. Kartusch, however, citing only Ciaconius-Olduin, sends Petrus and Manfred to Scotland to King William the Lion, "before 1177".

On 4 March 1174, again at Anagni, he subscribed a bull of Alexander III for Archbishop Alfano of Capua. On 29 May 1176, he and Cardinal Rainerius of S. Giorgio ad velum aureum were procurators for Pope ALexander in a private lawsuit seeking to recover money.

Cardinal Petrus of Santa Susanna was in Anagni on 20 April 1176, where he signed a bull of Pope Alexander in favor of the Vallombrosian monastery. On 30 April, he subscribed again for the monastery of S. Maria de Florentia.

He subscribed again on 22 June, 7 July, 2 September, 15 November, and on 31 December 1176. In January 1177 the papal court was on the move, to Benevento, Siponto, and Foggia. In Foggia, Cardinal Petrus subscribed a bull at the end of January.

Cardinal Petrus de Bono was with the papal court in Venice from March to October 1177. The papal entourage paid a visit to Ferrara from 10 April to 9 May 1177. On 27 April he subscribed a bull in Ferrara. Cardinal Petrus was one of the seven cardinals appointed by Pope Alexander III in April to negotiate a peace between Frederick Barbarossa and the Papacy. In Venice, he subscribed a bull on 6 August 1177, and on 6 September 1177.

== Lucius III ==
Cardinal Petrus de Bono signed documents for Pope Lucius from 28 September 1181 to 13 May 1184 (at Veroli). He was not one of the ten cardinals who accompanied Lucius III on his journey to Verona in June 1184, to seek imperial aid in the war between Tusculum and the Roman commune. He does not subscribe at all for him from 13 May 1184 until Lucius' death in Verona on 25 November 1185.

== Urban III ==
The election of Lucius' successor was held on the next day. It was brief and unanimous. The successful candidate was Humbertus Crivelli, the Archbishop of Milan and Cardinal of S. Lorenzo in Damaso, " a violent and unyielding spirit, and a strong opponent of Frederick (Barbarossa)," in the words of Ferdinand Gregorovius. He took the name Urban III, and maintained all of the uncompromising policies of Lucius III. He and the papal court continued as virtual prisoners in Verona. There is no indication that Cardinal Pietro de Bono took part in Urban's election, despite the assurances of Lorenzo Cardella that he did. Notably, Cardella's claim was anticipated by nearly two centuries in Roberto Rusca's 1610 family chronicle, which likewise asserts Pietro's presence at the 1185 election, citing an independent source (Tinto's ''Nobiltà di Verona''). Whether Cardella and Rusca drew on a shared earlier tradition, now lost, or whether this represents a persistent but unverifiable family/local legend, remains unclear. His earliest subscription for Urban III took place on 13 May 1186, six months after the papal election. Shortly after 22 September 1187, Urban and the cardinals escaped from Verona, and by 3 October had found refuge in Ferrara, where Urban died on 20 October.

== Gregory VIII ==
On the day following the death of Urban III, thirteen cardinals who had been present in Ferrara began the proceedings to elect his successor. The old papal chancellor Alberto di Morra was unanimously elected pope on 21 October 1187, and took the name Gregory VIII. It is likely, though there is no positive evidence, that Petrus de Bono was one of the electors.

Cardinal Petrus subscribed bulls for Pope Gregory VIII at Ferrara on 31 October 1187.

Cardinal Pietro died on 20 November 1187, by which date the papal entourage had moved from Ferrara to Bologna. Lorenzo Cardella reports, on the authority of Giovanni Nicolò Alidosi Pasquali, that he was buried at the monastery of S. Maria de Reno in Bologna, which is not unlikely.

== Sources ==
- Brixius, Johannes Matthias (1912). Die Mitglieder des Kardinalkollegiums von 1130–1181. (in German) Berlin: R. Trenkel.
- Ciaconius (Chacón), Alphonsus (1677). Agostinus Olduinus (ed.). Vitae et res gestae pontificum romanorum: et S.R.E. cardinalium (in Latin). Vol. Tomus primus (2nd ed.). Roma: P. et A. De Rubeis. pp. 1118–1119. first edition, 1601
- Gregorovius, Ferdinand (1896), History of Rome in the Middle Ages. Volume IV. part 2, second edition (London: George Bell, 1896).
- Jaffé, Philipp (1888). Regesta pontificum Romanorum ab condita Ecclesia ad annum post Christum natum MCXCVIII (in Latin). Vol. II. Leipzig.
- Kartusch, Elfriede (1948). Das Kardinalskollegium in der Zeit von 1181–1227 (in German). Wien.
