= Castellaneta =

Castellaneta Griko: Castanea
- Comune
- Città di Castellaneta
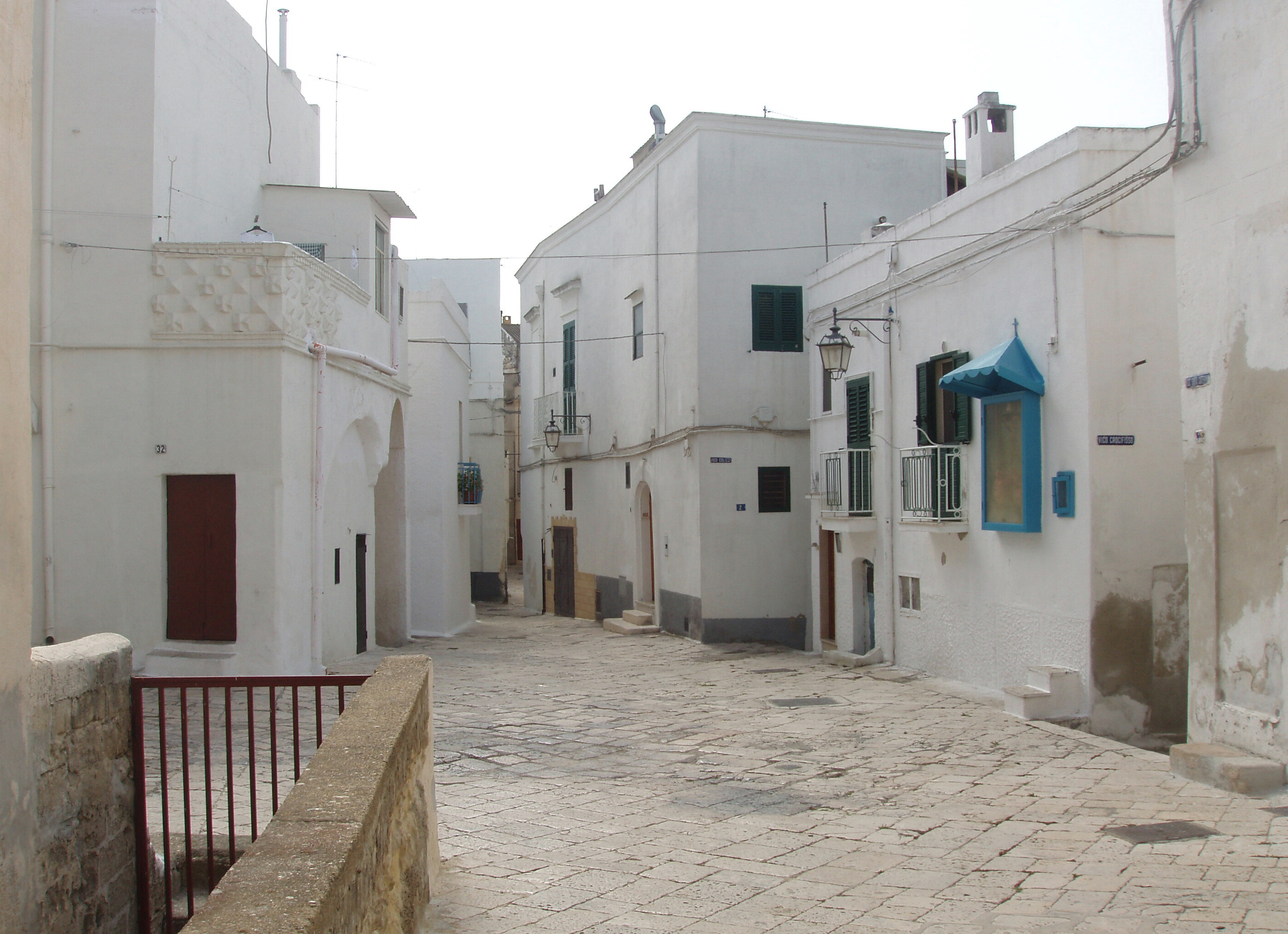
- View of the historical centre

- Location in Taranto Province

- Location within Italy Location within Apulia
- Coordinates: 40°38′N 16°56′E
- Country: Italy
- Region: Apulia
- Province: Taranto (TA)
- Frazioni: Castellaneta Marina, Gaudella

Area
  - Total: 242.32 km^{2} (93.56 sq mi)
- Elevation: 245 m (804 ft)

Population (31 December 2013)
  - Total: 17,069
  - Density: 70.440/km^{2} (182.44/sq mi)
- Demonym: Castellanetani
- Time zone: UTC+1 (CET)
  - Summer (DST): UTC+2 (CEST)
- Postal code: 74011
- Dialing code: 099
- Patron saint: St. Nicholas and St. Francis of Paola
- Saint day: December 8
- Website: Official website

Castellaneta (Tarantino: Castelanéte) is a city and comune in the province of Taranto in the Apulia region of Southern Italy, about 40 km (25 mi) from Taranto. Located in a territory spanning from the Murgia to the Ionian Sea, characterized by numerous gravina (ravines), it is part of the Comunità Montana della Murgia Tarantina (Tarentine Murgia Mountain Community).

== History ==
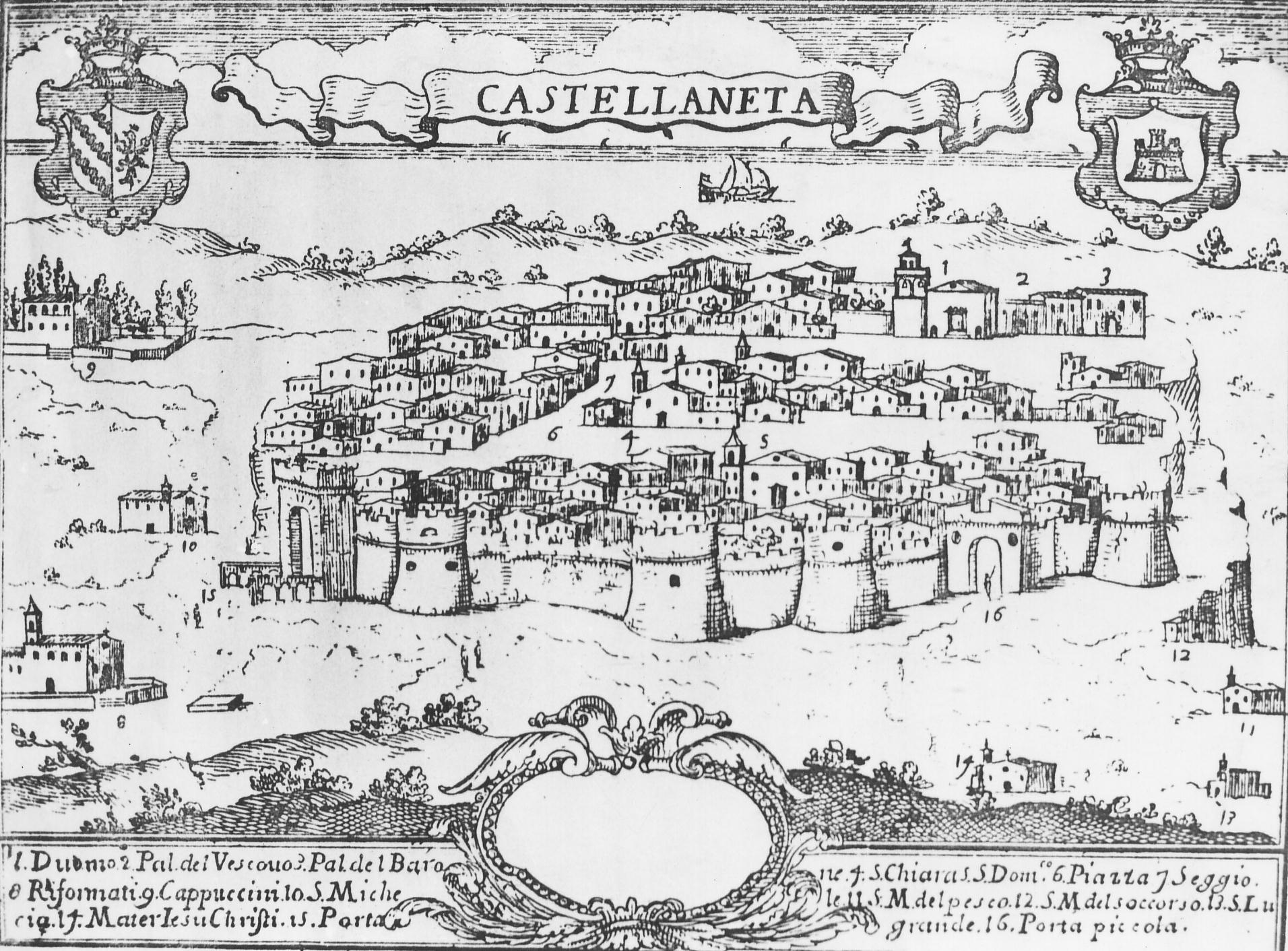
Castellaneta in the 18th century.

=== Antiquity ===
Human settlements were present in the area since the Bronze Age (3rd–2nd millennium BC), and it was later probably settled by Sicels, Messapii and Iapyges. According to a theory, a fortified city (Castania in Latin) was founded in 550 and grew in size when the population of neighbouring cities fled there from Saracen attacks. Other historians maintain instead that it was a Greek colony which existed until the 8th century. When the Saracens destroyed it, the inhabitants joined in a Castellum Unitum (United Castle) on the hills, whence the current name.

=== Middle Ages ===
Whatever its origin, Castellaneta was conquered by the Normans in 1064, taken by Duke Robert of Taranto, who expelled its Byzantine inhabitants. At that time, probably, the episcopal see was created. In the 13th century Charles of Anjou turned it first into a fief, and later into a King's city.

=== Italian Wars ===
In 1503, during the Italian Wars, the citizens pushed back a French occupation force under the Duke of Nemours, in the so-called "Sack of Castellaneta". In 1519 the Spaniards sold it to Flemish feudatories, and thenceforth the city started to decline as secondary centre.

=== Modern Italy ===
In 1944, Castellaneta was bombed by the withdrawing German military, killing 27 people. The city received a bronze medal for civic valour.

A six-story apartment building in the city collapsed in February 1985, killing 21 people and injuring 9. The foundation was believed to have been severely weakened by torrential rains following a harsh winter in Italy.

== Main sights ==
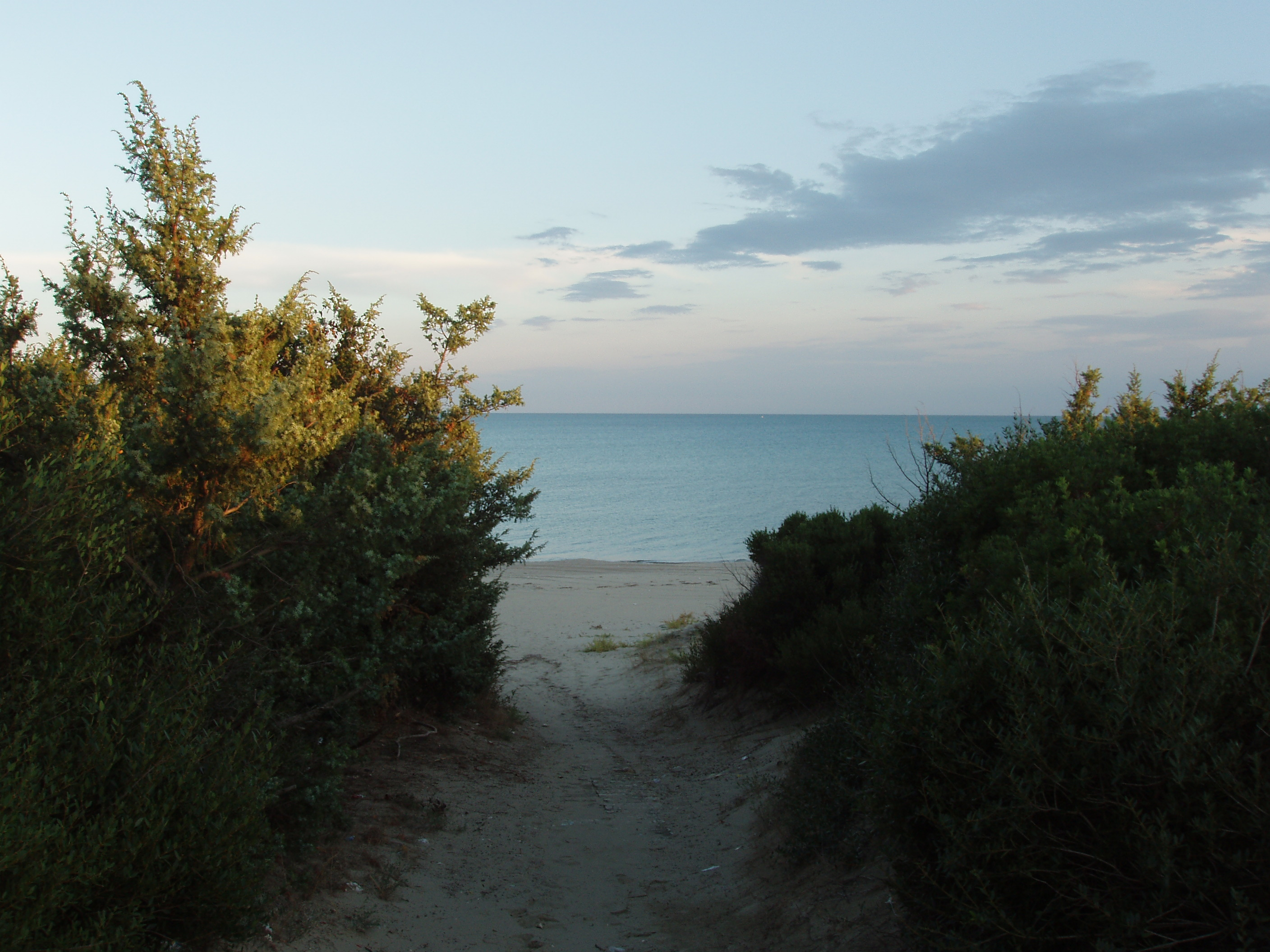
The sea in the frazione of Castellaneta Marina.

- The Castellaneta Cathedral (Chiesa di San Nicola) was built in 1220 but was totally remade in the 18th century, along Baroque lines. Noteworthy are the façade and three canvasses by Carlo Porta. Annexed is the Palazzo Vescovile (Bishops' Palace), housing other works of art. The cathedral is named after Saint Nicholas, whose relics are held in the nearest big city, Bari.
- San Domenico, with a façade in both Renaissance and Baroque styles.
- San Francesco d'Assisi (1471), with canvasses from the 17th century.
- Santa Maria della Luce (13th century), is one of the few example of Angevine-Gothic architecture in the area, along with the Cathedral's bell tower. Built on uneven terrain, it is in the shape of a ship's deck, and has interesting frescoes in the interior.
- The Gravina of Castelleneta and numerous carved caves, once inhabited by local population, some of them used as churches.
- The Rudolph Valentino Museum with exhibits on the life of the movie actor including movie posters, the bed he slept in as a child in Castellaneta and a reconstruction of a set from the movie The Son of the Sheik with the tent used in the film.
- Rudolph Valentino memorial, designed by architect Nicola Cantore with a blue ceramic statue of the actor by Luigi Gheno, dedicated in 1961 the ceremony for its unveiling is seen in the documentary Mondo Cane.

== People ==
Actor Rudolph Valentino was born in Castellaneta in 1895. The ancestors of Dan Castellaneta, an actor and voice actor best known for his work on The Simpsons, were from the city.

== Sources ==
- Arditi, Giacomo (1895). La corografia fisica e storica della Provincia di Terra d'Otranto. Lecce. pp. 118–125.
- Colafemmina, Donato (1980). Castellaneta nei manoscritti del Prof. Nicola d'Alagni. Castellaneta.
