= Aemona (disambiguation) =

Aemona was a Roman castrum in the Ljubljana Basin.

Aemona may also refer to:

- Aemona (Titular See), a diocese of the Roman Catholic Church
- Aemona (butterfly), a genus
