= Girolamo Farnese =

17th-century Roman Catholic cardinal

His Eminence Girolamo Farnese
- Cardinal-Priest of Sant'Agnese fuori le mura
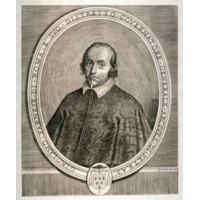
- Church: Catholic Church

Orders
- Consecration: 26 Apr 1639 by Giovanni Battista Scanaroli

Personal details
- Born: 30 Sep 1599 Parma, Italy
- Died: 18 Feb 1668 (age 68) Rome, Italy

Girolamo Farnese (1599–1668) was a Roman Catholic cardinal.

== Biography ==
On 26 Apr 1639, was consecrated bishop by Giovanni Battista Scanaroli, titular Bishop of Sidon, with Tommaso Carafa, Bishop Emeritus of Vulturara e Montecorvino, and Giovanni Battista Altieri (seniore), Bishop Emeritus of Camerino, serving as co-consecrators.

== Episcopal succession ==
While bishop, he was the principal consecrator of:

- Giannicolò Conti, Bishop of Ancona e Numana (1666);

the principal co-consecrator of

- Luca Torreggiani, Archbishop of Ravenna (1645);
- Cristofor Segni, Titular Archbishop of Thessalonica (1646);
- Maffeo Vitale, Bishop of Mantova (1646);
- Francesco Angelo Rapaccioli, Bishop of Terni (1646);
- Pietro Vito Ottoboni, Bishop of Brescia (1654); and
- Giovanni Battista Brescia, Bishop of Vicenza (1655).

Catholic Church titles
Preceded by Ciriaco Rocci	Titular Archbishop of Patrae; 1639–1658	Succeeded by Ottaviano Carafa
Preceded by Ranuccio Scotti Douglas	Apostolic Nuncio to Switzerland; 1639–1643	Succeeded by Lorenzo Gavotti
Preceded by Baccio Aldobrandini	Cardinal-Priest of Sant'Agnese fuori le mura 1658–1668	Succeeded by Vitaliano Visconti
