= Beniamino Pizziol =

Italian Catholic priest, Bishop

The Most Reverend Beniamino Pizziol
- Bishop of Vicenza
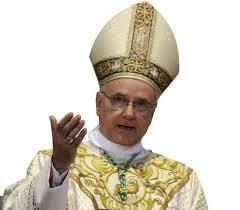
- Church: Roman Catholic Church
- Diocese: Vicenza
- See: Vicenza
- Appointed: 16 April 2011
- Installed: 19 June 2011
- Predecessor: Cesare Nosiglia
- Previous posts: Titular Bishop of Novigrad (2008-11); Auxiliary Bishop of Venice (2008-11); Apostolic Administrator of Venice (2011-12)

Orders
- Ordination: 3 December 1972 by Albino Luciani
- Consecration: 24 February 2008 by Angelo Scola
- Rank: Bishop

Personal details
- Born: Beniamino Pizziol; June 15, 1947 (age 78) Ca’ Vio-Treporti, Italy
- Denomination: Roman Catholic
- Motto: Deus caritas est ("God is love")
- Coat of arms

Beniamino Pizziol, born 15 June 1947 in Ca’ Vio-Treporti is an Italian Roman Catholic bishop.

== Biography ==
He was ordained priest on 3 December 1972 by Albino Luciani, Cardinal Patriarch of Venice (later Pope John Paul I). From 1972 to 1987, he was an assistant pastor, and from 1987 to 2002 pastor of San Trovaso, Venice and in charge of campus ministry. From 1996 to 2002 he was assistant to some Catholic organizations and from 1997 to 2002 Pro-Vicar Forane. From 1999 to 2002, he was a member of the Priest Consultants.

=== Bishop ===
On 5 January 2008 Pope Benedict XVI appointed him Auxiliary bishop of Venice and Titular Bishop of Aemona. He was consecrated by Cardinal Angelo Scola, Patriarch of Venice with Patriarch Emeritus Cardinal Marco Cé and Eugenio Ravignani, Bishop of Trieste, as co-consecrators.

On 16 April 2011 he was appointed Bishop of Vicenza. On 9 September he was appointed Apostolic Administrator of Venice, pending the appointment of a new Patriarch, who was installed on 25 March 2012.
