= Repole =

Repole is a surname. Notable people with the surname include:

- Charles Repole (fl. from 1975), American actor and director
- Mike Repole (born 1969), American businessman
- Roberto Repole (born 1967), Italian Catholic archbishop
