= Diocese of Susa =

The Diocese of Susa or Bishopric of Susa may refer to:

- East Syriac Diocese of Susa (3rd–13th centuries), part of Beth Huzaye (East Syriac ecclesiastical province)
- Diocese of Susa, a Catholic diocese in Italy (1772–present)
