= Antonio Priuli =

Antonio Priuli may refer to:

- Antonio Priuli (doge) (1548–1623), doge of Venice
- Antonio Maria Priuli (1707–1772), Italian Roman Catholic cardinal
