= Gesù Divin Maestro alla Pineta Sacchetti =

Gesù Divin Maestro alla Pineta Saccheti
- Iesu Divini Magistris in regione vulgo Pineta Saccheti (in Latin)
- Chiesa Parrocchiale di Gesù Divino Maestro (in Italian)
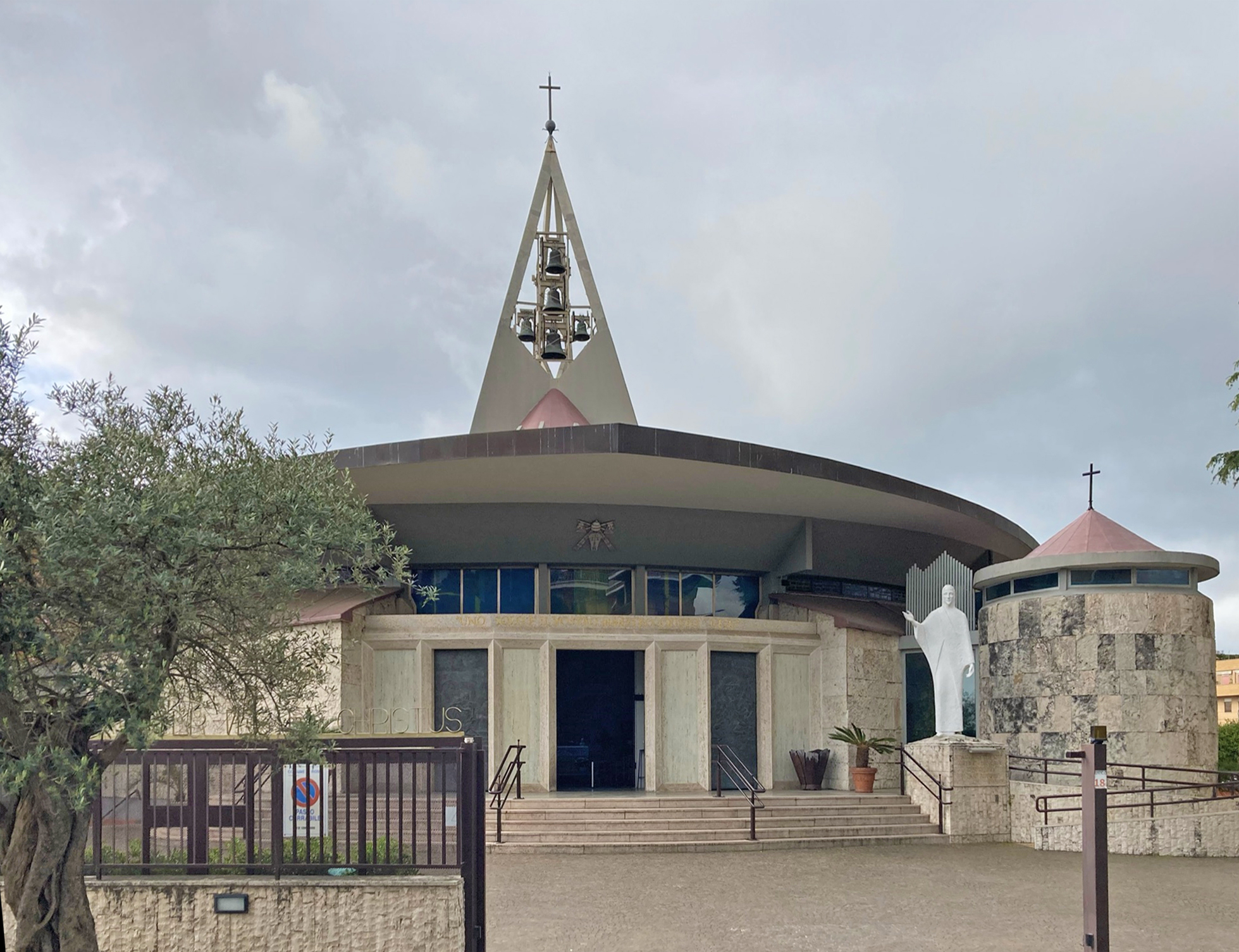
- Exterior
- Click on the map for a fullscreen view
- 41°55′23″N 12°25′31″E
- Location: Via Vittorio Montiglio 18, Rome
- Country: Italy
- Denomination: Roman Catholic
- Tradition: Roman Rite
- Website: Official website

History
- Status: Titular church
- Dedication: Jesus (as the Divine Teacher)
- Consecrated: 1967

Architecture
- Architect: Carlo Bevilacqua
- Architectural type: Church
- Groundbreaking: 1966
- Completed: 1967

Administration
- District: Lazio
- Province: Rome

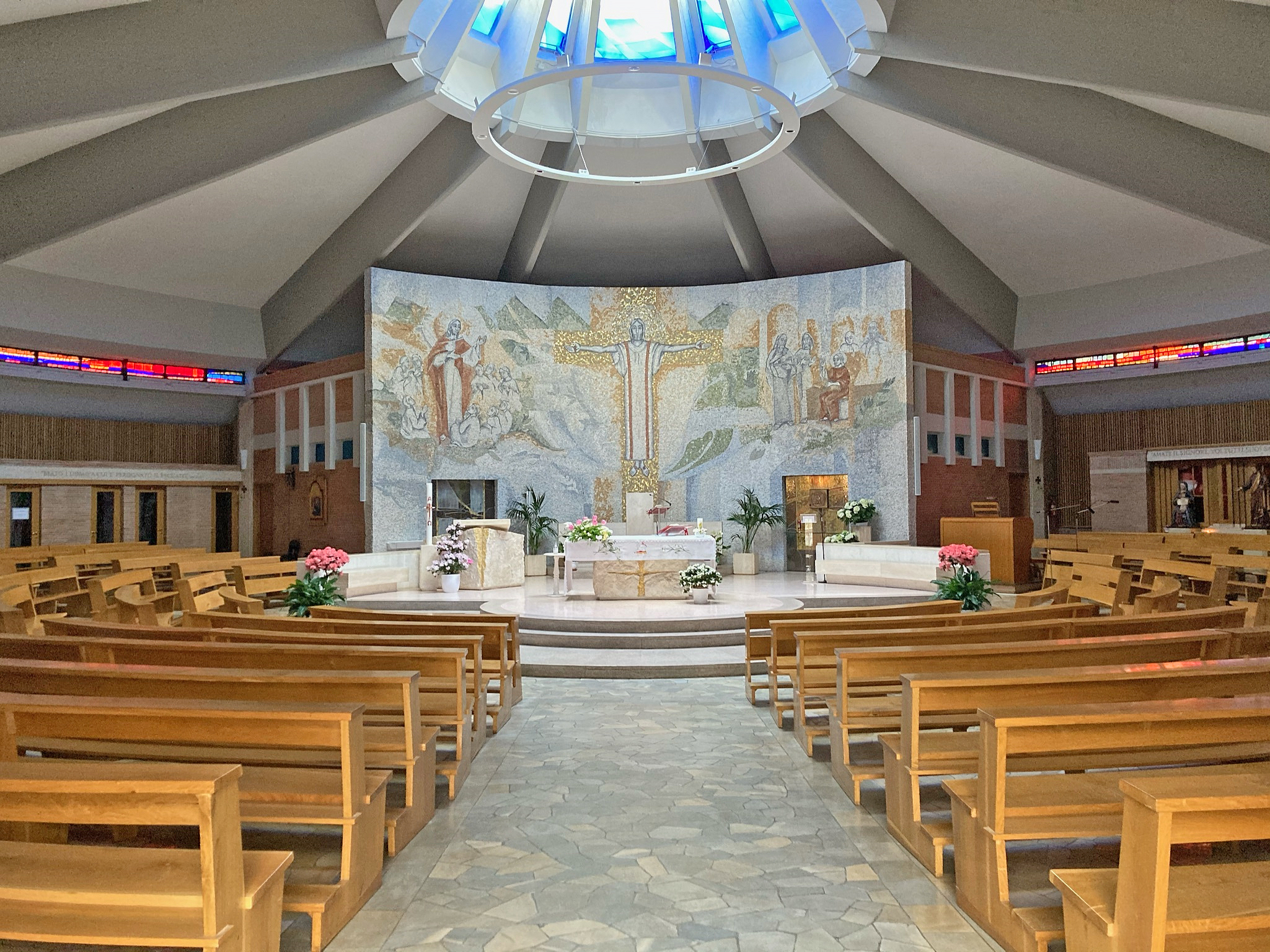
Interior

The church of Church of Jesus the Divine Teacher at the Pineta Sacchetti (Gesù Divin Maestro alla Pineta Sacchetti) is a titular church in Rome, in Balduina (Trionfale district), in Via Vittorio Montiglio. The name refers to Jesus as the Divine Teacher, and to Pineta Sacchetti (part of Pineto Regional Park), named for the Sacchetti, a powerful family of the medieval period, and its groves of stone pines.

== History ==
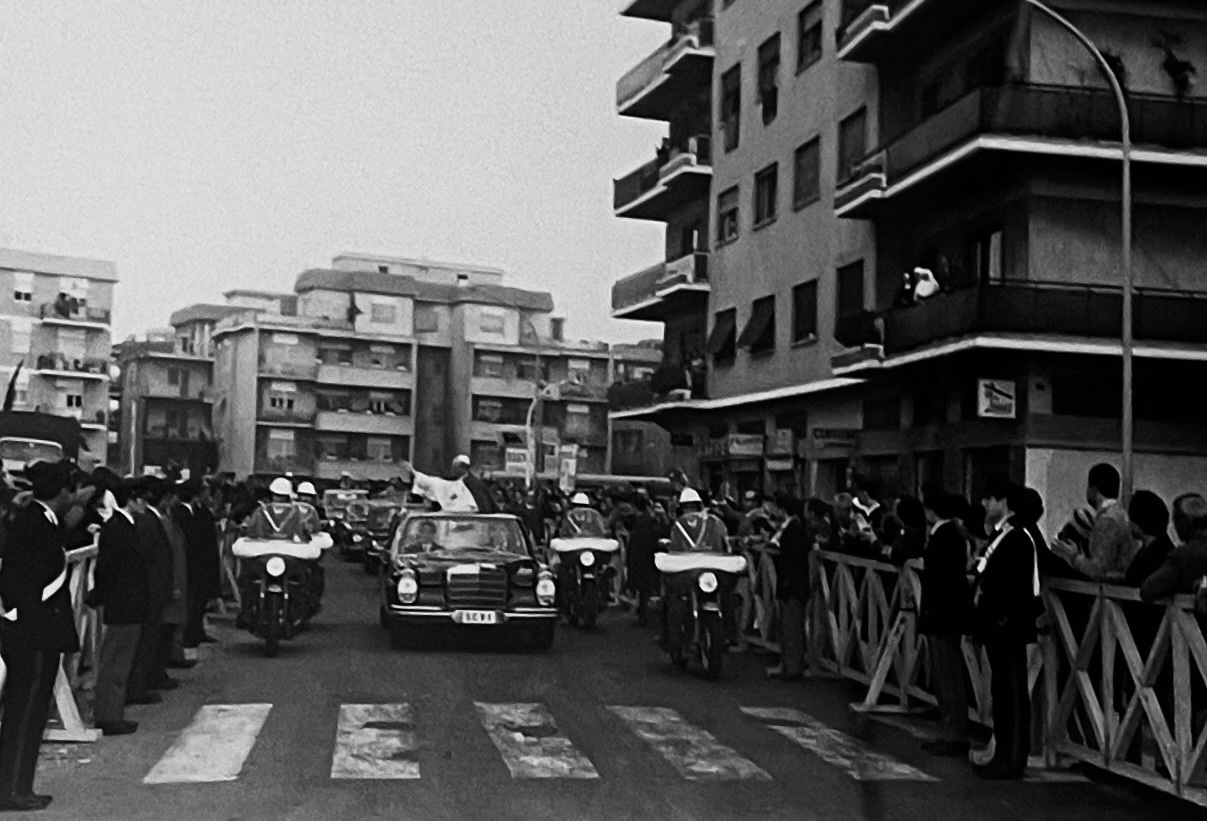
Pope Paul VI greets the faithful of the Balduina neighborhood in Rome

Gesù Divin Maestro alla Pineta Sacchetti was built between 1966 and 1967 by the architect Carlo Bevilacqua and solemnly inaugurated by Cardinal Luigi Traglia then consecrated on 30 September 1967. The church is home parish, established on 2 March 1964 by the vicar Cardinal Clemente Micara with the decree Percrescente de die and initially entrusted to the priests of the diocese of Brescia and then, from 1978 to the Roman diocesan clergy. It also is home to the cardinal's title "Jesus the Divine Master at the Pineta Sacchetti", founded by Pope Paul VI 29 April 1969: it was the pope who wanted this title because of the presence in the parish territory of the Faculty of Medicine of the University Cattolica del Sacro Cuore. Thomas Stafford Williams was recent cardinal-protector.

== Art and architecture ==
The church is circular, the porphyry pavement edged and slightly downhill towards the center from which rises with three steps the presbytery, with the centrality of the altar and the ambo of wider dimension that manifests the table of the word. Behind the altar, the seat of white marble, which incorporates the circularity of the presbytery, which opens with a large sunburst on the assembly. The floor to venesiana and striking pink. The large wall of the presbytery background has a large mosaic which shows three images the figure of Jesus the Divine Master: to the right the Master 12 years that dialogues with the doctors in the temple, left the Master of the Beatitudes and the center Christ the Servant on the cross who wears the white dalmatic, to indicate how the Master teaches his people to the service of the Father.

== Cardinal-priests ==
Pope Paul VI established Gesù Divin Maestro alla Pineta Sacchetti as a titular church on 30 April 1969.

- John Joseph Wright, 30 April 1969 appointed – 10 August 1979 died
- Thomas Stafford Williams, 2 February 1983 appointed – 22 December 2023 died
- Roberto Repole, 7 December 2024 appointed – present
