= Giuseppe Civran =

17th-century Catholic bishop

Most Reverend Giuseppe Civran
- Bishop of Vicenza
- Church: Catholic Church
- Diocese: Diocese of Vicenza
- In office: 1660–1679
- Predecessor: Giovanni Battista Brescia
- Successor: Giambattista Rubini

Personal details
- Born: 1629 Venice, Italy
- Died: 17 May 1679 (age 50) Vicenza, Italy

Giuseppe Civran (1629 – 17 May 1679) was a Roman Catholic prelate who served as Bishop of Vicenza (1660–1679).

== Biography ==
Giuseppe Civran was born in Venice, Italy in 1629. He was a Referendary of the Two Signatures (judge) in the Roman Curia. He was subsequently governor of four cities in the Papal States.

On 21 June 1660, he was appointed Bishop of Vicenza by Pope Innocent XI. He held a diocesan synod in Vicenza in 1666, and published the acts.

He served as Bishop of Vicenza until his death on 17 May 1679.

== External links and additional sources ==
- Cheney, David M. "Diocese of Vicenza". Catholic-Hierarchy.org. (for Chronology of Bishops) ^{[self-published]}
- Chow, Gabriel. "Diocese of Vicenza". GCatholic.org. (for Chronology of Bishops) ^{[self-published]}
- Riccardi, Tommaso (1786). Storia Dei Vescovi Vicentini (in Italian). Vicenza: Vendramini Mosca. pp. 220–224.

Catholic Church titles
Preceded by Giovanni Battista Brescia	Bishop of Vicenza; 1660–1679	Succeeded by Giambattista Rubini
