= Pietro Giacomo Nonis =

Pietro Giacomo Nonis (24 April 1927 – 15 July 2014) was a Catholic bishop.

Ordained to the priesthood in 1950, Nonis was named Bishop of Vicenza, Italy in 1988. He retired in 2003.

== External links and additional sources ==
- Cheney, David M. "Diocese of Vicenza". Catholic-Hierarchy.org. (for Chronology of Bishops)^{self-published}
- Chow, Gabriel. "Diocese of Vicenza". GCatholic.org. (for Chronology of Bishops)^{self-published}
