= Rinaldo da Concorezzo =

Italian Roman Catholic priest and archbishop

Blessed Rinaldo da Concorezzo
- Archbishop of Ravenna-Cervia
- Church: Roman Catholic Church
- Archdiocese: Ravenna-Cervia
- See: Ravenna-Cervia
- Appointed: 19 November 1303
- Installed: October 1305
- Term ended: 18 August 1321
- Predecessor: Obizzo Sanvitale
- Successor: Rinaldo da Polenta
- Previous post: Bishop of Vicenza (1296-1303)

Orders
- Consecration: 1296
- Rank: Archbishop

Personal details
- Born: Rinaldo da Concorezzo; 1245 Milan, Commune of Milan
- Died: 18 August 1321 (aged 76) Argenta, Ferrara, Republic of Venice
- Buried: Ravenna Cathedral, Italy

Sainthood
- Feast day: 18 August
- Venerated in: Roman Catholic Church
- Beatified: 18 August 1852; Saint Peter's Basilica, Papal States by Pope Pius IX
- Attributes: Episcopal attire; Crozier

Rinaldo da Concorezzo (1245 - 18 August 1321) was an Italian Roman Catholic priest and archbishop who served as the Bishop of Vicenza from 1296 until his 1303 appointment as the Archbishop of Ravenna-Cervia holding that until his death.

Rinaldo served as a close confidant to Pope Boniface VIII before the latter was elected as pontiff and is known for attempting to secure the rehabilitation of the Knights Templar.

His beatification received formal confirmation on 18 August 1852 from Pope Pius IX after the latter approved his local 'cultus' - or popular and enduring devotion.

== Life ==
Rinaldo da Concorezzo was born to nobles in Milan in 1245.

In his adolescence, he completed his studies in Bologna and began to teach canon law in Lodi from October 1286. The Bishop of Lodi, in May 1287, summoned him for legal expertise and Rinaldo later gained the academic title of "Magister" in 1295.

In 1289, he entered the staff of the Vice Chancellor of the Roman Curia Cardinal Pietro Peregrosso and he became an heir of the cardinal in the latter's will after he died in 1295. Rinaldo became a private aide and later the chaplain to Cardinal Benedetto Caetani, who became Pope Boniface VIII in 1294.

Boniface VIII appointed him as the Bishop of Vicenza on 13 October 1296 to the disappointment of the locals, who in defiance chose their own appointee but the pontiff's decision soon prevailed and Rinaldo received his episcopal consecration and was installed as bishop. The French monarch Charles of Valois, as well as the pope called on Bishop Rinaldo and asked him to travel to Florence to support the 'blacks' faction. He later went as the Vicar of Romagna in 1302 and was later made the province's rector. He finished that term in 1305 and was almost killed on one occasion.

The death of Boniface VIII came as a slight blow to the bishop though Pope Benedict XI appointed him on 19 November 1303 as the Archbishop of Ravenna-Cervia and Rinaldo was installed in his new archdiocese in October 1305.

He convoked a provincial council in 1307 and then resumed the old practice of visiting all parishes contained within the archdiocese. He held a second in 1309 and another in 1311 all in Ravenna. He visited northern Italian cities in tumult to reconcile them with the empire's monarch Henry VII. In 1314, he called the fourth in Argenta in order to restore discipline to priests and liturgical matters. He called for the fifth and last in Bologna in 1317.

He attempted to defend and secure the rehabilitation of the Knights Templar at the Council of Ravenna and opposed the decision of Pope Clement V to dissolve and condemn them. Archbishop Rinaldo was also a friend of Dante Alighieri.

Rinaldo's health began to deteriorate in 1314 to the point where he settled in an Argenta castle and ran his archdiocese through his vicars. He died in that castle on 18 August 1321 and was interred in the Ravenna Cathedral; he was exhumed in 1566 and found incorrupt with his long beard still intact.

== Beatification ==
The ratification of his local 'cultus' - or popular and enduring devotion - allowed for Pope Pius IX to approve his beatification on 18 August 1852.
