= Edoardo Giuseppe Rosaz =

Italian Roman Catholic prelate

Blessed Bishop Edoardo Giuseppe Rosaz
- Bishop of Susa
- Church: Roman Catholic Church
- Diocese: Susa
- See: Susa
- Appointed: 31 December 1877
- Term ended: 3 May 1903
- Predecessor: Federico Mascaretti
- Successor: Carlo Marozio

Orders
- Ordination: 10 June 1854
- Consecration: 24 February 1878 by Lorenzo Gastaldi

Personal details
- Born: Edoardo Giuseppe Rosaz; 15 February 1830 Susa, Turin, Kingdom of Sardinia
- Died: 3 May 1903 (aged 73) Susa, Turin, Kingdom of Italy

Sainthood
- Feast day: 3 May
- Venerated in: Roman Catholic Church
- Beatified: 14 July 1991; Susa, Italy by Pope John Paul II
- Attributes: Episcopal attire
- Patronage: Franciscan Mission Sisters of Susa

Edoardo Giuseppe Rosaz (15 February 1830 – 3 May 1903) was an Italian Roman Catholic prelate who served as the Bishop of Susa from 1877 until his death and was the founder of the Franciscan Mission Sisters of Susa. He was appointed a bishop at the suggestion of John Bosco. His apostolic zeal became even greater as a bishop when he tended to abandoned people in the peripheries and encouraged the work of a range of different religious orders.

Pope John Paul II beatified him in 1991.

== Life ==
Edoardo Giuseppe Rosaz was born on 15 February 1830 as the fifth of seven children to refugees in Susa; he was baptized in the Susa Cathedral on 16 February. His parents were refugees due to the French Revolution. His father drowned himself in the Po River in 1845 and his brother Carlo Vittorio died sometime after in a mental hospital. His sister Clotilde also suffered from epileptic episodes which made life difficult for him and those around him.

He was tutored at home until 1840 when he attended the Gianotti di Saluzzo school in Turin from 1840 to 1845. Rosaz became a member of the Third Order of Saint Francis in 1853 and began his ecclesial studies in 1847 which completed his studies in Nice in France where he was ordained to the priesthood. Rosaz began to serve as a chaplain in prisons and he also opened a retreat for girls in 1862 while later befriending Giovanni Bosco; this friendship later saw him appointed as the rector of seminarians in Susa from 1874 to 1877. Pope Pius IX appointed him as the Bishop of Susa on 31 December 1877 - at Bosco's suggestion - and the Archbishop of Turin Lorenzo Gastaldi granted him his episcopal consecration in 1878 in the Susa Cathedral. He wept upon learning he was to be made a bishop and sent a letter to Cardinal Giacomo Antonelli protesting the appointment in spite of his lack of theological or canon law doctorate.

He founded the Franciscan Mission Sisters on 4 October 1882 for women and at some stage issued a catechism. He encouraged religious orders (such as the Conventual Franciscans and the Salesians) in his diocese and founded a diocesan newspaper in 1897 titled "Il Rocciamelone".

Rosaz made a pilgrimage to Novalesa on 13 March 1862 and in 1872 travelled to Savona to collaborate with Maria Giuseppa Rossello in the foundations of her new religious order. In January 1888 he was at Bosco's deathbed in Turin and attended his funeral, while in 1894 Rosaz took part in the Eucharistic Congress in Turin and another in Milan in 1895. In 1898 he led diocesan pilgrimages to Rome and to Turin for the exposition of the Holy Shroud.

Rosaz died on the morning of 3 May 1903; he had been struck with an illness on 12 January that had forced him to his bed. His remains were later relocated in 1919 to the motherhouse of his order. His order received diocesan approval on 2 February 1903 while being aggregated to the Order of Friars Minor Capuchin on 9 March 1906. It received the decree of praise from Pope Pius XI on 10 July 1934 and papal approval from Pope Pius XII on 27 July 1942. In 2005 there were 139 religious in 25 houses in places such as Albania and Switzerland.

== Beatification ==
Rosaz's spiritual writings were approved by theologians on 28 January 1944. The cause for his sainthood opened under Pius XII on 26 July 1953 and Rosaz was titled a servant of God. The confirmation of his heroic virtue led Pope John Paul II to name him venerable on 22 March 1986. John Paul beatified Rosaz on his pastoral visit to Susa on 14 July 1991.
