= Cesare Nosiglia =

Italian prelate of the Catholic Church (1944–2025)

The Most Reverend Cesare Nosiglia
- Archbishop Emeritus of Turin
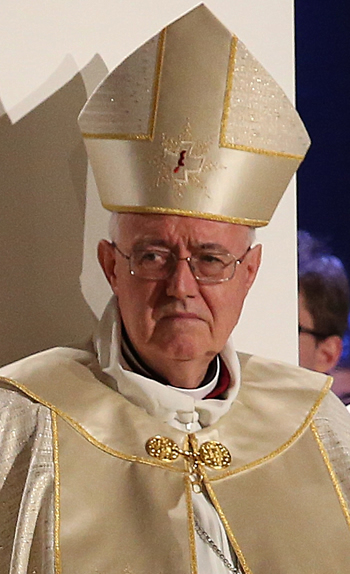
- Nosiglia in 2015
- Church: Catholic Church
- Archdiocese: Turin
- See: Turin
- Appointed: 11 October 2010
- Installed: 21 November 2010
- Term ended: 19 February 2022
- Predecessor: Severino Poletto
- Successor: Roberto Repole
- Previous posts: Titular Bishop of Victoriana (1991–96); Auxiliary Bishop of Rome (1991–2003); Titular Archbishop of Victoriana (1996–2003); Vicegerent of Rome (1996–2003); Archbishop-Bishop of Vicenza (2003–10); Vice-President of the Italian Episcopal Conference (2010–15)

Orders
- Ordination: 29 June 1968 by Giuseppe Dell'Omo
- Consecration: 14 September 1991 by Camillo Ruini

Personal details
- Born: Cesare Nosiglia; 5 October 1944 Rossiglione, Italy
- Died: 27 August 2025 (aged 80) Chieri, Italy
- Education: Pontifical Lateran University; Pontifical Biblical Institute
- Motto: Caritas congaudet veritati
- Coat of arms

Styles of Cesare Nosiglia
- Reference style: His Excellency; The Most Reverend
- Spoken style: Your Excellency
- Religious style: Archbishop

Cesare Nosiglia (5 October 1944 – 27 August 2025) was an Italian prelate of the Catholic Church who was the Archbishop of Turin from 2010 to 2022. He was a bishop from 1991 on, serving first as an auxiliary bishop of Rome, vicegerent of Rome with the title of archbishop from 1996 to 2003, and then Archbishop-Bishop of Vicenza from 2003 to 2010.

== Biography ==
Nosiglia was born on 5 October 1944 in Rossiglione, Italy, and was raised in Campo Ligure. He studied at the seminary in Acqui Terme and was ordained a priest of the Diocese of Acqui on 29 June 1968 by Bishop Giuseppe Dell'Omo. Studying in Rome he obtained a licence in theology from the Lateran University and a licentiate in sacred scripture from the Pontifical Biblical Institute. He worked at the National Catechetical Office of the Italian Episcopal Conference (CEI) from 1971 to 1983, as its vice director from 1983 to 1986, and as director from 1986 to 1991. His pastoral assignments included working at the parish of San Giovanni Battista De Rossi from 1968 to 1975 and the parish of San Filippo Neri from 1975 to 1991. He also taught theology at the Pontifical Athenaeum of Saint Anselm from 1978 to 1980.

On 6 July 1991, Pope John Paul II appointed him Auxiliary Bishop of Rome and Titular Bishop of Victoriana. He was consecrated on 14 September 1991 by Cardinal Camillo Ruini. He was relator of synod of the Diocese of Rome and led its post-synod commission. On 19 July 1996, he was given the personal rank of archbishop and named vicegerent of Rome. He was a member of the CEI's Commission for doctrine and catechesis from 1992 to 1995. He also served as secretary of its Commission for Catholic Education from 1995 to 2000 and then president of that Commission from 2000 to 2005.

On 6 October 2003, he was named Bishop of Vicenza, retaining the personal rank of archbishop. On 25 May 2010, he was elected vice president of the CEI.

On 11 October 2010, Pope Benedict XVI appointed him Archbishop of Turin.

In August 2019, Pope Francis decided that Nosiglia would serve two years past the normal retirement age of 75.

On 12 October 2019, he was named Apostolic Administrator of Susa.

Pope Francis accepted his resignation from both his Susa and Turin positions on 19 February 2022.

Nosiglia died on 27 August 2025, at the age of 80.

Catholic Church titles
Preceded by Pietro Giacomo Nonis	Archbishop-Bishop of Vicenza; 2001–2010	Succeeded by Beniamino Pizziol
Preceded by Severino Poletto	Archbishop of Turin; 2010–2022	Succeeded by Roberto Repole
