= Giovanni Battista Brescia =

Most Reverend Giovanni Battista Brescia
- Bishop of Vicenza
- Church: Catholic Church
- Diocese: Diocese of Vicenza
- In office: 1655–1660
- Predecessor: Marcantonio Bragadin
- Successor: Giuseppe Civran

Orders
- Consecration: 4 July 1655 by Marcantonio Bragadin

Personal details
- Died: 1660 Vicenza, Italy

Giovanni Battista Brescia (died 1660) was a Roman Catholic prelate who served as Bishop of Vicenza (1655–1660).

== Biography ==
On 14 June 1655, Giovanni Battista Brescia was appointed during the papacy of Pope Alexander VII as Bishop of Vicenza. On 4 July 1655, he was consecrated bishop by Marcantonio Bragadin, Cardinal-Priest of San Marco, with Pier Luigi Carafa (bishop), Bishop of Tricarico, and Girolamo Farnese, Titular Archbishop of Patrae, serving as co-consecrators. He served as Bishop of Vicenza until his death in 1660.

== External links and additional sources ==
- Cheney, David M. "Diocese of Vicenza". Catholic-Hierarchy.org. (for Chronology of Bishops) ^{[self-published]}
- Chow, Gabriel. "Diocese of Vicenza". GCatholic.org. (for Chronology of Bishops) ^{[self-published]}

Catholic Church titles
Preceded by Marcantonio Bragadin	Bishop of Vicenza; 1655–1660	Succeeded by Giuseppe Civran
