= Bevke =

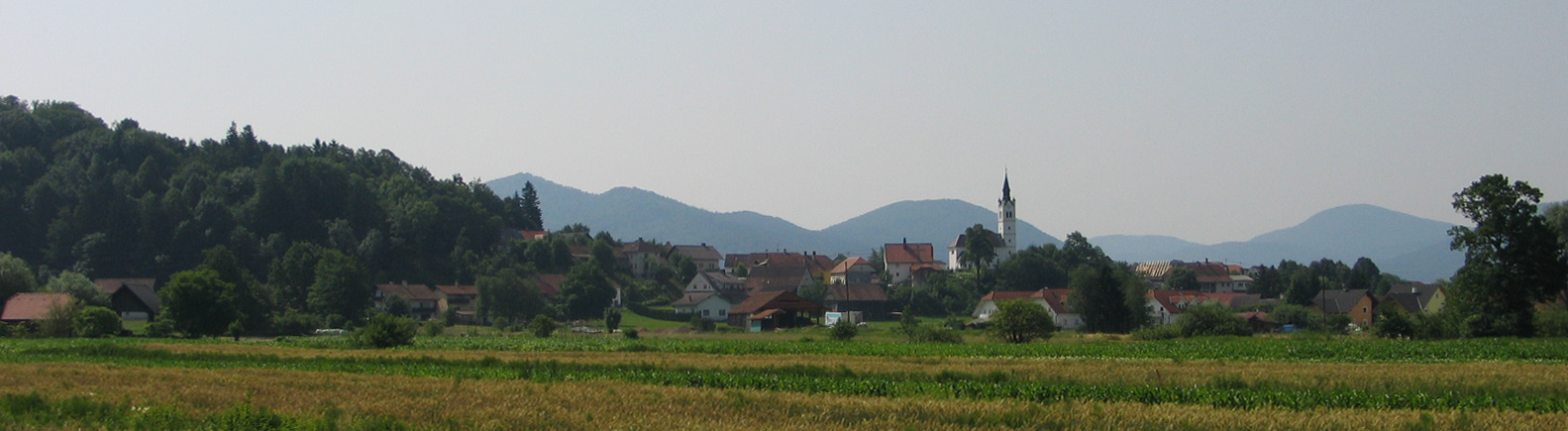

- Location in Slovenia
- Coordinates: 45°58′53.66″N 14°21′37.64″E
- Country: Slovenia
- Traditional region: Inner Carniola
- Statistical region: Central Slovenia
- Municipality: Vrhnika

Area
  - Total: 7.56 km^{2} (2.92 sq mi)
- Elevation: 286.7 m (941 ft)

Population (2002)
  - Total: 791

Bevke (pronounced [ˈbeːu̯kɛ]) is a village northeast of Vrhnika in the Inner Carniola region of Slovenia.

== Name ==
Bevke was attested in written records in 1391 as zu Bewkch. The name is likely originally an accusative plural form of a masculine personal name, preserved today in the surname Bevk. However, derivation from the Slavic personal name *Bělъkъ (originally an epithet for someone with light skin) is problematic because the change -lk- > -vk- did not occur until the 16th century.

== History ==
In 1782 Bevke had no more than 24 houses. New houses were built as the surrounding marshland gradually dried out. By 1937, the population had grown to 400 people living in 80 houses. This increased to 656 people in 1995, and over 1,000 in 2012.

== Church ==
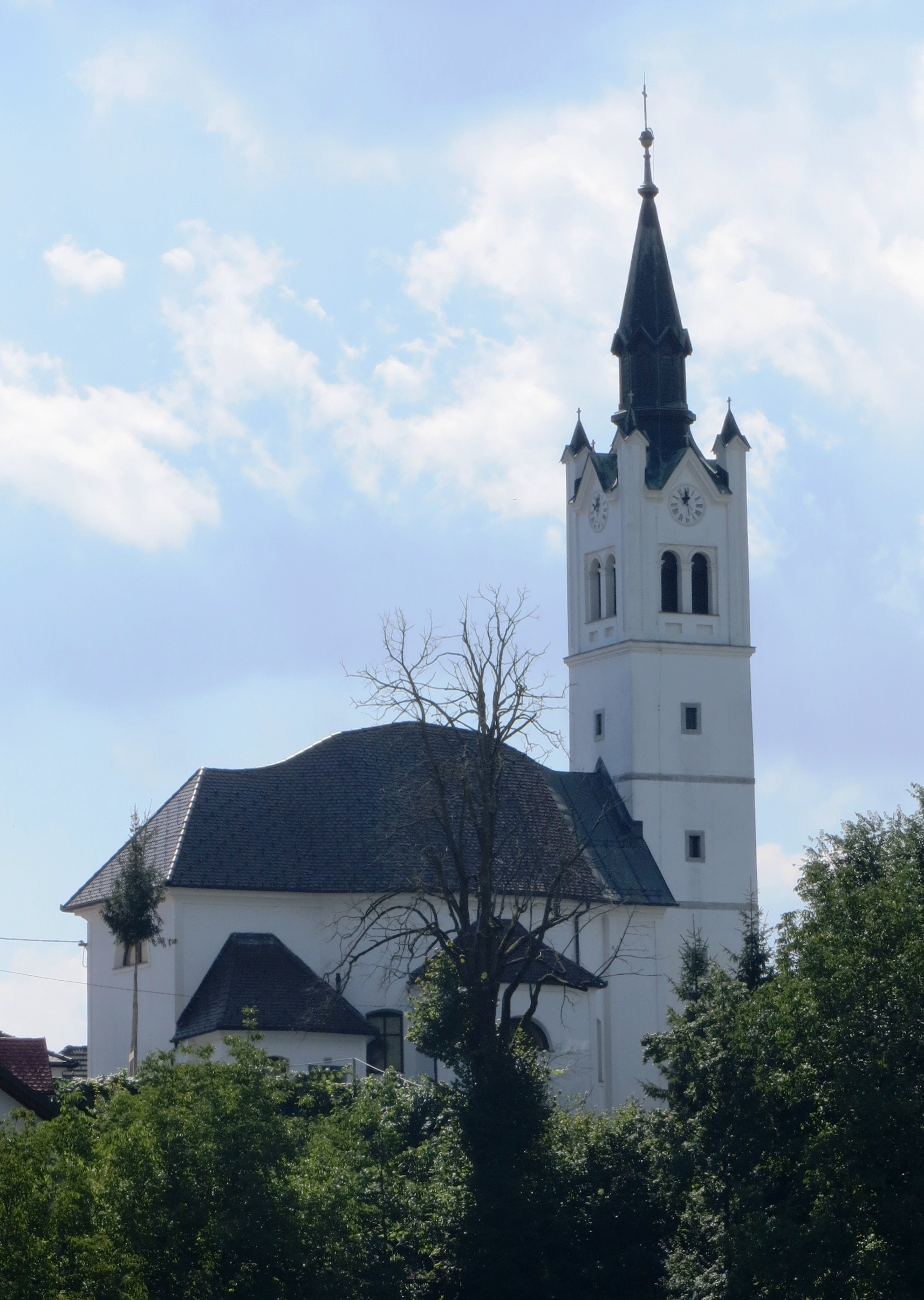
Holy Cross Church

The parish church in the settlement is dedicated to the Exaltation of the Holy Cross and belongs to the Ljubljana Archdiocese. The church was recorded as a chapel of ease associated with the parish of Vrhnika in 1689. The village cemetery formerly surrounded the church, but it was discontinued at that location in 1859 and a new cemetery was established to the south in the hamlet of Za Ježe. The cemetery was expanded and a new funeral chapel was built in 1994.
