= Roberto Repole =

Italian prelate of the Catholic Church (born 1967)

His Eminence Roberto Repole
- Cardinal, Archbishop of Turin; Bishop of Susa
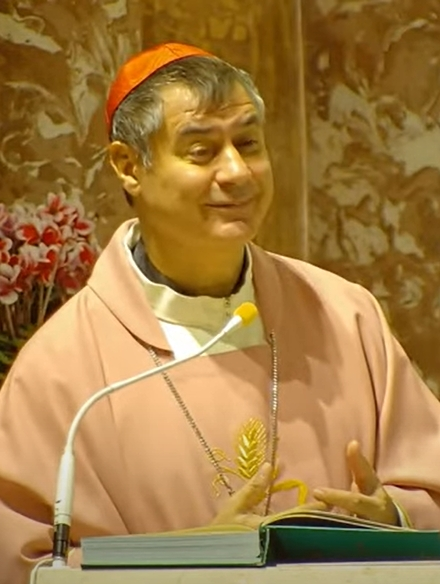
- Church: Catholic Church
- Archdiocese: Turin
- See: Turin and Susa
- Appointed: 19 February 2022
- Installed: 7 May 2022
- Predecessor: Cesare Nosiglia
- Other post: Cardinal-Priest of Gesù Divin Maestro alla Pineta Sacchetti (2024–)
- Previous posts: Lecturer in systematic theology, Theological Faculty of Turin and Higher Institute of Religious Sciences, Turin (1996-2022); Canon of the Royal Church of Saint Lawrence (2010-2022); President of the Italian Theological Association (2011-2016); Rector of the Turin section of the Theological Faculty of Northern Italy (2016-2022)

Orders
- Ordination: 13 June 1992 by Giovanni Saldarini
- Consecration: 7 May 2022 by Cesare Nosiglia
- Created cardinal: 7 December 2024 by Pope Francis
- Rank: Cardinal-Priest

Personal details
- Born: 29 January 1967 (age 59) Turin, Italy
- Education: Pontifical Gregorian University
- Motto: Christus tradidit seipsum pro me (Christ gave himself for me)
- Coat of arms

Roberto Repole (born 29 January 1967) is an Italian Catholic prelate who has served as Archbishop of Turin and Bishop of Susa since 2022. He taught theology at the university level from 1996 to 2022 and headed the Italian Theological Association from 2011 to 2016. Pope Francis made Repole a cardinal on 7 December 2024.

== Biography ==
Roberto Repole was born in the Givoletto district of Turin on 29 January 1967. His father was a municipal councilor in Druento. Both his parents were originally from Rapone in southern Italy. He completed his studies at the Liceo Valsalice in Turin in 1986 and then obtained his bachelor's degree in theology from the Faculty of Turin in 1992. He earned his licentiate (1998) and doctorate (2001) in theology at the Pontifical Gregorian University.

He was ordained a priest on 13 June 1992 by Cardinal Giovanni Saldarini. He then served as parish vicar from 1992 to 1996, lecturer in systematic theology at the Theological Faculty of Turin and the Higher Institute of Religious Sciences in Turin from 1996 to 2022, canon of the Royal Church of Saint Lawrence from 2010 to 2022, president of the Italian Theological Association from 2011 to 2016, and rector of the Turin section of the Theological Faculty of Northern Italy from 2016 to 2022. He was also a member of the administrative board of the Holy See Agency for the Evaluation and Promotion of Quality in Ecclesiastical Universities and Faculties (AVEPRO) from 2016 to 2022.

His roles on behalf of the archdiocese of Turin have included: coordinator of university pastoral care and a member for five years of the Diocesan Ecumenical Commission. Until 2022 he worked with the Santa Maria della Stella parish in Druento, was the diocesan ecclesiastical assistant of the Ecclesial Movement for Cultural Commitment (MEIC), and a member of the priests council.

Repole has been identified by some commentators as a "boariniano," that is, the member of a group of theologically and politically liberal clerics influenced by Sergio Boarino, who served as the rector of the Turin seminary during the 1980s and 1990s.

To mark the fifth anniversary of Francis' pontificate, Repole served as editor of La Teologia di Papa Francesco, an 11-volume series of analyses by theologians. Pope emeritus Benedict XVI expressed surprise at the inclusion of theologian Peter Hünermann, who, according to Benedict, had viciously attacked his teaching authority as pope. (Note: Benedict wrote: "Only as an aside, I would like to note my surprise at the fact that among the authors is also Professor Hünermann, who during my pontificate had distinguished himself by leading anti-papal initiatives. He played a major part in the release of the "Kölner Erklärung" [Cologne Declaration] which, in relation to the encyclical Veritatis splendor, virulently attacked the magisterial authority of the pope, especially on questions of moral theology.")

He has written extensively on church organization, synodality, and the priesthood. Of the theologian's role he once wrote: "Theology cannot afford the luxury of cryptic language. And to do this he has two paths to follow: always be of service to the concrete people of God and to their living faith and maintain a lively dialogue with the culture of the contemporary world." With Serena Noceti, he has edited a nine-volume series of commentaries on the principal documents of the Second Vatican Council, Commentario ai documenti del Vaticano II.

On 19 February 2022, Pope Francis appointed Repole both archbishop of Turin and bishop of Susa. The appointment was a surprise in that his name had not been mentioned in press speculation about candidates for the Turin post, (Note: In January 2022, La Repubblica reported the names of six prelates under consideration: the archbishop of Modena and the bishops of Ferrara, Pinerolo, Mondovì, Ventimiglia, and Gorizia. It also mentioned two priests as outsider choices Saverio Cannistrà, theologian and editor, and Donato Ogliari, the abbot of Monte Cassino.) and it was unusual in that someone named to head an archdiocese is almost always already a bishop. He is the first native of Turin to be named archbishop there since the appointment of Agostino Richelmy in 1897 and the first graduate of the Turin Faculty of Theology named archbishop. He was installed in Turin on 7 May when he received his episcopal consecration from his predecessor Archbishop Cesare Nosiglia, with co-consecrators Marco Arnolfo, archbishop of Vercelli, and Alfonso Badini Confalonieri, bishop emeritus of Susa. He chose as his episcopal motto Christus tradidit seipsum pro me ("Christ gave himself for me"). He was installed in Susa on 8 May.

On 7 December 2024, Pope Francis made him a cardinal, assigning him as a member of the order of cardinal priests with the title of Gesù Divin Maestro alla Pineta Sacchetti.

He participated as a cardinal elector in the 2025 papal conclave that elected Pope Leo XIV.

== Selected writings ==
Books

His publications include:

- Il pensiero umile. In ascolto della Rivelazione (Città Nuova, 2007)
- Seme del Regno. Introduzione alla Chiesa e al suo mistero (Esperienze)
- L'umiltà della Chiesa (Qiqajon, 2010)
- Come stelle in terra. La Chiesa nell'epoca della secolarizzazione (Cittadella, 2012)
- Dono (Rosenberg & Sellier, 2013)
- La vita cristiana (Edizioni San Paolo, 2013)
- Chiesa (Cittadella, 2015)
- Il sogno di una Chiesa evangelica (Libreria Vaticana, 2017)
  - The Dream of a Gospel-Inspired Church: Pope Francis' Ecclesiology (Coventry Press, 2019)
- Il dono dell’annuncio. Ripensare la Chiesa e la sua missione (Edizioni San Paolo, 2021)

Essays

- "Repole su Papa Francesco, la modernità e il discernimento". La Voce e il Tempo (in Italian). 15 March 2018.

== See also ==
- Cardinals created by Francis
