= Diocese of Vicenza =

Roman Catholic diocese in Italy

Coordinates: 45.5500°N 11.5500°E

Diocese of Vicenza Dioecesis Vicentina

Catholic
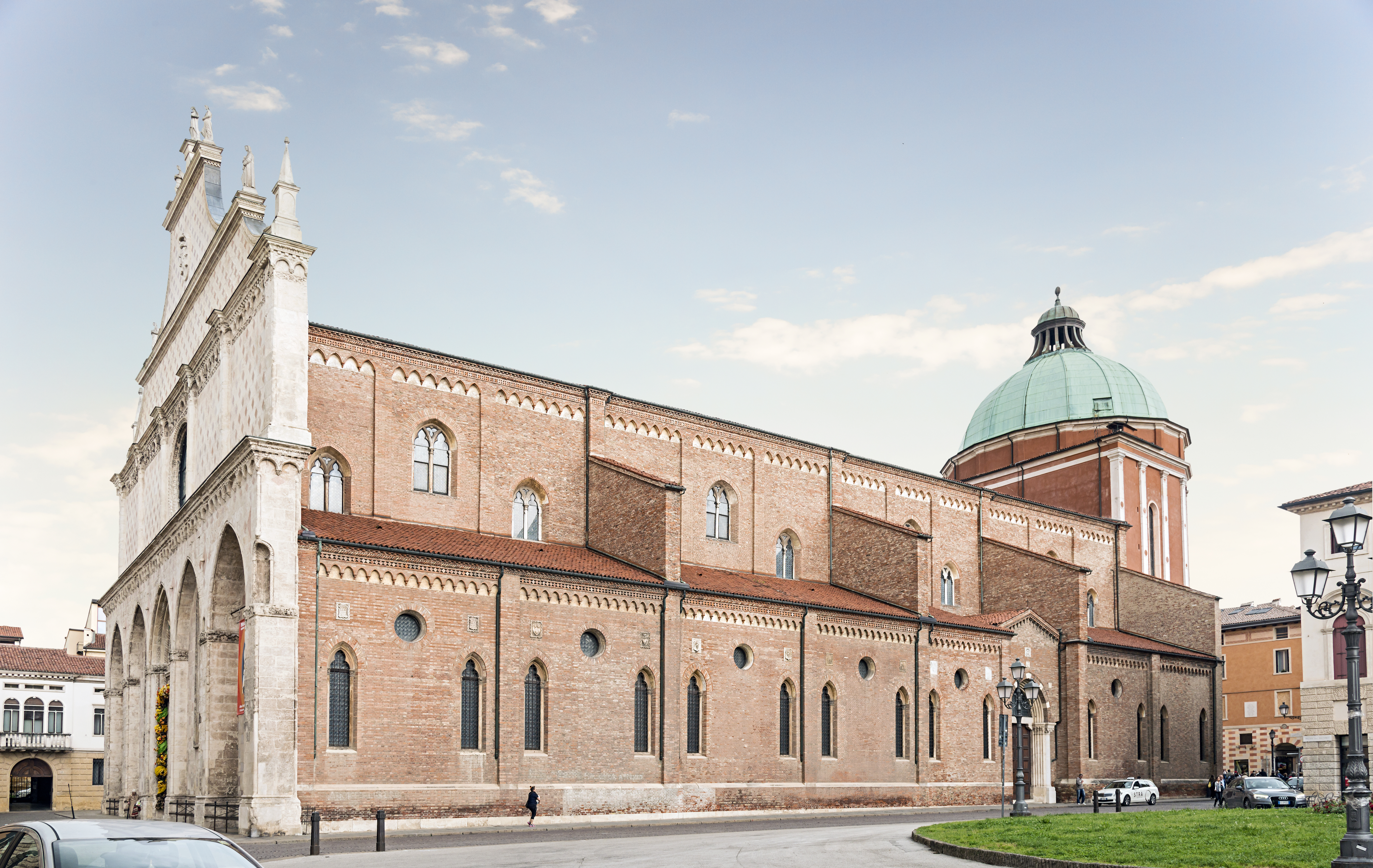
- Vicenza Cathedral

Location
- Country: Italy
- Ecclesiastical province: Venice

Statistics
- Area: 2,200 km^{2} (850 sq mi)
- Population: Total; Catholics: (as of 2023); 839,974 ▼; 769,000 (guess) ▼
- Parishes: 355

Information
- Denomination: Catholic Church
- Rite: Roman Rite
- Established: 6th Century
- Cathedral: Cattedrale di S. Maria Annunziata
- Secular priests: 386 (diocesan) ▼152 (Religious Orders) ▼51 Permanent Deacons ▲

Current leadership
- Pope: Leo XIV
- Bishop: Giuliano Brugnotto
- Bishops emeritus: Beniamino Pizziol

Map

Website
- www.vicenza.chiesacattolica.it

The Diocese of Vicenza (Latin: Dioecesis Vicentina) is a Latin diocese of the Catholic Church in Italy. It is located in the region of the Veneto, and is the capital of the Province of Vicenza, approximately 60 km (37 mi) west of Venice, and around 45 km (28 mi) east of Verona. The diocese was in existence before 590. Vicenza was a suffragan of the Patriarchate of Aquileia until 1751. In 1751 it was transferred to the ecclesiastical province of Udine. In 1818, upon the dissolution of the ecclesiastical province of Udine, Vicenza was made a suffragan of the Patriarchate of Venice.

== History ==
The city of Vicenza honors among its patron saints, St. Leontius, bishop and martyr, and St. Theodore and St. Apollonius, bishops and confessors of the fourth century. A Christian cemetery, discovered near the Church of Sts. Felix and Fortunatus, dates from the earlier half of the fourth century, and these two men may have been martyred under Diocletian.

The first bishop of whom there is any certain record is (H)orontius (590), who was involved in the struggles of the Schism of the Three Chapters.

On 19 July 1001, the Emperor Otto III issued a charter to Bishop Hieronymus, granting him and his successors possession of the entire County of Vicenza, with all the rights of jurisdiction. The grant was confirmed by Henry II in 1008. According to Ughelli, Bishop Girolamo was deposed by Emperor Henry II as a perjurer and apostate.

Other bishops were: Torengo (c. 1113–1117), who ruled Vicenza both in spiritual and temporal affairs, against the nobles and magistrates who rebelled against episcopal authority, disturbing the city for a quarter century. In March 1116, the Emperor Henry V held a judicial assize in Vicenza in an attempt to settle the differences. On 3 January 1117, Bishop Torengo was present when the Emperor issued a charter taking the church of S. Severus of Mundiburdio under his protection.

Bishop Uberto (1204–1212) was deposed by the papal legate, Bishop Sighard of Cremona, as a despoiler of church property. After having been given several opportunities to present himself to the legate and explain his conduct, and having failed to do so, his deposition by the legate was confirmed by Pope Innocent III. Pope Innocent specified that the canons of the cathedral should elect a successor within a month, but the canons did not do so. Pope Innocent responded by appointing Bishop Nicolaus Maltraversi on 8 April 1213. Bishop Gilberto, who was elected by the canons on 3 June 1219, was forced by the tyranny of Ezzelino to live in exile.

During the administration of Bishop Emiliani (1409–1433) took place the alleged apparition of the Blessed Virgin on Monte Berico which led to the foundation of the famous sanctuary. The church was made a minor basilica in 1904, by Pope Pius X.

Pietro Barbo (1451–1459) was afterwards elected Pope Paul II.

Cardinal Giovanni Battista Zeno (1470–1501), a grand-nephew of Pope Eugenius II and nephew of Pope Paul II, was distinguished for his learning, but although he was named Bishop of Vicenza in 1470, he did not take possession of the diocese until 1478. Matteo Priuli (1565–1579) founded the seminary.

=== Chapter and cathedral ===
The cathedral was administered and served by a corporation called the Chapter, which consisted of three dignities (the Provost, the Archdeacon, and the Archpriest) and twelve canons. The dignity of Provost was suppressed in the 1343, when Pope Benedict XI ordered the reduction of canons to ten. Two of the canons served as Theologus and Penitentiarius, in accordance with the decrees of the Council of Trent.

In February 1839, ominous sounds were heard coming from the vaulting of the cathedral; when it was heard twice again, it became necessary to close the cathedral. After extensive restoration, the building was reopened to the public on 25 March 1848.

Bishop Matteo Priuli (1565–1579) held a diocesan synod in 1565, and another on 2 December 1566, citing the decree of the Council of Trent that diocesan synods should be held annually. In 1583, Bishop Michele Priuli (1579–1603) presided over a diocesan synod in Vicenza. Bishop Dionisio Delfino (1606–1626) presided over a diocesan synod in Vicenza in 1611. He held another synod on 2–3 October 1623. On 8 May 1647, Cardinal Marcantonio Bragadin (1639–1655) held a diocesan synod. Bishop Giuseppe Civran (1660–1679) held a diocesan synod in the cathedral in 1666.

Bishop Giambattista Rubini (1684–1702) held a diocesan synod in Vicenza on 5–7 May 1689.

=== Provincial reorganizations ===
The diocese of Vicenza was suffragan of the Patriarchate of Aquileia until 1751. The ecclesiastical province of Aquileia was subject to repeated troubles, both internal and external, due partly to the fact that the eastern dioceses of the province (Istria) were politically subject to Austria, while the western dioceses (Veneto) were subject to the Venetian Republic. Both powers had repeated clashes with the Papacy in policy and administration. The War of the Austrian Succession (1740–1748) produced a crisis, since both Venice and the Papacy supported Charles Albert of Bavaria, while Austria supported Maria Theresa, daughter of Charles VI, Holy Roman Emperor. The Austrian government retaliated by sequestering all church benefices in its territories. At the conclusion of the war, both Austria and Venice demanded a resolution of the ecclesiastical problems. Pope Benedict, in letters of 29 November 1749 and 27 June 1750, invited the two parties to come to an agreement, while for the moment the present arrangements would remain in effect. On 6 April 1751, replies from Austria and Venice were presented to the pope, in the form of a convention between the parties, with the demand that the pope implement it. The patriarchate of Aquileia was abolished, as Article I of their convention required, and was replaced by two ecclesiastical provinces and two archbishoprics on equal footing: Udine and Gorizia. It was agreed that Cardinal Daniele Delfino would retain the title of Patriarch of Aquileia for his lifetime. Benedict XIV granted the empress of Austria and her successors the right to nominate the archbishop of Gorizia, and the doge of Venice and his successors the right to nominate to a vacancy at Udine. Vicenza was transferred to the ecclesiastical province of Udine.

=== Post-Napoleonic reorganization ===
The violent expansionist military policies of the French Revolutionary Republic had brought confusion and dislocation to the Po Valley. Following the redistribution of European territories at the Congress of Vienna, the Papacy faced the difficult task of restoring and restructuring the Church in various territories, according to the wishes of their rulers. Padua and Venice were under the control of Austria, and therefore a Concordat had to be negotiated with the government of the Emperor Francis. One of the requirements of the Austrian government was the elimination of several metropolitanates and the suppression of a number of bishoprics which were no longer viable due to the bad climate (malaria and cholera) and the impoverishment of the dioceses due to migration and industrialization; it was expected that this would be done to the benefit of the Patriarchate of Venice.

Pope Pius VII, therefore, issued the bull "De Salute Dominici Gregis" on 1 May 1818, embodying the conclusions of arduous negotiations. The metropolitan archbishopric of Udine was abolished and its bishop made suffragan to Venice. The dioceses of Caprularum (Caorle) and Torcella were suppressed and their territories assigned to the Patriarchate of Venice; Belluno and Feltre were united under a single bishop, aeque personaliter, and assigned to Venice; Vicenza became a suffragan of Venice. In the adjustment of diocesan boundaries made necessary by the suppression and realignment of dioceses, Vicenza gained ten parishes from the diocese of Padua, but also lost seven parishes to Padua.

=== Statistics ===
Around 1700, the city of Vicenza had a population of c. 34,000 people, with 15 parishes, 18 houses of male religious, and 14 houses of female religious. In an official report to the Congregation of the Council in the Roman Curia on 9 August 1741, the diocese of Vicenza claimed responsibility for 217, 963 persons. Around 1900, the diocese had 219 parishes, with 477,000 members; 699 secular and 39 regular priests; 10 houses of male religious and 52 sisters; 4 schools for boys, and 52 for girls. The Catholic Press comprised "Il Berico" (tri- weekly, Vicenza), "La Riscossa" (tri-weekly, Breganze), and six other periodicals.

== Bishops ==
=== to 1200 ===
...

- Orontius (attested 589)

...

- Reginaldus (attested 813)
- Andreas (attested 820)
- Franco (attested 827)

...

- Aicardus (attested 872–882)
- Vitalis (attested 901)

...

- Giraldus (attested 956)
- Ambrosius (attested 962)
- Rodulfus (attested 967–977)
- Lambertus (attested 995–996)
- Hieronymus (attested 1000–1013 deposed)
- Teudald (attested 1013–1027)
- Aistulf (attested 1033–1050)
- Liudigerius (attested 1060–1068)
- Bernardus (1070s)
- Didalus (attested 1080)
- Etzelo (Hecelin) (attested 1081–1104)
- Toringus (attested 1113–1117)
- Henricus (attested 1123–1131)
- Lotharius (attested 1134–1154)
- Ubertus (attested 1158)
- Aribertus (attested 1164–1177)
- Joannes Cacciafronte, O.S.B. (attested 1179–1184)
- Pistor, O.S.A. (attested 1184–1200)

=== 1200 to 1500 ===
- Uberto (attested 1204–1212)
- Nicolaus Maltraversi (1213-1219)
- Gilbertus (1219–1227)
- Jacobus (1227– )
- Manfredus (1232–1255)
- Bartholomaeus, O.P. (1255–1270)
- Bernardus Nicelli (1271–1286)
- Petrus Saraceni (1287–1295)
- Andreas Mozzi (1295–1296)
- Rinaldo da Concorezzo (1296–1303)
- Altogradus Cattaneo (1303–1314)
- Sperandio (1315–1321)
- Franciscus Temprarini, O.S.B. (1321–1335)
- Biagio de Leonessa, O.Min. (1335–1347)
- Egidio Blasii, O.E.S.A. (1347–1361)
- Joannes de Surdis (1363–1386)
- Joannes (1388– ) Avignon Obedience
- Nicolaus (1387) Roman Obedience
- Pietro Filargis, O.F.M. (1388–1389) Roman Obedience
- Joannes Castiglione (1390–1409) Roman Obedience
- Petrus Aemiliani (1409–1433)
- Francesco Malipiero, O.S.B. (1433–1451 Died)
- Pietro Barbo (1451–1464 Elected Pope)
- Marco Barbo (1464–1470)
- Giovanni Battista Zeno (1470–1501)

=== 1500 to 1810 ===
- Pietro Dandolo (1501–1507)
- Galeotto Franciotti della Rovere (1507)
- Sisto Gara della Rovere (Franciotti) (1507–1508)
- Francesco della Rovere (1509–1514 Appointed Bishop of Volterra)
- Francesco Soderini (1514–1524 Resigned)
- Niccolò Ridolfi (1524–1550 Died)
- Angelo Bragadino, O.P. (1550–1560 Died)
- Giulio della Rovere (1560–1565 Resigned)
- Matteo Priuli (1565–1579 Resigned)
- Michele Priuli (1579–1603 Died)
- Giovanni Delfino (1603–1606 Resigned)
- Dionisio Delfino (1606–1626 Died)
- Federico Baldissera Bartolomeo Cornaro (1626–1629 Appointed Bishop of Padua)
- Luca Stella (1632–1639 Appointed Archbishop (Personal Title) of Padua)
- Marcantonio Bragadin (1639–1655 Resigned)
- Giovanni Battista Brescia (1655–1660 Died)
- Giuseppe Civran (1660–1679)
- Giambattista Rubini (1684–1702 Resigned)
- Sebastiano Venieri (1702–1738)
- Antonio Maria Priuli (1738–1767)
- Marco Giuseppe Cornaro (Corner) (1767–1779)
- Alvise Maria Gabrielli (1779–1785)
- Marco Zaguri (1785–1810)

=== Since 1810 ===
- Giuseppe Maria Peruzzi (1818–1830 Died)
- Giovanni Giuseppe Cappellari (1832–1860 Died)
- Giovanni Antonio Farina (1860–1888)
- Antonio Maria De Pol (1888–1892 Died)
- Antonio Feruglio (1893–1911 Resigned)
- Ferdinando Rodolfi (1911–1943 Died)
- Carlo Zinato (1943–1971 Retired)
- Arnoldo Onisto (1971–1988 Retired)
- Pietro Giacomo Nonis (1988–2003 Retired)
- Cesare Nosiglia, Archbishop (personal title) (2003–2010 Appointed Archbishop of Turin)
- Beniamino Pizziol (16 Apr 2011 – 2022)
- Giuliano Brugnotto (23 Sep 2022 - )

== See also ==
- Timeline of Vicenza
- History of religious architecture in Vicenza
- History of religious life in Vicenza

== Sources ==
=== Episcopal lists ===
- Eubel, Conradus, ed. (1913). Hierarchia catholica (in Latin). Vol. 1 (second ed.). Münster: Libreria Regensbergiana.
- Eubel, Conradus, ed. (1914). Hierarchia catholica. Vol. 2 (second ed.). Münster: Libreria Regensbergiana.
- Eubel, Conradus; Gulik, Guilelmus, eds. (1923). Hierarchia catholica (in Latin). Vol. 3 (second ed.). Münster: Libreria Regensbergiana.
- Gams, Pius Bonifatius (1873). Series episcoporum Ecclesiae catholicae: quotquot innotuerunt a beato Petro apostolo (in Latin). Ratisbon: Typis et Sumptibus Georgii Josephi Manz.
- Gauchat, Patritius (Patrice) (1935). Hierarchia catholica. Vol. IV (1592-1667). Münster: Libraria Regensbergiana.
- Ritzler, Remigius; Sefrin, Pirminus (1952). Hierarchia catholica medii et recentis aevi (in Latin). Vol. V (1667-1730). Patavii: Messagero di S. Antonio.
- Ritzler, Remigius; Sefrin, Pirminus (1958). Hierarchia catholica medii et recentis aevi (in Latin). Vol. VI (1730-1799). Patavii: Messagero di S. Antonio.
- Ritzler, Remigius; Sefrin, Pirminus (1968). Hierarchia Catholica medii et recentioris aevi (in Latin). Vol. VII (1800–1846). Monasterii: Libreria Regensburgiana.
- Remigius Ritzler; Pirminus Sefrin (1978). Hierarchia catholica Medii et recentioris aevi (in Latin). Vol. VIII (1846–1903). Il Messaggero di S. Antonio.
- Pięta, Zenon (2002). Hierarchia catholica medii et recentioris aevi (in Latin). Vol. IX (1903–1922). Padua: Messagero di San Antonio. ISBN 978-88-250-1000-8.

=== Studies ===
- Benigni, Umberto (1912). "Diocese of Vicenza". The Catholic Encyclopedia. New York: Robert Appleton Company.
- Cappelletti, Giuseppe (1854), Le chiese d'Italia Volume decimo (10) Venezia. Giuseppe Antonelli, pp. 819–956. (in Italian)
- Gualdo, Germano (1956). "Contributo alla cronologia dei vescovi di Vicenza dal secolo VI a tutto il XII," (in Italian), in: Rivista di storia della chiesa in Italia Vol. 10 (Roma 1956), pp. 1–48.
- Kehr, Paul Fridolin (1923). Italia Pontificia Vol. VII:l Venetiae et Histria, Pars I: Provincia Aquileiensis. Berlin: Weidmann. pp. 124–152. (in Latin).
- Lanzoni, Francesco (1927). Le diocesi d'Italia dalle origini al principio del secolo VII (an. 604). Faenza: F. Lega, pp. 917–919. (in Italian)
- Magrini, Antonio (1848). Notizie storico-descrittive della Chiesa cattedrale di Vicenza raccolte e pubblicate dall'abate Antonio Magrini nella solenne riapertura della medesima li 25 marzo 1848. (in Italian). Vicenza: tipi Paroni G. Tramontini, 1848.
- Savi, Ignazio (1818). Notizia compendiosa dei vescovi vicentini. (in Italian). Vicenza: Tipografia Paroni, 1818.
- Schwartz, Gerhard (1907). Die Besetzung der Bistümer Reichsitaliens unter den sächsischen und salischen Kaisern: mit den Listen der Bischöfe, 951-1122. Leipzig: B.G. Teubner. pp. 70–73. (in German)
- Riccardi, Tommaso (1786). Storia Dei Vescovi Vicentini (in Italian). Vicenza: Vendramini Mosca.
- Ughelli, Ferdinando; Coleti, Niccolo (1720). Italia sacra sive de Episcopis Italiae (in Latin). Vol. 5. Venice: Apud Sebastianum Coleti. pp. 1025–1070.
