= Antonio Maria Priuli =

Italian Roman Catholic cardinal

- Cardinal-Priest of San Marco; Bishop of Padova
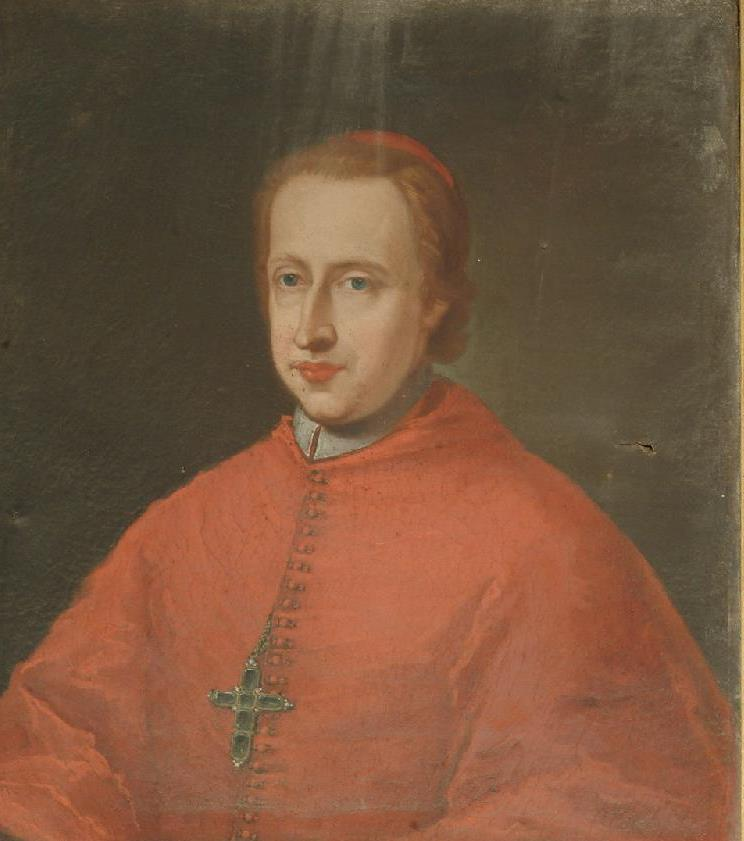
- Church: Catholic Church
- In office: 1762–1772

Orders
- Consecration: 18 Jan 1739 by Pietro Ottoboni
- Created cardinal: 2 Oct 1758
- Rank: Cardinal Priest

Personal details
- Born: 17 Aug 1707 at sea on the way to Venice
- Died: 26 Oct 1772 (age 65)

Antonio Maria Priuli (1707–1772) was a Roman Catholic cardinal who served as Cardinal-Priest of San Marco (1762–1772), Bishop of Padova (1767–1772), Cardinal-Priest of Santa Maria della Pace (1759–1762), and Bishop of Vicenza (1738–1767).

== External links and additional sources ==
- Cheney, David M. "Diocese of Padova {Padua}". Catholic-Hierarchy.org. (for Chronology of Bishops) ^{[self-published]}
- Chow, Gabriel. "Diocese of Padova (Italy)". GCatholic.org. (for Chronology of Bishops) ^{[self-published]}
- Cheney, David M. "Diocese of Vicenza". Catholic-Hierarchy.org. (for Chronology of Bishops) ^{[self-published]}
- Chow, Gabriel. "Diocese of Vicenza". GCatholic.org. (for Chronology of Bishops) ^{[self-published]}
