= Diocese of Susa (Italy) =

Roman Catholic diocese in Italy

Coordinates: 45.1372°N 7.0446°E

Diocese of Susa Dioecesis Segusiensis

Catholic
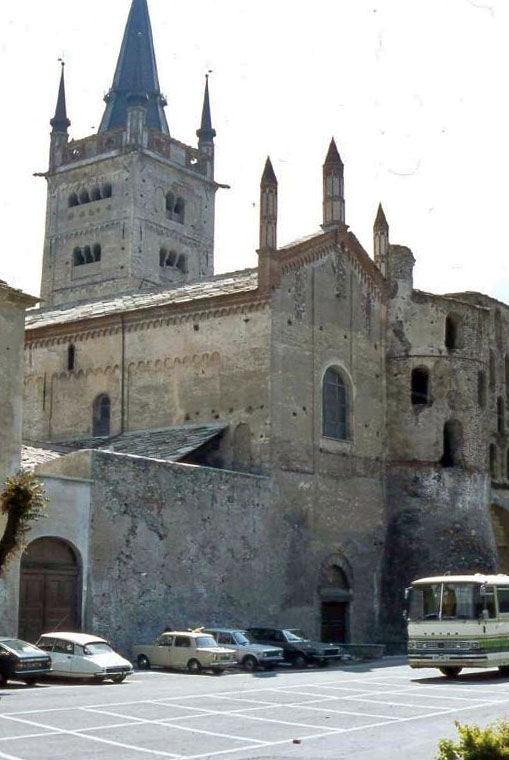
- Susa Cathedral

Location
- Country: Italy
- Ecclesiastical province: Turin

Statistics
- Area: 1,062 km^{2} (410 sq mi)
- Population: Total; Catholics: (as of 2020); 82,740; 74,466 (90.0%)
- Parishes: 61

Information
- Denomination: Catholic Church
- Rite: Roman Rite
- Established: 3 August 1772
- Cathedral: Cathedral of Saint Justus
- Secular priests: 36 (diocesan); 4 (Religious Orders); 2 Permanent Deacons

Current leadership
- Pope: Leo XIV
- Bishop: Roberto Repole
- Bishops emeritus: Alfonso Badini Confalonieri

Map

Website
- http://www.diocesidisusa.it/

The Diocese of Susa (Latin: Dioecesis Segusiensis) is a Latin diocese of the Catholic Church in Piedmont (Italy) that was established in 1772. It is a suffragan of the archdiocese of Turin. The diocese and the city of Susa lie on the main route that leads to Italy from the Mont Cenis Pass and the Col de Montgenèvre.

== History ==
In early medieval days, Susa seems to have belonged to the Diocese of Maurienne, and was not separated from it until after the conquest of Italy by Charlemagne in 784. The Abbey of St. Justus having been erected in 1029, the abbot had quasi-episcopal jurisdiction. The Benedictines were succeeded by the Canons Regular, and under Pope Benedict XIV the Canons Regular were replaced by secular canons. He ordered that they form a Collegiate Chapter, consisting of four dignities (Archdeacon, Archpriest, Provost, and Treasurer) and fourteen Canons.

On 3 August 1772 a diocese was created by Pope Clement XIV in the bull Quod nobis out of this prelacy nullius, ex monasterio abbatia nuncupato Sancti Justi oppidi civitatis nuncupati Secusii nullius dioecesis provinciae Taurensis, and the territory of Novalesa Abbey was added to that of Susa. The Pope also ordered his representative, Cardinal Carlo Vittorio Amedeo delle Lanze, to acquire properties which had belonged to the Canons of S. Giusto to be used for a new diocesan seminary, in accordance with the decrees of the Council of Trent. The first bishop was Giuseppe Francesco Ferraris. Napoleon suppressed the see in 1803, but it was restored in 1817, and its territory increased by the inclusion of the Abbey of S. Michele della Chiusa.

The most famous native son of the province of Susa is Cardinal Enrico de Seguso, known as '(H)Ostiensis', the most distinguished canonist of his age. He had been a professor of law at Bologna and then at Paris. He was Bishop of Sisteron (1244), Archbishop of Embrun (1250), and then Cardinal Bishop of Ostia (1261). Though mortally ill, he participated in the longest papal election in history, that of 1268–1271. He was the author of the great commentary on Canon Law, the Aurea Summa Hostiensis, whose influence lasted into the 16th century and beyond.

A number of popes have visited Susa, including: Paschal II (1106); Calixtus II, who was travelling to Rome from his election following the death of Gelasius II at Cluny; Eugene III (7 March 1147); Innocent IV (12 November 1244); and John Paul II (July 1991).

=== French occupation ===
When the French revolution guillotined King Louis XVI, King Victor Amadeus III of Sardinia declared war on the French Republic, but in three successive engagements, the Battle of Montenotte (12 April 1796), the Battle of Millesimo (13–14 April 1796) and the Battle of Mondovi (21 April 1796), General Napoleon Bonaparte defeated the Piedmontese. In suing for peace, Victor Amadeus was forced to cede Savoy and Nice to France. The territory, including the diocese of Susa, became part of the Department of Mont-Blanc. King Victor Amadeus died on 18 October 1796, and his son and successor, Carlo Emanuele was forced to abdicate on 6 December 1798. The King retreated to the Island of Sardinia.

The French government, in the guise of ending the practices of feudalism, confiscated the incomes and benefices of the bishops and priests, and made them employees of the state, with a fixed income and the obligation to swear an oath of loyalty to the French constitution. Monasteries, convents, and Chapters were suppressed. Following the Concordat of 1801 between Bonaparte and Pope Pius VII, the Pope issued a bull, Gravissimis causis (1 June 1803), in which the number of dioceses in Piedmont was reduced to eight: Turin, Vercelli, Ivrea, Acqui, Asti, Mondovi, Alessandria and Saluzzo. The vacant diocese of Susa was suppressed and united with the diocese of Turin. Bishop Ferraris, the first bishop of Susa had been transferred to the diocese of Saluzzo on 11 August 1800.

=== Restoration ===
When the duchy of Savoy was restored to the kings of Sardinia by the Congress of Vienna, the confused situation of the dioceses in Piedmont was addressed by Pope Pius VII in his bull, Beati Petri (17 July 1817), restoring the diocese of Susa. The Chapter of the cathedral was restored as well, and in 1858 it had two dignities (Archdeacon and Provost) and eleven Canons.

== Bishops ==
- Giuseppe Francesco Maria Ferraris (1778–1800)

Sede vacante (1800–1817)

- Giuseppe Prin (1817–1822)
- Francesco Lombardi (1824–1830)

Sede vacante (1830–1832)

- Pietro Cirio (1832–1838)
- Pio Forzani (1839–1844)
- Giovanni Antonio Odone (1845–1866)

Sede vacante (1866–1872)

- Federico Mascaretti, O.Carm. (1872–1877)
- Edoardo Giuseppe Rosaz (31 Dec 1877 - 3 May 1903)
- Carlo Marozio (1903–1910)
- Giuseppe Castelli (1911–1921)
- Umberto Rossi (1921–1932)
- Umberto Ugliengo (1932–1953)
- Giuseppe Garneri (1954–1976)
- Vittorio Bernardetto (1978–2000)
- Alfonso Badini Confalonieri (2000–2019)
- Cesare Nosiglia (2019-2022)
- Roberto Repole (19 February 2022 – present)

== Parishes ==
The diocese contains 61 parishes covering an area of 1,062 km^{2}, all of which fall within the Province of Turin.

== Books ==
=== References ===
- Dizionario Corografico-Universale Dell' Italia (in Italian). Vol. secondo, parte prima. Milano: Civelli Giuseppe e Comp. 1854. pp. 1067–1080.
- Gams, Pius Bonifatius (1873). Series episcoporum Ecclesiae catholicae: quotquot innotuerunt a beato Petro apostolo. Ratisbon: Typis et Sumptibus Georgii Josephi Manz. p. 823. (in Latin)
- Ritzler, Remigius; Sefrin, Pirminus (1958). Hierarchia catholica medii et recentis aevi. Vol. Tomus VI (1730-1799). Patavii: Messagero di S. Antonio. (in Latin)
- Ritzler, Remigius; Sefrin, Pirminus (1968). Hierarchia Catholica medii et recentioris aevi sive summorum pontificum, S. R. E. cardinalium, ecclesiarum antistitum series... A pontificatu Pii PP. VII (1800) usque ad pontificatum Gregorii PP. XVI (1846) (in Latin). Vol. VII. Monasterii: Libr. Regensburgiana.
- Remigius Ritzler; Pirminus Sefrin (1978). Hierarchia catholica Medii et recentioris aevi... A Pontificatu PII PP. IX (1846) usque ad Pontificatum Leonis PP. XIII (1903) (in Latin). Vol. VIII. Il Messaggero di S. Antonio.
- Pięta, Zenon (2002). Hierarchia catholica medii et recentioris aevi... A pontificatu Pii PP. X (1903) usque ad pontificatum Benedictii PP. XV (1922) (in Latin). Vol. IX. Padua: Messagero di San Antonio. ISBN 978-88-250-1000-8.

=== Studies ===
- La Basilica di San Giusto: la memoria millenaria della cattedrale segusina : atti del convegno, Chiesa Cattedrale di San Giusto in Susa, 21 ottobre 2000 (in Italian). Susa: Centro culturale diocesano. 2002.
- Cappelletti, Giuseppe (1858). Le chiese d'Italia: dalla loro origine sino ai nostri giorni (in Italian). Vol. decimoquarto (XIV). Venice: G. Antonelli. pp. 327–344.
- Garneri, Giuseppe (1985). Tra Rischi e pericoli: Fatti e testimonianze nel periodo della Resistenza, della Liberazione e della persecuzione contro gli Ebrei. 2nd ed. Pinerolo: Alzani, 1985. (in Italian)
- Savio, Fedele (1899). Gli antichi Vescovi d'Italia: il Piemonte (in Italian). Torino: Bocca. p. 583.
- Ughelli, Ferdinando; Coleti, Niccolo (1719). Italia sacra sive de Episcopis Italiae (in Latin). Vol. Tomus quartus (IV) (secunda ed.). Apud Sebastianum Coleti. pp. 730–744.
