= Diocese of Aemona =

The diocese of Aemona was a Christian bishopric originally based in the Roman city of Aemona, located in today's Ljubljana, Slovenia. Today it is a titular see of the Roman Catholic Church.

== Residential diocese ==
Its bishop Maximus participated in the Council of Aquileia, 381, which condemned Arianism.

After the destruction of Aemona in the 7th century, the bishop's seat was transferred to Novigrad (Italian: Cittanova). In Latin the name Aemona continued to be used for the diocese.

Originally a suffragan of the Patriarchate of Aquileia, in 1272 it was attached instead to the ecclesiastical province and patriarchate of Grado, a patriarchate that in 1451 passed to Venice.

== Titular see ==
In 1828 Pope Leo XII abolished the see as a residential diocese with effect from the death of Bishop Teodoro Lauretano Balbi on 23 May 1831. Its territory then passed to the diocese of Trieste-Capodistria. The Second World War brought about a change of political borders and in 1977 what had been the territory of the diocese of Aemona or Cittanova became part of the Croatian diocese of Poreč and Pula.

No longer a residential bishopric, Aemona or Cittanova is today listed by the Catholic Church as a titular see.

== Legacy ==
Because of the connection of this Aemona with Istria, some have questioned whether the episcopal see is to be identified with the Emona or Aemona, whose site is now occupied by Ljubljana. It has even been argued that there were in fact three cities called by the same or similar names, the one that Pliny the Elder speaks of as a colonia in the province of Pannonia; another in the province of Noricum; and a third in Istria.
