= Cassino =

- Comune
- Città di Cassino
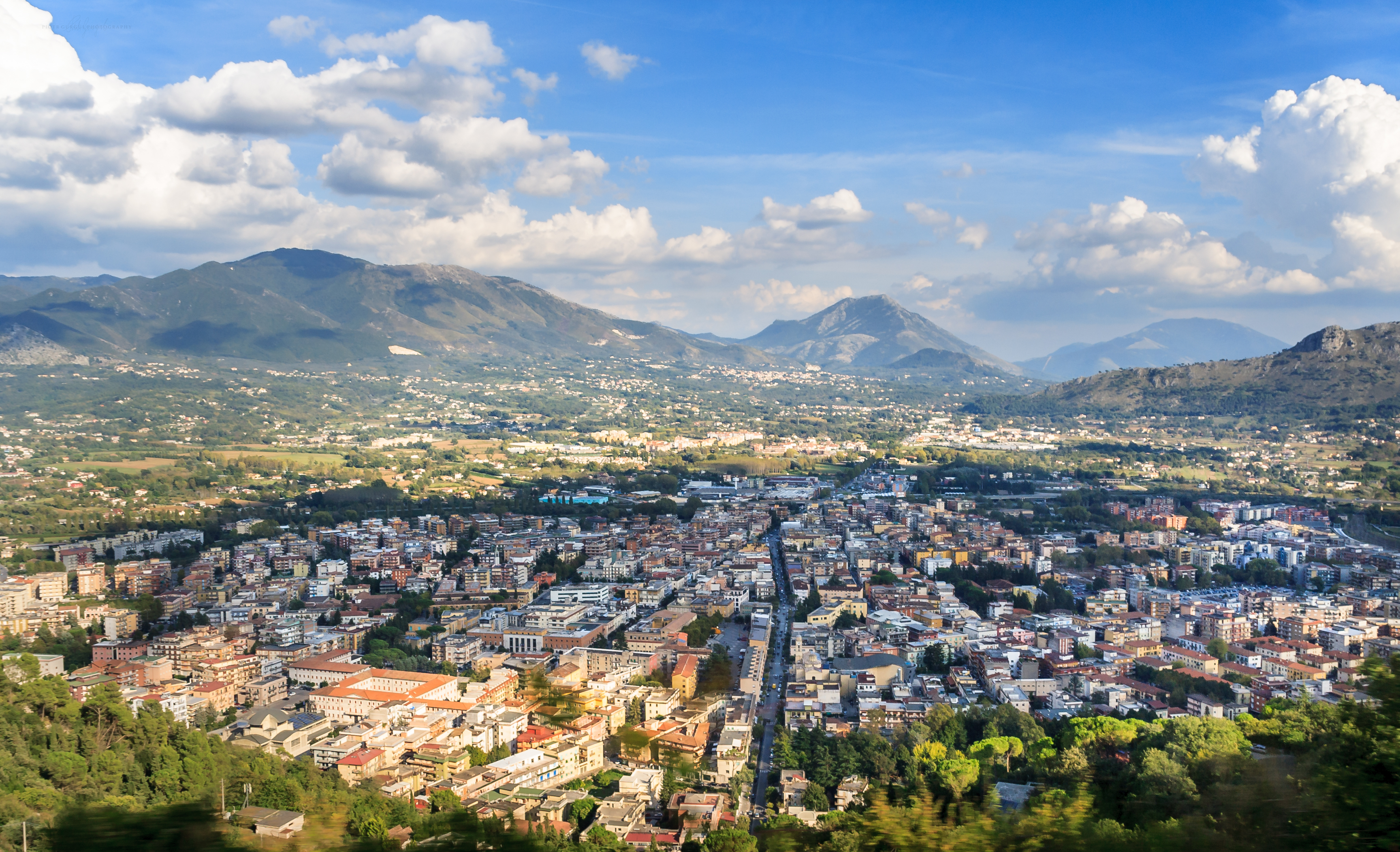
- The town of Cassino from the upper part of the town.

- Location within Italy Location within Lazio
- Coordinates: 41°29′23.924″N 13°49′59.38″E
- Country: Italy
- Region: Lazio
- Province: Frosinone (FR)
- Frazioni: Caira, Montecassino, San Cesareo, San Michele, San Pasquale, Sant'Angelo in Theodice, Sant'Antonino, San Bartolomeo

Government
  - Mayor: Enzo Salera

Area
  - Total: 83.42 km^{2} (32.21 sq mi)
- Elevation: 40 m (130 ft)

Population (31 July 2021)
  - Total: 35,969
  - Density: 431.2/km^{2} (1,117/sq mi)
- Demonym: Cassinati
- Time zone: UTC+1 (CET)
  - Summer (DST): UTC+2 (CEST)
- Postal code: 03043
- Dialing code: 0776
- Patron saint: St. Benedict
- Website: Official website

Cassino (Italian pronunciation: [kasˈsiːno]) is a comune in the province of Frosinone at the southern end of the region of Lazio. It is the southernmost city of the so-called "Latin Valley".

It is located at the foot of Monte Cairo near the confluence of the Gari and Liri rivers and on the via Casilina between Rome and Naples. The city is best known as the site of the Abbey of Montecassino and the Battle of Monte Cassino during World War II, which resulted in huge Allied and German casualties, as well as the nearly total destruction of the town itself. It is also home to the University of Cassino and Southern Lazio.

Cassino has a population of 35,969 as of July 2017, making it the second-largest town in the province.

Historical population
Year	Pop.	±%
1861	7,929	—
1871	12,540	+58.2%
1881	11,770	−6.1%
1901	13,397	+13.8%
1911	14,220	+6.1%
1921	19,001	+33.6%
1931	18,582	−2.2%
1936	20,064	+8.0%
1951	19,256	−4.0%
1961	21,105	+9.6%
1971	24,696	+17.0%
1981	31,462	+27.4%
1991	32,787	+4.2%
2001	32,762	−0.1%
2011	33,658	+2.7%
2021	35,235	+4.7%
Source: ISTAT

== History ==
=== Ancient ===
Cassino's roots lie in the settlement of Casinum, the last city of the Latins, of Umbrian or Venetic or Oscan origin, sited atop the hill of Cassino near Monte Cairo, 5 kilometres (3.1 miles) to the north. Casinum passed under the control of the Volscians first and then the Samnites, Eventually Sabini (a Volsci branch and Umbrian/Venetic origins) were defeated by the Romans that gained control of Casinum and its territory (ager casinas), establishing a fortified Latin colony there in 312 BC, Interamna Lirenas.

During the Roman era the most venerated god was Apollo, whose temple rose up on Montecassino, where today stands the abbey. At least once during Punic Wars, Hannibal passed near Casinum. Casinum was also the site of a villa presumed to belong to Marcus Terentius Varro.

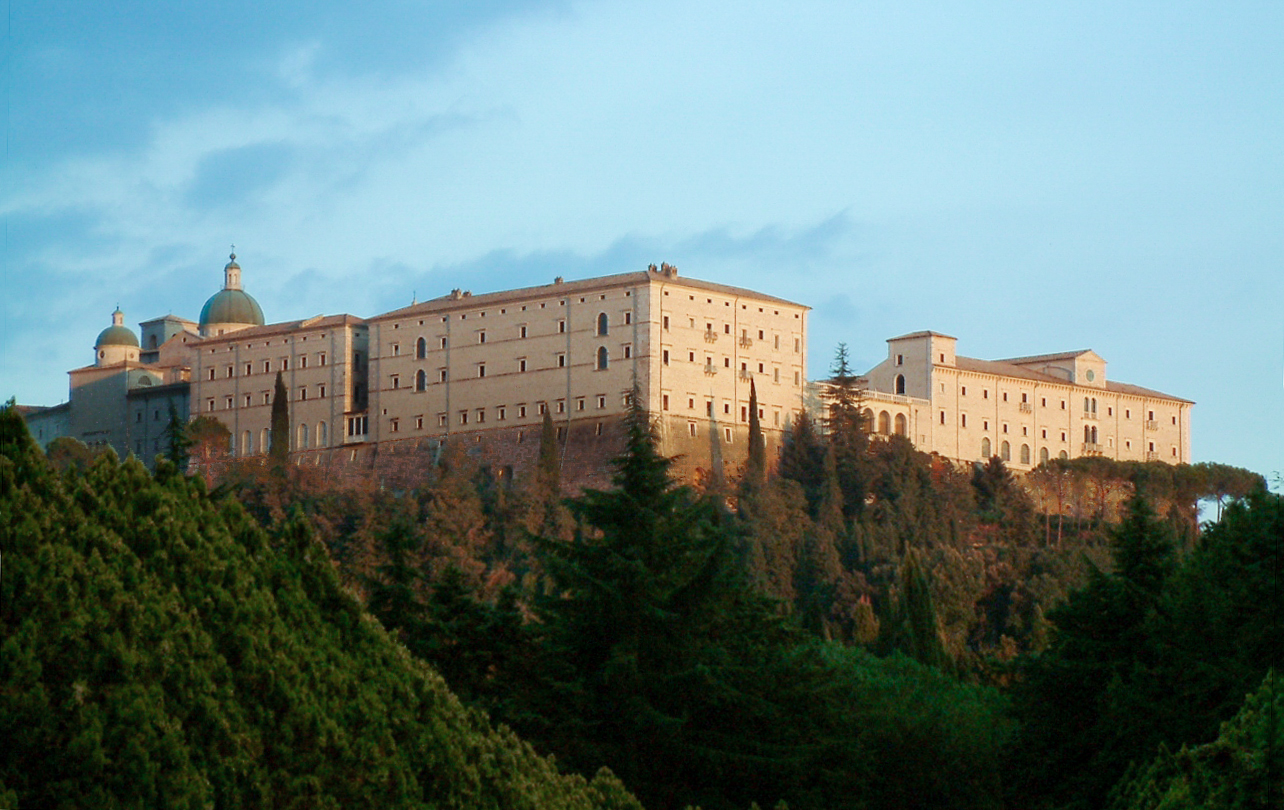
Abbey of Montecassino

=== Medieval ===
The ancient Casinum was deeply damaged by several barbarian raids. The book Dialogues, Pope Gregory I gives us the testimony of the Benedict of Nursia settlement among the ruins of Casinum Acropolis. He destroyed the image of Apollo and pagan altars, and sanctified the place in the name of St. John the Baptist. From that moment on, he would never leave Montecassino: he founded the monastery that became a model for the Western monasticism and one of the major cultural centers of Europe throughout the Middle Ages and wrote the "Rule", containing precepts for his monks. In the meanwhile the population built a village called Castellum Sancti Petri.

Because of their strategic position, the abbey and the village were involved in military events. In 577 a raid of the Lombards, led by Zotto, forced the monks to leave Monte Cassino to seek refuge in Rome. They came back only after more than a century. In 744, thanks to the donation of Gisulf II of Benevento, the monastery became the capital of a new state, called Terra Sancti Benedicti ("Land of Saint Benedict"). Few years later the town was re-founded by Abbot Bertharius and called Eulogimenopolis, meaning "city of Saint Benedict" in Greek. In 883 the monastery and the town were again attacked, this time by Saracens, and Bertharius was killed along with some other monks.

The abbey was again rebuilt in 949 by the decision of Pope Agapetus II and, together with the town, renamed San Germano (after Saint Germanus of Capua), began to experience a prosperous period. For defensive purposes, the castle Rocca Janula, which still dominates the town today, was also built. In the abbey are conserved the Placiti Cassinesi, dated 960–963, considered the first documents ever written in the Italian language. The abbey of San Germano had ceased to exist by the time of Abbot Richerius (1038–1055), when it was a parish church under an archpriest.

On July 23, 1230, the city was the site of the signing of the peace between Pope Gregory IX and Frederick II, which took place in the church of San Germano.

On 9 September 1349, San Germano was destroyed by a large earthquake, which also seriously damaged the abbey. The reconstruction took place in 1366, at Pope Urbano V's will.

=== Modern era ===
During the Renaissance era Cassino lay on the northern frontier of the Kingdom of Naples, which was dominated by Spain. In 1504, during the Second Italian War, the French attempted to capture the town in the Battle of Cassino, but failed.

On May 15–17, 1815, the town was the set of the final cruel battle of the Neapolitan War between an Austrian force commanded by Laval Nugent von Westmeath and the King of Naples, Joachim Murat. The so-called "Battle of San Germano" ended with the Austrian victory.

On July 28, 1863 the name of the town was officially reverted to "Cassino". In the same year the town was reached by the rail system. Cassino was part of the Province Terra di Lavoro (meaning "Land of Work") until 1927, when the Province of Frosinone was founded. On May 21, 1930 a cable car leading from the town to the Abbey in 7 minutes, covering a vertical drop of over 400 metres (1,300 ft), was inaugurated, but then dismissed.

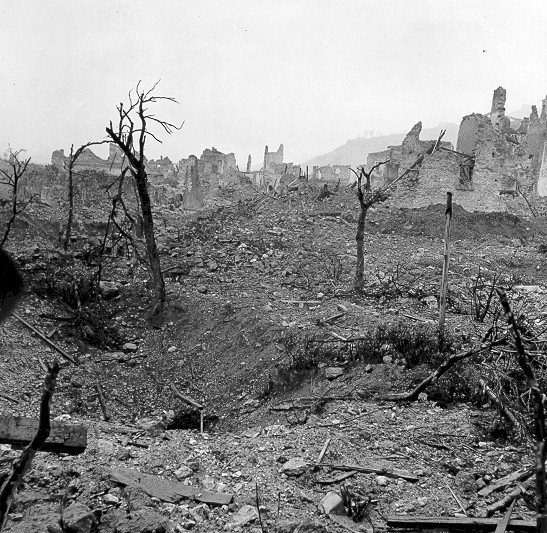
Ruins of Cassino after the bombing.

=== World War II and afterwards ===
In World War II, after southern Italy was invaded by the Allies, the Germans entrenched around the German Gustav Line, which, in its southern tip, was anchored around the mountains behind Cassino and made the town was the site of fierce fighting at the Battle of Monte Cassino. Allied troops were initially commanded to avoid destruction of a site that was deemed so culturally significant, but the human casualties became so great that permission given. On 15 February 1944, the Abbey was destroyed by a heavy aerial bombardment. The Allies, believing that the Abbey was a strategic position occupied by the Germans, bombed it and killed many of the people who had taken refuge. The works of art contained in the Abbey were transferred to Rome by the Germans before the bombing, but many disappeared on the way. On 15 March, the town was completely razed to the ground by aerial bombardment and artillery fire, followed by an unsuccessful Allied attack. 2,026 civilians, one-tenth of the town's entire population of 20,000, were killed by the bombing and fighting before and during the battles of Cassino.

Reconstruction lasted until the 1960s. During the months following the end of the war, the area was afflicted by a malaria epidemic. However, the population received also great solidarity from the rest of Italy in terms of donations and hospitality: many children were hosted by families in northern Italy in the years after the war. Cassino earned the Gold Medal of Military Valour, and had three war cemeteries built: the "Cassino War Cemetery", housing the Commonwealth victims; the Polish Cemetery; and the Germanic Cemetery.

The economy of the area was helped by the industrialization started with the settlement of the Fiat Cassino Plant and its satellite firms, the SKF plant and several paper factories as well as by the establishment of the University of Cassino.

Today, the town is commercially developed even though it has suffered in recent years from the crisis of the automotive sectors.

== Geography ==
Cassino is located at the southern end of the region of Lazio and at the northern end of the historical region called Terra di Lavoro. The city centre is set in a valley at the foot of Monte Cassino and Monte Cairo. Cassino is distant 123 km (76 mi) from Rome, 101 km (63 mi) from Naples, 28 km (17 mi) from the beach (Gulf of Gaeta) and 24 km (15 mi) from the Abruzzo, Lazio and Molise National Park.

The town is crossed by the Rivers Gari and Rapido that join themselves in the area of the Varronian Thermal Baths; forward, in the frazione of Sant'Angelo in Theodice, the Gari joins the Liri, becoming Garigliano, the river that marks the border between the regions Lazio and Campania.

=== Climate ===
Because of its valley location, Cassino is often foggy in the winter, with chilly rainfalls. Summers are generally quite warm and humid.

== Main sights ==
=== Abbey of Monte Cassino ===
Founded by St. Benedict in 529, the Abbey of Monte Cassino is one of the most famous monasteries in the world and is the source of the Benedictine Order. It has been destroyed four times in its millennial history, the last time in 1944 by Allied bombing. It has been rebuilt "Com'era, dov'era" ("How it was, where it was") after the war and was reconsecrated by Pope Paul VI in 1964.

=== Archaeological sites ===
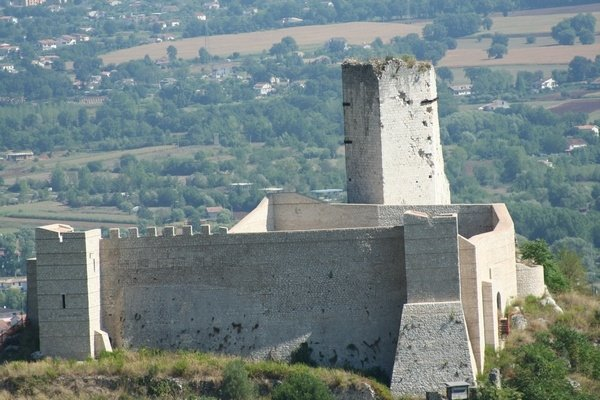
Rocca Janula.

- Casinum Roman city
- Roman theatre: still used in the summer for events, shows and concerts.
- Roman amphitheatre
- Part of the historical Via Latina
- Mausoleum of Ummidia Quadratilla
- Rocca Janula: a castle overlooking the city, which was one of Abbey's historical strongholds. Recently restored, it is not visitable.

=== War Cemeteries ===
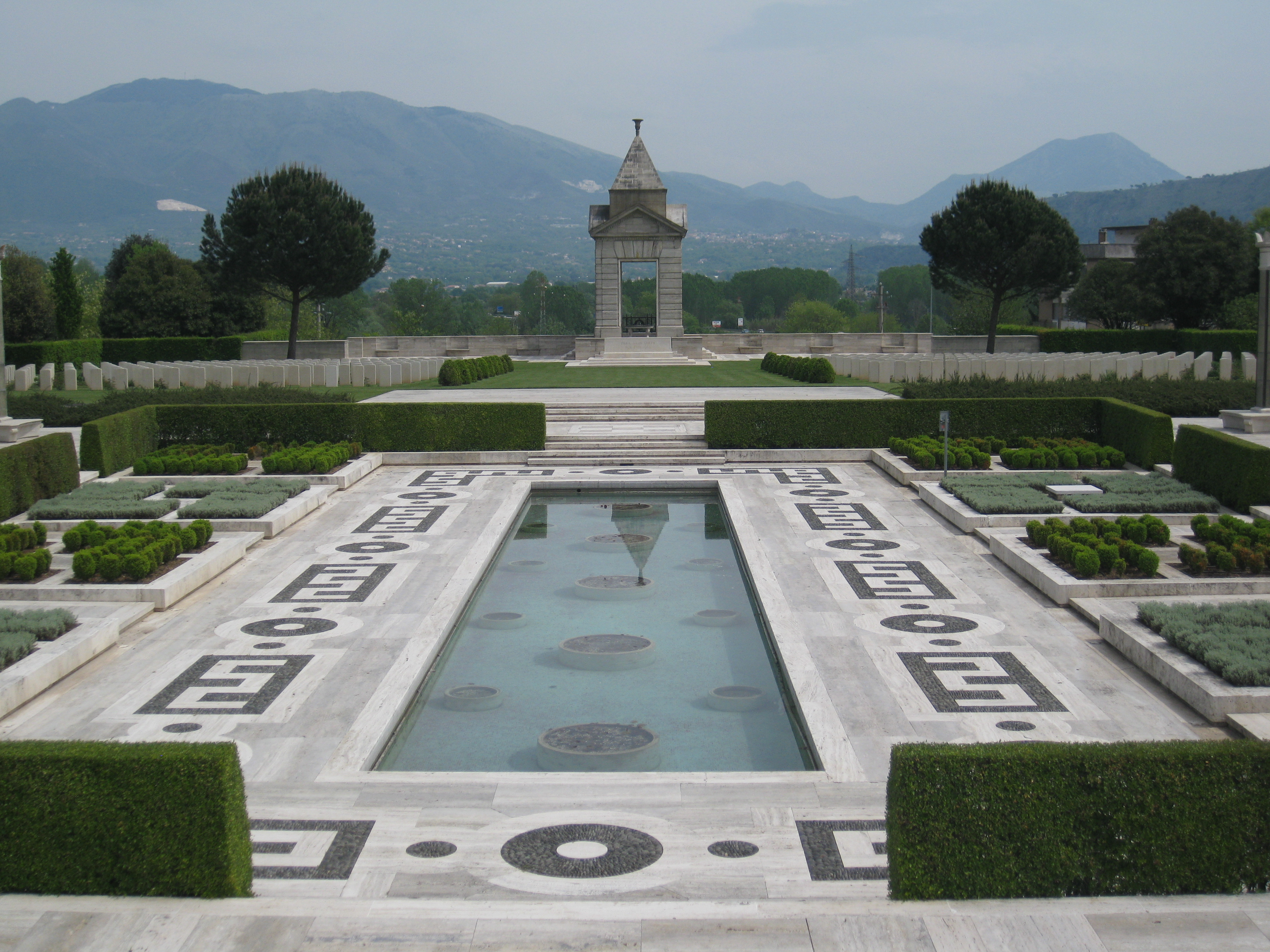
Inner part of Cassino War Cemetery.

- Cassino War Cemetery
- German War Cemetery
- Polish Cemetery

=== Natural areas ===
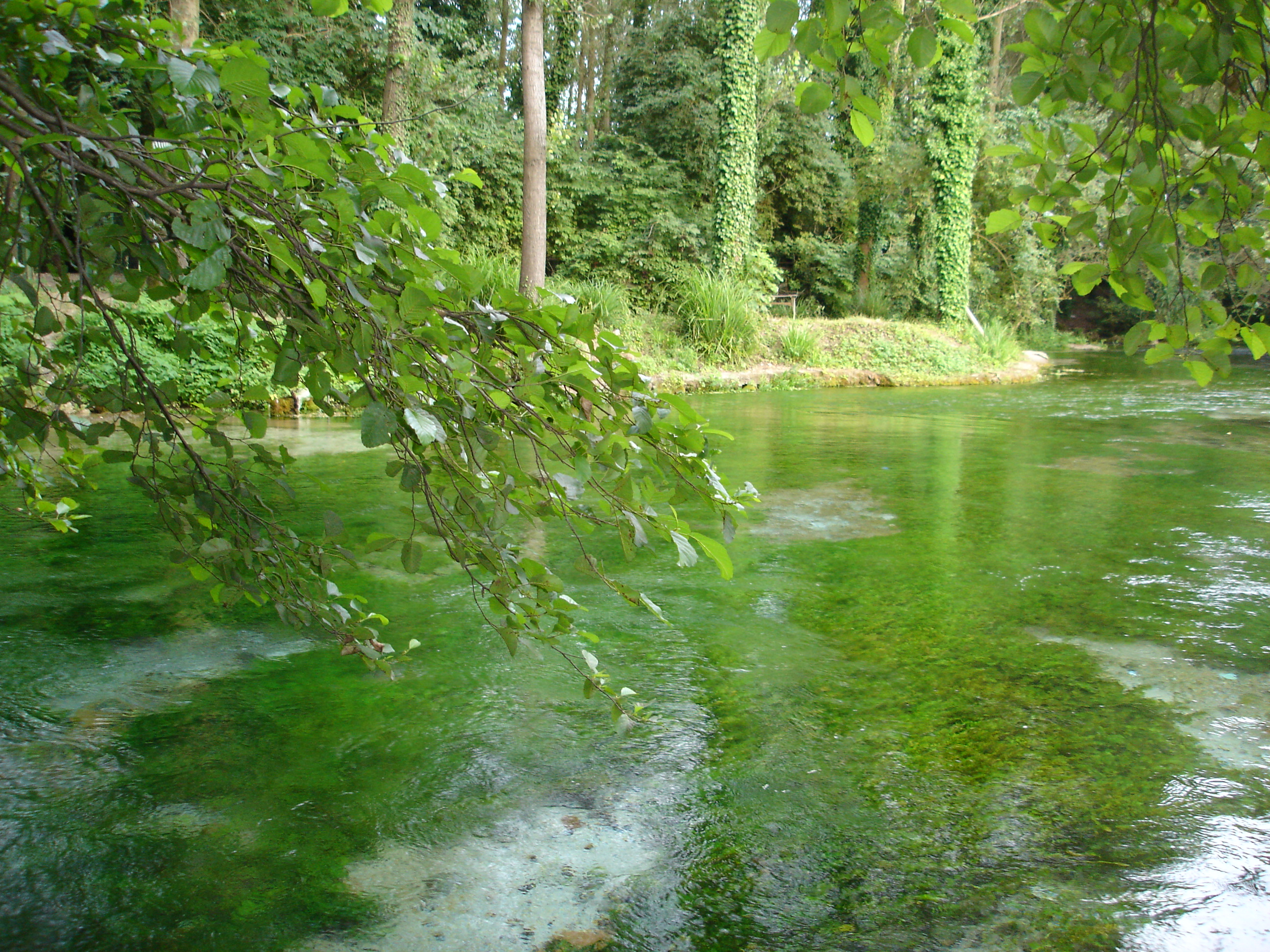
Spring water in Varronian Thermal Baths.

- Villa Comunale: it is the main public park in the town.
- Baden Powell Park: second public park, that host the main non profit associations and scout huts in the town.
- Varronian Thermal Baths: thermal area located where there used to be Marcus Terentius Varro's villa.

=== Museums ===
- Historiale: Second World War multimedial museum, created by Carlo Rambaldi.
- National Archaeological Museum "G. Carrettoni"
- CAMUSAC: museum of contemporary art.

== Economy ==
Cassino's economy is based on industry and tertiary. The Fiat Chrysler Plant and its satellite firms employs a significant part of the population. As a consequence, the economy is strongly influenced by the automotive sector's trends, as experienced from the recent crisis. Cassino also has an SKF plant and several paper mills and marble factories.

The Saturday weekly market is also an attraction of people from the surrounding municipalities. Cassino also has a courthouse.

== Education ==
Cassino hosts the University of Cassino with the Faculties of Economics, Law, Languages, Physical Education and Literature located in the campus and the Faculty of Engineering located in the city centre. Cassino also hosts branches of the Sapienza University of Rome and the University of Rome Tor Vergata for the degrees in Physiotherapy and Nursing. The University of Cassino and Southern Lazio, with a score of 66.8 points, is ranked at 1711 among the world's best universities by cwur.org.

== Transport ==
Being in a crossroads of the regions of Lazio, Campania, Abruzzo and Molise, Cassino has been a strategic hub for transports and communications.

=== Roads ===
- Autostrada A1: motorway (highway) that links Milan and Naples.
- SR509: highway that links Cassino and Sora.
- SS6
- SS749

=== Rail ===
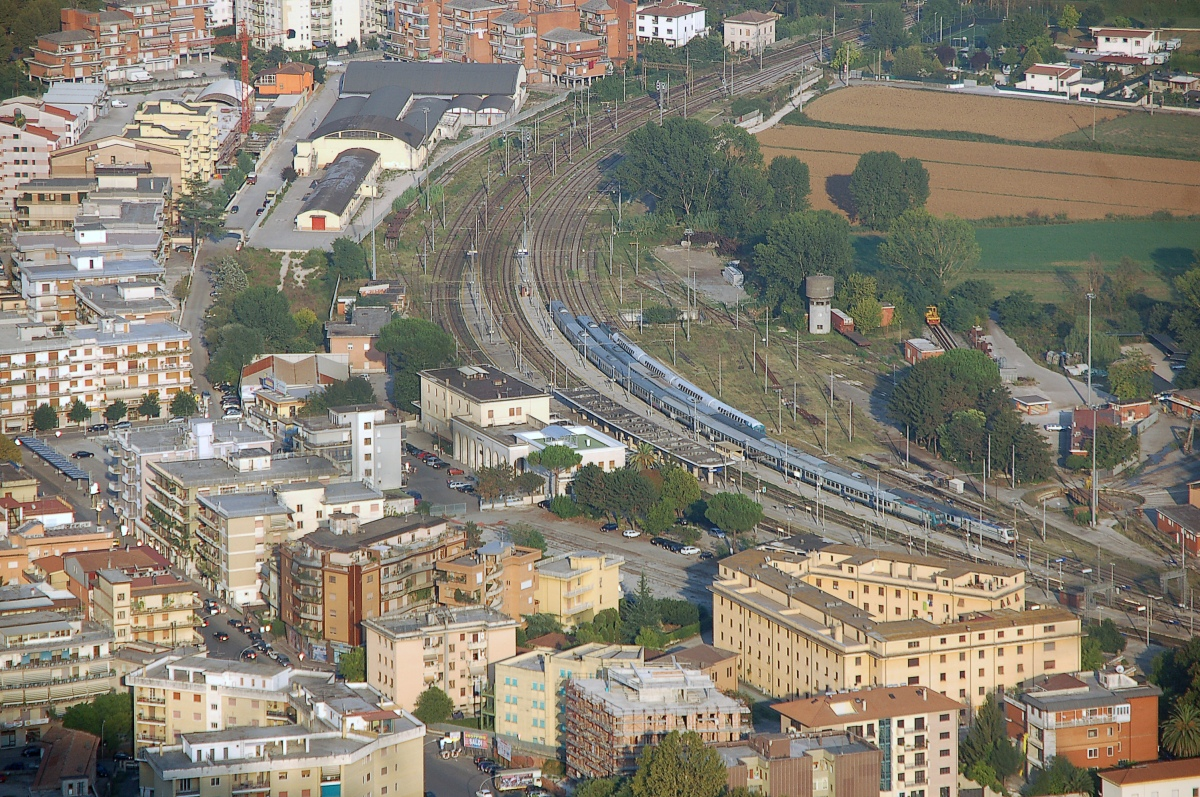
View of Cassino station.

The town of Cassino is along the Rome–Cassino–Naples railway line. It is also linked with Abruzzo and Apulia. Cassino is served by one station.

- Cassino station: opened in 1863, is the main railway station. It is located in the city centre.

=== Bus ===
The companies Magni and Mastrantoni provides services into the city centre. Cotral links the town with other municipalities in Lazio, CLP with Campania and ATM with Molise.

== Sports ==
Cassino's main football club is A.S.D. Cassino Calcio 1924, which currently plays in Serie D, in the fourth division. During its best seasons, it played in Serie C2 and Lega Pro Seconda Divisione. It plays in Gino Salveti Stadium.

The main basketball club is Virtus Terra di San Benedetto Cassino, which plays in Divisione Nazionale B. Basket Cassino used to reach Serie B. It has been also guided by the coach Sergei Belov.

== Twin cities ==
Cassino is twinned with:

- Steglitz-Zehlendorf (borough of Berlin), Germany, since 1969
- Zamość, Poland, since 1969
- Falaise, France, since 1974
- Tychy, Poland, since 1977
- Užice, Serbia since 1981
- North York, Canada, since 1987
- Karlovy Vary, Czech Republic, since 1991
- Ortona, Italy, since 1991
- Casino, Australia, since 1997
- Cavarzere, Italy, since 1998
- Senglea, Malta, since 2003
- Leno, Italy, since 2005
- Olinda, Brazil, since 2006
- Norcia, Italy, since 2017
- Subiaco, Italy, since 2017
- Minturno, Italy, since 2026

== People ==
- Alain Delon, French actor whose grandmother was from Cassino.
- Arturo Gatti, Canadian professional boxer who was born in Cassino.
- Dario Franchitti, Scottish motor racing driver who was originally from Cassino.
- Marcus Terentius Varro, ancient Roman scholar and writer who had a villa in Cassino.
- Benedict of Nursia, Christian saint, patron of Cassino and Europe and founder of the Abbey of Montecassino.
- Scholastica, Christian saint who founded the female Benedictine Order in Cassino.
- Bertharius, Christian martyr and saint who was the abbot of Montecassino.
- Richard of San Germano, notary and historian who was born in Cassino.
- Pope Gregory IX, pope who signed the peace with Frederick II, Holy Roman Emperor, in Cassino.
- Leopold VI, Duke of Austria, who died in Cassino.
- Piero de' Medici, politician and governor of Cassino.
- Philip Neri, priest who had his religious conversion in Cassino.
- Giuseppe Moscati, doctor, scientific researcher and university professor who lived in Cassino.
- Antonio Labriola, philosopher who was born in Cassino.
- Michael Valente, World War I Medal of Honor recipient.
- Severino Gazzelloni, flute player who died in Cassino.
- Dante Troisi, judge in Cassino.
- Vittorio Miele, painter.
- Francesco Storace, politician who was born in Cassino.
- Gino Matrundola, former Canadian politician.
- Sergei Belov, former professional basketball player who was coach of Basket Cassino from 1991 to 1993.
- Pietro Mennea, holder of the world record for the distance 150 metres (490 ft) in Cassino.
- Domenico Di Carlo, former professional football player and manager who was born in Cassino.
- Dino Lenny, DJ, singer, record producer and record label owner who lived in Cassino.
- Trevor Trevisan, professional football player who was born in Cassino.
- Angelo Ogbonna, professional football player who was born in Cassino.
- Tära, singer-songwriter who was born in Cassino.

== See also ==
- Abbey of Monte Cassino
- Battle of Cassino
- Cassino Memorial
