= Cassino War Cemetery =

WWII CWGC cemetery in Cassino, Italy

- Veterans Affairs Canada; Commonwealth War Graves Commission
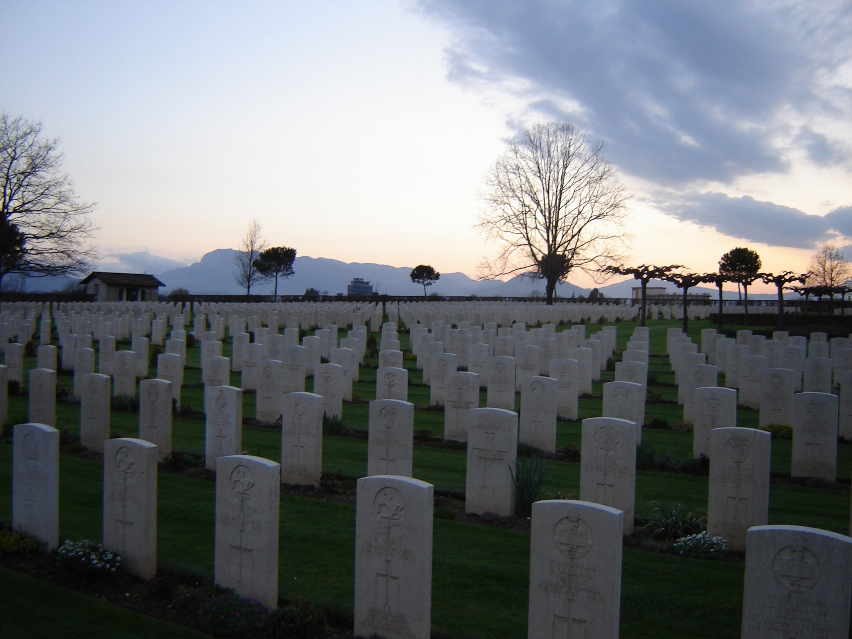
- For Commonwealth service members of World War II from the Italian Campaign
- Unveiled: 1944
- Location: 41.4776°N 13.8271°E; Cassino, south-east of Rome, Italy
- Commemorated: 4,271

The Cassino War Cemetery is a war grave cemetery in the comune of Cassino, Province of Frosinone, 139 kilometres (86 mi) south-east of Rome, Italy.

Of the burials, 289 servicemen are unidentified. Within the cemetery stands the Cassino Memorial which commemorates over 4,000 Commonwealth servicemen who took part in the Italian campaign and whose graves are not known.

== Cassino Memorial ==
Whenever possible, these war memorials were placed within military cemeteries near the theatres of operations. During the Battle of Monte Cassino, Cassino saw some of the fiercest fighting of the Italian Campaign, the town itself and the dominating Monastery Hill proving the most stubborn obstacles encountered in the advance towards Rome. The majority of those buried in the war cemetery died in the battles during these months. As of 2012 there are 4,271 Commonwealth servicemen of the Second World War buried or commemorated at Cassino War Cemetery. From Canada, 194 servicemembers are honoured on the Cassino Memorial.

One soldier memorialised on the cenotaph is Yeshwant Ghadge (1921–1944), who served in the 5th Mahratta Light Infantry in the British Indian Army. For gallantry against the enemy, Ghadge was awarded the Victoria Cross. Another is Dan Billany, who served in the East Yorkshire Regiment and was also a novelist, who disappeared after escaping from enemy captivity in 1943. This cemetery also houses the body of Eric Fletcher Waters (1914–1944), father of former Pink Floyd member Roger Waters.

== See also ==
- Polish cemetery at Monte Cassino
