= Dan Billany =

English novelist

- Born: Daniel Billany; 14 November 1913; England
- Disappeared: 20 November 1943 (aged 30); Capistrello, Italy
- Status: Missing for 82 years, 7 months and 17 days; Presumed dead in 1944

Dan Billany (14 November 1913 – disappeared 20 November 1943) was an English novelist.

== Biography ==
Billany was born and raised in Hull. He joined the Labour League of Youth and later the Hull Branch of the Socialist Party of Great Britain, but was expelled from the latter in 1933 for his involvement in an internal dispute. He later joined the National Unemployed Workers' Movement.

Billany received a degree in English from the University College of Hull in 1937. His career in teaching was interrupted by the outbreak of World War II; Billany joined the army in 1940 and became an officer as lieutenant in the 4th battalion of the East Yorkshire Regiment. He was captured by the Germans and spent June 1942 till September 1943 as a prisoner of war in Italy.

Throughout the war off duty, Billany concentrated on his writing. The Opera House Murders, a thriller, and The Magic Door, a book for boys, were published in 1940 and 1943, respectively. After the capitulation of Italy in September 1943, Billany fled to the countryside with his manuscripts, working on them for weeks while hiding from the German army. He deposited them with a friendly local who promised to post them to Britain at the conclusion of the war. These manuscripts, The Cage and The Trap, were received by Billany's family in 1946 and eventually published to wide acclaim. In Dockers and Detectives, Ken Worpole lauded The Trap as "the finest novel to come out of the war".

== Disappearance ==
In October 1943, Billany and three friends began to make their way over the Apennines towards the Allied forces. They were last seen in Capistrello on 20 November 1943, and presumably died in the mountains a few days later. Lieutenant Dan Billany is listed on the Commonwealth War Grave Commission's Cassino Memorial, to Commonwealth military personnel who have no known grave, as having died on 1 January 1944.

== Bibliography ==
=== Novels ===
- The Opera House Murders (1940; published in 1941 in the United States under the title It Takes a Thief)
- The Magic Door (1943)
- The Cage (novel) (with David Dowie) (1949)
- The Trap (1950)
- The Whispering (1942) published 2008 ISBN 978-0-9557117-1-8

== See also ==
- List of people who disappeared
