= Dante Troisi =

Italian writer and magistrate (1920–1989)

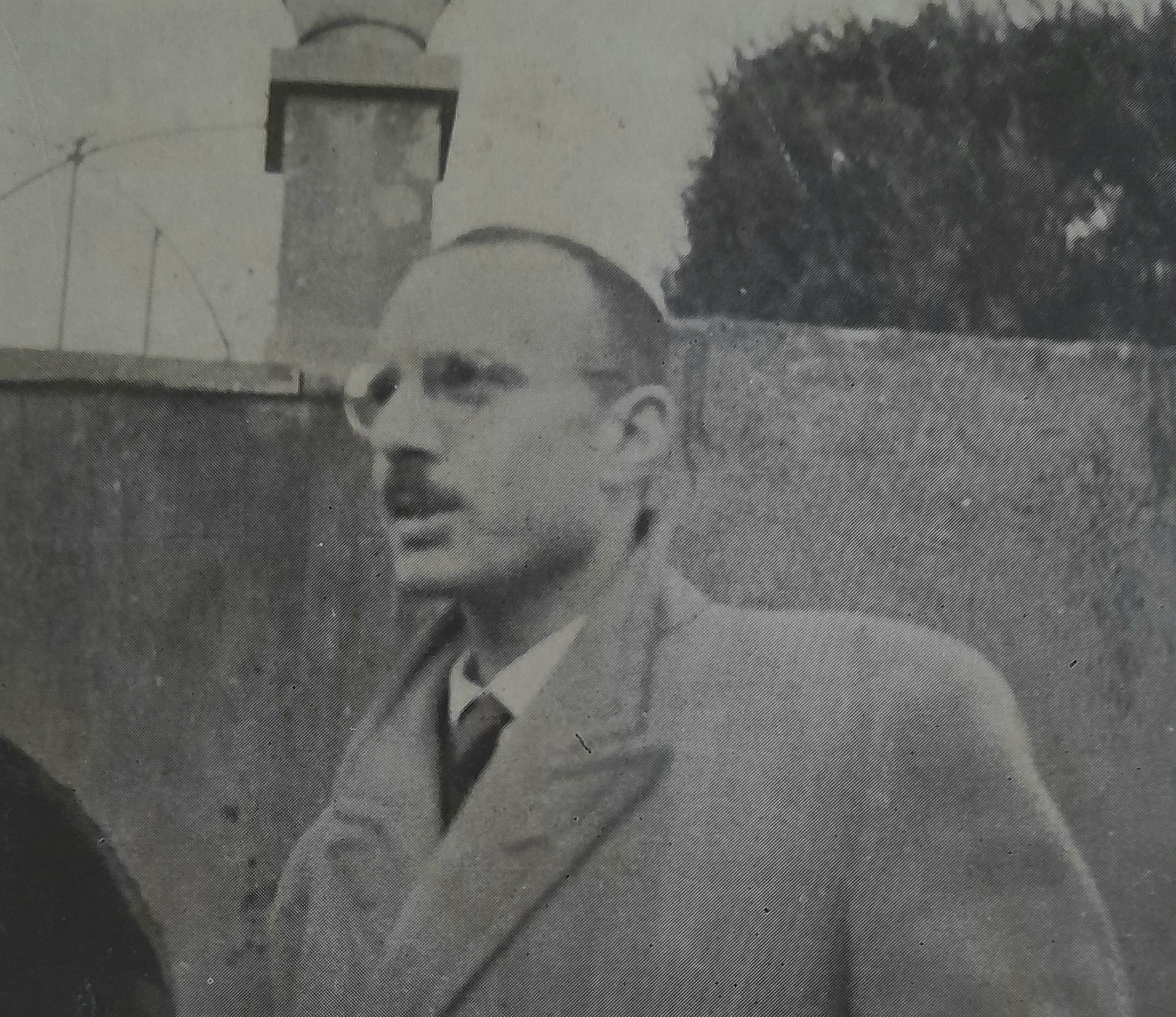
- Born: 21 April 1920; Tufo
- Died: 2 January 1989 (aged 68); Rome
- Occupations: Writer, magistrate

Dante Troisi (21 April 1920 – 2 January 1989) was an Italian writer and magistrate. His writings primarily deal with the cultural and sociological woes of Italy following World War II. Much of his literature draws on issues raised through his work as a magistrate. His most significant work is likely the novel Diario di un giudice (Diary of a Judge), written in 1962. In 2005, Troisi was posthumously awarded the Feronia Literary Prize, an award given to distinguished poets and authors.

== Biography ==
Dante Troisi was born in Tufo, a small town in the Province of Avellino, on 21 April 1920. He attended a secondary school in Avellino, and obtained a law degree from the University of Bari. Troisi was drafted into the Italian military during World War II, and fought during the campaigns in Libya and Tunisia. In May 1943, Troisi was captured by Allied forces. He was sent to a prison camp in Hereford, Texas and remained there until the end of the war. After the war, Troisi returned to Italy in 1947 and became a judge in Pavia. Later on, he was elevated to the position of magistrate, first in Cassino and then in Rome. Troisi died on 2 January 1989, before the publication of his final work, La sera del concerto (The Night of the Concert), after struggling with a serious illness for two years.

== Writings ==
Troisi's first work as a writer was the book L'ulivo nella sabbia (The Olive Tree in the Sand) and was written in 1951. The story revolves around the relationship between a judge and a man charged with hiding a cachet of weapons. The two were formerly friends while serving together in northern Africa during World War II. The plot is primarily a psychological one—contrasting the two men and how they dealt with the war. Innocente delitto (Innocent Crime) was written in 1960 and dealt with the problems between the generations of post-war Italy. Diario di un giudice (Diary of a Judge), drawing heavily from his experience as a judge, was written in 1962 and deals with the difficulty of the job. Troisi felt that there was a deep mistrust of the Italian judicial system. Troisi's writings, while very pessimistic at times, were filled with challenges to morality and philosophy. His style was marked by a concentration on dialogue, and left little room for scenery description or plot development. Although Troisi's style has been compared to that of the existentialist Albert Camus, it is more accurate to say that he was a moralist, showing his concerns for the social and ideological issues of his time.
