= Polish Cemetery at Casamassima =

Military cemetery in Italy

Coordinates: 40°59′8″N 16°54′58″E

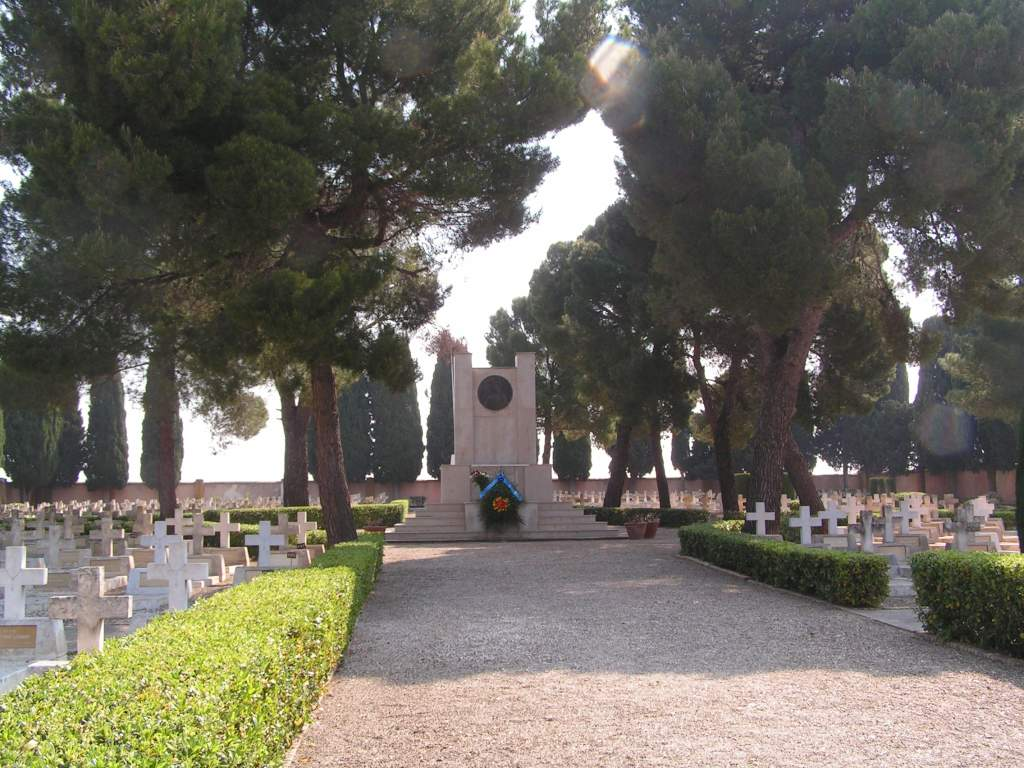
Polish Cemetery altar at Casamassima

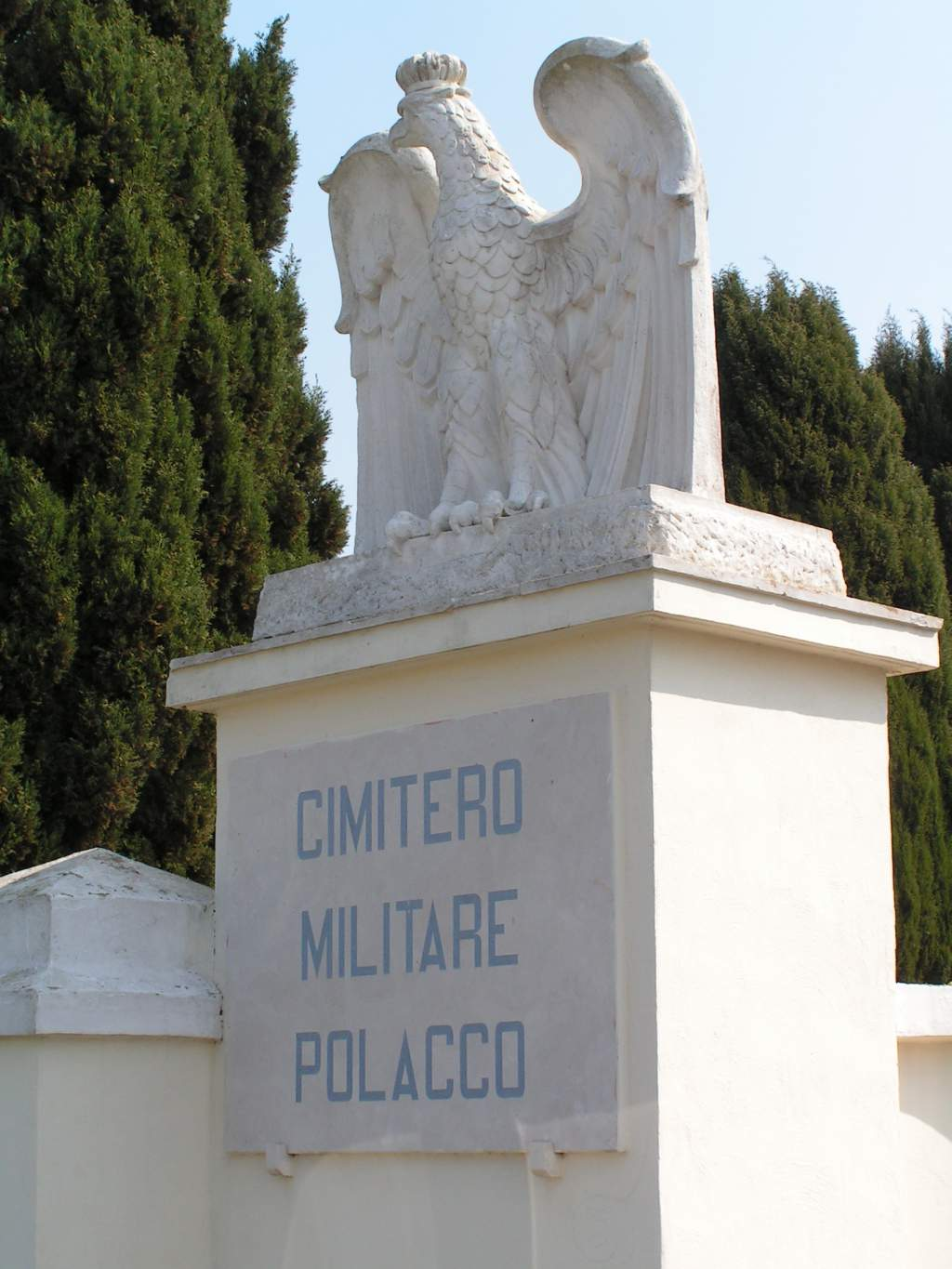
Monument to the Polish soldiers

The Polish War Cemetery at Casamassima was established in Casamassima, near Bari, in southern Italy, where there are about 431 graves of Polish soldiers and officers of the 2nd Polish Corps who died between 1944 and 1945. This small cemetery, mostly "Italian" in style, with decorative trees, is typical of the Mediterranean region and is located among surrounding vineyards.

Set in the middle of the cemetery, is an altar with the inscription: Heroes, not broken by the force of law — bravely and nobly died. Combatants who are buried there either died on the Gustav Line on the Sangro River, or had been wounded there or at Battle of Monte Cassino, and or had died either in hospitals in Bari or Naples.

The commander of the Westerplatte Garrison at the Battle of Westerplatte, Major Henryk Sucharski was buried there when he died in 1946. At the entrance gate, visitors are reminded of the words of Paul, the Apostle of Nations: I have fought a good fight, I have finished my course, I have kept the faith...

During one of Cardinal Stefan Wyszynski's visits to Italy, on 4 June 1957, he visited the cemetery at Casamassima. He spoke the following words during this visit, expressing his great respect for their dedication to their homeland:

I wish the families of these beloved children, who fought for the freedom of all nations could come here as soon as possible and share this wonderful feeling which I experienced today, seeing these neat graves, that are cared for with great sensitivity by the Italian brothers. This is a piece of Poland, where they buried 431 best sons in anticipation of the eternal life, remembered in the prayers of those who for a long time, in the name of the pain and sacrifice that has no limits, replaced grieving mothers who could not weep over the graves.

The cemetery is maintained by the municipality of Casamassima and the Polish Honorary Consul General in Bari, Italy.

In addition to soldiers from the 2nd Polish Corps, the Cemetery contains the remains of 15 members of the Polish Air Force, members of the 1586 Special Operations Flight, operating supply drops to Poland from the RAF base at Brindisi. They were the crews aboard Liberators BZ589 and BZ949.

== See also ==
- Polish Cemetery at Monte Cassino
- Polish Cemetery in Bandar-e Anzali
