= Trevor Trevisan =

Italian football player and official

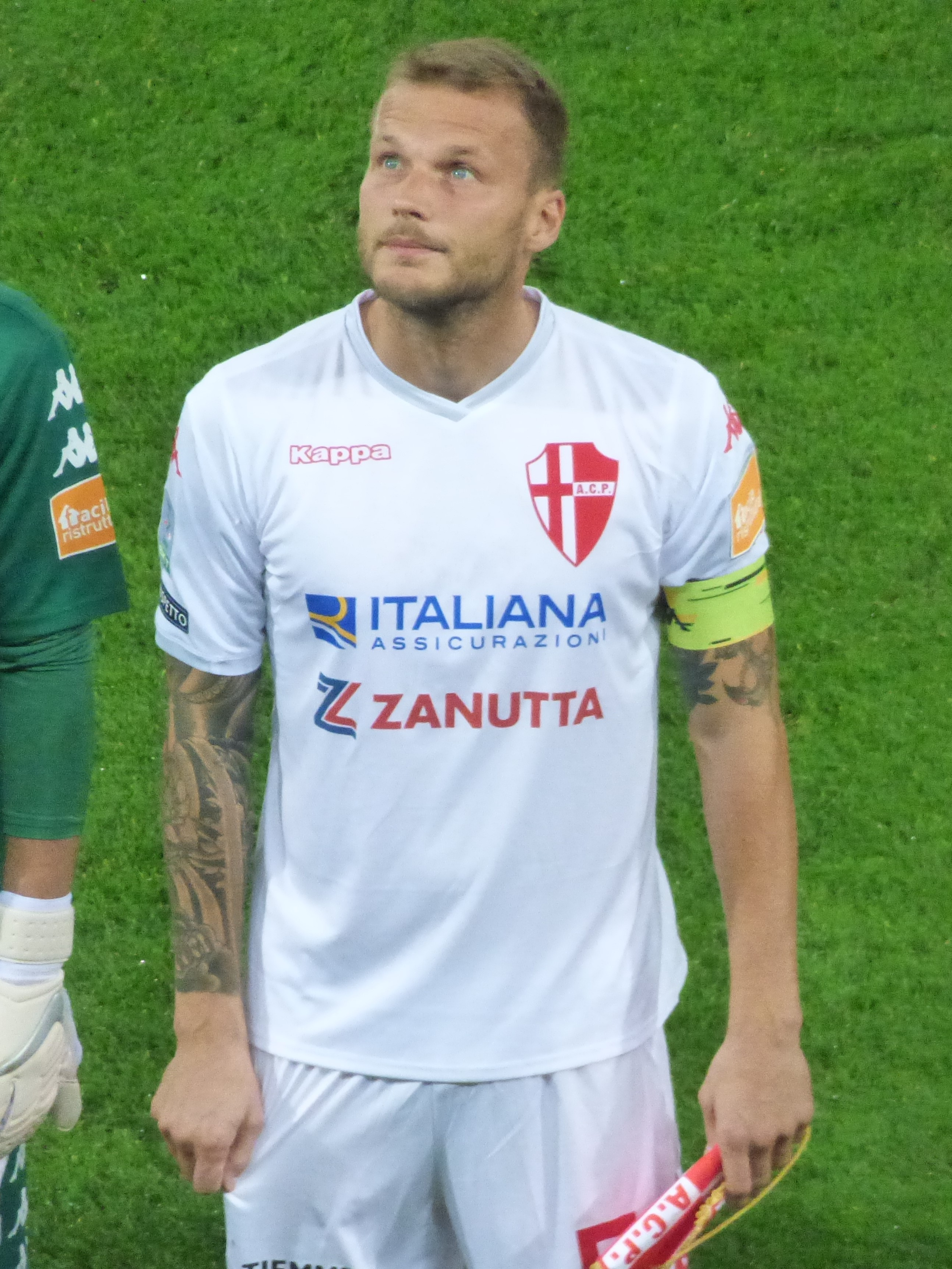
- Trevisan in 2018

Personal information
- Date of birth: 21 December 1983 (age 42)
- Place of birth: Cassino, Italy
- Height: 1.86 m (6 ft 1 in)
- Position: Defender

Team information
- Current team: Casertana (sporting director)

Youth career
- 2000–2001: Sacilese
- 2001–2002: Pordenone

Senior career*
| Years | Team | Apps | (Gls) |
| 2002–2003 | L'Aquila | 11 | (1) |
| 2003–2005 | Giulianova | 31 | (0) |
| 2005–2006 | Vicenza | 22 | (0) |
| 2007–2009 | Pisa | 65 | (2) |
| 2009–2014 | Padova | 123 | (7) |
| 2014 | → Varese (loan) | 13 | (1) |
| 2014–2016 | Salernitana | 35 | (3) |
| 2016–2017 | Reggiana | 24 | (0) |
| 2017–2019 | Padova | 54 | (2) |
- * Club domestic league appearances and goals

Trevor Trevisan (born 21 December 1983) is an Italian football official and former player who played as a defender. He is the sporting director of Serie C Group C club Casertana.

== Playing career ==
Trevisan started his senior career at Sacilese and Pordenone at Serie D. After a season, he was signed by L'Aquila at Serie C1. After the team was almost relegated to Serie C2, he was signed by league rival Giulianova. He started to play regularly at 2004–05 season for Giulianova.

In July 2005, he was signed by Vicenza of Serie B. After nil appearances at 2007–08 season, he joined Pisa in a co-ownership deal on 15 January 2007. He won Serie B promotion with the team and was the regular of the team, and was signed by Pisa permanently.

In January 2009, Trevisan was dropped to the bench after Pisa signed new defenders like Leonardo Bonucci. He played four out of five matches in May towards the end of the season.

After Pisa's bankruptcy, he joined Padova, newly promoted to Serie B. He signed a 2+1 year contract.

On 31 January 2014, Trevisan joined Serie B side Varese on a loan deal.

== Post-playing career ==
At the end of the 2018–19 season, he retired as a player and was appointed to club manager position with Padova.

On 19 June 2024, Trevisan was unveiled as the new sporting director of Serie C club Casertana.
