= Polish Cemetery in Bandar-e Anzali =

Cemetery in Bandar-e Anzali, Iran

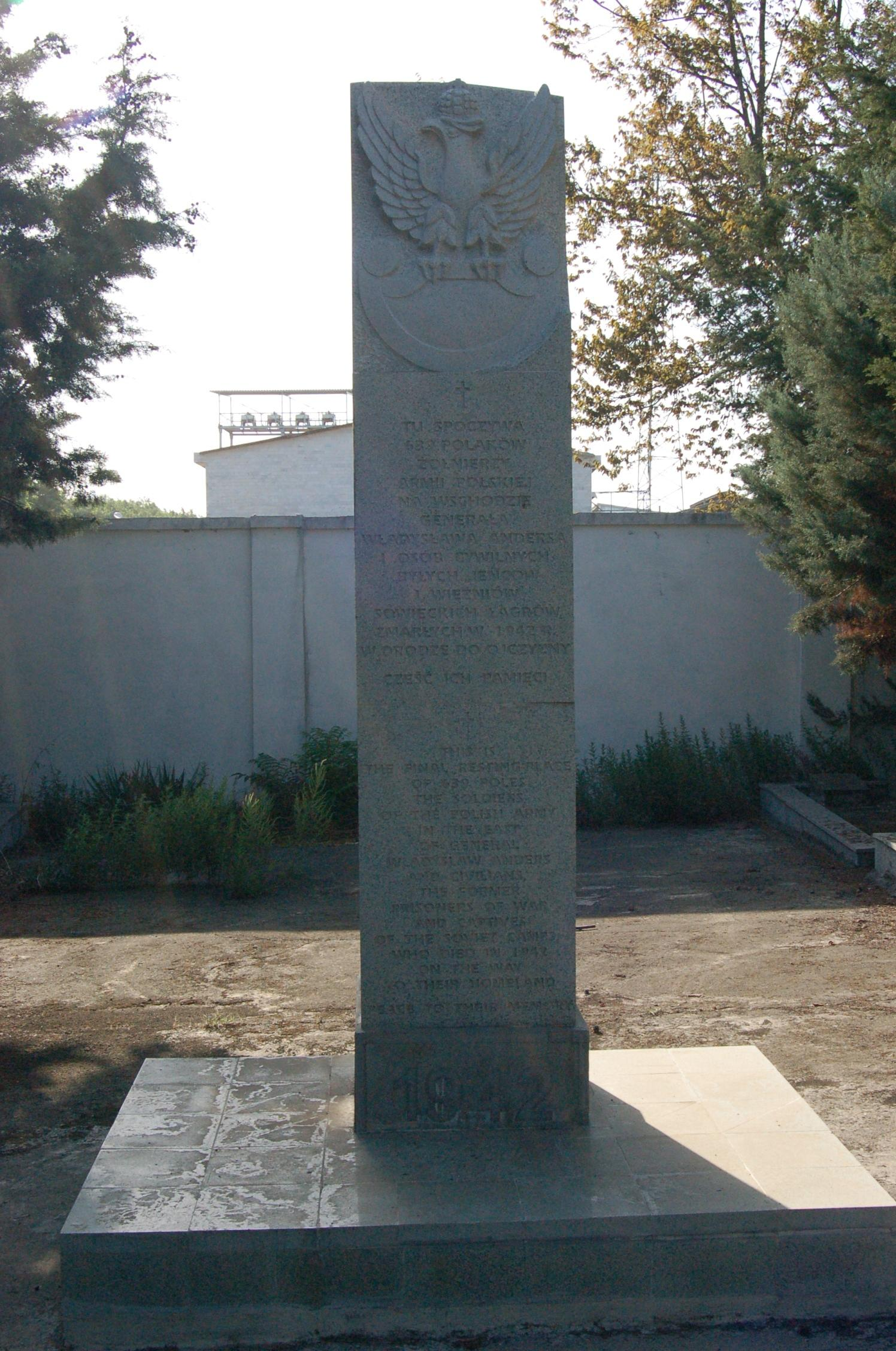
Cemetery monument

Polish Cemetery in Bandar-e Anzali is a cemetery in Bandar-e Anzali, a city in northern Iran. It was made during Evacuation of Polish civilians from the USSR in World War II. This war cemetery contains the remains of 163 graves of the Polish soldiers of the Anders' Army and 476 graves of the Polish civilians who perished due to sickness during their transport to the Middle East, for a total of 639 graves. Bandar-e Anzali is the port where the Polish Anders' Army disembarked, in an operation that lasted from April 1, 1942 until October 1942, after evacuating from the USSR.

== Overview ==
At the center of the cemetery stands a high rectangular column of white marble which is engraved with a Polish eagle. Below it, in English and Polish, are inscribed the words:

This is the resting place of 639 Poles, the soldiers of the Polish Army of the East, of General Władysław Anders and civilians, the prisoners of war, and captives of the Soviet camps who died in 1942 on the way to their homeland. Peace to their memory.

The cemetery also has a street gate, with the large inscription CMENTARZ POLSKI, but it is closed with a padlock. On the gate, a worn Persian–language plaque announces that burials took place here between 1939 and 1945. It can be accessed only from the Armenian graveyard, and a low wall separates the two cemeteries. Rows of graves are lined up on both sides of the monument, each with 18 concrete headstones showing the names of the deceased, their dates of birth and death, and also the ranks of the soldiers. If they were unknown, they were marked as "Nieznany" (Polish: "unknown,") of whom only the date of death was known.

== Gallery ==
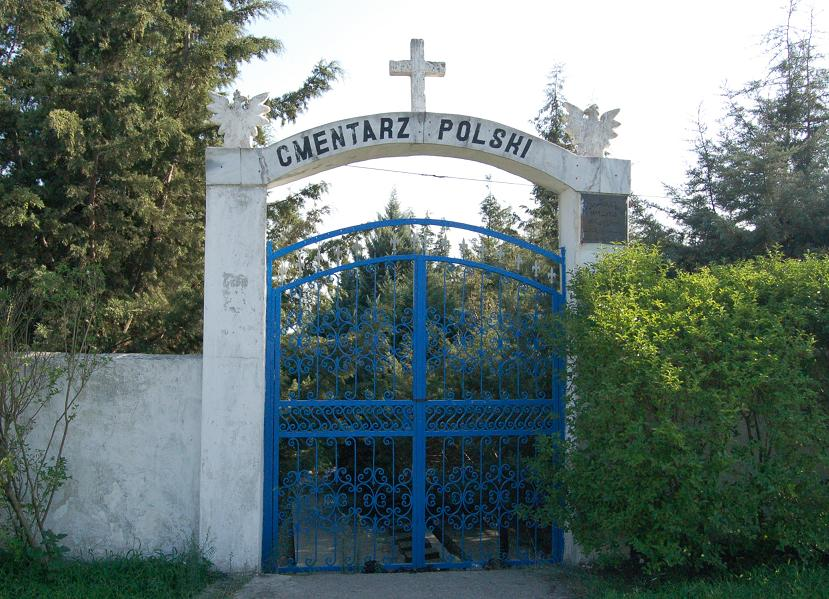
Main gate of the cemetery

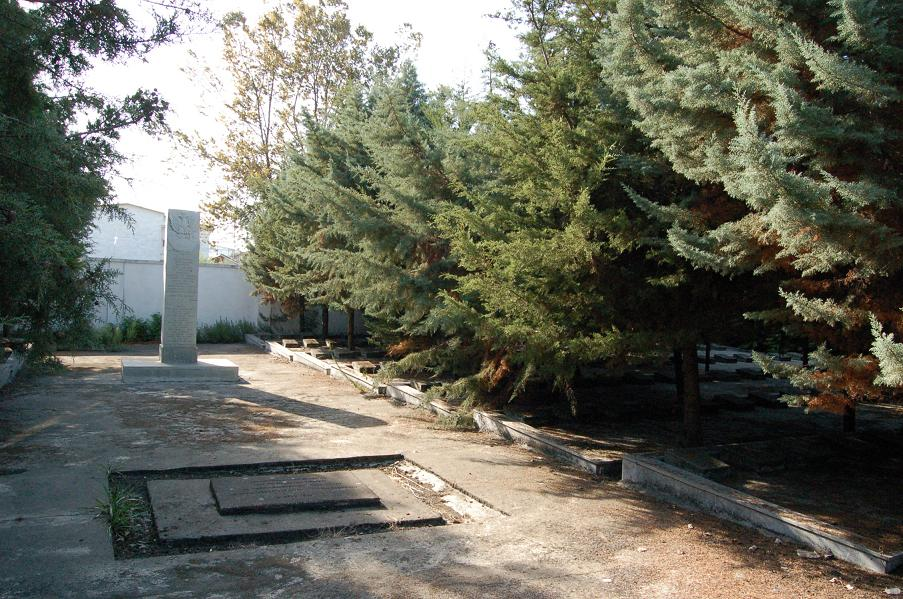
Monument & Memorial Plaque

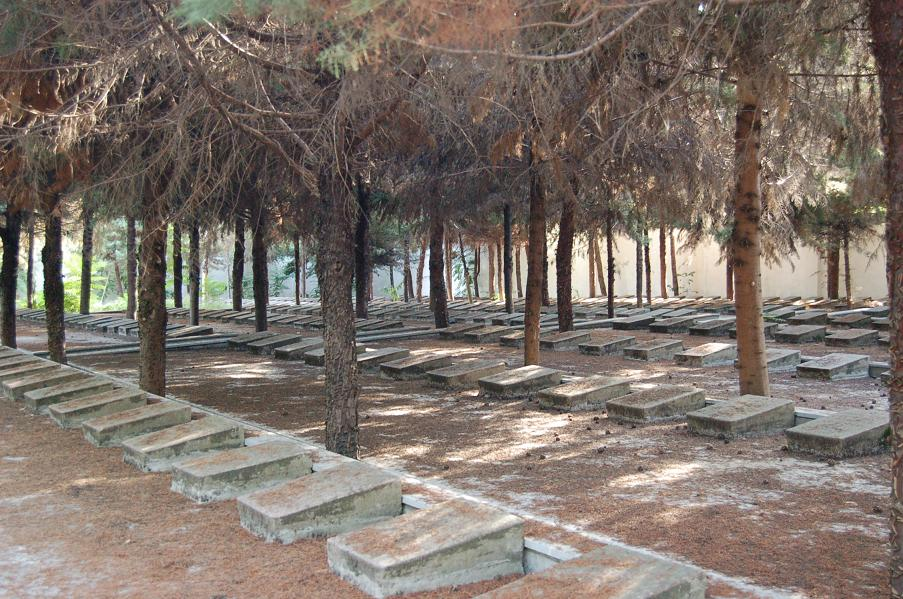
Main part of the Polish Cemetery

== See also ==
- Polish Cemetery at Monte Cassino
- Polish Military Cemetery at Casamassima
