= Casamassima =

- Comune
- Comune di Casamassima
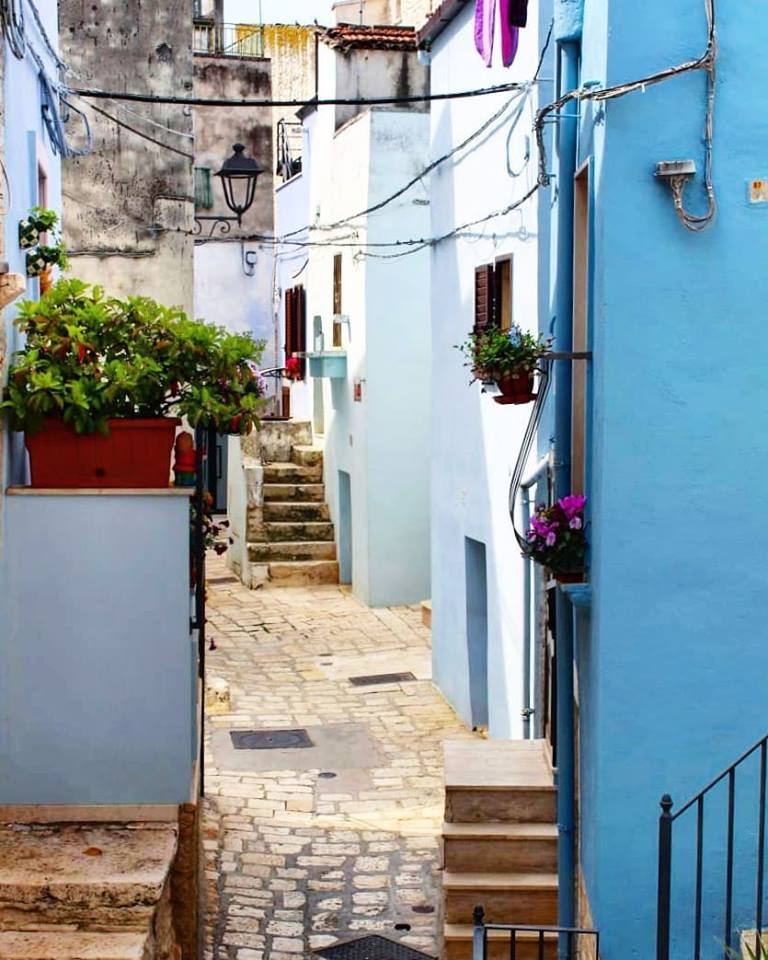
- View of Casamassima

- Coat of arms

- Location within Italy Location within Apulia
- Coordinates: 40°57′N 16°55′E
- Country: Italy
- Region: Apulia
- Metropolitan city: Bari (BA)

Government
  - Mayor: Giuseppe Nitti

Area
  - Total: 77 km^{2} (30 sq mi)
- Elevation: 223 m (732 ft)

Population (31 December 2016)
  - Total: 19,846
  - Density: 260/km^{2} (670/sq mi)
- Demonym: Casamassimesi
- Time zone: UTC+1 (CET)
  - Summer (DST): UTC+2 (CEST)
- Postal code: 70010
- Dialing code: 080
- Patron saint: San Rocco
- Saint day: Second Sunday in September
- Website: Official website

Casamassima (Barese: Casamàsseme) is a town and comune of 19,786 inhabitants in the Metropolitan City of Bari, in Apulia, southern Italy. Is also called "The Blue Town". The town is located inland from the Italian coastline, thrives and is built on agriculture, primarily that of wine, olives and almond production. Founded around the seventh and eighth centuries, the village started as a Roman encampment, according to legend.

== Physical geography ==
Casamassima is located at the foot of the Murge with an average altitude of 230 meters. The highest point of the town is located at the area, in Casamassimese dialect "Vì d Caldaral" while the lower one is the area near Via Conversano and near to the commercial area. The territory is characterized by very fertile land and the presence of Lama San Giorgio that flows near the Bosco di Marcedd. Casamassima borders the municipalities of Turi, Adelfia, Sammichele di Bari, Acquaviva delle Fonti, Noicattaro, Valenzano, Capurso, Cellamare and Rutigliano

== History ==
=== From the foundation to the Middle Ages ===
The village was perhaps founded by Quintus Fabius Maximus Verrucosus during the Punic Wars who was a general belonging to the Roman family Massimi. Its primitive nucleus was therefore Roman and the name derives from this origin: an accampamento dei Massimi. It could also mean casa più grande.

In the old city there are walls dating well back into the early tenth century, although the oldest official document concerning Casamassima that has survived is a short time after the Placiti Cassinesi, which are dated between 960 and 963. It concerns a morgengabio, that according to the ancient Lombard custom, specified the part of the goods that the husband gave to his bride the day after the first wedding night. Before that, however, it was probably under the control of lords from other feudal systems nearby, such as Acquaviva delle Fonti or Conversano.

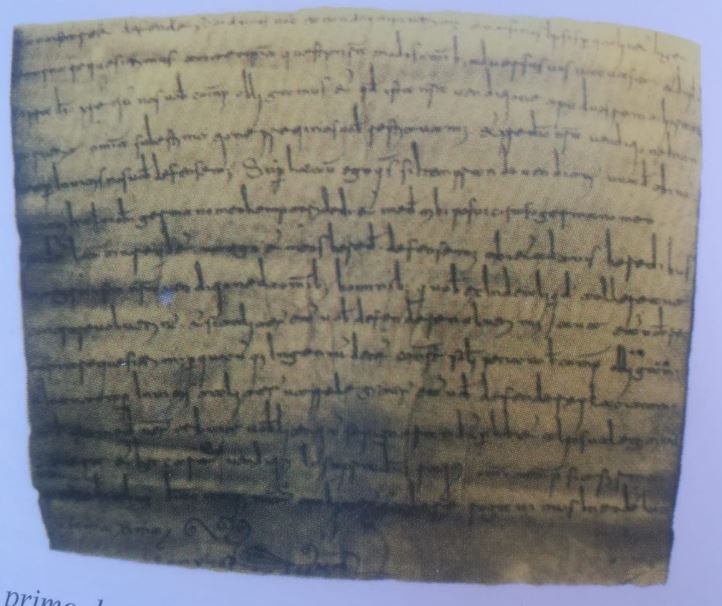
Morgengabio di Casamassima.

In 962, in Casamassima, Sikeprando and Eregarda, spouses, sell to Kalolohanne a piece of vineyard for the price of five Costantini money, the woman cum consensu and voluntate his brother Garzanito and his relative Kolahure sells the fourth part of his morgincap.

The document, kept in the archive of Bari Cathedral, in Bari, is one of the few existing traces that shows the presence of Casamassima as a well-organized community at the end of tenth century.

Casamassima lived for centuries under many Apulian lordships, constantly dependent on the feuds of neighboring countries as Conversano and Acquaviva delle Fonti, and then increased its importance. Evidence of this period is the castle in the historic center of Casamassima.

The ancient village is medieval, developed from the eighth century around a Norman tower that has then expanded, becoming a castle.

==== Attack by Louis I of Hungary ====
In 1347 Louis I of Hungary, kingdom of Hungary, following the killing of his brother Andrew, Duke of Calabria (occurred on 18 September 1345 to Aversa) consort of Joanna I of Naples, descended to Naples with a strong army. Joanna I, despite the support of Pope Clement VI, fled from Naples to Provence. In the province of Bari the greatest supporter of Queen Giovanna was Pipino, Count Palatine of Altamura, but he was unsuccessful against the Hungarian army that conquered all the territories where he arrived. Bari, Palo del Colle and Corato Bari, Palo del Colle and Corato opposed a strong resistance to Louis I while Rutigliano and Casamassima began to organize themselves against them.

Rutigliano, however, after an initial resistance surrendered, and Casamassima was then attacked. This, trusting in the fortified structure of the bell tower, prepared for the attack of the assailants. The women were protected, along with the children, who were brought to the main church along with the furnishings and precious objects, and the men prepared for the battle. Louis I commandeered all livestock that had not been brought within the walls and began the assault. The trained troops defeated the defenders, killing, stealing and burning everything. After an initial resistance even the church building was captured («It was the devil who, being the master of all evil deeds, suggested to certain Lombards to send detachments into the woods of the surroundings to gather wood, bundles and stubble and bring them into the village stacking them under the church.»). Other cities, such as Bari, Palo del Colle, and Corato did not succumb because of their usage of fortifying walls and moats. Afterwards it was rebuilt, only to then be controlled by the Principality of Taranto under the Kingdom of Naples, which eventually fell to the House of Durazzo in 1394.

=== 16th to 19th century ===
In 1609 the feud which belonged to the Acquaviva family, was bought by the Portugal family of Jewish origin Vaaz.

In 1658 to Bari there was an epidemic of plague, probably carried by the sailors of a ship arrived in the port, and in a short time over 20 thousand inhabitants of the capital were infected and died. The Duke Odoardo Vaaz, at Casamassima, he ordered with the painting of the buildings, monuments and churches adding the blue color to the quicklime, probably sulphate copper. The plague was thus removed from the country and later a small church was built, dedicated to Our Lady of Constantinople, as a sign of gratitude and to honor a vow of the duke.

In 1667 it was then sold to the Neapolitan family of D'Aponte.

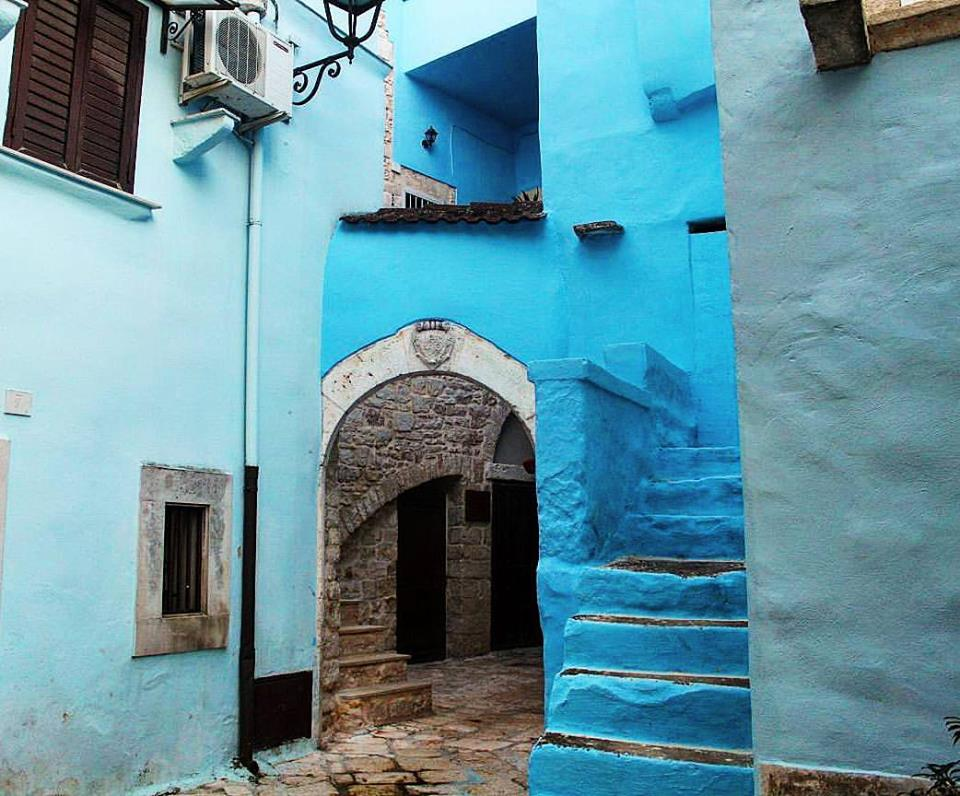
Chiasso Bongustai, il Paese Azzurro

=== The blue country (paese azzurro) ===
Following the historical truth concerning the plague epidemic, legends overlapped, and one of these tells how the ancient village became all blue only after overcoming the danger of contagion and to honor the vow made by the lord of Casamassima Michele Vaaz to the Madonna, that had preserved the village from the deadly epidemic. For gratitude Duke Vaaz would ordered to paint the block with quicklime adding the blue color of the mantle of the Madonna, now depicted under the arch of Via Santa Chiara.

=== Since the 20th country ===
In the 60s the Milanese painter Vittorio Viviani seeing Casamassima was struck by its unique characteristic and began to paint using the village as a setting for his paintings and called Casamassima "Il Paese Azzurro". The stratifications of blue lime on the ancient buildings bear witness to the unique past of the village, which unlike the typical white Apulian towns shows the shades of blue.

Up to the 1980s, the town had mainly agricultural vocation then a period of new urbanization followed and the recovery of the historic centre began.

== Monuments and places of interest ==
=== Religious architecture ===
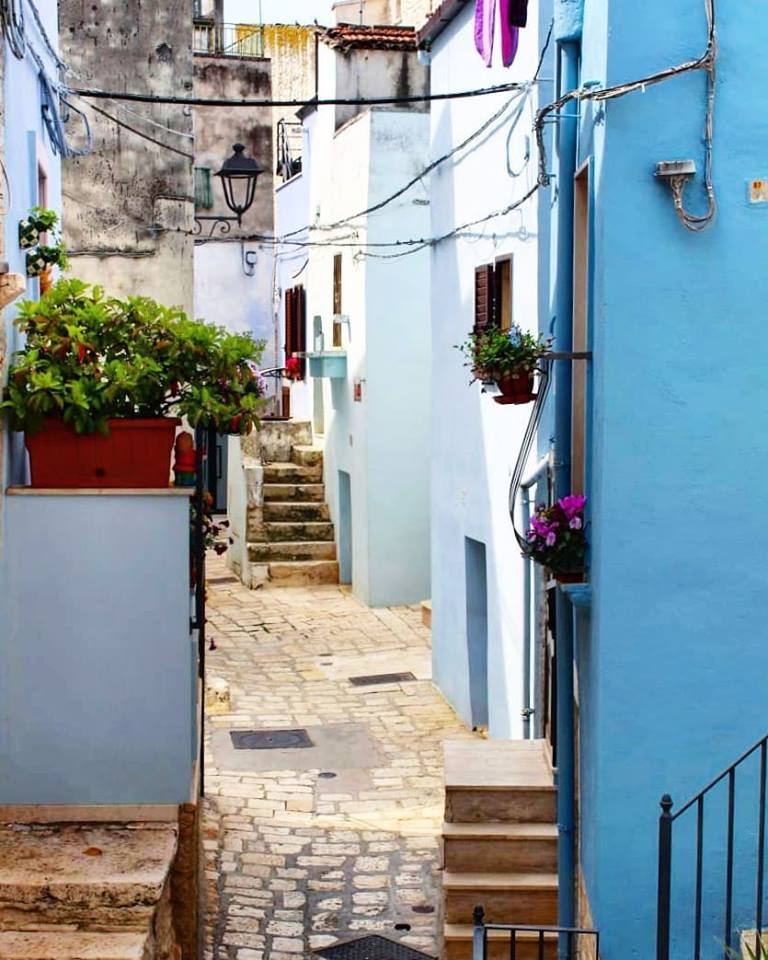
Via Paliodoro

Monastery of Santa Chiara.

The monastery is the most imposing building in the historic center and was founded in 1573 by Antonio Acquaviva of Aragon with money from his sister Donna Dorotea. Built as an orphanage, a century later (1600) it becomes the Monastery of the Poor Clares. Over the years it has undergone various changes and transformations: after the Unification of Italy it was suppressed and used, over time, as a prison, school, cine-theater and home. The façade on Via Scesciola has a rusticated ground floor, a long crowning viewpoint with iron gratings. Inside the cloister you can see two sides with arches on pillars and in the center an elevated cistern.

Saint Croce of Matrice church

Built on another of the century. XII – XIII, It has a wall structure with smooth and regular ashlars. Leaning against the church we find the bell tower in regular stone ashlars, two floors divided by ornate frames. The first floor has mullioned windows with arches turned on the capitals, included in an upper arch laid on shelves. On the second floor there is a loggia with a perforated checkerboard parapet. It consists internally of three large naves with chapels, in which, among the many works of great interest, there are a baptismal font of 1200 and the statue of San Rocco, protector of the city.

Complex of the Monacelle.

The result of an adaptation of a former palace belonging to an important local family: the De Bellis family. The last owner, Don Domenico Console, bought the palace and made it an orphanage where civil and religious education was given to young girls. Inside the orphanage was established a women's music conservatory, one of the most important in the province was established and it was appreciated by the Kingdom of Naples. After the unification of Italy it was used as a barracks of a police force, hotel and elementary school, compromising the original fabric of the building. Today It is used as the seat of some municipal offices and a rich library with study rooms, computer rooms, a well-equipped auditorium and an art gallery belonging to the Don Sante Montanaro Foundation, in addition to the presence of the eco-museum of SAC Pecutezia.

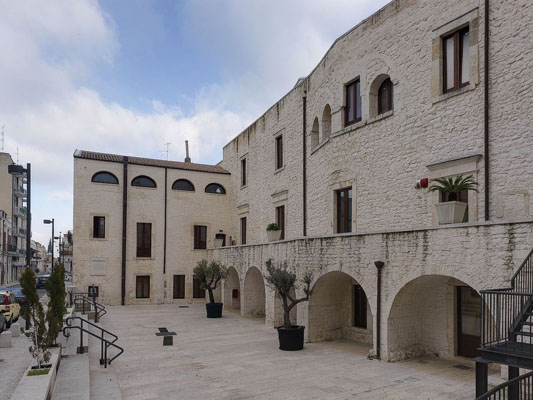
Palazzo Monacelle, seat of the municipal library and former Palazzo De Bellis. Entrance from Via Roma.

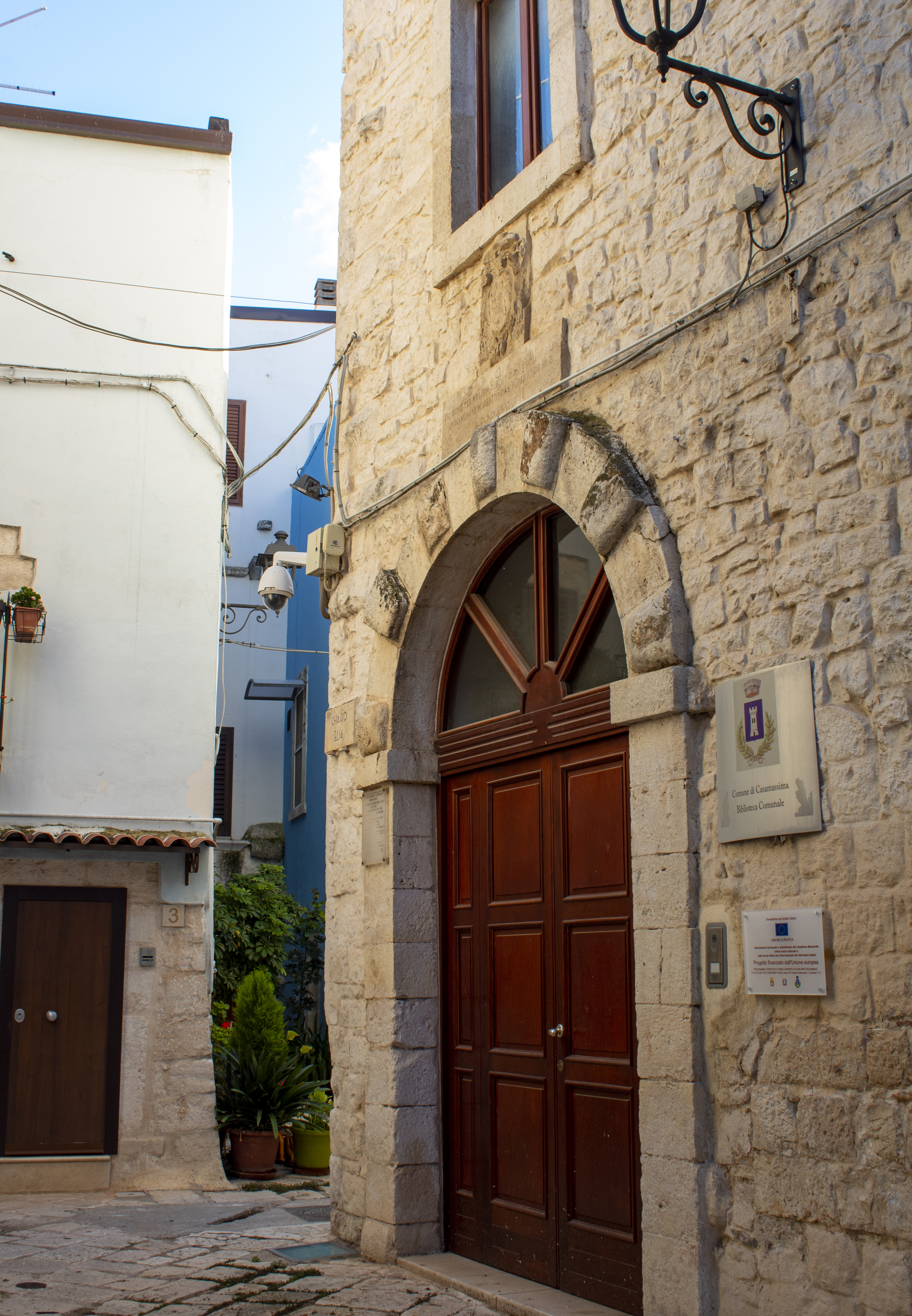
Palazzo Monacelle. Entrance from the Borgo Antico.

Auditorium dell'Addolorata.

Former church of 1800 in baroque style, built by Don Domenico Console and annexed to the Conservatory of Monacelle. Today it is a very popular auditorium for conferences, presentations and concerts. It has a beautiful bell tower with onion cusp.

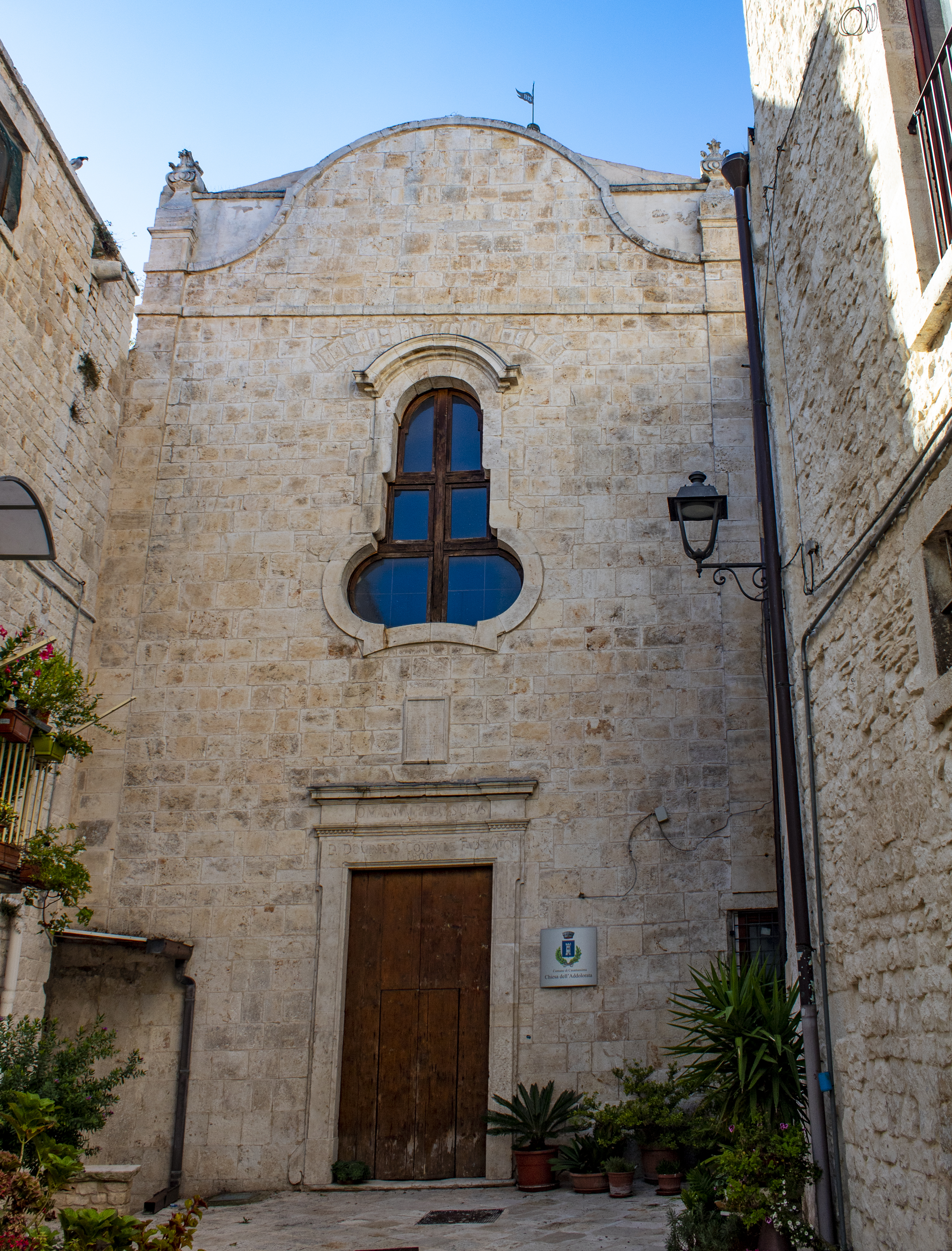
Auditorium Chiesa dell'Addolorata

Church of Purgatory.

Baroque style building with an imposing bell tower, built between 1722 and 1758 in the central Piazza Aldo Moro. It is high above the street level and has a large churchyard, it has a single nave with numerous chapels inside. It houses the Confraternity of Purgatory and the statue of Our Lady of Carmine, patron saint of city.

Abbazia di San Lorenzo

Throughout Puglia, during the X and XI centuries there were some abbeys of monks, one of which was that of San Lorenzo in Casamassima. The documents that are kept in the archive of the Basilica of San Nicola di Bari show that the small convent built before 984 A.D. was a Benedictine center. Unfortunately, today only the church remains, located about 2500 meters from Casamassima, on the road to Turi, in a characteristic blade.

It represents a fine example of sacred rural architecture with frescoes. The construction is in large stone ashlars and the roof consists of a double pitched roof with terracotta tiles. The main facade has a small door with shaped jambs on which there is a protiro with a niche and a bell-shaped sail.

At the rear there is a small semicircular apse that creates a rhythmic alternation of volumes, with another more protruding on the left. The inner vault is a barrel.

=== Civil architecture ===
==== Watch stand ====
Porta Orologio, in Piazza Aldo Moro, is the main access to the village. Once it consisted of the only lower part called Porta dei Molini, because it led to the mills of the Duke.

In 1841 it was enlarged on a project by the architect Angelo Michele Pesce with the construction of the tower with the clock, surmounted by a small temple with Doric columns. Under the arch an eighteenth-century fresco of the Madonna del Soccorso.

In the same square there are also the church of Purgatory, one of the most important churches in the country along with the mother church (which is located in the historic center) and a monument to the Victory. In the historic center, in addition to the aforementioned Mother Church, there is the "castle" (actually a noble palace), the former orphanage Addolorata (also called Monacelle), the former convent of Santa Chiara. Another noteworthy place of Casamassima is the Polish Cemetery at Casamassima, visibile from S.S.100 Bari-Taranto.

==== Palazzo Amenduni ====
The palace is located near Via Castello and is one of the largest, imposing and important palaces of the ancient village of Casamassima. It is a seventeenth-century building, similar to a fort, with a small terrace overlooking Via Castello and a longer one on the back elevation with a large garden. The main portal is dominated by an eighteenth-century balcony (more specifically a mugnano); on the key of the arch there is the coat of arms of the family of nobles Amenduni.

==== Ducal Palace Vaaz ====
It is one of the most important attractions of the village, also witness of the "traces of blue" on the facades, which still retains the original structure. Built in 1100, it was an old manor house, residence of the feudal lords Vaaz, Jewish family of Portuguese origin. During the years, until 1800, resided the Acquaviva d'Aragona, the De Ponte and the Caracciolo. The access is characterized by a precious and refined sixteenth-century portal, with the traditional diamond-pointed ashlar of the sixteenth century inspired by Spanish.

==== Monacelle palace ====
Located in the current Via Roma, former Palazzo De Bellis. It was adapted to Convento Monacelle when the last owner donated it to the Orphanage of Our Lady of Sorrows. The name "Monacelle" comes from the clothes of the poor young women who were welcomed here and hosted to remove them from the streets.

==== Arch of Shadows ====
According to an ancient legend the arch was home to ghosts, who passed continuously inside. This belief derives from the fact that, when there was still no public illumination and you transited with lights and candles, observing the bow from a distance, the shadows of the silhouettes of those who passed through it gave the impression of the presence of ghosts. The shadow arch is today one of the only monuments still covered in blue.

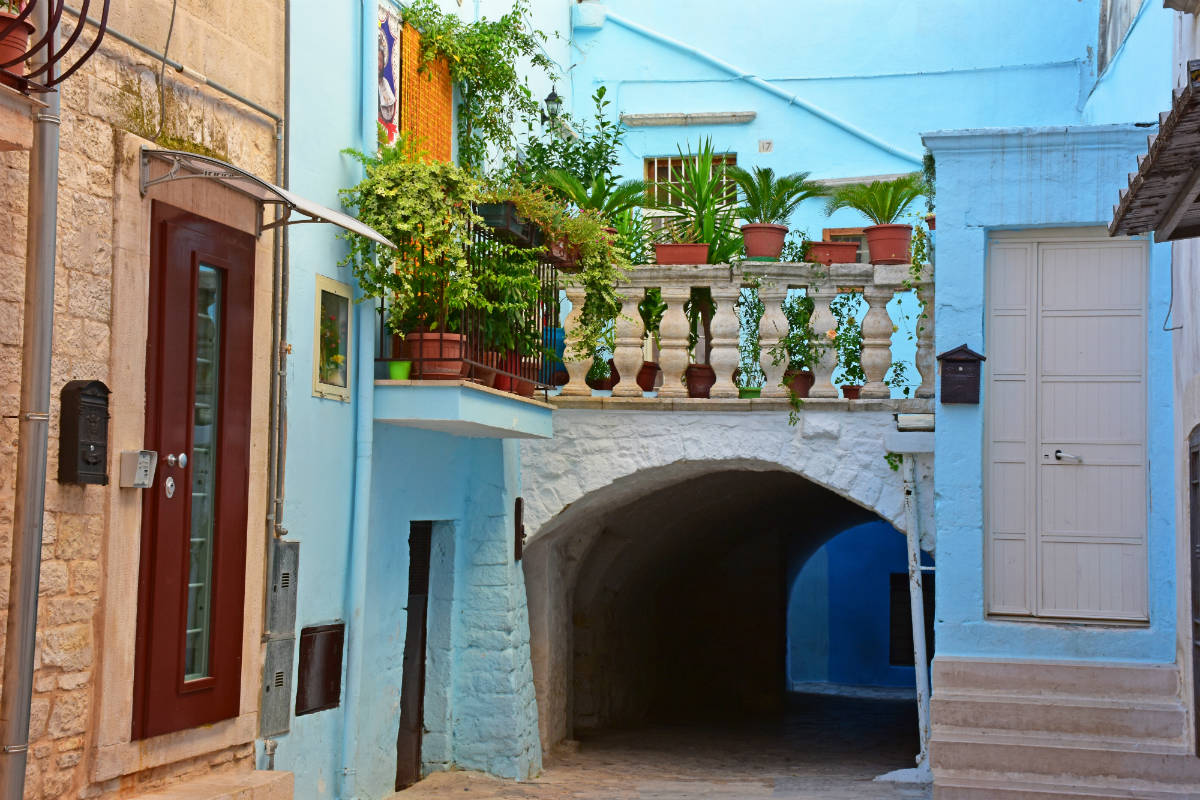
Arch of shadows

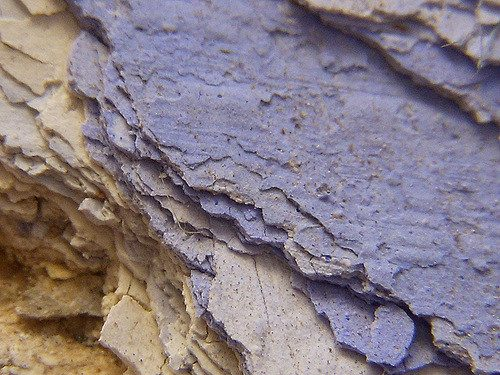
Casamassima, traces of blue

==== Arch of Our Lady of Constantinople ====
Under the arch in Via Santa Chiara appears the seventeenth-century fresco of the Madonna of Constantinople, whose cloak was inspired by Duke Vaaz to paint the village blue, as a vow to have the people protected from the plague. From here you are close to the ancient district Scesciola.

==== Rione Scesciola ====
Very particular district, with the fascinating Arabic name "Shawash'ala" (labyrinth) and where the blue begins to leak from the walls with its suggestive stratifications. It is a district of small rural houses characterized by a room on the ground floor (Sottano), a room on the raised floor (soprano) and reached by an external stone staircase, called vignale. On the sides of the only window there are cantilevered shelves to support a wooden board to dry figs or other.

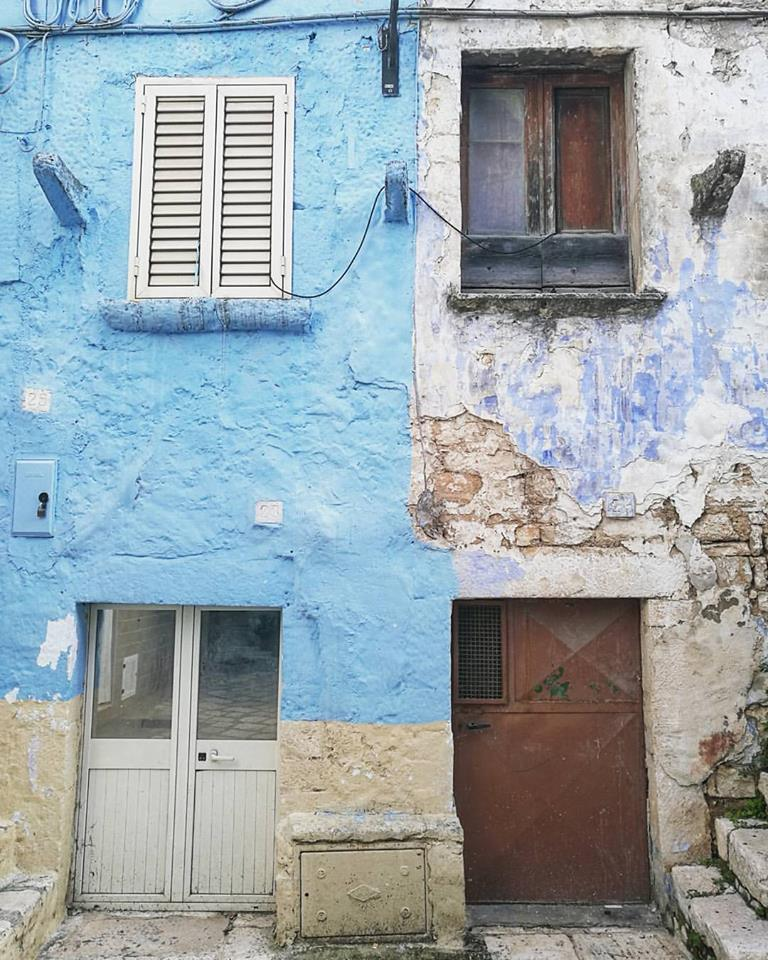
Via Scesciola

==== Via Paliodoro and Chiasso Bongustai ====
Via Paliodoro and Chiasso Bongustai are two streets in the village that are known for their blue painted facades. Via Paliodoro, the village's most blue street, is lined with rural houses, many of which have been renovated and decorated with flowers and traditional objects. Several plaques awarded by the Pro Loco recognise the restorations. Continuing down the Via Sacramento leads to Chiasso Bongustai, a narrow lane that that contains the former oven of the Duke.

==== Home of the poet Nazariantz ====
Hrand Nazariantz is an Armenian poet who lived in Casamassima.

=== Military architecture ===
==== Polish Cemetery at Casamassima "Korpusu" ====
Near State Road 100 stands the Polish military cemetery, burial place of 429 Poland soldiers fallen in World War II or deceased within the largest Polish health complex in the South that the 2nd Military Corps established in the center of Casamassima.

=== Natural areas ===
==== The forest of Marcedd ====
The forest of Marcedd (or forest of Marcello) is the largest green area of the country; it is rich in landscape elements and unique nature trails and cycling. It is located about three kilometers southeast of the town, near the farm Uaciduzzo-Paglia Arsa and the bed of Lama San Giorgio.

The area was once the bed of a river that departed from Mount Sannace of Gioia del Colle and is characterized by the presence of low and sparse scrub, with groups of essences mostly shrubby: il lentisco, the Phillyrea and the Calicotome spinosa, to which the Quercus coccifera, the Olive, the Osiris, the asparagus, the Sicilian tea, il cistus Monspeliencis and the perastro. Rarely it is possible to find specimens of Quercus trojana and Quercus pubescens.

Much richer in species are the sub steppe paths of the wood characterized mostly by the presence of graminaceae, annual and perennial, of different species. Among the grasses we remember the Stipa austroitalica, a species considered priority by the Habitat Directive of the European Union. The Marcedd Forest is part of a project to build a regional nature reserve.

== Society ==
Inhabitants as registered by Istituto Nazionale di Statistica.

=== Ethnic groups and foreign minorities ===
- China 357
- Romania 71
- Georgia 59
- Pakistan 25

=== Traditions and folklore ===
Pinata of Casamassima

In 1977 during a carnival festival a pot was the protagonist of the event and from the next edition a group of artists gave birth to the first association of carriages and artists of papier-mâché: the association U Car. The Pentolaccia began to be known at a regional level thanks to parades of floats, performances of dance schools, masked groups and special guests during the first weekend of Lent. The event has been awarded the Medal of the High Patronage of the President of Italy and since 2016 is part of the Historical Carnivals of Ministry of i Cultural Heritage and Activities (Italy).

Corteo Storico Corrado IV di Svevia

The event usually takes place on the second Sunday of October and evokes a historical episode really happened in April 1252, documented by an original parchment preserved in the Historical Archive of the Library of Bari. Conrad IV of Germany, son and heir apparent of the Emperor Frederick II, Holy Roman Emperor crossed the land of Casamassima and returned the fief to Roberto da Casamaxima, whose father Giovanni had been taken away by Frederick II. The historical re-enactment is attended by four hundred people dressed in medieval clothes who are accompanied by street artists, flag wavers, musicians, dancers, fire eaters, knights, jugglers and theater. The event takes place under the auspices of the Presidency of the Republic, the Honorary Consulates in Bari of the Federal Republic of Germany and the Kingdom of Belgium, bearing two medals of the President of Italy.

== Culture ==
=== Library ===
Municipal library, located within Palazzo Monacelle, has about 10,000 volumes, including more than 300 antique and high value books.The municipal library is attached to the separate section of the Municipal Historical Archive, established in 1983, which contains documents from 1808 onwards and is under the protection of the Archival and Bibliographic Superintendence of the Apulia.

=== School ===
Two educational circles, two first grade secondary schools and a high school named after the Armenian poet Hrand Nazariantz.

=== University ===
At the Baricentro is located the headquarters of the university LUM – Libera Università Mediterranea.

=== Theater ===
Casamassima boasted a notable cultural space, the former Cinema Teatro Augusto, demolished to build new homes. The works and theater exhibitions are organized by the local theater association "ACCA (Cultural Association Casamassimese Apulia)" and staged at the Urban Laboratory "Officine UFO", located in Via Amendola within the former court.

=== Cinema ===
In Casamassima were filmed films, fiction and short films:

- Duel at the Rio Grande (film 1963)
- Uerra (2009), short film awarded as "best international short film"
- Pietro Mennea – La freccia del Sud (2015), fiction Rai 1
- In the movie "The Band of Honest Men", Totò (who plays the palace porter, Antonio Buonocore) quotes in a cameo the city of Casamassima, when in storing the envelopes of mail in the boxes of the condominiums he says to himself :"Altobelli... Casamassima". The easter egg is soon explained: Renato Altobelli, projectionist of a cinema in Bari and later established himself as a photographer of the village of Casamassima, was a great friend of Totò, who had decided to cite him in this original way.
- Liberi di scegliere (2018), fiction Rai 1
- Ricchi di Fantasia (2018), film
- Latrin Lover (2019), web serie with Ninni Di Lauro and Piero Bagnardi

Casamassima has two patrons: Our Lady of Mount Carmel, which is celebrated on the last Sunday of July, and Saint Roch, which is celebrated on the second Sunday of September. The statue of the saint is carried in procession with a rich silver cloak donated by the emigrants of Casamassima and covered with gold jewels, donated from year to year by the devotees for grace requested or received. Coinciding with the beginning of the days of the school year, there is a saying that reads: "To San Rocco, leave the ball and take the bow", referring to how you should leave the games (symbolized by the ball), to put the bow back (typical of school aprons of 20th century).

Another local tradition is that of the 40-year-old girls (seven dolls: Anna, Pagano, Rebecca, Susanna, Lazzaro, Palma and Pasqua).These are exhibited at the beginning of Lent then, every Sunday off Lent, one is removed until Easter.

The town can be reached easily through the main routes Bari-Taranto or:

- SS 100 di Gioia del Colle
- SS 172 dei Trulli

=== Railway ===
The country is linked to the rest of Apulia via the railway line of Ferrovie del Sud Est.

La Casamassima railway station is placed on the route "Bari-Putignano (via Casamassima)" of the Ferrovie del Sud Est and connects the country with the capital of the Region and other neighboring municipalities by trains every hour.

== List of mayors ==
Period		Office holder	Party	Title	Notes
26 October 1988	1º December 1989	Romano Franco Bardoscia	DC	Mayor	
1º December 1989	8 June 1993	Domenico Antonio Orofino	DC	Mayor	
8 June 1993	28 April 1997	Maria Paola Susca Bonerba Pierini		Mayor	
28 June 1997	14 May 2001	Maria Paola Susca Bonerba Pierini	Left-wing coalition	Mayor	
14 May 2001	7 October 2002	Giuseppe Emilio Carelli	Centre-right coalition	Mayor	
18 November 2002	27 May 2003	Rosa Maria Padovano		Commissioner	
10 June 2003	13 April 2008	Domenico Vito De Tommaso	Centre-left coalition	Mayor	
29 April 2008	30 November 2010	Domenico Vito De Tommaso	Centre-left coalition	Mayor	
30 December 2010	17 June 2011	Cinzia Carreri		Commissioner	
31 May 2011	12 September 2014	Domenico Birardi	PPT, UDC, PDL, NPSI, MPS, NS	Mayor	
12 September 2014	16 June 2015	Alfonso Magnatta		Commissioner	
16 June 2015	31 July 2017	Vito Cessa	RI, Civic lists, SEL, PD	Mayor	
1 August 2017	24 June 2018	Aldo Aldi		Commissioner	
24 June 2018	In office	Giuseppe Nitti	Civic lists	Mayor	

== Transportation ==
The settlement is connected with the Bari-Putignano railroad line and the Bari-Gioia Del Colle-Taranto highway.

== See also ==
- Polish Cemetery at Casamassima
