= Libera Università Mediterranea =

Private university in Italy

Coordinates: 40.9740°N 16.9167°E

- Type: Private
- Established: 1995
- Rector: Antonello Garzoni
- Location: Casamassima, Italy
- Website: www.lum.it

Libera Università Mediterranea (also LUM University or Free Mediterranean University) is an Italian private university founded in 1995, in Casamassima, Metropolitan City of Bari, Italy. The main building of the university is set in the industrial and directional center called "Baricentro", in Casamassima.

== History ==
LUM "Giuseppe Degennaro" (until 2020 "Jean Monnet") University was founded in 1995; beginning in 2000, the university has been regularly recognised by the Educational and Research Ministry in 2000. The LUM University School of Management was established in 2004.

== Departments ==
DEPARTMENT OF MEDICINE AND SURGERY • Master's Degree in Medicine and Surgery • Three-year degree in Nursing • Master's Degree in Dentistry and Dental Prosthetics.

DEPARTMENT OF MANAGEMENT, FINANCE AND TECHNOLOGY • Three-year degree in Economics and Business Organization • Master's Degree in Economics and Management

DEPARTMENT OF LEGAL AND BUSINESS SCIENCES • M.Sc. in Law

ENGINEERING DEPARTMENT • Three-year degree in Management Engineering • Bachelor's Degree in Computer Engineering • Master's Degree in Management Engineering<Lum.it>

== Double Degrees ==
The Department of Management, Finance and Technology has activated Double Degree for the three-year degree in Economics and Business Organization with the universities:

Dublin Business School, Ireland, Ireland Pontifícia Universidade Católica do Paraná, Curitiba, Brazil

The Department of Legal and Business Sciences has activated Double Degree for the single-cycle master's degree with:

Maurer School of Law, Indiana University (USA)
