= Vittorio Miele =

Italian painter

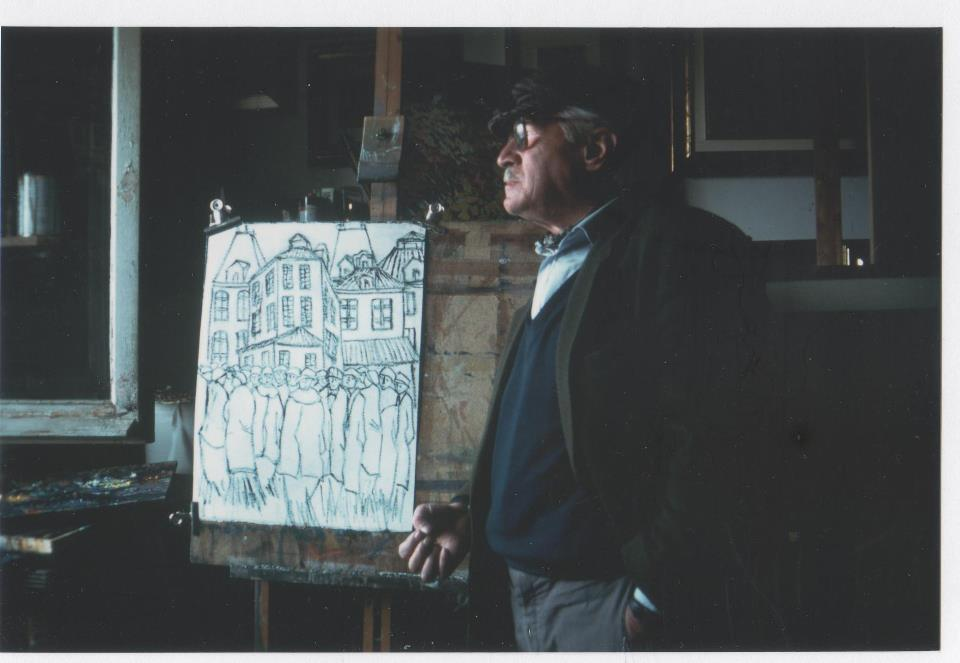
- Vittorio Miele
- Born: November 24, 1926; Cassino, Kingdom of Italy
- Died: November 18, 1999 (aged 72); Cassino, Italy
- Known for: oil painting, drawing, mixed media

Vittorio Miele (November 24, 1926 – November 18, 1999) was an Italian painter.

== Biography ==
Vittorio Miele was born in Cassino in 1926 and he lived the tragedy of the Second World War, during the Battle of Monte Cassino where his father and his little sister died. His mother later died of her injuries.

Miele survived and he went to Northern Italy. In 1958, he participated in the Mantova City National Art Exhibition and in 1966 he had his first one-man exhibition in Frosinone.

In 1969, with the painting "Il Dolore" he was awarded the second prize at the International Painting Exhibition in Piervert, France, and with the painting "Case di Ciociaria" he was awarded the first prize at the Exhibition "Figurative Arts Province" in Rome.

In 1971, the Administration of the Republic of San Marino invited him to hold a one-man exhibition at the Ridotto of the Titano Theatre. In July 1971, thousands of people visited this exhibition.

In 1972, some of his paintings were chosen, together with those of De Chirico, Campigli, Gentilini, Cantore and Greco for a collective exhibition in the "2000" Gallery in Tokyo, the only gallery specialized in the presentation and popularisation of contemporary art in Japan. His international experience enriches after only one year. In June 1973, with "L'ultimo Gradino" and "Passaggio Ciociaro" he is present in the Arts Pavillon in Sarajevo.

In October, the Provincaial Tourist Organization in Frosinone awarded him the gold medal for "having contributed to the revival of Art in Ciociaria". In Autumn 1974 was ready for his first trip to North America. The Canadian press and television present the exhibitions Miele holds in the major Canadian cities. In October he exhibited, with great success, over one hundred paintings in Place Bonaventure in Montreal. In November he held a one-man exhibition in Toronto at the Hilton Hotel and also participated with other important contemporary artists at the Fine Arts Gallery exhibition. Miele worked hard during those two months, even outdoors, trying to physically capture the harsh climate in his paintings. Paintings of particular interest remain from that Canadian period, linked to that fatal symbiosis established between the master's "provincial luggage" and the temerarious clash with immeasurable perfectionism. The Nordic houses become Ciociaria countryside cottages.

In the 1970s, he was invited to Yugoslavia, guest of the State Artist Colony in Počitelj. There he discovered the freshness of the oriental archaic culture. He began to paint outdoors again, the style become less "harsh", the Bosnian mountains become "rounded" and the shadows are softly superimposed. He discovered a luminosity lost in his years of travelling.

After a lot of other expositions in Italy and in the US, in 1991, he exhibited at the European Parliament.

He died in his home in Cassino on 18 November 1999, after many months of lucid agony.
