= Monte Cassino Polish war cemetery =

Graveyard from the Battle of Monte Cassino

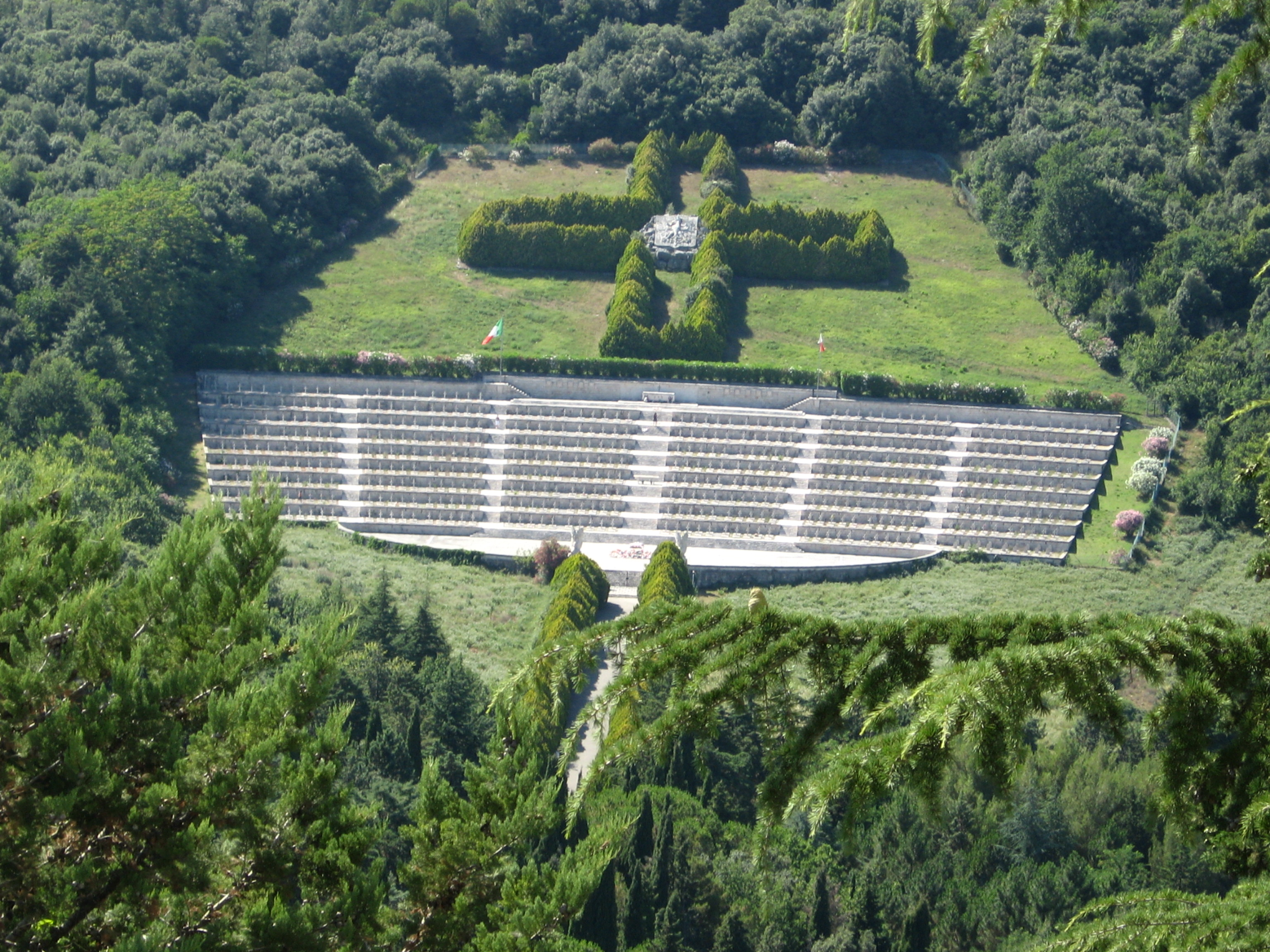
- The Polish cemetery as seen from Monte Cassino monastery
- Interactive map of Monte Cassino Polish war cemetery

Details
- Established: 1944
- Location: Monte Cassino
- Country: Italy
- Coordinates: 41.49384°N 13.80587°E
- Type: Polish soldiers
- No. of graves: 1,072

The Polish war cemetery at Monte Cassino holds the graves of 1,072 Poles who died storming the bombed-out Benedictine abbey atop the mountain in May 1944, during the Battle of Monte Cassino. The cemetery is maintained by the Council for the Protection of Memorial Sites of Struggle and Martyrdom.

The religious affiliations of the deceased are indicated by three types of headstone: Christian crosses for Roman Catholic and Eastern Orthodox and Jewish headstones bearing the Star of David.

The cemetery also holds the grave of General Władysław Anders, who had commanded the Polish forces that captured Monte Cassino. Anders died in London in 1970 and his ashes were interred in the cemetery.

The cemetery itself can be clearly viewed from the Abbey, which lies just a few hundred meters away.

The cemetery is the closest of all allied cemeteries, symbolizing the importance of the Polish fighters during the battle. It was the Poles that are credited with liberating the abbey from Axis forces. As such, their war dead were honored with being buried in such close proximity to the structure for which they died liberating.

== History ==
The cemetery is located on the slopes of what was designated as Point 445 and the abbey on the mountain of Monte Cassino. The majority of the soldiers buried here are from the Polish 2nd Army Corps of Lieutenant General Władysław Anders. Soldiers from this corps repeatedly attacked the German defenders inside the monastery at Monte Cassino during May 1944. On the morning of 18 May 1944, Polish forces finally entered the ruins of the abbey and hoisted the Polish flag.

The first interments in the cemetery occurred in 1944 and the cemetery was completed in 1946 based on designs by Wacław Hryniewicz and Jerzy Skolimowski. The official consecration of the site took place on September 1, 1945.

== Inscriptions ==
The Polish memorial at Monte Cassino bears two inscriptions. The first, based on the Epitaph of Simonides, reads:

Passer-by, go tell Poland
That we have perished obedient to her service

The other on a gatepost near the entrance translates from Polish:

For our freedom and yours
We soldiers of Poland gave
Our soul to God
Our life to the soil of Italy
Our hearts to Poland

An anthem, "The Red Poppies on Monte Cassino" — composed on the eve of the Polish storming of the German stronghold — memorializes the Polish soldiers who gave their lives. The refrain is familiar to most Poles:

The red poppies on Monte Cassino
Drank Polish blood instead of dew...
O'er the poppies the soldiers did go
'Mid death, and to their anger stayed true!
Years will come and ages will go,
Enshrining their strivings and their toil!...
And the poppies on Monte Cassino
Will be redder for Poles' blood in their soil.

== Gallery ==
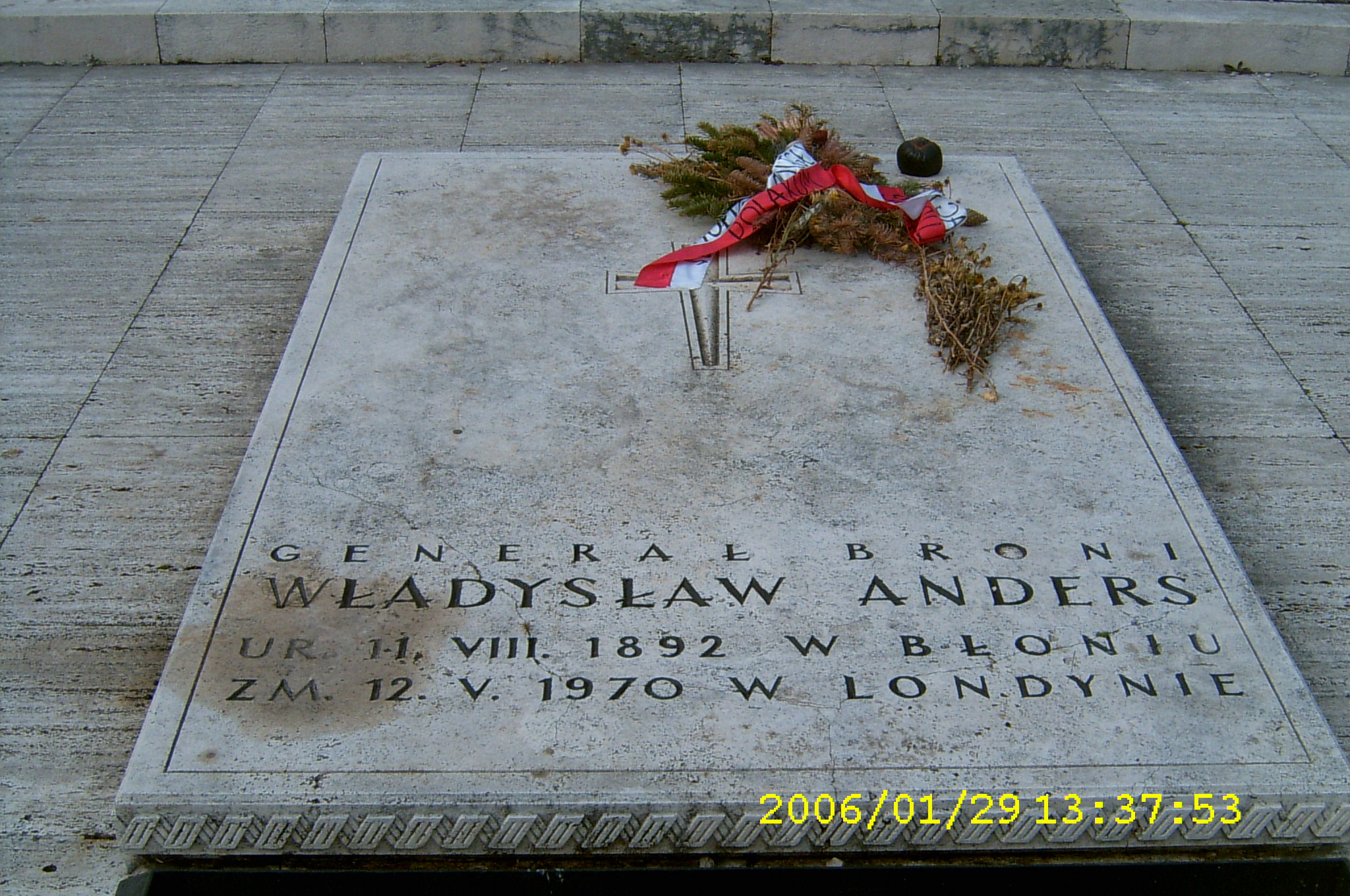
Gravestone of Lieutenant General Władysław Anders at Monte Cassino

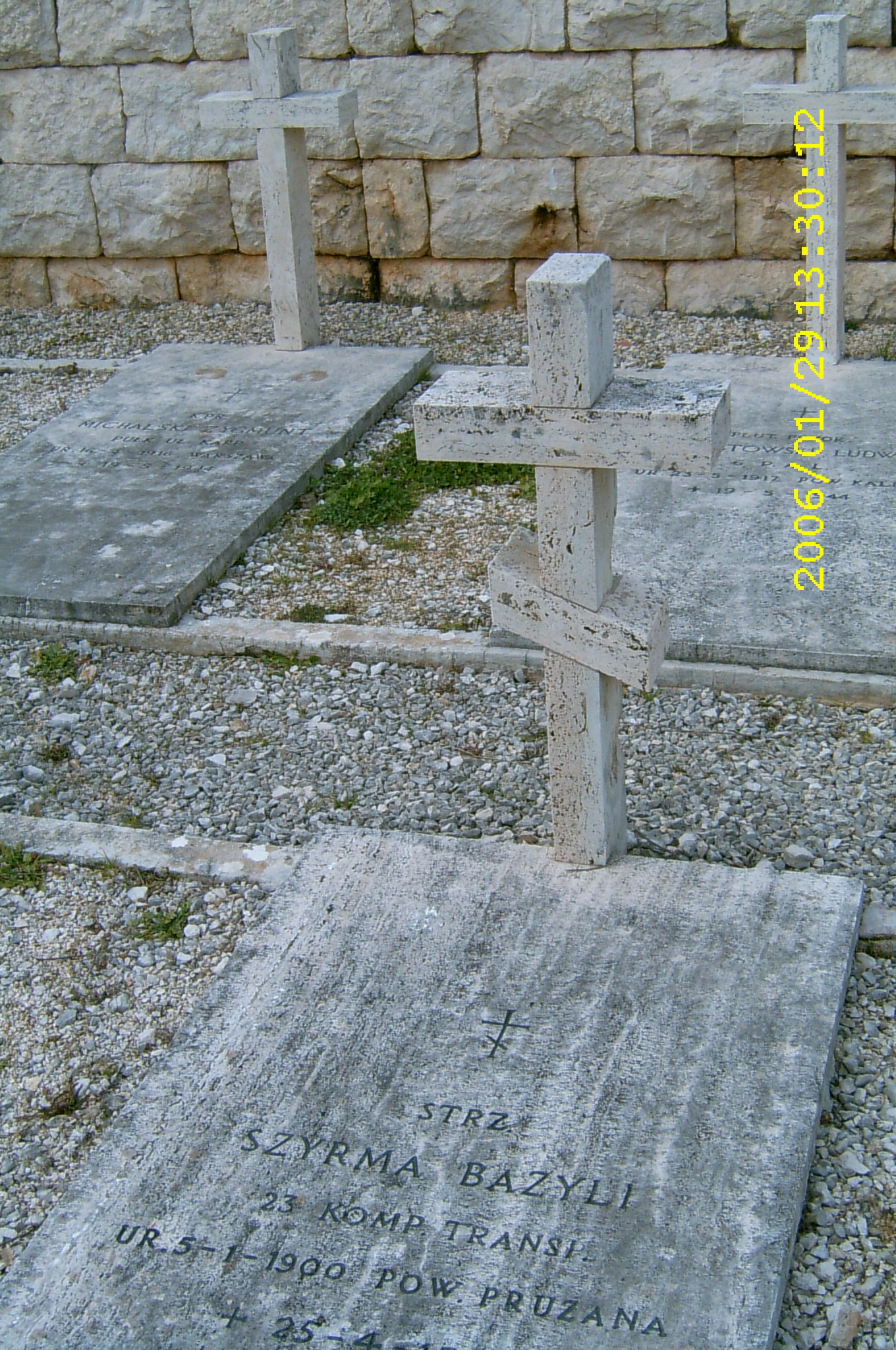
Orthodox (front) and Catholic (rear) gravestones at Monte Cassino

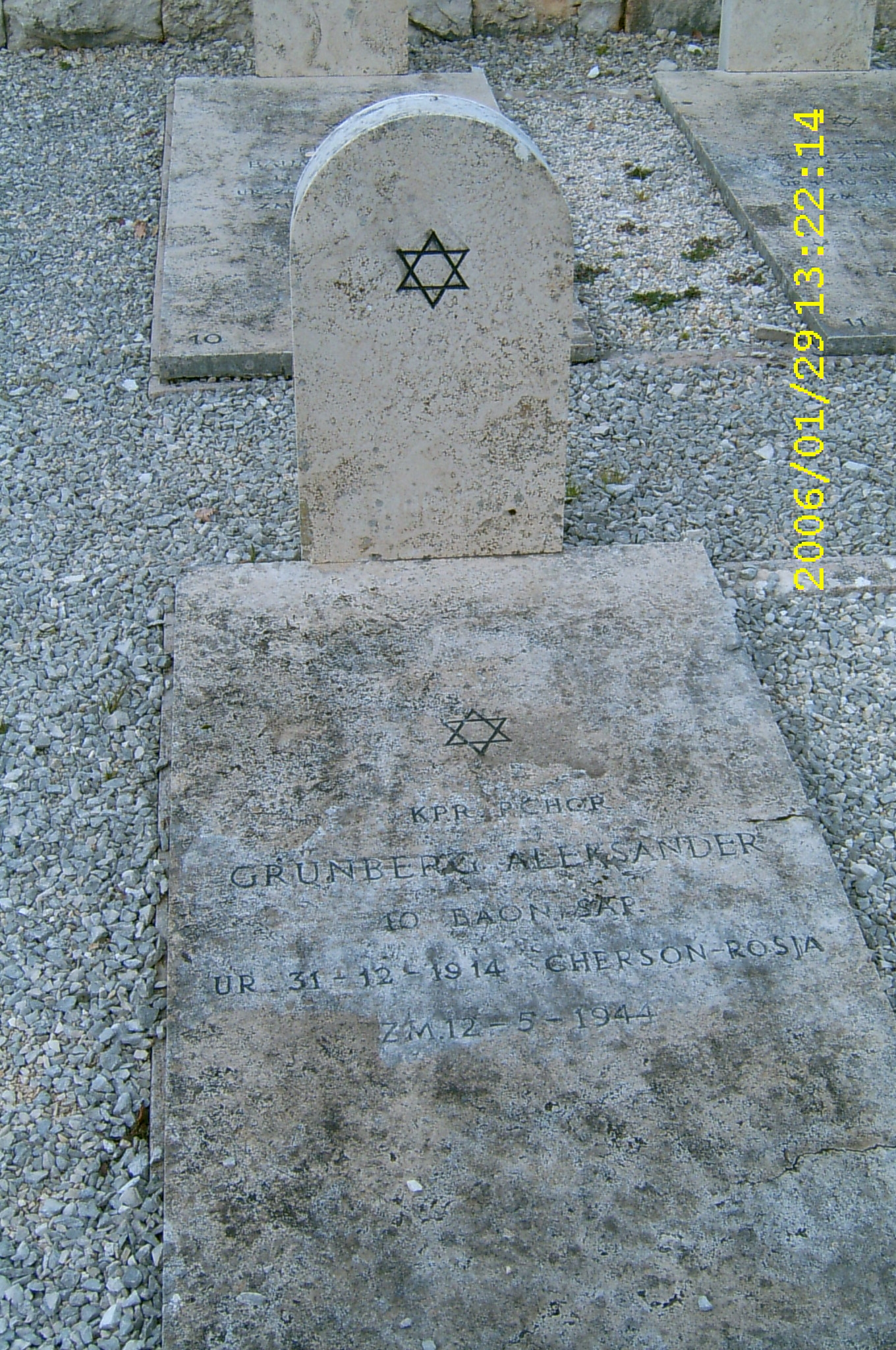
Jewish gravestone at Monte Cassino

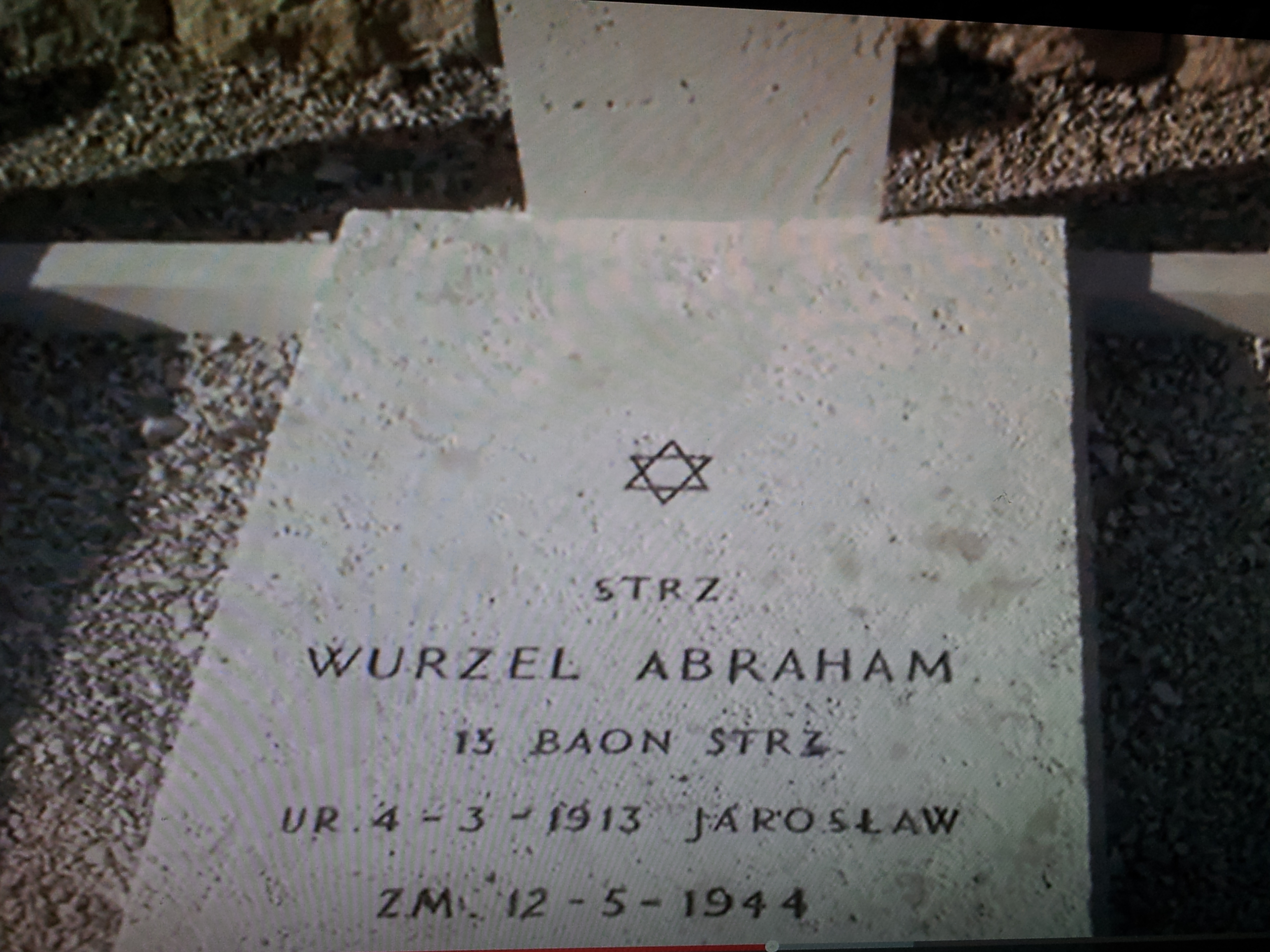
Another Jewish gravestone

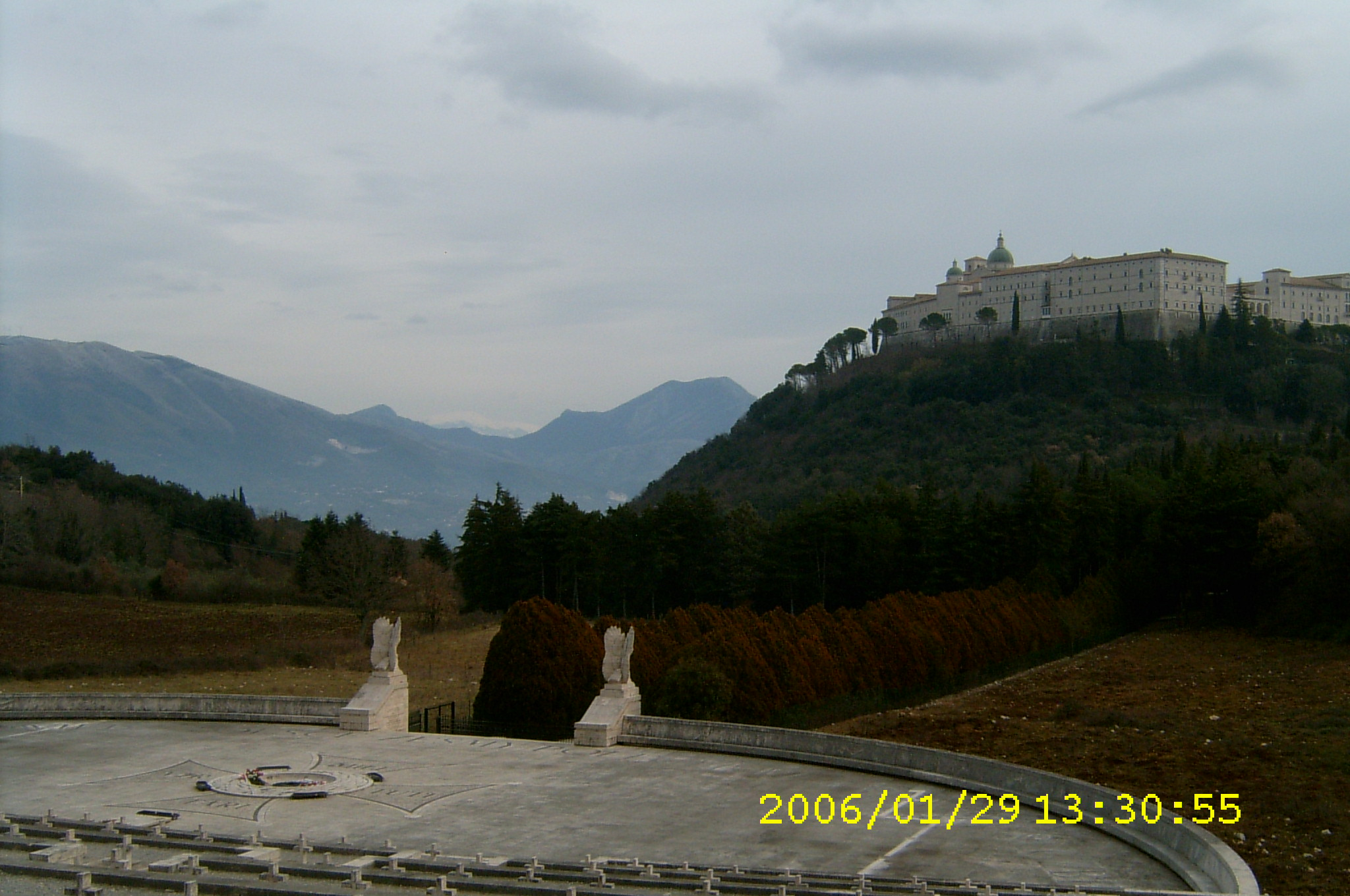
View of Monte Cassino monastery from the Polish cemetery

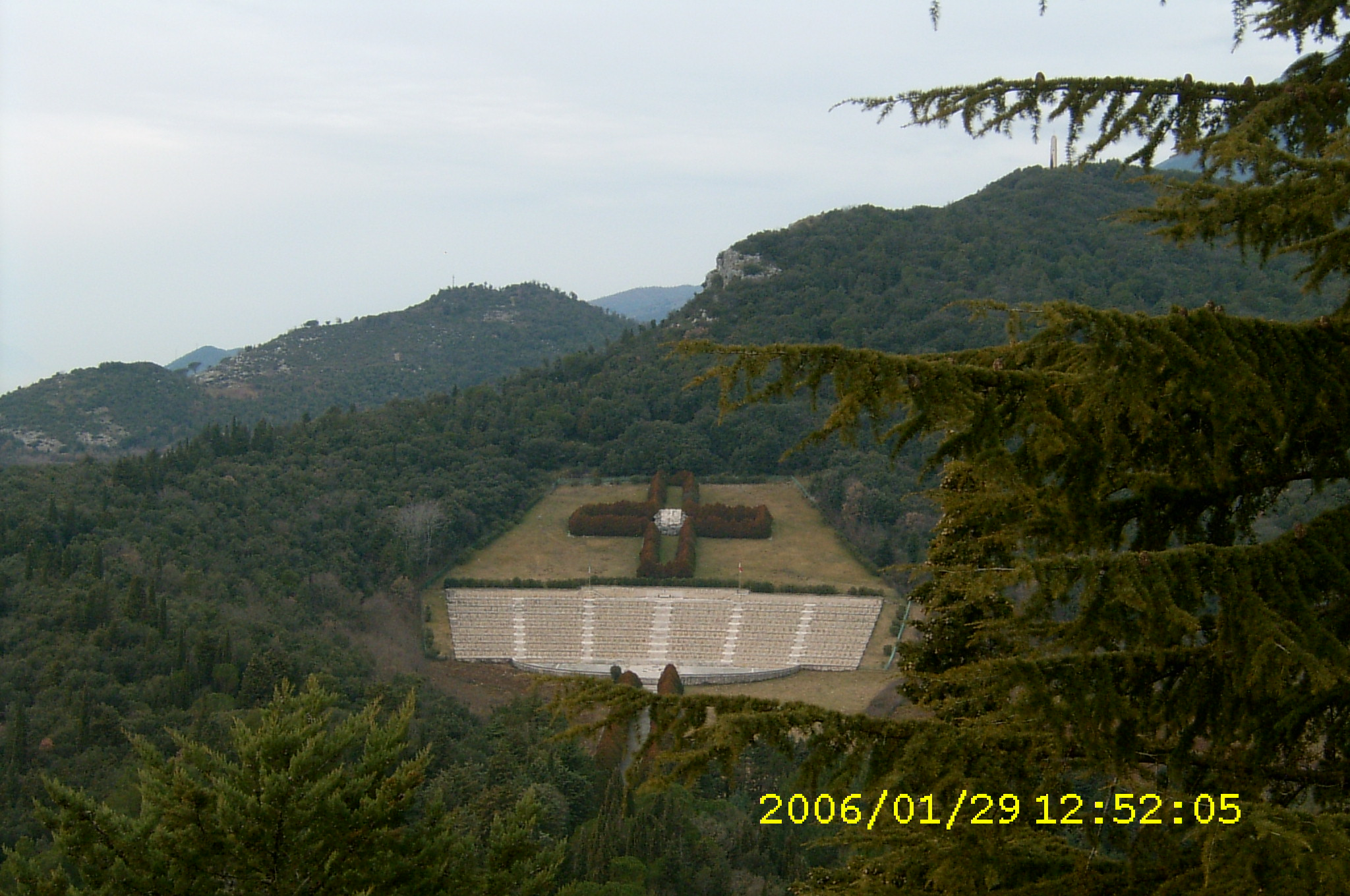
The Polish cemetery seen from Monte Cassino monastery

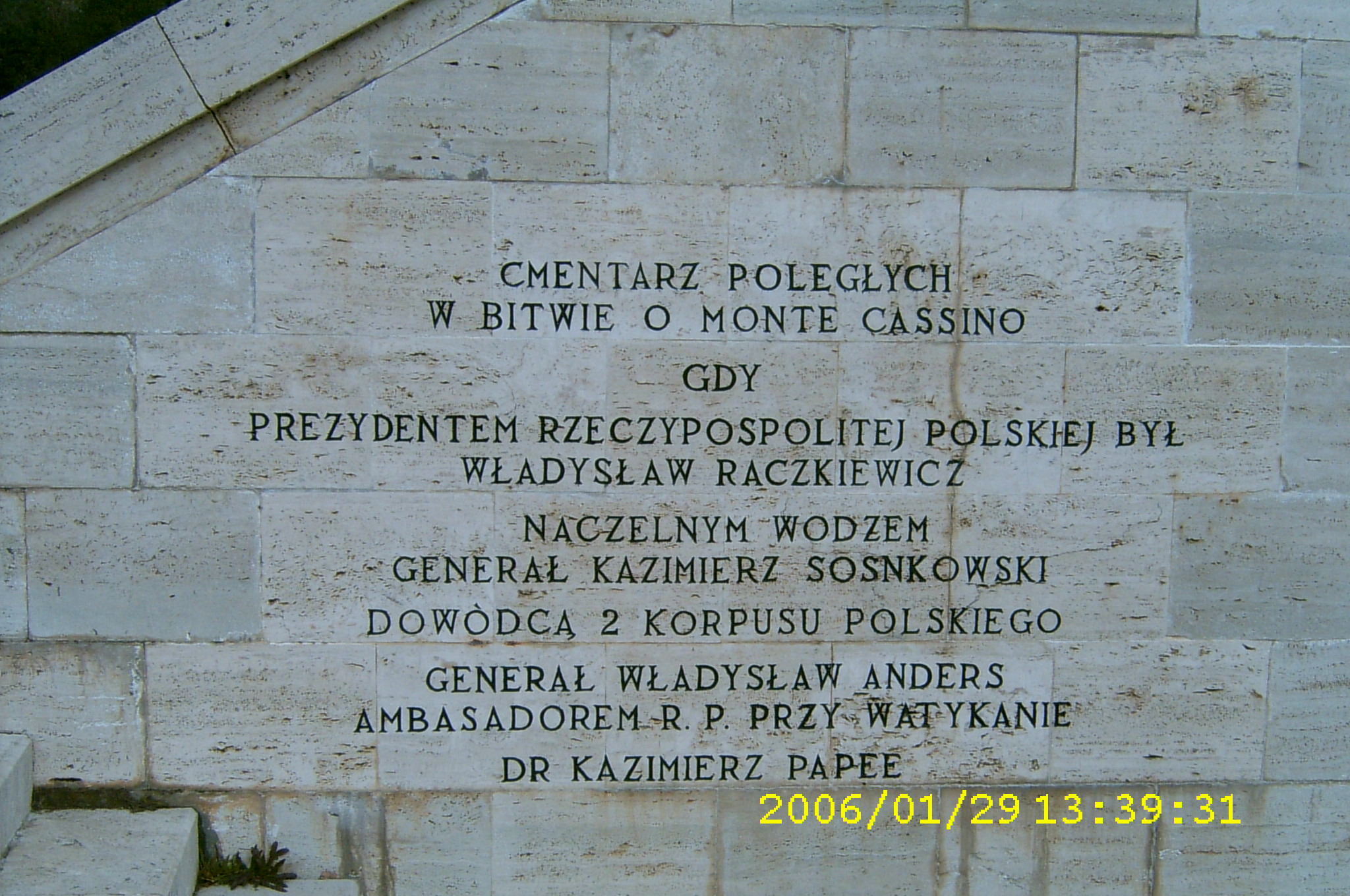
Plaque at the Polish cemetery

== See also ==
- Cassino War Cemetery
- Polish Cemetery in Bandar-e Anzali
- Polish Military Cemetery at Casamassima
