= Monte Cairo =

Mountain in Italy

Coordinates: 41.542°N 13.7600°E

Highest point
- Elevation: 1,669 m (5,476 ft)
- Prominence: 1,165 m (3,822 ft)
- Listing: Ribu

Monte Cairo (1,669 m) is a mountain in Lazio (in the province of Frosinone), overshadowing both the Abbey and the town of Monte Cassino, 5 kilometres to the south. The ancient 'Mons Clarius' was so called because originally a temple dedicated to Apollo (Clarius) stood where the Abbey of Monte Cassino now stands. This massif, commonly referred to as the Monte Cairo group, stretches eastwards from the upper Melfa valley over roughly 15–20 km, as can be seen on regional topographic maps and route descriptions.

== Geology ==
Monte Cairo is situated in Italy's central peninsula which is dominated by active extensional tectonics. The geological structure is of limestone dating from the Cretaceous period and due to its position in the region the formation is known to experience earthquakes and subsidence.

The tops of the mountains are barren, in contrast to the partially wooded sides.

== Climbing ==
The top of the mountain is a 4-hour hike along a path through beech groves and across a plateau of snow. The vista from the top includes Appennino Marsicano (Monti Marsicani), the Mainarde, the Monti della Meta, the Matese, the sea up to Gaeta, the Pontine Islands, Mount Vesuvius, and the Abbey of Montecassino.

At an altitude of 1,300 m and west of Monte Cairo lies the Monte Pozzacone Refuge, a property owned by the town of Colle San Magno and a suitable base for climbing to the top of Monte Cairo. Other peaks of the group include the Monte Obachelle (1,476 metres) where there is a significant Karstic sinkhole, the Pizzo di Prato Caselle (1,372 metres), and the Cimmaron Villaneto (1,315 m).
