= Latium adiectum =

Region of Roman Italy

Coordinates: 41°21′N 13°25′E

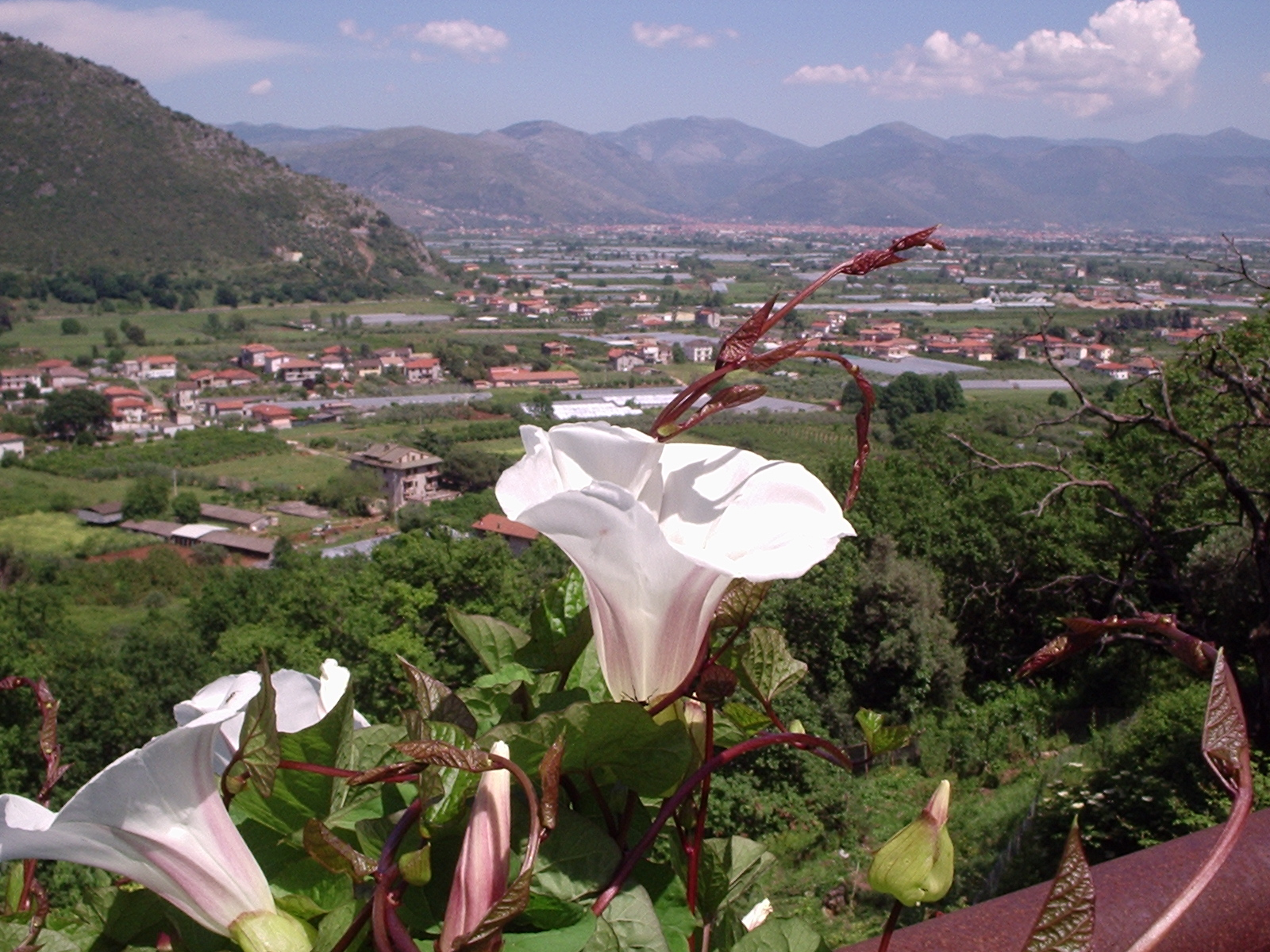
View of Fondi, ancient Fundi, at the foot of the Monti Aurunci in Latium adjectum. The flat country is reclaimed marshland, similar to but not part of the Agro Pontino. It is now called the South Pontino. The Via Appia went through this region on its way south to Campania, which is located beyond the mountains seen in the distance.

Latium adiectum or Latium adjectum (Latin for "Attached" or "Extended Latium") or Latium Novum ("New Latium") was a region of Roman Italy between Monte Circeo and the river Garigliano, south of and immediately adjacent to Old Latium and included with it under the Roman Empire.

== Sources ==
As a geographical term, it was used at least as early as the 1st century AD, when mention of it occurs in Pliny in conjunction with Latium Antiquum, the original territory of the Latin tribe. Says Pliny of the latter:

Its inhabitants have often changed: at various times it has been occupied by various peoples — the Aborigines, the Pelasgi, the Arcades, the Siculi, the Aurunci, the Rutuli ...

Then he speaks of a later extension to the river Garigliano, to include the Volsci, Osci and Ausones. The "last town" in Latium adiectum was Sinuessa.

Pliny's remarks concerning Latium are part of his description of Italy:

...a land which is at once the nurseling and the mother of all other lands, chosen by providence of the gods to make heaven itself more glorious, to unite scattered empires, to make manners gentle, to draw together in converse by community of language the jarring and uncouth tongues of so many nations, to give mankind civilization, and in a word to become throughout the world the single fatherland of all the races.

After waxing yet more eloquent concerning Italy — he was in fact north Italian himself, rather than Roman — he then gives:

an account of a circuit of Italy, and of its cities. Herein it is necessary to premise that we intend to follow the authority of his late Majesty Augustus, and to adopt the division that he made of the whole of Italy into eleven regions ...

Latium and Campania together comprise Region I, of which Latium is divided into Latium Vetus/Antiquus and Latium adiectum/Novum.

== Geography of New Latium ==
It included the Hernican cities of Anagnia (their capital), Ferentinum, Aletrium, and Verulae, a group of mountain strongholds on the north side of the valley of the Trerus (the River Sacco); together with the Volscian cities on the south of the same valley, and in that of the Liris, the whole of which, with the exception of its extreme upper end, was included in the Volscian territory. Here were situated Signia, Frusino, Fabrateria, Fregellae, Sora, Arpinum, Atina, Aquinum, Casinum, and Interamna; Anxur (Terracina) was the only seaport that properly belonged to the Volscians, the coast from there to the mouth of the Liris being included in the territory of the Aurunci, or Ausones as they were termed by Greek writers, who possessed the maritime towns of Fundi, Formiae, Caieta, and Minturnae, together with Suessa in the interior, which had replaced their more ancient capital of Aurunca. Sinuessa, on the seacoast between the Liris (Garigliano) and the Vulturnus, at the foot of the Mons Massicus, was the last town in Latium according to the official use of the term and was sometimes assigned to Campania, while Suessa was more assigned to Latium. On the other hand, as Nissen points out (Italische Landeskunde, ii. 554), the Pons Campanus, by which the Via Appia crossed the Savo some 9 m. SE of Sinuessa, indicates by its name the position of the old Campanian frontier. In the interior the boundary fell between Casinum and Teanum Sidicinum, at about the 100th milestone of the Via Latina, a fact which led later to the jurisdiction of the Roman courts being extended on every side to the 100th mile from the city, and to this being the limit beyond which banishment from Rome was considered to begin.

Though the Apennines comprised within the boundaries of Latium do not rise to a height approaching that of the loftiest summits of the central range, they attain to a considerable altitude, and form steep and rugged mountain masses from 4,000 to 5,000 ft. high. They are traversed by three principal valleys: (1) that of the Anio, now called Aniene (and formerly Teverone), which descends from above Subiaco to Tivoli, where it enters the plain of the Campagna; (2) that of the Trerus (River Sacco), which has its source below Palestrina (Praeneste), and flows through a comparatively broad valley that separates the main mass of the Apennines from the Volscian mountains or Monti Lepini, until it joins the Liris below Ceprano; (3) that of the Liris (Garigliano), which enters the confines of New Latium about 20 m. from its source, flows past the town of Sora, and has a very tortuous course from there to the sea at Minturnae; its lower valley is for the most part of considerable width, and forms a fertile tract of considerable extent, bordered on both sides by hills covered with vines, olives and fruit trees, and thickly studded with towns and villages.

== History ==
Following the Roman conquests, several Roman and Latin colonies were established in the territory. Roman colonies were smaller colonies inhabited by Roman citizens and normally set up along the coast. The internal area of Latium adiectum (today known as Latin Valley), crossed by the Via Latina, was instead colonized through the establishment of Latin colonies, inhabited by Latins and Romans who lost their citizenship.

== See also ==
- Latium — all periods.
- History of Lazio
- Roman sites in Lazio
