= Isoletta =

Coordinates: 41.5279°N 13.5452°E

Isoletta is a village in Italy, in the Valle Latina within the Arce municipality. Isoletta is located in the province of Frosinone, of the southern Lazio region in Italy.

== Geography ==
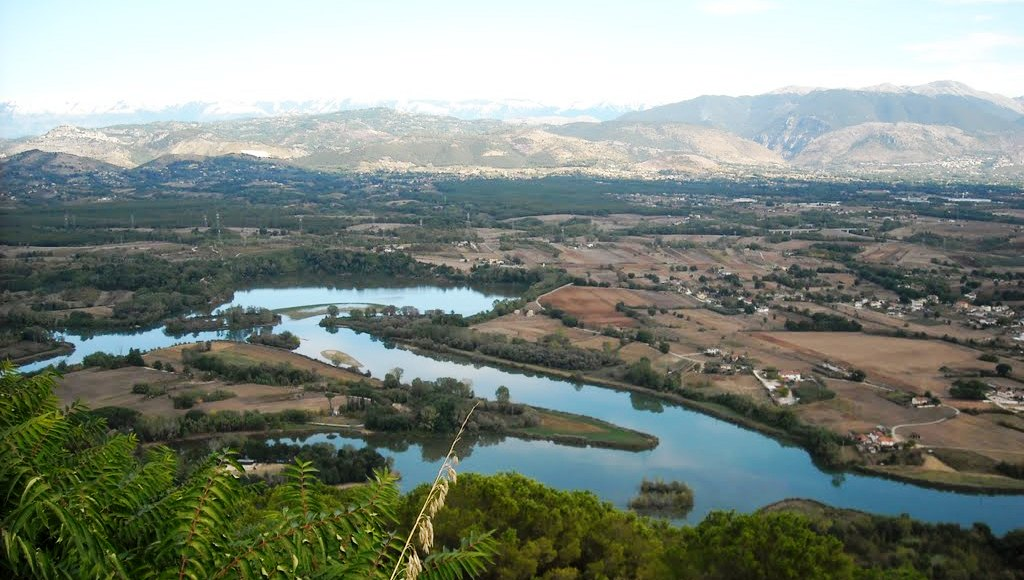
Lago di Isoletta

Isoletta is located in the Frosinone province, approximately 7.36 kilometers north of Arce. It is bordered by San Giovanni Incarico to the southeast, Falvaterra to the southwest, and Ceprano to the northwest. The Liri River and Lake Isoletta, also known as Lake San Giovanni Incarico, are located in this region. The lake was created in 1925 by the Pontefiume Dam to provide water for hydroelectric power generation. Its reservoir has an abundance of aquatic vegetation due to its inflow of phosphorus- and nitrogen-rich organic material from agricultural and residential runoff.

A reserve was established in 1997 in order to protect the area's natural and historical landmarks, including Fregellae, Fabrateria Nova, and the lake of San Giovanni Incarico.

The climate is typical to the Mediterranean region: moderate wet winters and warm humid summers. Isoletta is a prime, tranquil summer destination.

== History ==
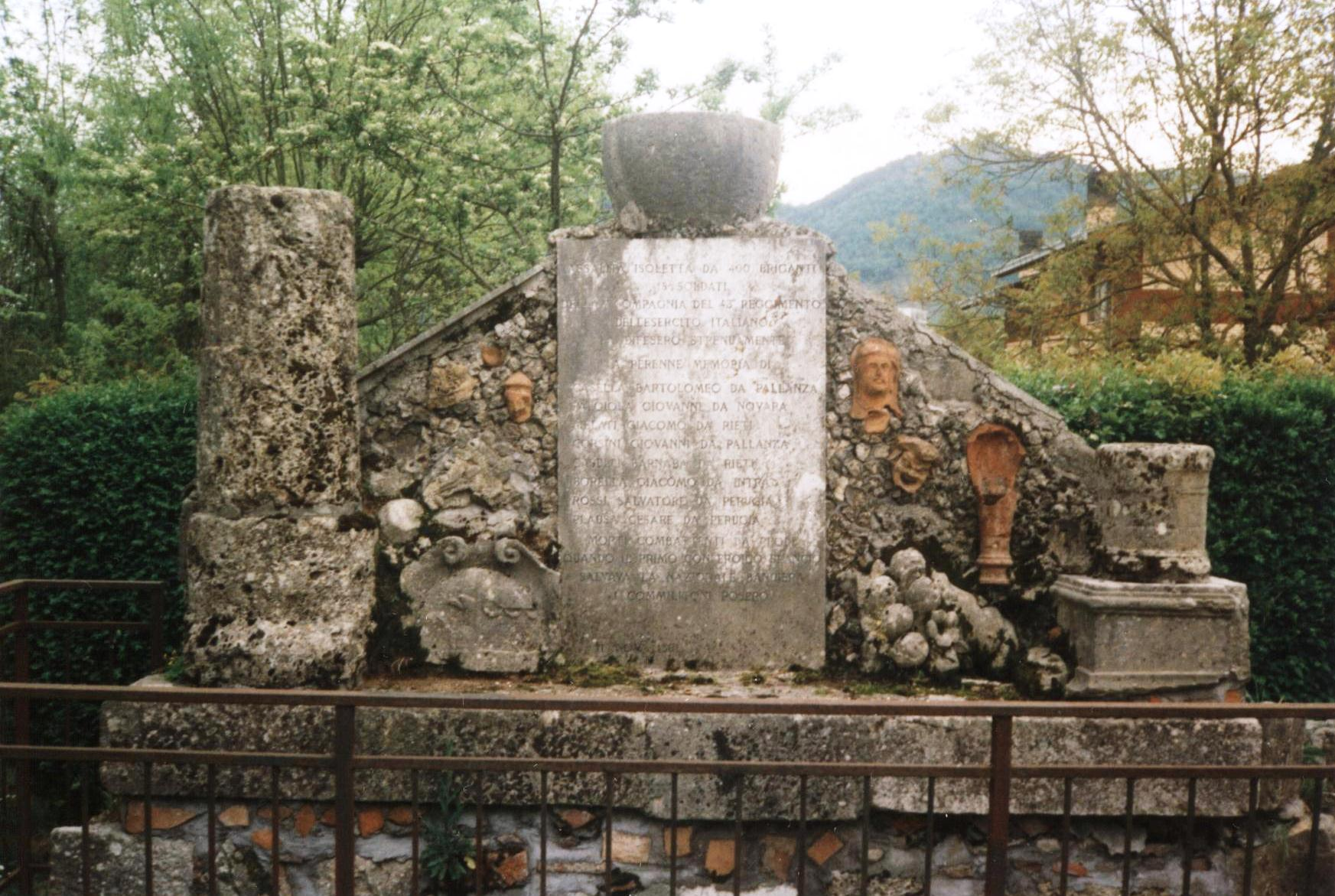
Memorial in Isoletta

Since ancient times, the town has been occupied by Italian people. The Aurunci were the first to occupy the town. They were then followed by the Volsci. Isoletta is known for the Roman ruins of Fregellae.

In the Middle Ages, Isoletta was known as "Insula" (Isola) and "Insula Pontis Solarati". (Isola del Ponte Solarato), The first fortification dates back to 702, when the Lombards of Benevento made settlement in order to use the land as a garrison for their raids in the Liri Valley (Arpino, Sora).

In 1046, the town was incorporated by Richard I in the heritage of the counts of Aquino. The counts of Ceccano and the Abbey of Montecassino also had lands. In 1139, Pope Innocent II declared war against the King Roger I of Sicily, and his troops destroyed Isoletta during an invasion of southern Italy.

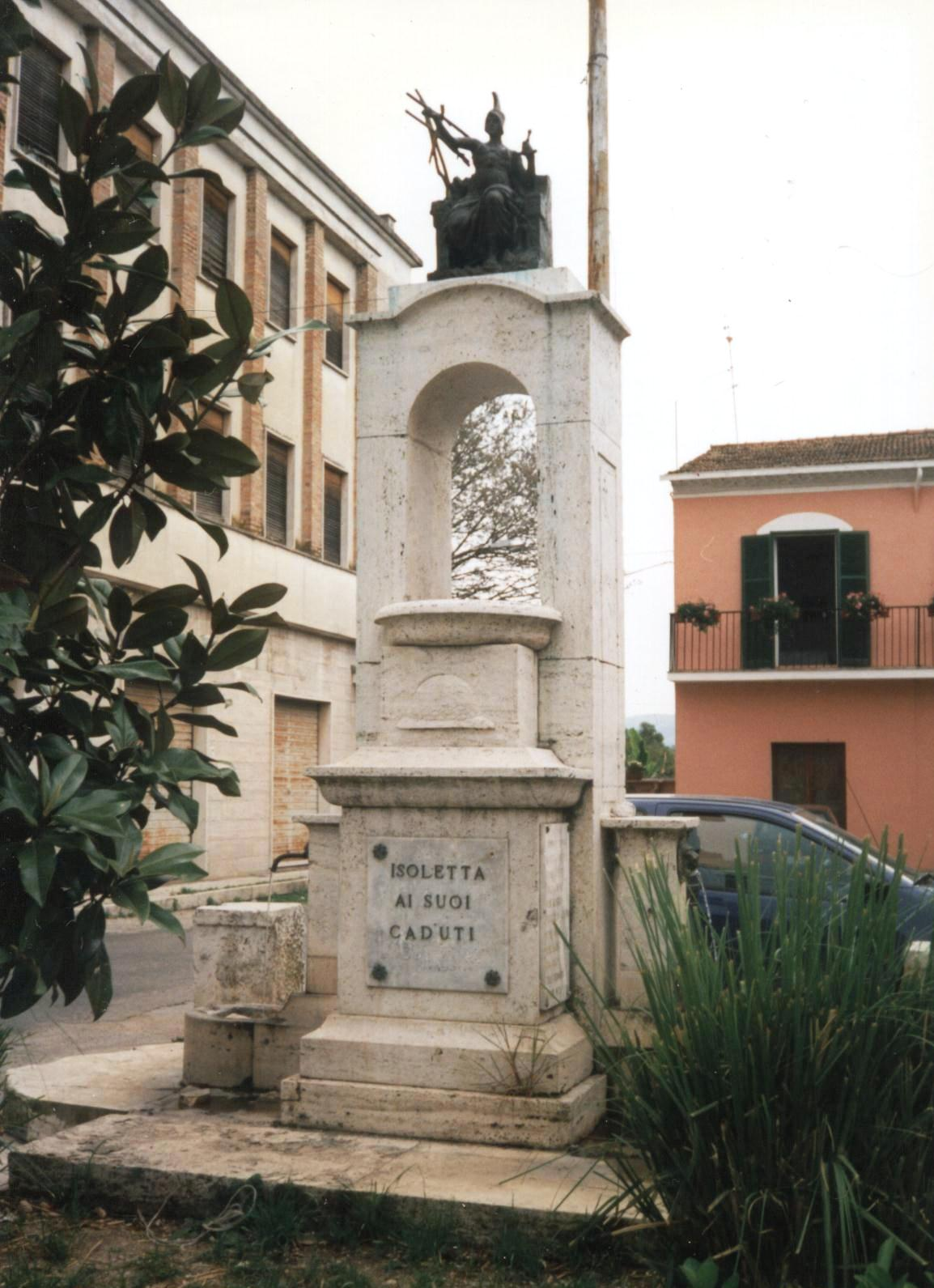
World War Memorial of Isoletta

Due to family relationships between Aquinos and Celanos, the village became entered into Celanos' possession. This occurred during a period in which the natives of Abruzzo were at the peak of their political and economic prestige. Thomas of Celano, head of the army of the Chiavesignati during the War of the Keys, organized and financed the construction of the first castle. From there, with Ruggieri dell'Aquila, he organized the siege of Arce. The Chiavesignati, having been defeated in Abruzzo, the Celanos were forced to give away all their conquests and properties beyond Marsica (Molise, Valle Latina) including Isoletta, which then became a possession of a local family, the Spinellos.

When Leonardo Della Rovere became Duke of Sora in 1465, he obtained Sora, Arce, and Isoletta as concessions. He extended the old military structure and built a real castle. For a short time, the area was under the administration of William de Croÿ, before moving to Boncompagni in 1579. After the reintegration of the Duchy of Sora in the Papal States, the Bourbons transformed the castle into a border fortress. During the unification of Italy the castle became a private property and was thereafter destroyed during the fascist period to make way for a private home.

In 1944, Isoletta was the setting of marocchinate, where Moroccans of the French Army raped and killed, primarily women. Norman Lewis, a British officer in the Battle of Monte Cassino at the time, recounted the events in a book he wrote:

"The French colonial troops are on the rampage again. Whenever they take a village or a town, a wholesale rape of the population takes place. Recently all females in the villages of Patricia, Pofi, Isoletta, Supino, and Morolo, were violated. [...] children and even old men were violated. It is reported to be normal for two Moroccans to assault a woman simultaneously, one having normal intercourse, while the other commits sodomy. In many cases severe damages to the genitals, rectum and uterus has been caused." - Norman Lewis, Naples '44: A World War II Diary of Occupied Italy

The patron saint is Santa Maria della Vittoria. For years, she was celebrated on the first Sunday of October; however, as of the early 2000s the day is now celebrated on the last Sunday of August.

== Archaeology ==
Isoletta is an important historical center, where the remains of ancient civilizations can still be seen. The Ruins of the Roman Empire in the Fregellae archaeological complex is a center of considerable importance for the entire Bourbon period. It is located on the border between the Papal States and the Kingdom of Naples, which further signifies its importance.

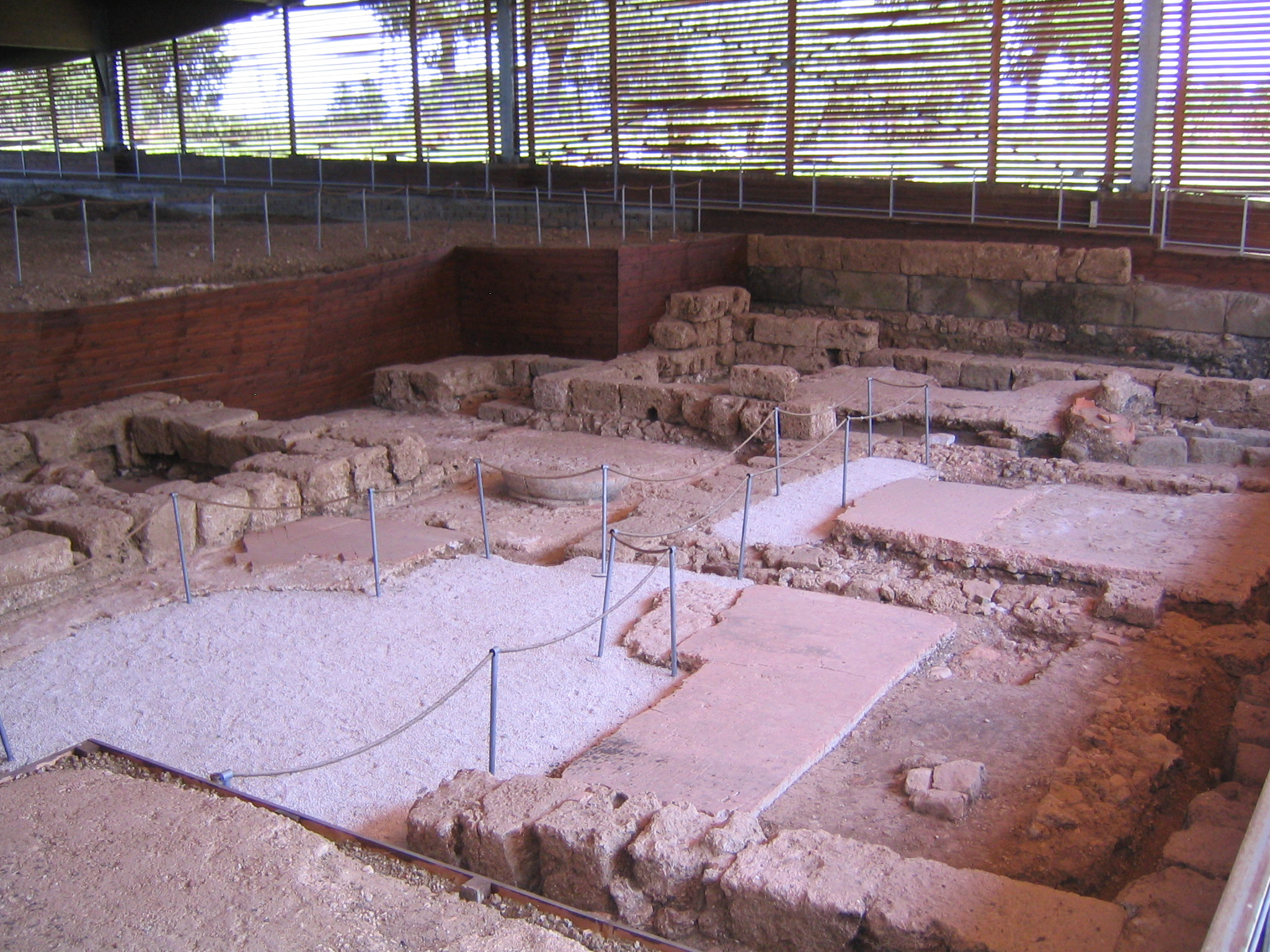
Fregellae, Roman baths

Inhabited since ancient times, archaeologists have discovered everything from prehistoric remains, pre-Roman, Roman ruins (Fregellae), medieval, and Bourbon. In the nearby Pofi Museum, the head of an elephant and the remains of objects of ancient civilizations are displayed. The confluence of Liri and Sacco rivers and its strategic location remains paramount toward the recognition of Isoletta.

== Isoletta Castle ==
The Castle of the Sessile Oak of Isoletta, or Castle of the Counts of Celano (Castello Della Rovere di Isoletta or Castello dei Conti di Celano) was a former military fortification. Now destroyed, it is placed in "the defensive system of the high" Terra di Lavoro with the Boncompagni-Viscogliosi of Isola del Liri, Rocca Campolato of Rocca d'Arce, and Arce castles. Still today, the bridge over the Liri River nearby the castle is held in high regard by its native people.

== Notable people ==
- Joseph A. Trillo, American politician from Rhode Island

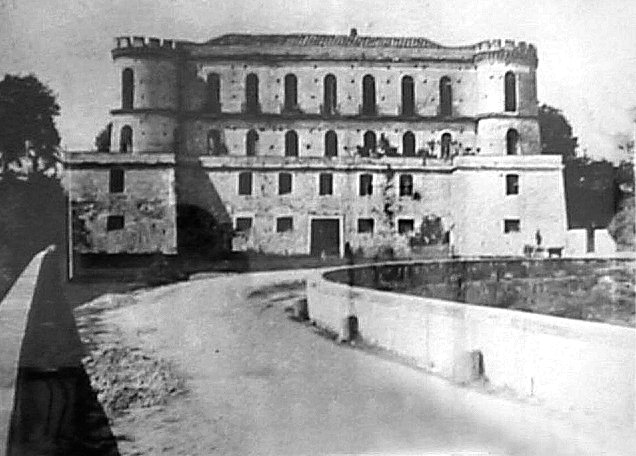
Castle of Isoletta

== See also ==
- San Giovanni Incarico
- Fregellae
- Arce, Lazio
- Ceprano
