= Cereatae Marianae =

Roman town and birthplace of Gaius Marius

Cereatae, later distinguished as Cereatae Marianae, was a Roman-era municipium located in the region of Latium adiectum, in central Italy. It is chiefly known as the ancestral home of the Roman general Gaius Marius, from whom it derives its distinguishing epithet Marianae.

== Etymology and location ==
The name Cereatae is believed to be connected to a sanctuary or cult center dedicated to the goddess Ceres, suggesting agricultural or religious significance in antiquity. This interpretation is supported by the persistence of the toponym in nearby locations and by the prevalence of agrarian cults in the region during the Roman Republican period. The addition Marianae refers to Gaius Marius, who was born there, at a time when Cereatae was part of the territory of Arpinum. It later became a separate municipium, perhaps due to the influence of Marius, some of whose family and dependents settled there.

According to Strabo, Cereatae was situated on the left side of the Via Latina, between Anagnia and Sora. The thirteenth century Cistercian monastery of Casamari, three miles west of the Liris between Verulae and Arpinum, is probably built on the site of Cereatae. An inscription referring to the inhabitants of Cereatae, the Cereatini Mariani, mentioned by Pliny the Elder, was discovered at the monastery, the name of which seems to allude to Marius. Today this places it within the modern comune of Veroli in the Province of Frosinone, part of Lazio.

== History and archaeology ==
Cereatae is known primarily for Gaius Marius, a Roman general and seven-time consul, who was born there about 157 BC. Marius was one of the most prominent figures of the late Republic, playing a significant role in the events of the late second and early first century BC. Later, during the reign of Augustus, a group of colonists were sent to Cereatae by Drusus, the emperor's stepson.

Archaeology in the area of Casamari has revealed signs of habitation, including the remains of buildings, Roman roads, and Latin inscriptions, some of which were incorporated into later structures. A Benedictine monastery was raised there in the ninth century, replaced by the Cistercian abbey at the beginning of the thirteenth century.

== Bibliography ==
=== Ancient sources ===
- Strabo, Geographica.
- Gaius Plinius Secundus (Pliny the Elder), Historia Naturalis (Natural History).
- Lucius Mestrius Plutarchus (Plutarch), Lives of the Noble Greeks and Romans (Parallel Lives).

=== Modern sources ===
- William Smith, ed., Dictionary of Greek and Roman Geography, Little, Brown and Company, Boston (1854).
- Thomas Ashby, The Classical Topography of the Roman Campagna, Clarendon Press, Oxford (1910).
- Richard Talbert, ed., Barrington Atlas of the Greek and Roman World, Princeton University Press, Princeton, New Jersey (2000).
