= Hannibal's March on Rome =

211 BC military movement

- Part of the Second Punic War
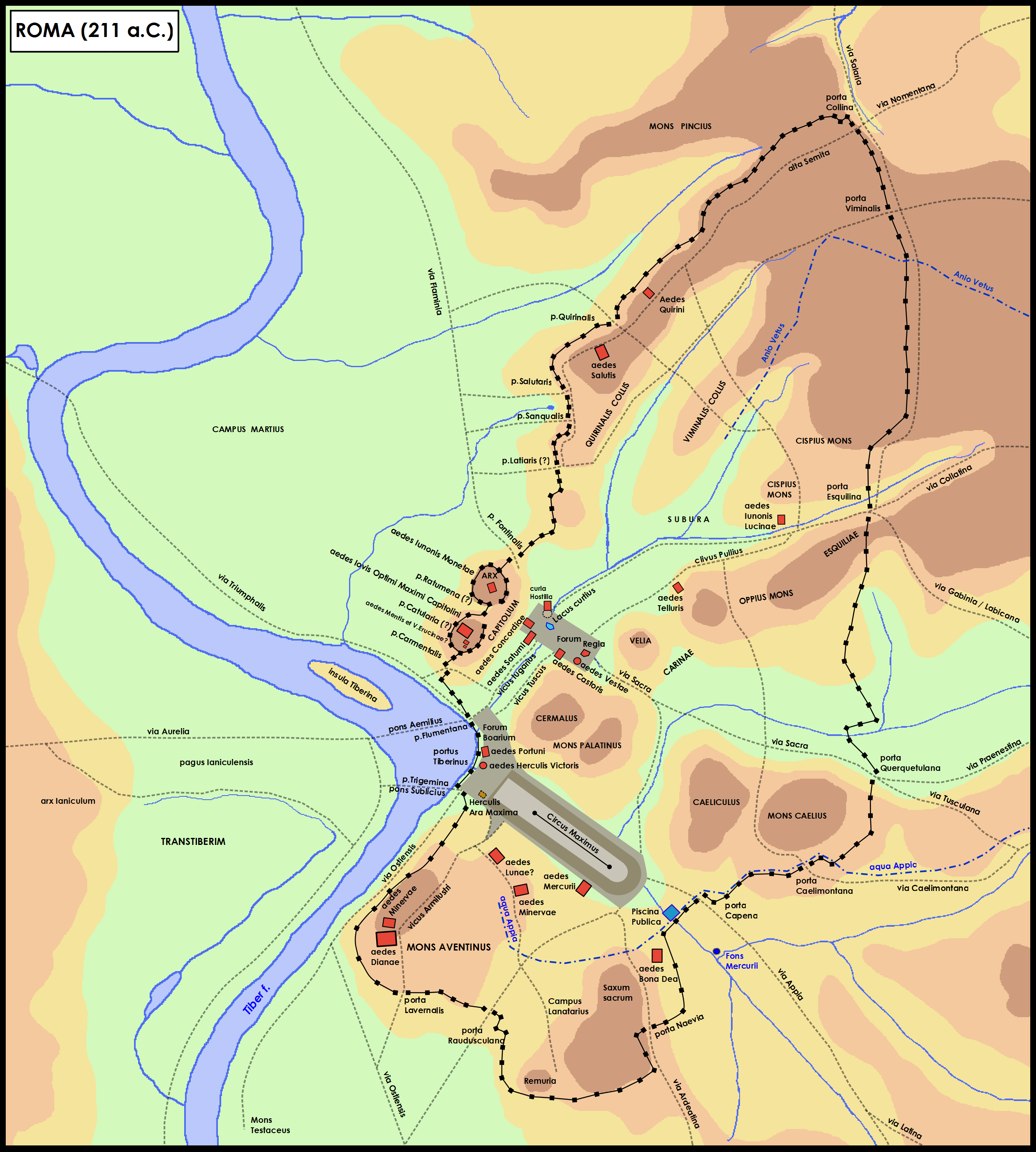
- Rome at the time of Hannibal's incursion (211 BC), with its main monuments
Date	211 BC
Location	Rome, Italy
Result	Carthaginian failure

Belligerents
Roman Republic	Carthage

Commanders and leaders
Fulvius Flaccus	Hannibal

Hannibal's March on Rome occurred in 211 BC during the Second Punic War; the Carthaginian leader Hannibal marched by surprise with his army towards Rome, initially causing great concern among the leaders and citizens of the republic. The raid, however, ended in failure; soon, faced with firm resistance from the Romans, Hannibal left the city to head with his troops to Campania.

== Prelude ==
After the winter of 212/211 BC, Hannibal returned to Capua, effectively besieging the Roman besiegers, commanded by proconsul Appius Claudius Pulcer (consul 212 BC). Unable to induce the Roman commander to prepare for battle, first of all he tried to constantly annoy him, sending squadrons of cavalry against the Romans to launch their javelins inside the Roman camp, while infantry units tried to tear down the external palisade. Despite this new attempt, the Romans remained firm in their decision. Hannibal, dissatisfied with the stalemate that had thus arisen, was unable to penetrate the walls of the city, his allies Capua, not even to provoke the Romans to battle; also feared that in that position he might find himself trapped by the arrival of the new consuls, who would thus cut him off outside the necessary supplies.

== Hannibal decides to go to Rome ==
The solution he devised was to march quickly and unexpectedly against Rome itself, causing such fear in the inhabitants as to induce Appius Claudius to either lift the siege and rush to the aid of his homeland, or divide his army—in which case both the forces sent to Rome to help and those left in Capua would have been easily beatable.

Having made these reflections, he sent a Libyan courier to Capua, whom he had forced to desert in order to pass into the Roman camp and from there reach the city, closed by the siege and therefore inaccessible for the Carthaginians. In fact, he feared that the inhabitants of Capua would believe they had been abandoned, agreeing to surrender.

Having captured the boats that were on the Volturno river, Hannibal ordered his army to push towards the fort that he had built to defend the place. When he learned that the boats were so numerous, that the army could cross the river in a single night, after only five days from its arrival in Capua, he had his men dine; having prepared food for ten days, left the fires lit, he broke camp so that no one would notice what was happening; he then led his troops to the river during the night and crossed it before dawn.

== Hannibal's March ==
The Carthaginian leader had to set out for the Via Latina. On the day he passed the Volturno, he set up camp not far from the river. The next day he arrived in the territory of the Sidicini, which was beyond the city of Cales . Here he stopped for a day to plunder and make provisions for the marching army. He then led his men along the Via Latina, passing through Suessa Aurunca , Allifae and Casinum . Near this city he set up camp for two days and plundered the surrounding territories. Going beyond Interamna Lirenas and Aquinum, he reached the agro Fregellano along the river Liri. Here he was forced to slow down his march because the Fregellans had cut the bridge. After having plundered the countryside around Fregellae to take revenge for the destruction of the bridge, he passed through the territory first of Frusinum, then of Ferentinum and Anagnia, reaching Labicum. From here he passed through Monte Algido and headed to Tusculum , but here too he was not welcomed. Then he made a detour and headed for Gabii , then passed through the region Pupinia and set up camp eight miles from Rome (though according to Polybius, his camp was no more than a stadium from the city).

== Roman Reactions ==
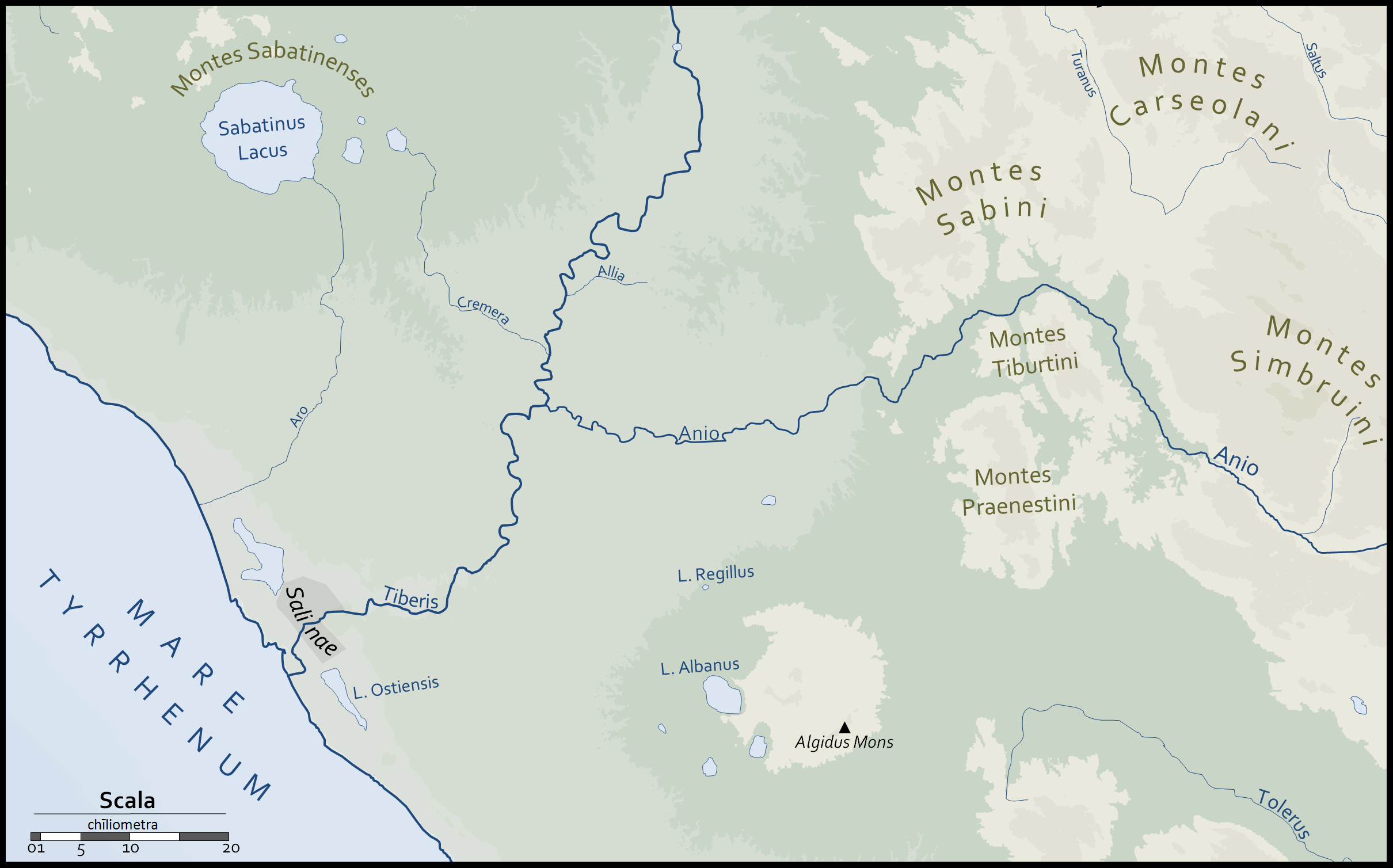
Carte vierge du Latium Vetus

Quintus Fulvius Flaccus, as soon as he learned from the deserters what Hannibal was about to do, immediately wrote to the Roman Senate. The senators were impressed and moved. And as happened during every such critical situation, the general assembly was called. Someone, like Publius Cornelius Scipio Asina, proposed to recall all the commanders and armies from Italy to defend Rome, thus neglecting the siege of Capua. Others, however, like Quintus Fabius Maximus Verrucosus, considered it shameful to abandon Capua, giving in to fear and thus allowing himself to be controlled by Hannibal's movements.

Among these opposing opinions, the more balanced opinion of Publius Valerius Flaccus prevailed, who, having listened to the opposing opinions, proposed to write to the commanders who were besieging Capua, informing them about the forces garrisoning Rome; they in turn could know how many soldiers Hannibal would bring with him and how many would be needed to besiege Capua. In this case they would have decided which commander to send to Rome, between Appius Claudius Pulcher and Quintus Fulvius Flaccus (consul 237 BC), and with what forces to defend the homeland from the assault of the Carthaginian army.

Thus it was that Fulvius Flaccus chose to go to Rome himself, since his colleague Appius was injured. He then chose 15,000 infantry from the three armies at his disposal and 1,000 cavalry and crossed the Volturno. As he learned that Hannibal would travel the Via Latina, he chose the Via Appia, sending messengers to those municipalities along the road, such as Setia, Cora and Lavinium, so that they could prepare the necessary supplies to be carried along the road when the Roman army passed. He therefore ordered the garrisons to be concentrated in the cities, ready to defend themselves.

Meanwhile, a messenger who had been sent by Fregellae to announce Hannibal's march on Rome when he reached the city, generated a profound disturbance among the population and an immense fear, because it was so sudden and unexpected, considering that never before had the Carthaginian leader come so close to the city. There was also suspicion on the part of the inhabitants of Rome that the legions had been destroyed in Capua. Garrisons were placed on the Arx and on the Capitol, around the city and even on Monte Albano and on the fortress of Aefula. Then finally the happy news arrived that the proconsul Fulvius Flaccus had also left Capua by forced marches and was reaching Rome to defend it. The Senate then decreed that the authority of his command was equal to that of the consuls, so that the maximum military power would not be taken away from him.

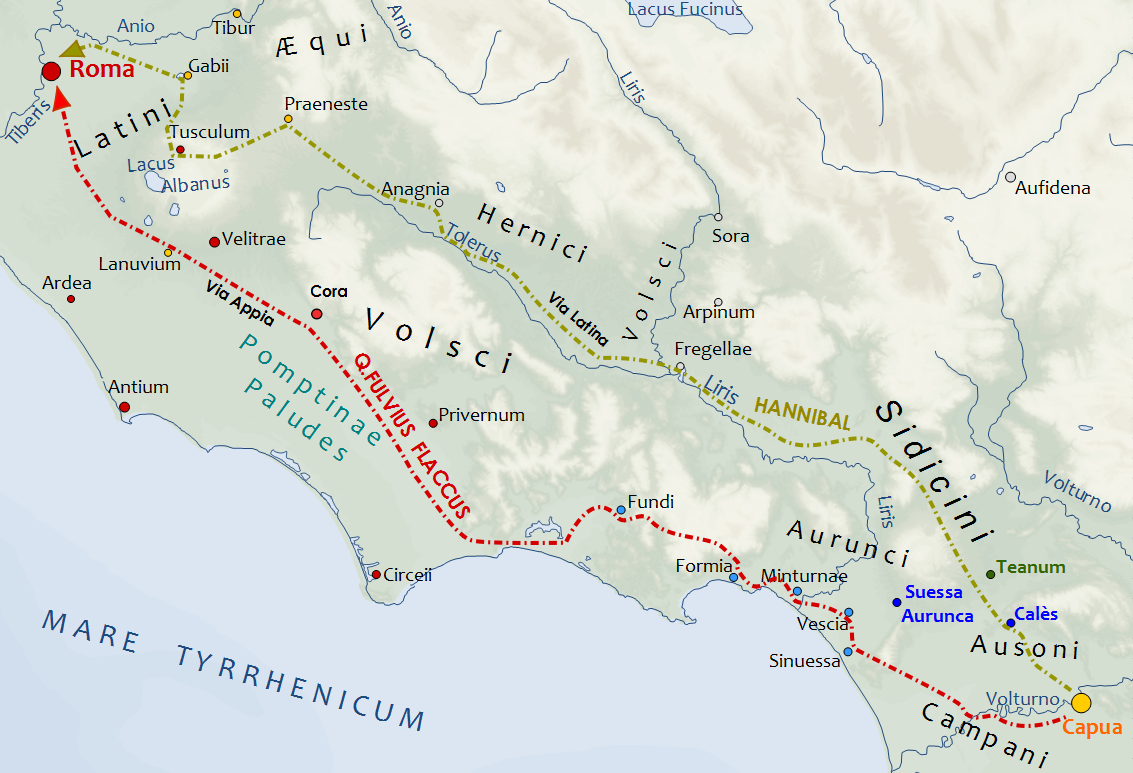
March of Hannibal on Rome and the proconsul Fulvius Flaccus

And while Hannibal was approaching Rome, Fulvius Flaccus, after being initially held back by the river Volturno, since the Carthaginian leader had previously set fire to the boats to ferry the army there, managed to build rafts to pass through with the little wood found in the area north of the river. From here the march was quite easy, as many of the cities encountered along the way made the necessary supplies available to the Roman commander to speed up his march. Flaccus then entered Rome from the Porta Capena and passed through the middle of the city through the neighborhood of the Carinae and then heading to the Esquiline. From this mons he left the Roman walls and set up camp between the Porta Esquilina and the Porta Collina, in the north-eastern part of Rome. The aediles of the plebs had supplies brought in, while the consuls decided to place their camps, one near the Porta Collina and the other near the Porta Esquilina. The urban praetor, Gaius Calpurnius Piso (praetor 211 BC), was entrusted with the task of defending the Capitoline Hill and the arx, while the senators would remain at the Roman Forum, ready to be consulted in case of need.

== The Raid ==
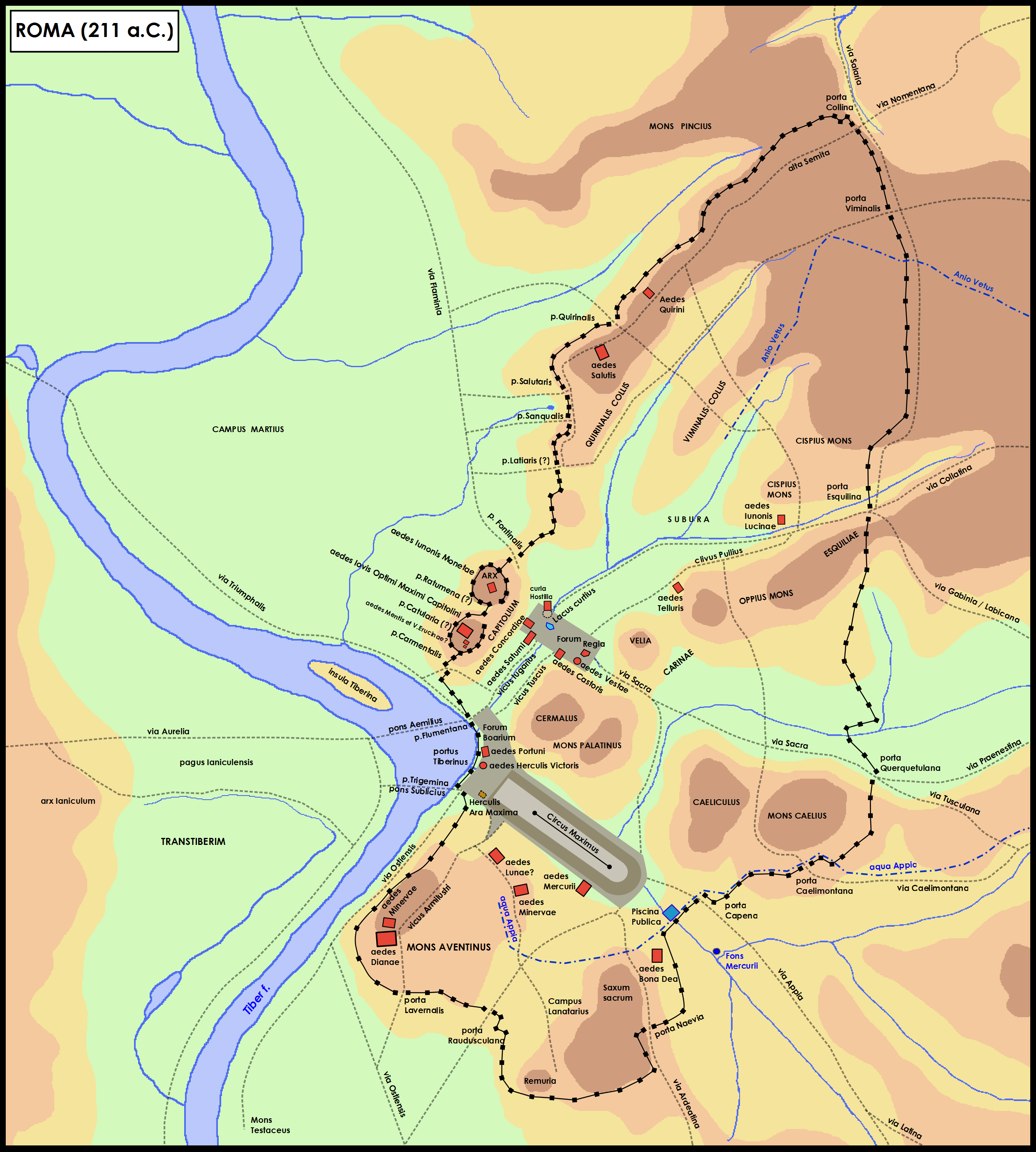
Defense of the city of Rome

The next step was for Hannibal to move the camp towards the Aniene river, just three miles from Rome. Having placed the new camp here, he moved with 2,000 knights towards the Collina gate and arrived near the temple of Hercules, to observe the city and its defensive works as closely as possible. The Roman reaction on the part of Fulvius Flaccus was to send a contingent of cavalry against the Carthaginian commander, to drive him back to his camps. The consuls, once the equestrian battle had broken out, they ordered 500 Numidian deserters, who were on the Aventine Hill, to cross the city and move to the Esquiline, ready to intervene in the fight. But when some citizens saw this foreign contingent rush down from the Capitoline Hill and then walk up the Publicia slope, they began to shout that the Aventine had been taken by the enemy, generating great fear and confusion among the population.

And when Hannibal decided to storm the Servian Walls of the city of Rome, an accidental event interrupted his plan. The consuls of that year (211 BC), Gnaeus Fulvius Centumalus Maximus and Publius Sulpicius Galba Maximus, had in fact recently completed the enlistment of a legion, engaging the soldiers to present themselves in Rome in arms for the oath, and that very same day they were intent on enlisting a second one. This fortuitous event had brought together a large multitude of soldiers in the city, just at the moment when it was needed. The consuls with great courage led them outside, in front of the city walls, curbing the ardor of the Carthaginian army. Although Hannibal initially did not despair of taking the city, once he saw the enemies positioning themselves in battle order, he preferred to give up the plan to attack it, instead starting raids through the surrounding region, looting and setting fires everywhere. The Carthaginians thus collected a large quantity of booty in their camp, since no one dared to oppose them.

Livy recounts that the day after the first clash, the equestrian one, between the two armies, Hannibal crossed the Aniene and placed his ranks in battle order. Flaccus and the consuls did not shrink from fighting. The armies thus found themselves lined up, one in front of the other, but a very heavy rain, mixed with hail, forced the soldiers to retreat to their camps, due to the fear caused by the event. The following day, a similar event once again dispersed the ranks ready for battle.

Hannibal was shaken by these events, in addition to the fact that he had been informed that a Roman army of reinforcements had left for Spain, therefore regardless of the siege of the Carthaginian leader, and that the field in which he had placed the Carthaginian camp had been sold without the price decreasing at all, he withdrew his army to the river Tuzia, six miles from Rome.

Later, when the consuls dared to camp just 10 stadia away (1.85 km) from the Carthaginian enemy, at dawn, Hannibal led the army out to return to Capua, both because he had collected sufficient booty and because he considered it impossible to besiege the city, but above all because he believed that his plan had had the desired effect now that a sufficient number of days had passed, forcing the proconsul Appius Claudius, to lift the siege of the Campania city and rush to save the homeland, or to divide the army to keep Capua under siege and at the same time return to Rome. Both solutions would have been to the liking of the Carthaginian leader.

== Result ==
The return route of the Carthaginian leader illustrated by Livy seems to have passed through the following locations: Eretum, the temple of the goddess Feronia, Reate, Cutilia and Amiternum. Hannibal, who had initially ordered to march at a good pace, when he learned that Appius Claudius had not lifted the siege of Capua, he decided to wait for Publius Sulpicius, who was pursuing him, and at night he attacked the enemy camp. The ensuing battle saw a new Roman defeat: many Roman soldiers were killed, while the remainder saved themselves, taking refuge on a safe hill, and thus making the Carthaginian commander desist from carrying out a new attack against them.

Hannibal, from Campania, seems to have continued to Sannio and then to the country of the Peligni. He then passed under the walls of the city of Sulmona, heading towards the town of the Marrucini, on to the Alba Fucens of the Marsi, up to the village of Foruli (Civitatomassa, hamlet of Scoppito). He thereafter decided to continue his march towards Daunia (the northern part of Apulia) and the Bruzio, to reach Reggio Calabria in such a sudden way that he almost took the city, still faithful to Rome.
