= Caietae Portus =

Caietae Portus (mod. Gaeta) was an ancient Roman harbour of Latium adiectum, Italy, in the territory of Formiae.

The name (originally Αἰήτη) was derived from Caieta, the nurse of Aeneas.

The harbour, owing to its fine anchorage, was much in use, but the place was never a separate town, but always dependent on Formiae. Livy mentioned a temple of Apollo. The coast of the Gulf not only between Caietae Portus and Formiae, but east of the latter also, as far as the modern Monte Scauri, was a favourite summer resort.

Cicero may have had villas both at Portus Caietae and at Formiae proper, and the emperors certainly possessed property at both places. After the destruction of Formiae in 847 it became one of the most important seaports of central Italy. In the town are scanty remains of an amphitheatre and theatre: near the church of La Trinità, higher up, are remains of a large reservoir. There are also traces of an aqueduct.

The promontory, at 548 ft (167 m), is crowned by the tomb of Munatius Plancus, founder of Lugudunum (modern Lyons), who died after 22 BC. It is a circular structure of blocks of travertine 160 ft (49 m) high and 180 ft (55 m) in diameter. Further inland is the so-called tomb of L Atratinus, about 100 feet (30 m) in diameter. Caieta Portus was no doubt connected with the Via Appia (which passed through Formiae) by a deverticulum. There seems also to have been a road running west-north-west along the precipitous coast to Speluncae (mod. Sperlonga).
