= March on Rome (disambiguation) =

The phrase March on Rome can refer to several historical events:

- March on Rome, a coup of Mussolini in 1922 that enabled the establishment of fascism in Italy.
- Hannibal's March on Rome, Hannibal failed attempt to raid Rome in 211 BC, during the Second Punic War.
- March on Rome (88 BC), a coup of the consul Lucius Cornelius Sulla during the Roman Republic.
- An event of the Bellum Octavianum in 87 BC, when the consul Lucius Cornelius Cinna marched on Rome.
- An event of Caesar's civil war in 49 BC, when Julius Caesar crossed the Rubicon and marched on Rome.
