= Valle del Liri =

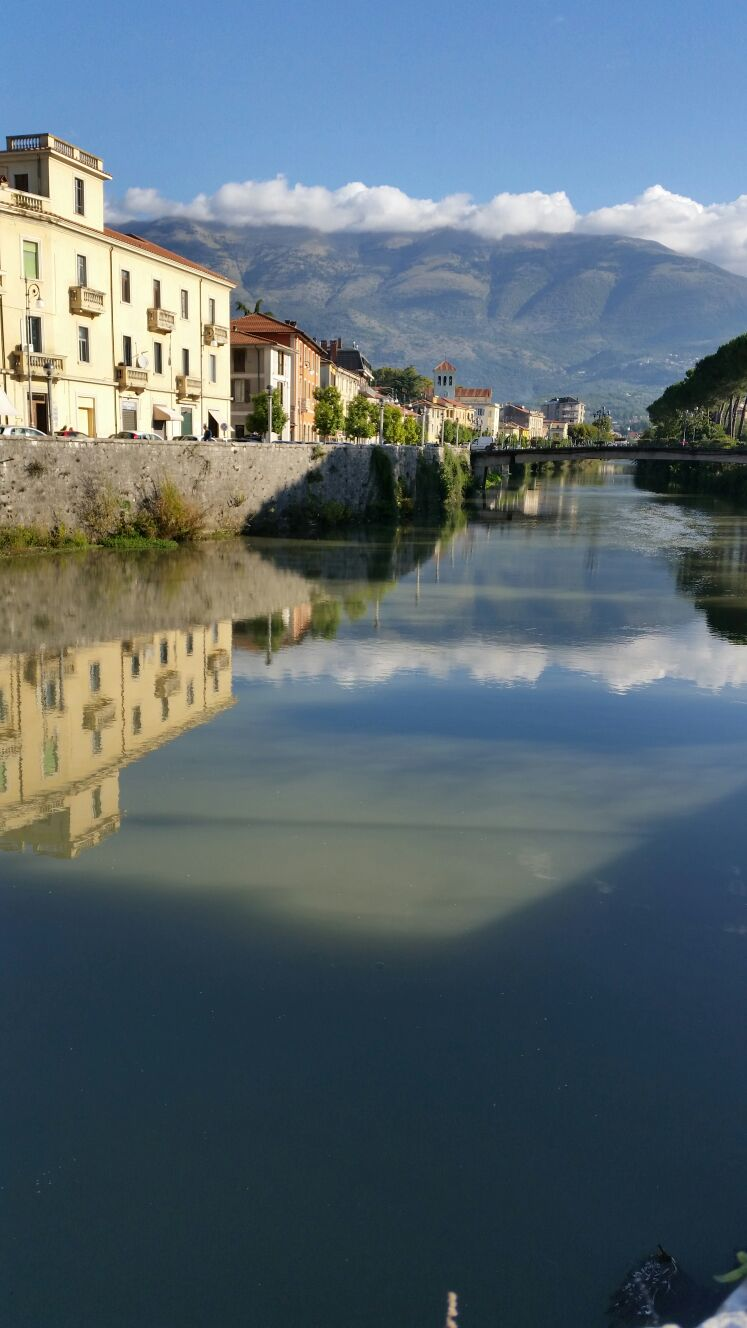
Sora and the Liri river

The Valle del Liri (Liri valley) is a valley and a geographical region of southern Lazio and part of the larger Latin Valley, located in the province of Frosinone, crossed by the Liri river (as well as the Valle Roveto in Abruzzo, which is included in its territory and beyond which it continues into the Lazio region). The main urban center of the area is Sora.

== History ==
Before the Roman conquest and the Latin colonization, the valley was inhabited, by the Volsci, of Indo-European origin, but unlike the Latins, belonging to the Osco-Umbrian family and therefore culturally closer to the other Italic populations of Apennine Italy. The territory of the Samnites (also Osco-Umbrians) extended to the south. Following the Roman expansion in Lazio, the Liri River initially became the border between the territory under the control of Rome and the Samnite one. In the valley there were several important centers, in particular Fregellae, Sora and Arpino. The first two, Latin colonies, were therefore populated with thousands of Latin and / or Roman colonists. After the fall of the Roman Empire the territory became, after the Gothic and Byzantine period, again a border territory between the Byzantine (later papal) domains and the different southern duchies and kingdoms. The main local lordships, which in any case orbited Naples, were the county, (later duchy) of Sora and the Terra Sancti Benedicti, the latter feudal domain of the Montecassino abbey. In 1870 the two banks of the Liri rediscovered their ancient unity, albeit within two different provinces. In 1927 with the creation of the province of Frosinone, the region south of the Liri also became part of Lazio.

== Economy ==
For centuries, since ancient times, the territory was characterized by the processing of wool. In contemporary times, particularly from the nineteenth century, the Valley was dotted with important paper production centers.
