= Anitrella =

Coordinates: 41°38′22″N 13°32′58″E

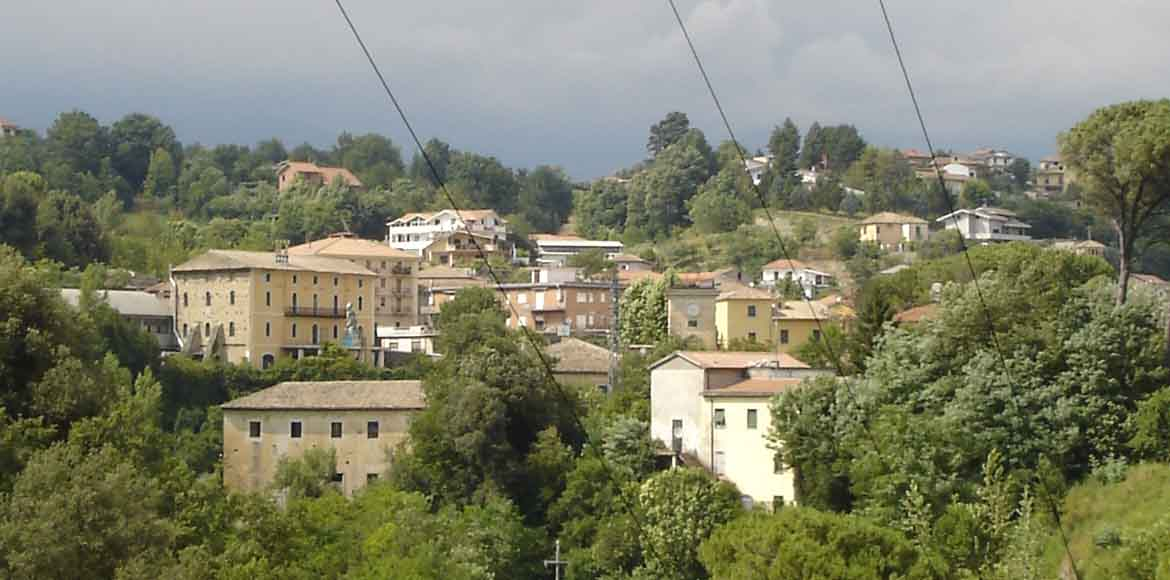
Anitrella

Anitrella is a frazione, or territorial subdivision of a comune, of the Italian comune (municipality) of Monte San Giovanni Campano.

There was an important paper mill built by the counts Lucernari and ruled by the Ligurian family Piccardo.
