= Valle Latina =

Italian geographical and historical region

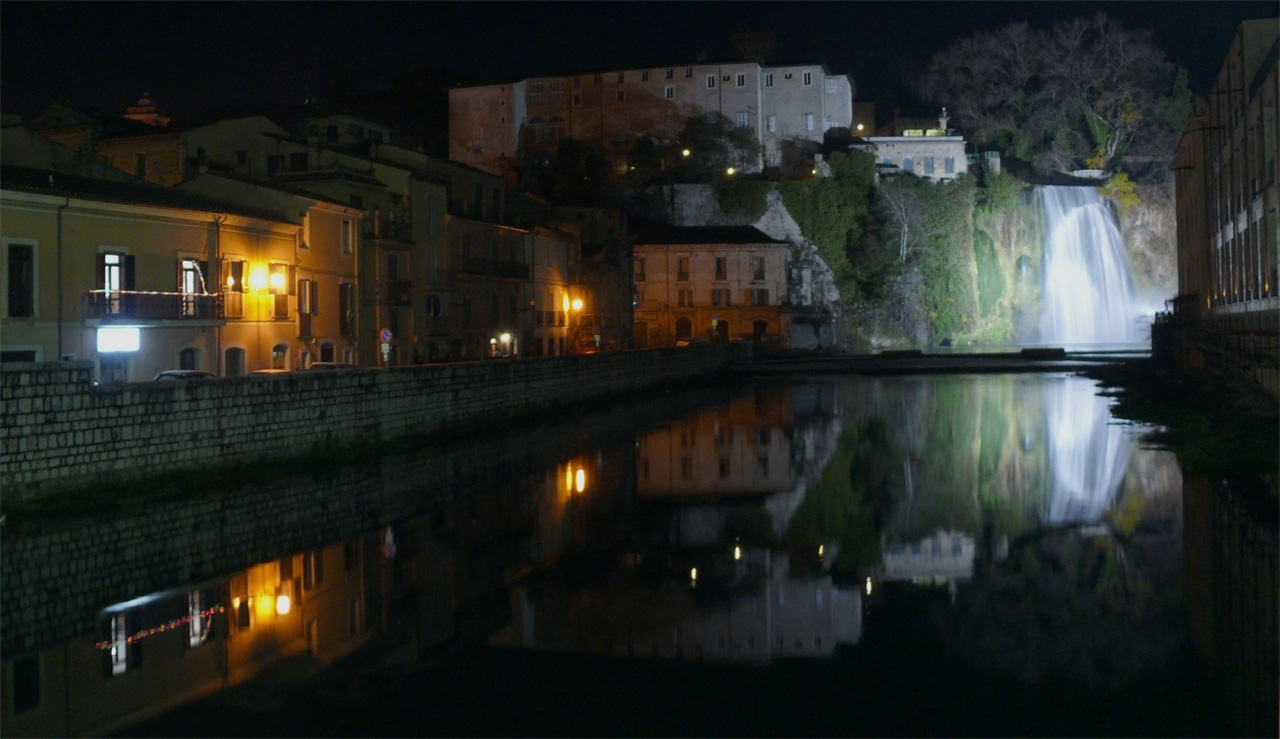
- Isola del Liri's waterfall in the evening

Geography
- Location: Province of Frosinone, Lazio, Italy
- Rivers: Liri; Sacco
- Interactive map of Valle Latina

Valle Latina (English: "Latin Valley") is an Italian geographical and historical region that extends from the south of Rome to Cassino, corresponding to the eastern area of ancient Roman Latium.

The valley's principal cities are Frosinone, Cassino, Sora, Grottaferrata, Anagni, and Alatri.

== History ==
=== Ancient ===
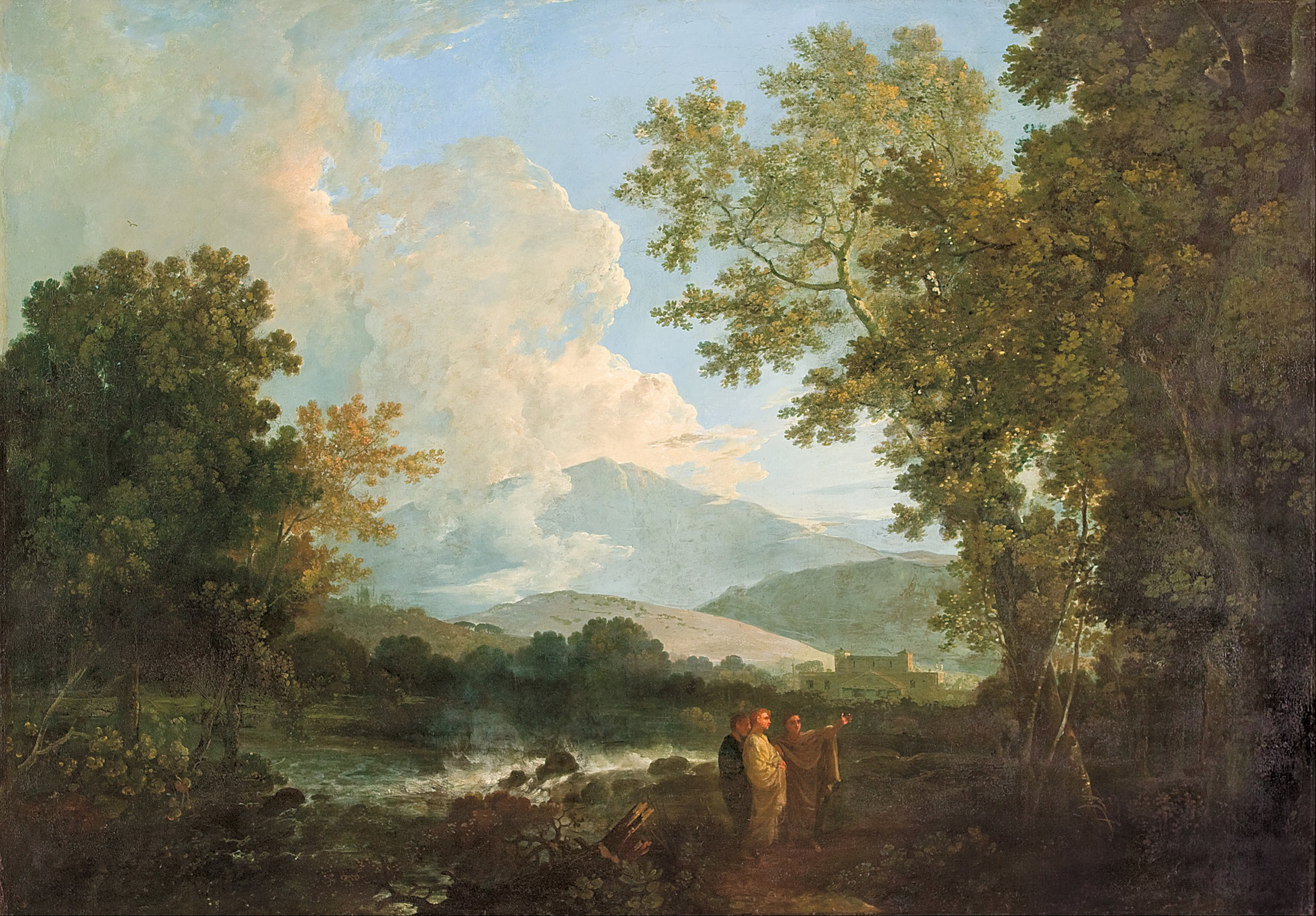
Cicero with his friend Atticus and brother Quintus, at his villa at Arpinum by Richard Wilson, 1770

According to the tradition, in 496 BC the Romans defeated their Latin rivals in the Battle of Lake Regillus and imposed their dominion over the Latium vetus, corresponding in part to the northern area of the current Latin Valley. In the following centuries, the center and south of the Valley was the heart of Latin colonization in Roman times. Unlike the coastal areas where small Roman colonies were founded, the inland areas saw the creation of diverse and densely populated Latin colonies. The Latins and Romans mixed with the pre-existing Osco-Umbrian-speaking populations, in particular the Hernici, with their capital Anagni, and the Volsci in Frosinone and in the Liri Valley. Further south, the Oscan city of Casinum (Cassino) had been conquered by Volsci, Samnites and finally Romans. Within its territory (ager casinas) the Romans founded the colony of Interamna Lirenas. Other important Latin colonies in the region were Sora and Fregellae. The Latin-Roman colonization coincided with the creation of the Latium adiectum and the Via Latina. The Via Latina started from Porta Capena in Rome, passing through the Porta Latina, then continued south-east, crossing the Alban Hills (High Valle Latina), the Valle del Sacco (Middle Valle Latina) and the Valle del Liri up to Cassino (Lower Latin Valley), the last city of the Latins and the current Latin Valley, to then enter Campania and end in Capua. With the territorial reorganization of Italy under Augustus, the area was incorporated into the Regio I Latium et Campania, a territorial institution that would remain in force until the fall of the Western Roman Empire in 476 AD.

=== Middle Ages and Modern era ===
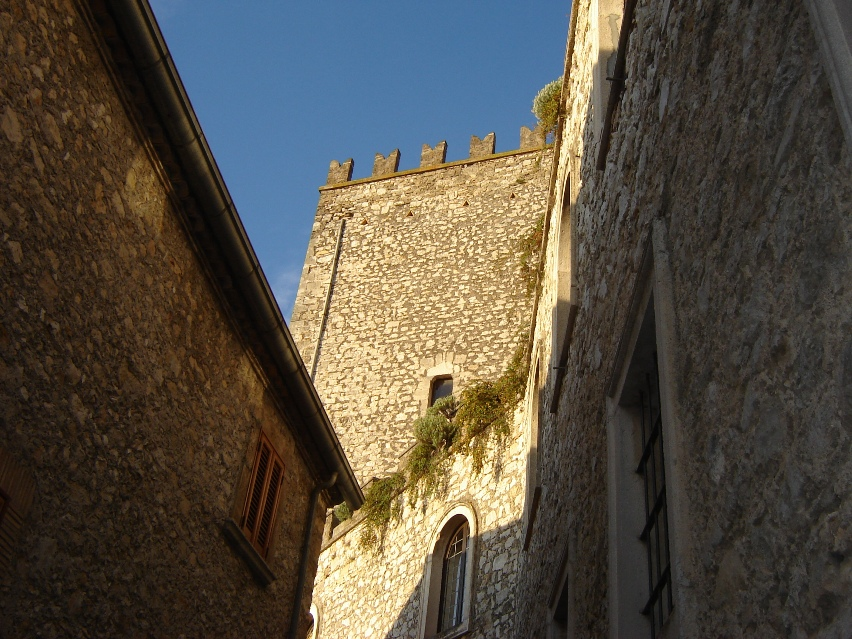
Monte San Giovanni Campano's castle

At the end of the 5th century the Valley, along with the rest of the Peninsula, became part of the Ostrogothic Kingdom. Around the year 529, St. Benedict of Norcia founded the Abbey of Monte Cassino on the summit of Montecassino, on the southern edge of the Latin Valley, which represented a point of reference for the Christian identity of Western Europe. A few years later, in 535, the Greek-Gothic war broke out and ended in 553 with the Byzantine victory. With the subsequent Lombard invasion, the political unity of the Latin Valley was compromised: the Lower Latin Valley was incorporated into the Lombard Duchy of Benevento, to then follow the history of southern Italy, while the Upper and Middle Valle remained in the Roman Duchy and therefore the subsequent Church State. Anyway, in the southern area of the Latin Valley, autonomous feudal territories were formed that were able to shape their own and separate identity. Particular attention should therefore be paid, in this regard, to the Terra Sancti Benedicti and the Duchy of Sora. The hopes of municipal autonomy of the main cities of the Middle Latin Valley, including for example Ferentino and Alatri, as well as others in the neighboring regions, but in any case subject to papal authority, pushed pope Innocent III to establish the Province of Campagna e Marittima in the XII century.

== Cultural heritage ==
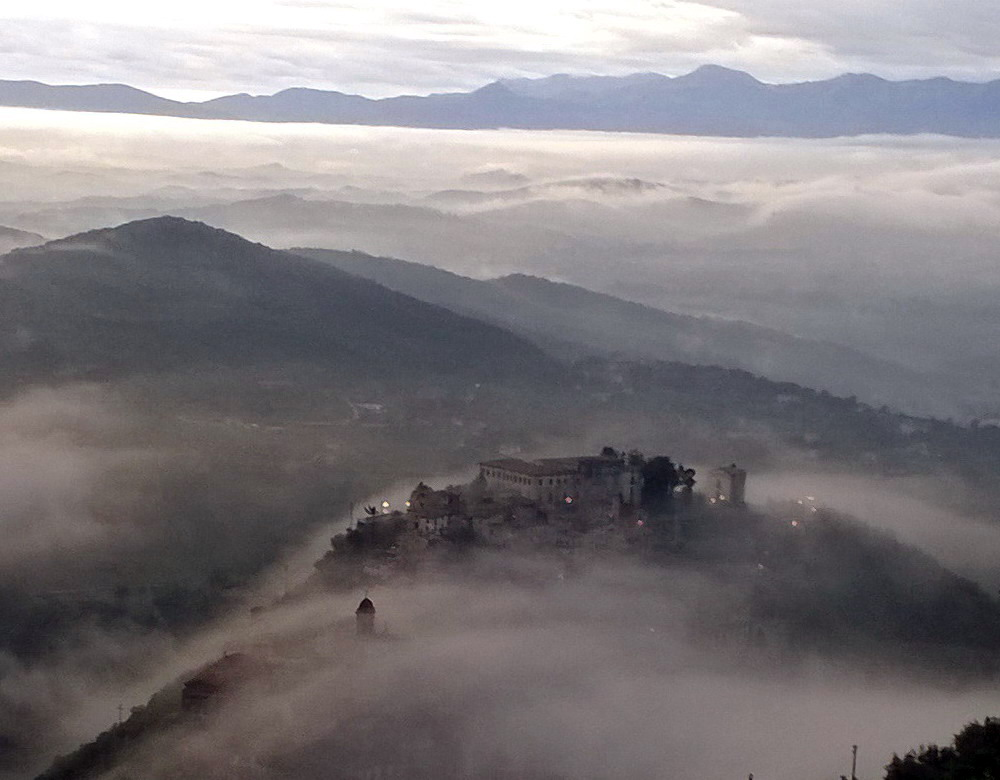
Arpino

In the Valley there are numerous small towns of great artistic and cultural importance. A quick and incomplete presentation is given here. In addition to the aforementioned Abbey of Monte Cassino, the city of Cassino preserves the remains of the ancient Casinum and in particular an amphitheater dating back to the 1st century AD, a Roman theater (still in use) and a section of the Via Latina.

A little further north, in Roccasecca, there are the remains of the castle of the Counts of Aquino where St. Thomas Aquinas was born. In Monte San Giovanni Campano, on the right bank of the Liri, the castle where the saint was imprisoned by his family is preserved in excellent condition. The city of Arpino is particularly known for being the birthplace of Marcus Tullius Cicero and Gaius Marius, in the sixteenth century, Giuseppe Cesari, known as the Cavalier d'Arpino (Arpino's Knight). The city retains a perfectly preserved historic center, as well as megalithic walls that rise in the acropolis. It is also an important center for contemporary art thanks to the Umberto Mastroianni Foundation. Further north, in the High Latin Valley, in Grottaferrata, there is the Abbey of Santa Maria di Grottaferrata.

== Gallery ==
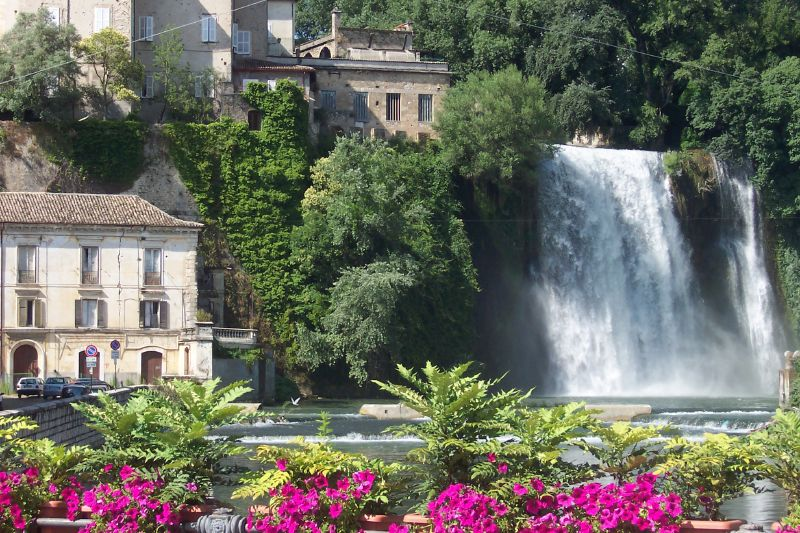
Isola del Liri

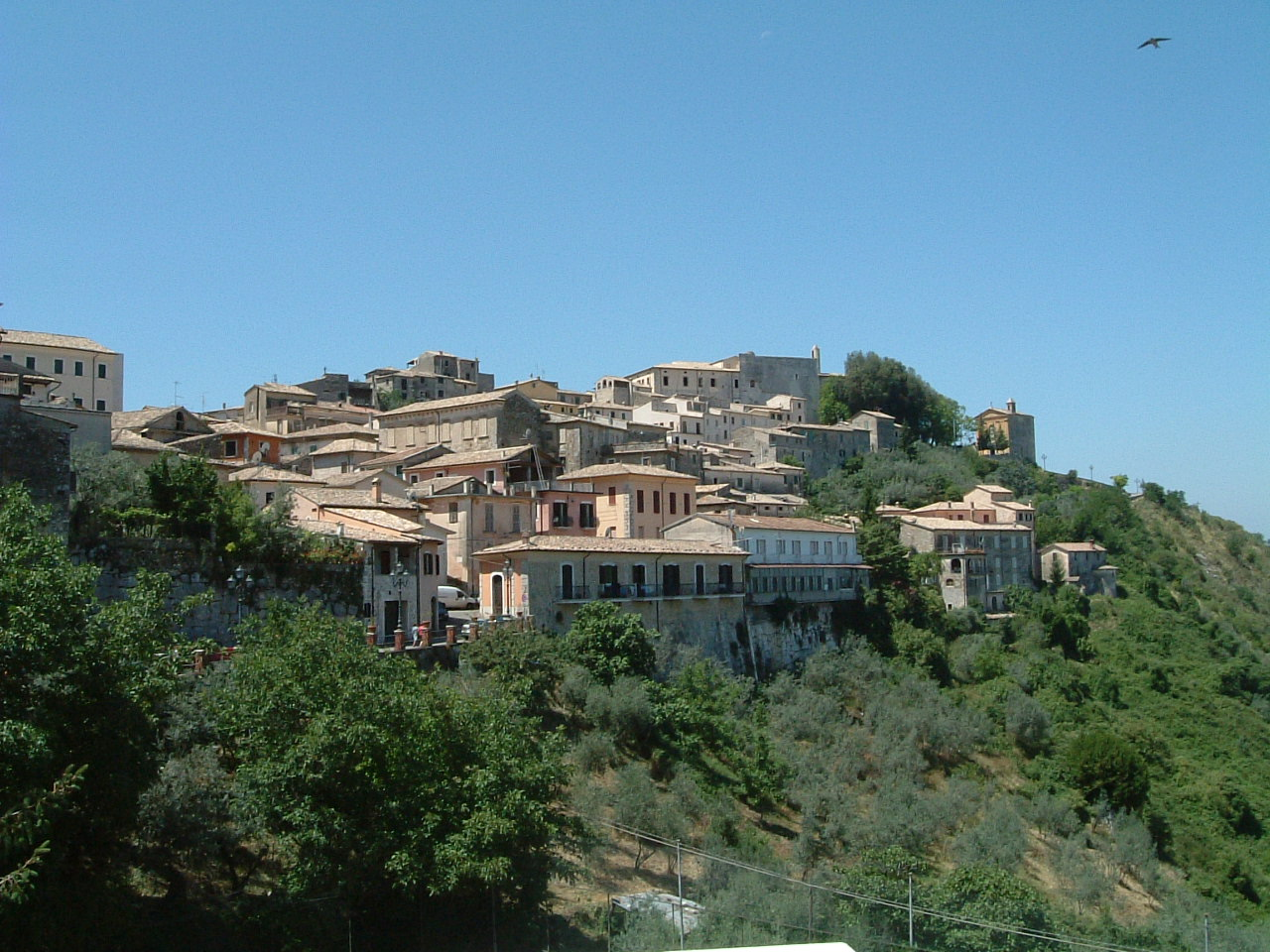
Arpino

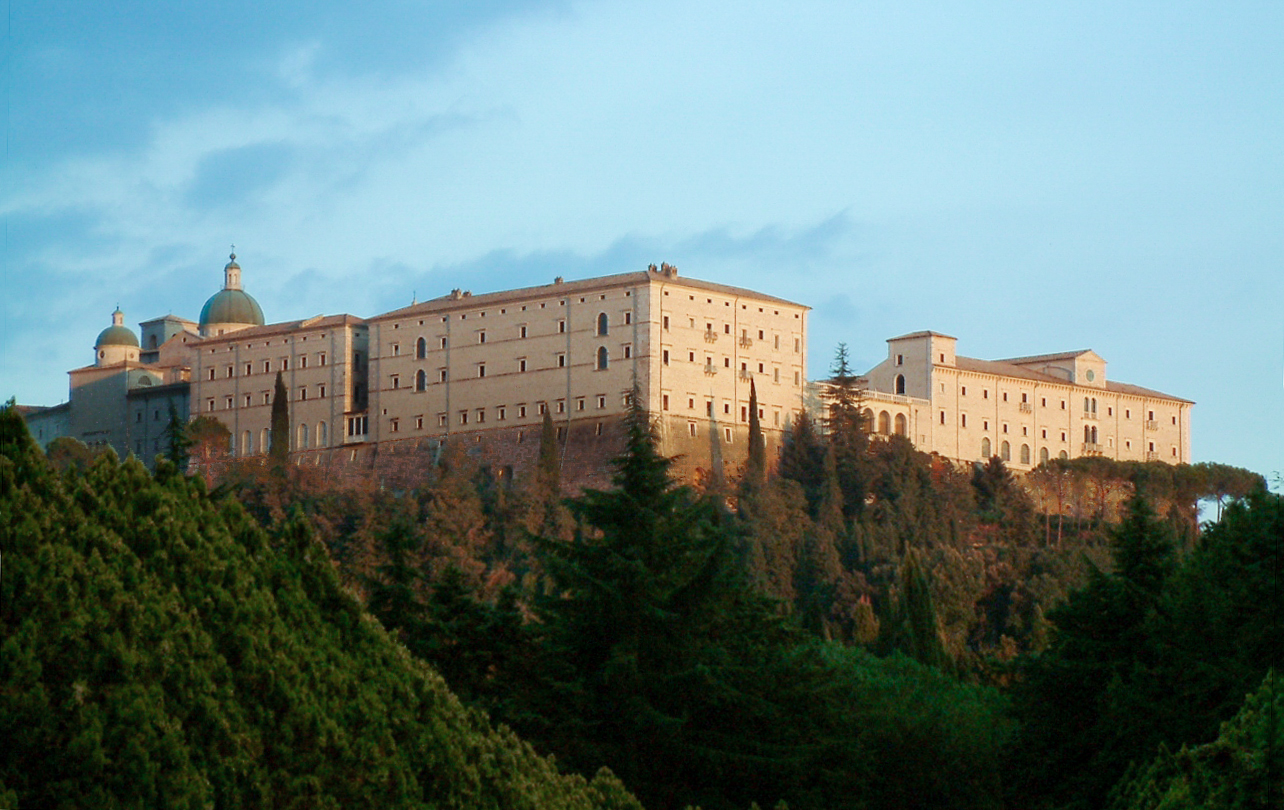
Monte Cassino

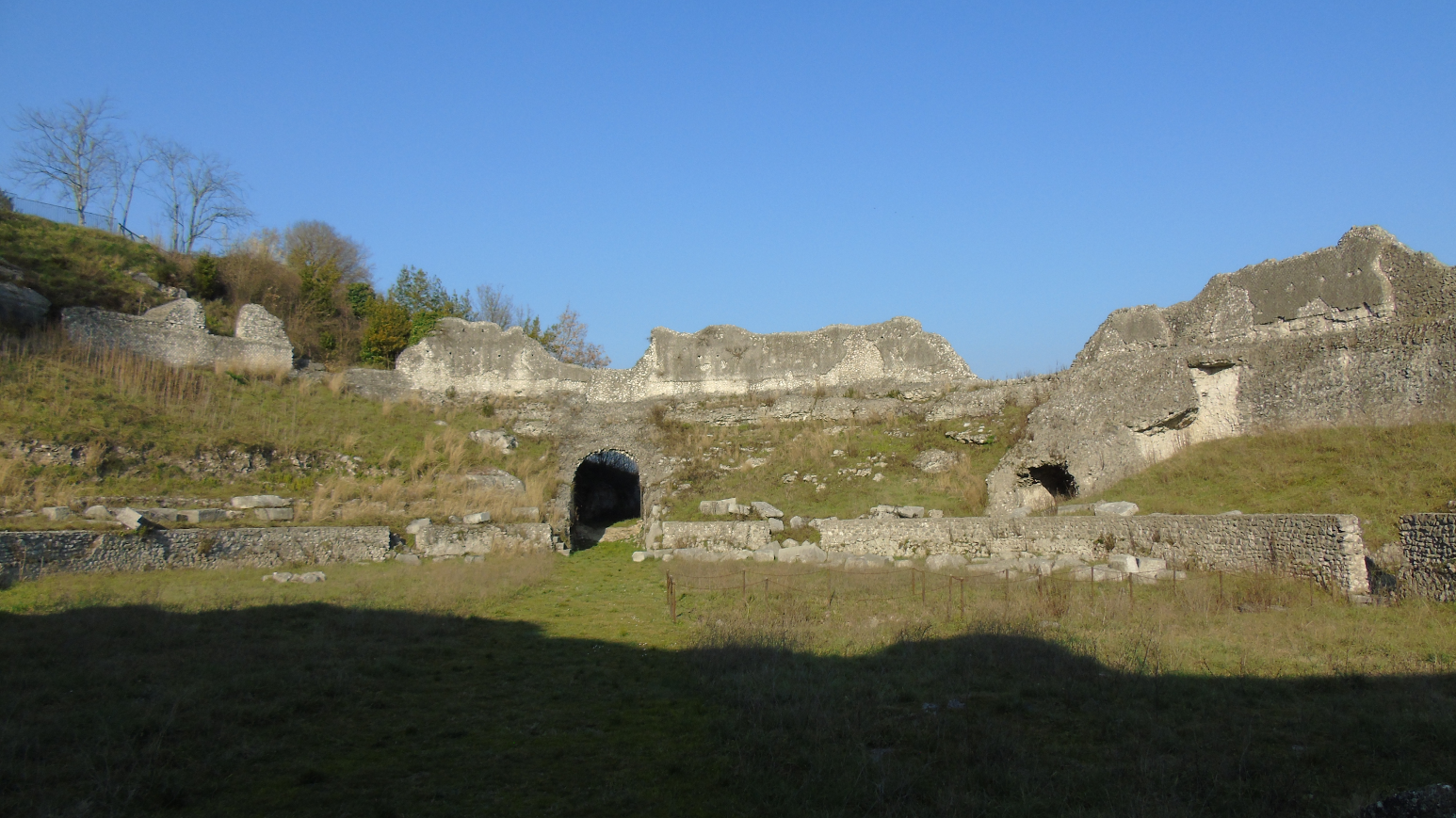
Cassino, Roman Amphitheatre

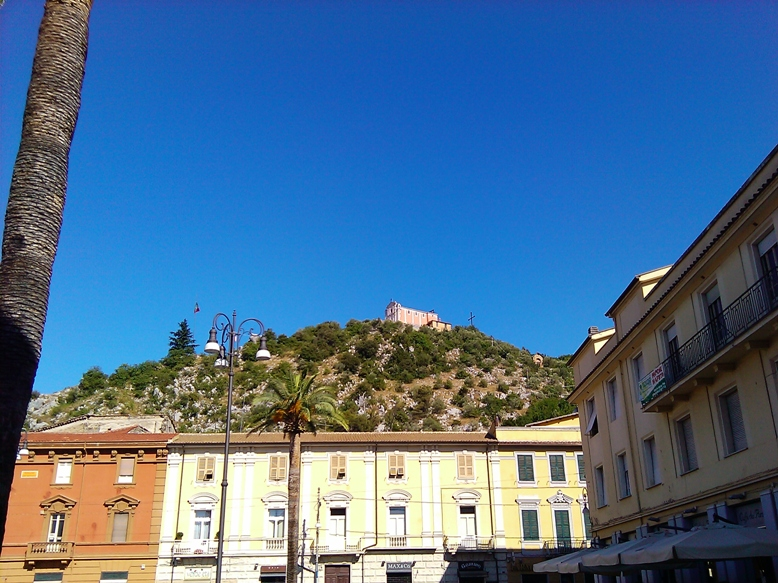
Sora

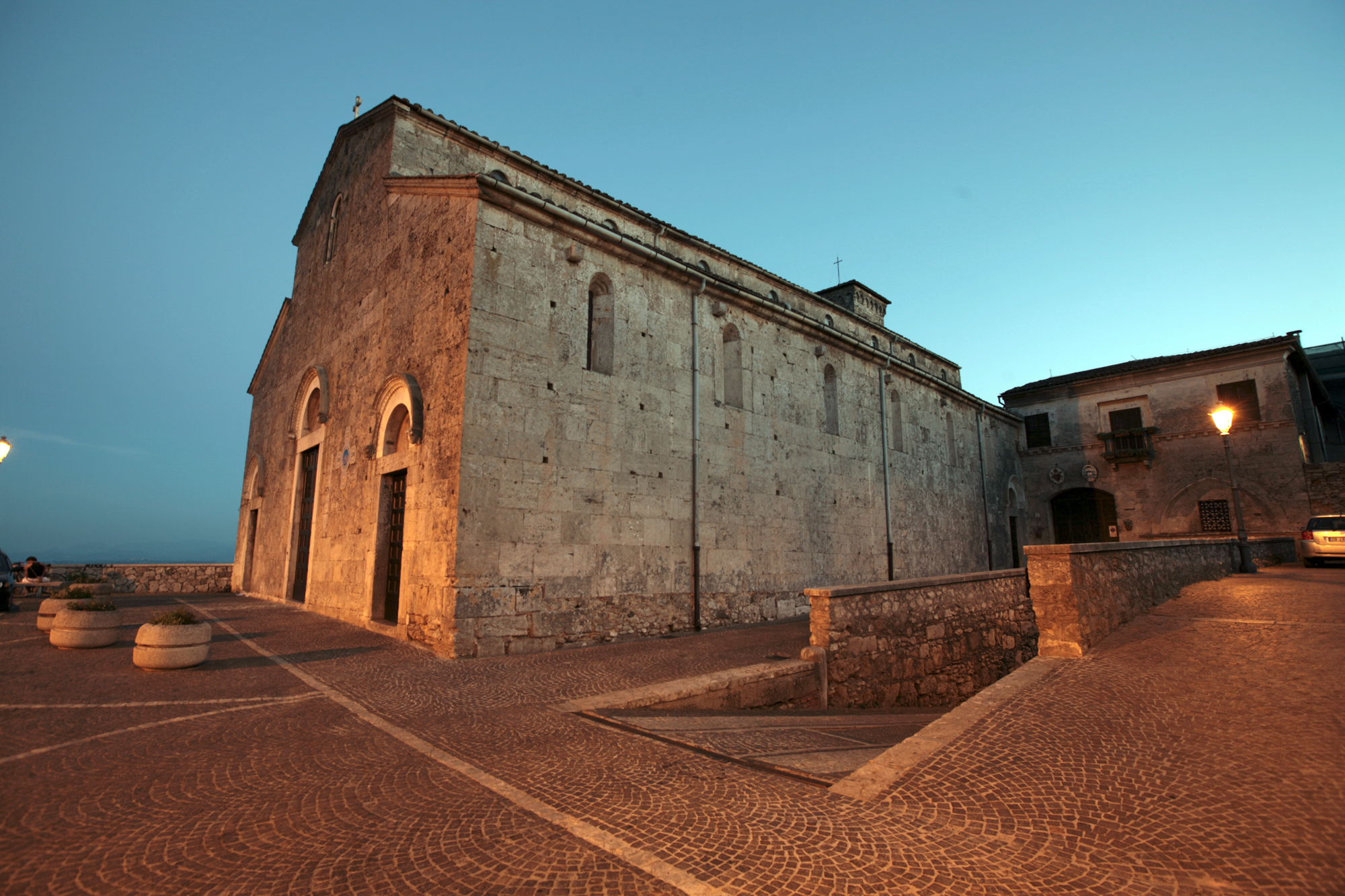
Ferentino, Duomo

== Bibliography ==
- Giuseppe Ponzi, Osservazioni geologiche fatte lungo la Valle Latina, Roma, 1849
- Sabrina Pietrobono, La Media Valle Latina: castelli e viabilità in una zona di frontiera, Società degli Archeologi Medievisti Italiani, 2006
- Sabrina Pietrobono, I monasteri della Media Valle Latina (Frosinone): aspetti topografici e scelte insediative, in Letizia Ermini Pani, Committenza, scelte insediative e organizzazione patrimoniale nel Medioevo, Atti del Convegno di studio, Tergu 15-17 settembre 2006, Centro Italiano di Studi sull'Alto Medioevo, Spoleto, 2007
- Italy, Volume 1, Naval Intelligence Division (of the United Kingdom), 1944, p. 292

== See also ==
- Latium
- Via Latina
- Latins
