= Constantius of Aquino =

Italian Roman Catholic saint

Saint Constantius of Aquino (Italian: Costanzo di Aquino) (6th century) was a bishop of Aquino in Italy, noted for his gift of prophecy, and a saint. He is commemorated in the Roman Martyrology on Sept. 1.

== Life ==
Gregory the Great noted the only certain dates of Constantius's life: he was already bishop of Aquino during the life of Saint Benedict, who died in 543. According to tradition, Constantius had to deal with a diocese possessed by demons; he sent to Benedict of Nursia in the monastery of Montecassino, who then drove out the devil with his prayers. During his tenure, Constantius experienced the destruction of the city in the war between Byzantium and the Goths at around 550; many residents were killed, others died of a plague.

A codification of the order of pericopes in a lectionary was dedicated to Constantius by Victor of Capua.

Constantius is said to have had the gift of divination. Gregory also records his last prophecy: on his deathbed Constantius foretold that he would be succeeded by a muleteer and a washerman, after which Aquino would have no more bishops. The next bishop after him was his deacon, Andrew, who had once been a muleteer, and after Andrew, Jovinus, a former washerman. During his episcopacy Aquino was overrun by the Lombards. Many of the inhabitants were killed by the invaders, and many more died of a plague, and there was no-one left fit to be bishop, whereby Constantius's prophecy was fulfilled.

On 10 December 1742 Bishop Spadea of Aquino translated the relics of Constantius from the old cathedral of Saint Peter, where they had been re-discovered, to the new cathedral dedicated to Saint Constantius himself, where they were placed beneath the high altar. This cathedral was destroyed in World War II, in May 1944, was rebuilt and in October 1963 dedicated to both Saint Constantius and to Saint Thomas Aquinas.

== Sources and external links ==
- SantieBeati.it: San Costanzo di Aquino (in Italian)
