= Castello di Monte San Giovanni Campano =

Coordinates: 41.640415°N 13.513699°E

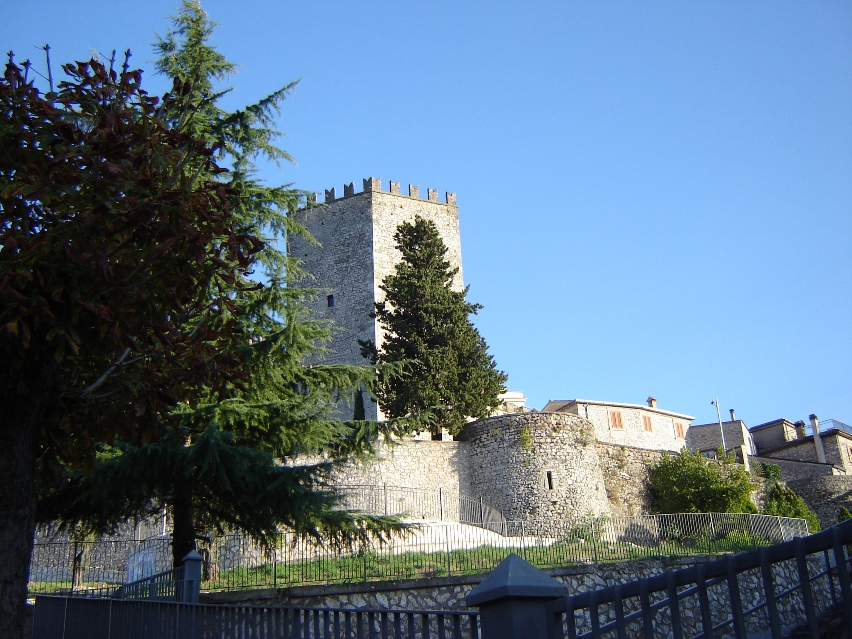
Castello di Monte San Giovanni Campano

The Castle of Monte San Giovanni is a medieval fortress in Monte San Giovanni Campano, Lazio, central Italy, built in the 11th century. The castle is known as the place where Thomas Aquinas was imprisoned by his family ca. 1240 to 1242 in an attempt to dissuade him from joining the Dominican Order. It is also the first fortification ever to be breached because of shelling from portable artillery, in 1495.

== History and description ==
The castle is distinguished by two towers, one quadrangular and one pentagonal. The pentagonal shape is unusual in castles of this type. The towers are nearly unmodified examples of 11th century defensive architecture. The remaining walls are 3.5 meters thick, with two bartizans, double-width patrol walks, and communications passages within the walls. The rooms in which Thomas Aquinas had been held are at the base of the rectangular tower.

These are remnants of a larger defensive structure that once included five towers and walls that entirely enclosed a ducal palace and supporting town. The palace was the home of the Count d'Aquino at the time of his son's imprisonment.

The castle town could hold more than a thousand defenders and had been for centuries one of the most efficient and impregnable fortresses of central Italy, reputedly withstanding a siege of seven years. It could not, however, resist the gunpowder artillery that Charles VIII of France used during his conquest of Naples in 1494-1495. Monte San Giovanni, then a border fort of Naples, fell after eight hours of bombardment. The French army of 25,000 then slaughtered the 700 inhabitants who were unable to escape. The rest of Naples put up little resistance after seeing the result at Monte San Giovanni.

Much of Monte San Giovanni was destroyed in the attack of 1494. Only two of the five main towers and two of the five palace buildings remain, along with three of the town gates. The rooms in which Thomas Aquinas had been held were saved and restored. His cell now holds a 16th-century Neapolitan-style triptych.

== See also ==
- List of castles in Italy
