= The Revolt of Fregellae =

125 BCE Latin revolt against the Roman Republic

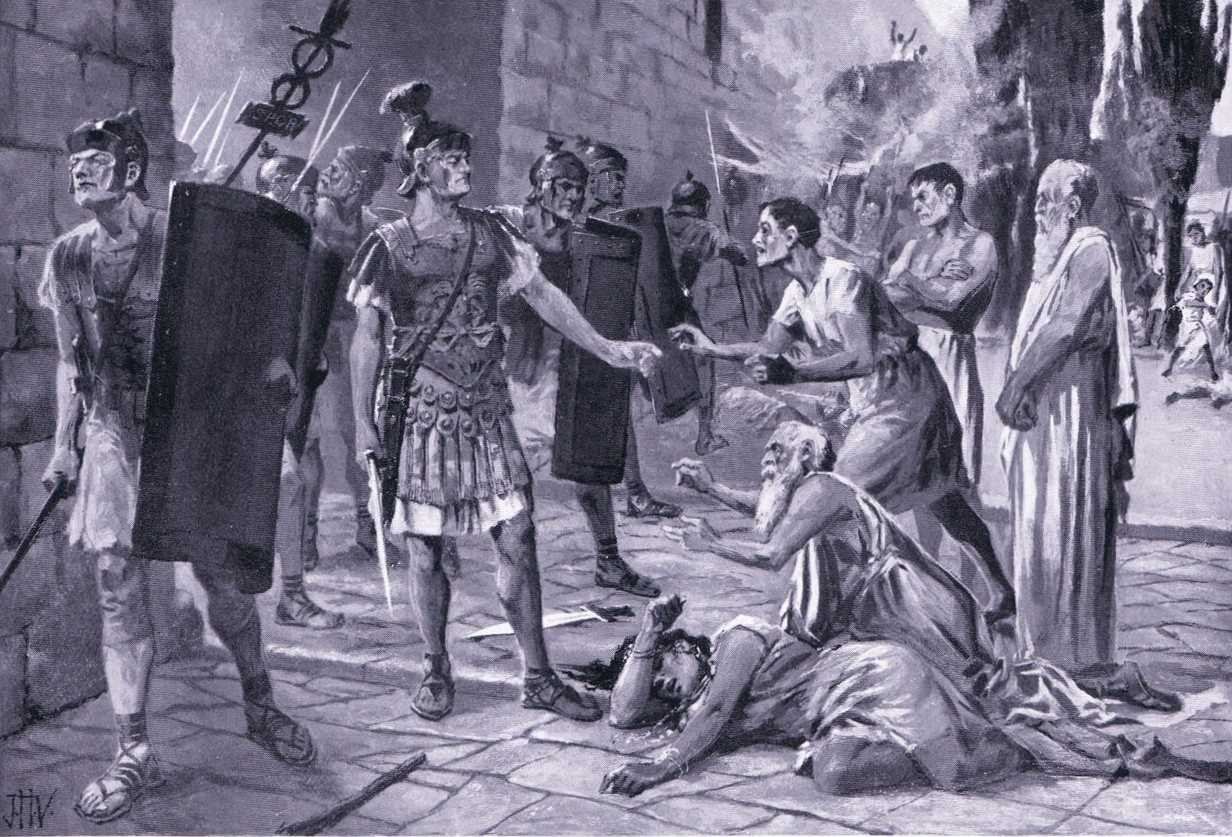
John Harris Valda - 'The Surrender of Fregellae'

In 125 BCE, the Latin town of Fregellae revolted against Rome demanding Roman citizenship. The Romans reacted by sending the praetor Lucius Opimius with an army to suppress the rebellion. A local traitor named Numitorius opened the gates to the Roman army; Opimius razed the town. A year later Fabrateria Nova was founded near the site of the destroyed town.

== See also ==
- List of Roman civil wars and revolts
