= Monte San Giovanni Campano =

- Comune
- Comune di Monte San Giovanni Campano
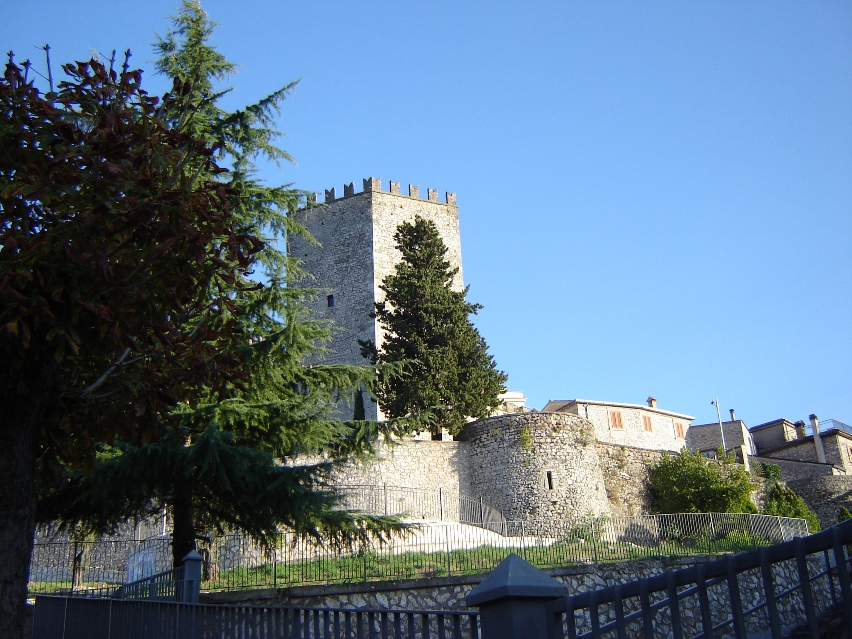
- The Castle of Monte San Giovanni Campano

- Coat of arms

- Location within Italy Location within Lazio
- Coordinates: 41°38′N 13°31′E
- Country: Italy
- Region: Lazio
- Province: Frosinone (FR)
- Frazioni: Anitrella, Chiaiamari, Colli, La Lucca, Porrino

Government
  - Mayor: Emiliano Cinelli

Area
  - Total: 48.5 km^{2} (18.7 sq mi)
- Elevation: 420 m (1,380 ft)

Population (December 2019)
  - Total: 12,388
  - Density: 255/km^{2} (662/sq mi)
- Demonym: Monticiani
- Time zone: UTC+1 (CET)
  - Summer (DST): UTC+2 (CEST)
- Postal code: 03025
- Dialing code: 0775
- Patron saint: St. Thomas of Aquino, Maria SS.ma del Suffragio
- Saint day: March 7
- Website: Official website

Monte San Giovanni Campano is a comune (municipality) of about 12,800 inhabitants in the province of Frosinone in the Italian region Lazio, located about 90 kilometres (56 mi) southeast of Rome and about 14 kilometres (9 mi) east of Frosinone. Monte San Giovanni Campano is in the Latin Valley

It is best known as the place where Thomas Aquinas was imprisoned by his family for two years. St. Thomas' cell now houses a 16th-century triptych of the Neapolitan School.

Monte San Giovanni is home to an 11th-century fortress, the Castello di Monte San Giovanni Campano. It was the first western fortification ever to be breached and captured using a bombardment from portable field artillery, when its castle was stormed by the troops of Charles VIII of France in a mere eight hours in 1495.

Monte San Giovanni was also a summer residence of Pope Adrian IV starting in 1155, and where sojourned the poet Vittoria Colonna.
