= Aquino, Italy =

Aquino
- Comune
- Comune di Aquino
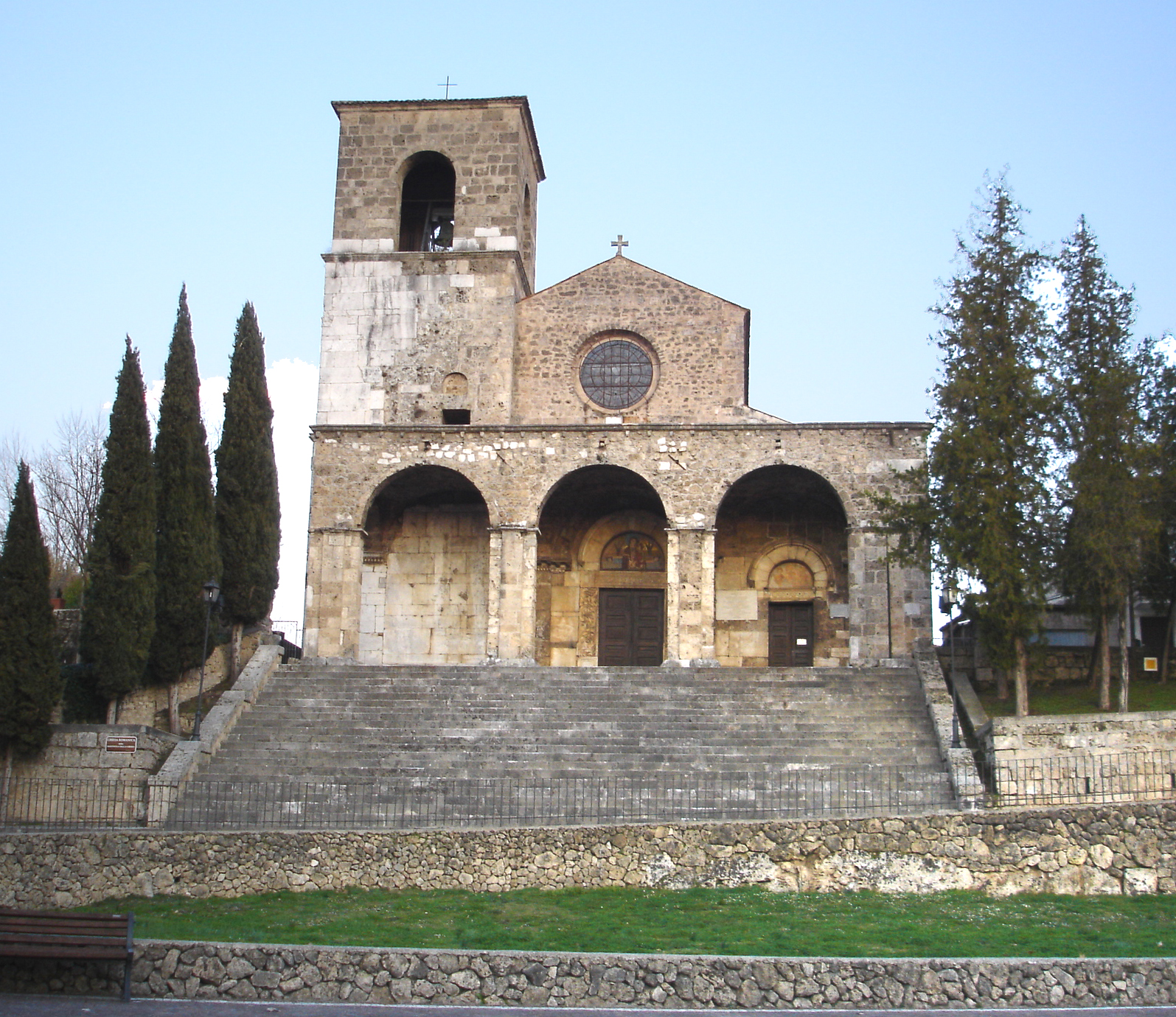
- Church of Santa Maria della Libera

- Coat of arms

- Location of Aquino in Italy Aquino (Lazio)
- Coordinates: 41°30′N 13°42′E
- Country: Italy
- Region: Lazio
- Province: Frosinone (FR)

Government
  - Mayor: Libero Mazzaroppi

Area
  - Total: 19 km^{2} (7.3 sq mi)
- Elevation: 106 m (348 ft)

Population (1 January 2021)
  - Total: 4,958
  - Density: 260/km^{2} (680/sq mi)
- Demonym: Aquinati
- Time zone: UTC+1 (CET)
  - Summer (DST): UTC+2 (CEST)
- Postal code: 03031
- Dialing code: 0776
- Patron saint: Saints Thomas Aquinas and Constantius of Aquino
- Saint day: March 7 and September 1
- Website: Official website

Aquino (Italian pronunciation: [aˈkwiːno]) is a town and comune in the province of Frosinone, in the Lazio region of Italy, 12 kilometres (7 mi) northwest of Cassino.

The name comes from the Latin Aquinum, probably from aqua, meaning "water" as witnessed by the abundance of water that still crosses the territory today, including many small springs.

== Physical geography ==
=== Territory ===
The town is located in the Valle del Liri (Liri valley), rich in water, including that of the Liri River itself, which flows from the mountains surrounding the valley. Until the 16th century, three lakes were present near the urban center, which later dried up.

=== Climate ===
Climate classification: zone C, 1 286 GG

== History ==
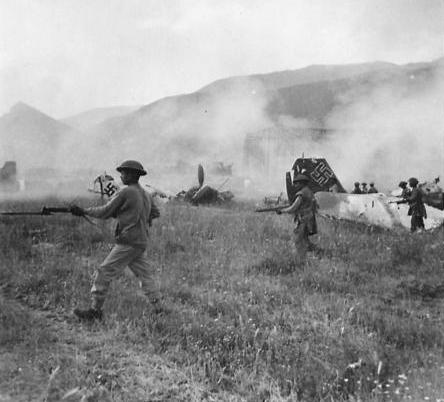
Indian troops advance across the Aquino aerodrome in 1944.

The town was founded by the Volsci, who successfully defended it against Samnite invasions.

After the Roman conquest in the 4th century BC, Aquinum became an important commercial and production centre situated on the ancient Via Latina. In 211 BC it was given the title of urbs, previously the prerogative of Rome alone. In 125 BC the nearby town of Fregellae was destroyed and Aquinum grew to become the most important nucleus between Rome and Capua.

Aquinum was a municipium in the time of Cicero, and made a colonia during the Triumvirate.

Aquinum is thought to be the birthplace of the poet Juvenal, and also of emperor Pescennius Niger.

The diocese of Aquinum was established c. 450. The patron saint of Aquino is St. Constantius of Aquino (San Costanzo), a 6th-century bishop. After the death of bishop Jovinus, c. 593, the seat remained vacant.

The county of Aquino within the Norman kingdom of Sicily was established in the 12th century. St. Thomas Aquinas, OP was born in 1225 in the castle of Roccasecca, 8 kilometres (5 mi) north of Aquino, to a collateral branch of the family of the counts of Aquino.

== Main sights ==
One of the gates through which the Via Latina passed, now called Porta San Lorenzo, is still well preserved, and there are remains within the walls (portions of which, built of large blocks of limestone, still remain) of two (so called) temples, a basilica and an amphitheatre.

Outside, on the south is a well-preserved 1st century BC triumphal arch with composite capitals, known as Arco di Marcantonio, and close to it the basilica of Santa Maria Libera, a 9th-century building in the Romanesque style erected over the remains of an ancient temple of Hercules Liberator, now roofless. Several Roman inscriptions are built into it, and many others that have been found indicate the ancient importance of the place, which, though it does not appear in early history, is vouched for by Cicero and Strabo.
