= Caieta =

Mythological Greek character

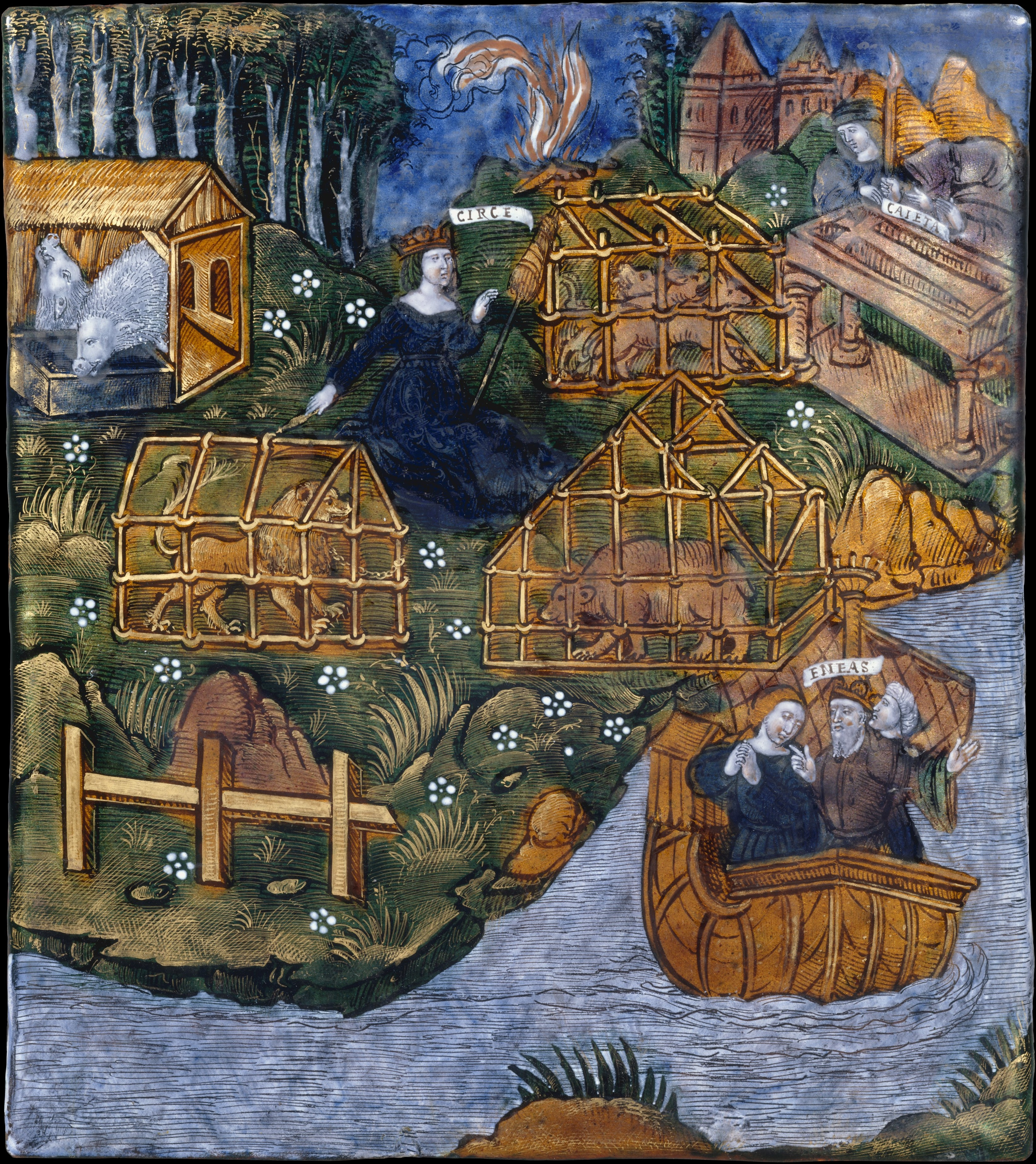
Aeneas Erects a Tomb to his Nurse, Caieta, and Flees the Country of Circe (Aeneid, Book VII)

In Roman mythology, Caieta (Ancient Greek: Καιήτη, Cāiēta) was the wet-nurse of Aeneas. The Roman poet Vergil locates her grave on the bay at Gaeta, to which she also gives her name (cf. Caietae Portus). The poet Ovid, working a generation later, provides an epitaph:

HIC • ME • CAIETAM • NOTAE • PIETATIS • ALVMNUS
EREPTAM • ARGOLICO • QVO • DEBVIT • IGNE • CREMAVIT

"Here me, Caieta, snatched from Grecian flames, my pious son consumed with fitting fire." The fourth-century commentator Servius writes that there was some controversy about whose wet-nurse Caieta was: in addition to Aeneas, he offers Creusa and Ascanius as possibilities.
