= Via Latina =

Roman road of Italy

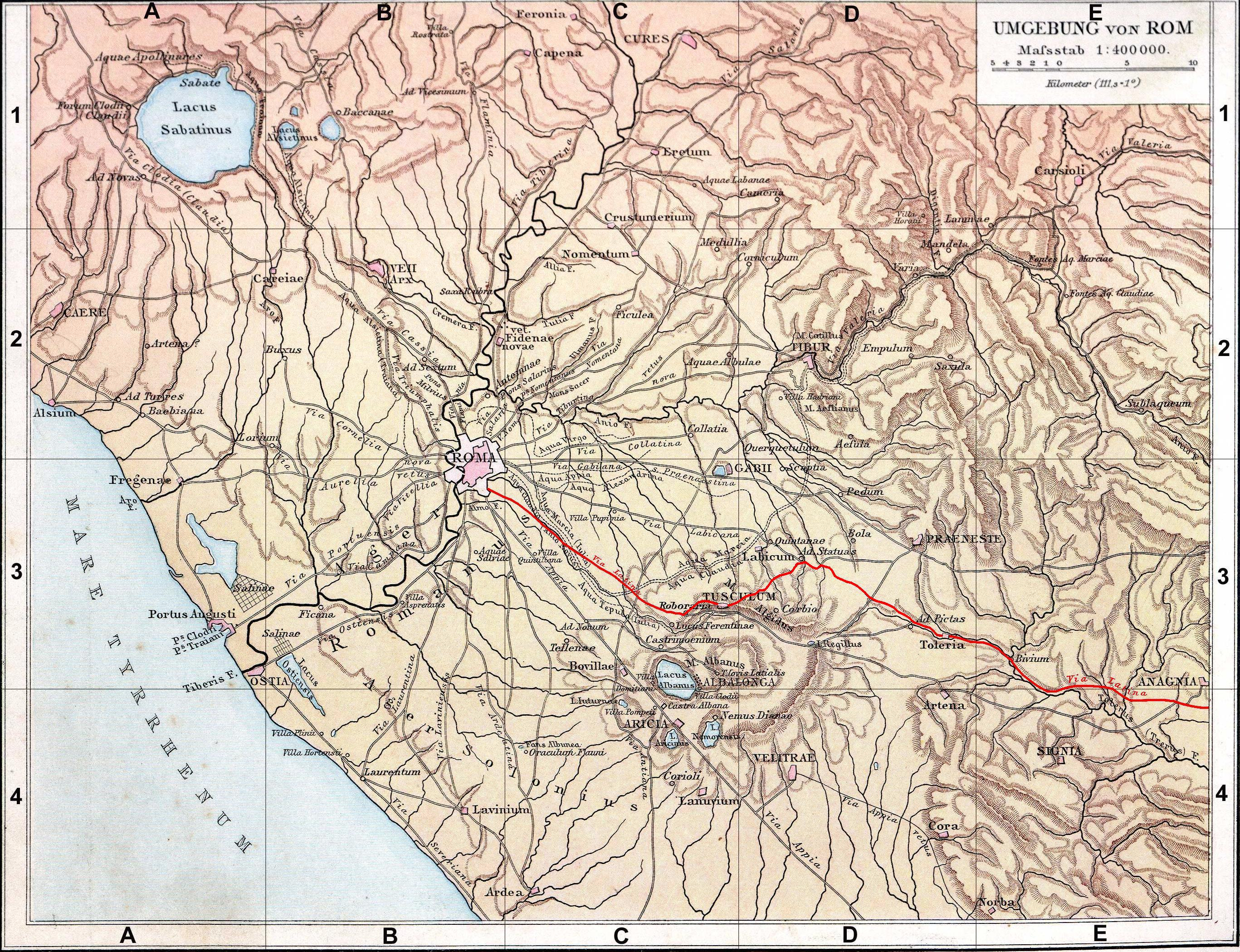
- Via Latina in a red colour from an 1886 map
- Interactive map of Via Latina
- Type: Roman road
- Periods: 3rd Century BC
- Location: Rome to Benevento, Italy

History
- Built by: Roman Republic

Via Latina and Via Appia

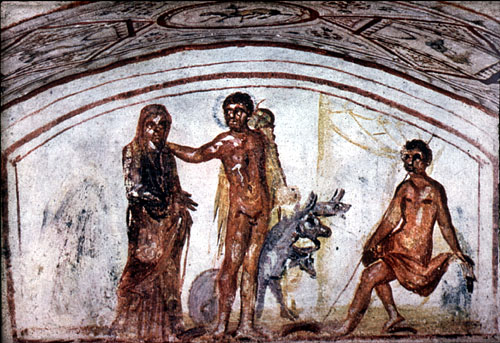
Wall painting in the Catacomb of the Via Latina, 4th century.

The Via Latina (Latin for "Latin Road") was a Roman road of Italy, running southeast from Rome for about 200 kilometers.

== Route ==
It led from the Porta Latina in the Aurelian Walls of Rome to the pass of Mount Algidus; it was important in the early military history of Rome. It must have preceded the Via Appia as a route to Campania, in as much as the Latin colony at Cales was founded in 334 BC and must have been accessible from Rome by road, whereas the Via Appia was made only twenty-two years later. It follows, too, a far more natural line of communication, without the engineering difficulties that the arrow-straight Via Appia had to overcome. As a through-route, it preceded the Via Labicana, though the latter may have been preferred in later times.

After their junction, the Via Latina continued to follow the valley of the Trerus (River Sacco), following a line taken by the modern railway to Naples, and passing below the Hernican hill-towns, Anagni (where it joined with the Via Praenestina), Ferentino, Frosinone, and others. At Fregellae, it crossed the Liri, and then passed through Aquino and Cassino, both comparatively low-lying towns. It then entered the interval between the Apennines and the volcanic group of Rocca Monfina, and the original road and, instead of traversing it, turned abruptly northeast over the mountains to Venafro, thus giving a direct communication with the interior of Samnium by roads to Isernia and Telese.

After the disorders of the civil wars, the via Latina was repaired by a group of prominent Romans, including Marcus Valerius Messalla Corvinus; the work was under way in 27 BC, at the time of Tibullus' elegy.

In later times, however, there was in all probability a shortcut by Rufrae along the line taken by the modern highroad and railway. The two lines rejoined near the present railway station of Caianiello, and the road ran to Teanum and Cales, and so to Casilinum, where there was the crossing of the Volturno and the junction with the Via Appia. The distance from Rome to Casilinum was 129 Roman miles by the Via Appia, 135 Roman miles by the old Via Latina through Venafrum, 126 Roman miles by the shortcut past Rufrae (now Presenzano). Considerable remains of the road exist in the neighborhood of Rome; for the first 40 Roman miles, as far as Compitum Anagninum, it is not followed by any modern road; while farther on in its course it is in the main identical with the modern highroad.

== Tombs and Catacombs ==
The Tombs of Via Latina are tombs over a short stretch of the road just outside Rome. Above ground they are largely reconstructed, but the underground chambers survived. They are now in an "archaeological park". They are not to be confused with the small Christian Via Latina Catacomb, only rediscovered in 1955, with many paintings. It is unknown whether the catacombs were built as one big master plan or if it was built in stages. The catacombs consist of many separate rooms all connected by a series of corridors. To organize the excavation, each room was given a letter to symbolize where it was located and what art work was depicted inside. The excavation of the catacombs took place in four stages starting with the stairways and finishing with the 3 corridors and their adjoining rooms.

== Artwork of the Catacombs ==
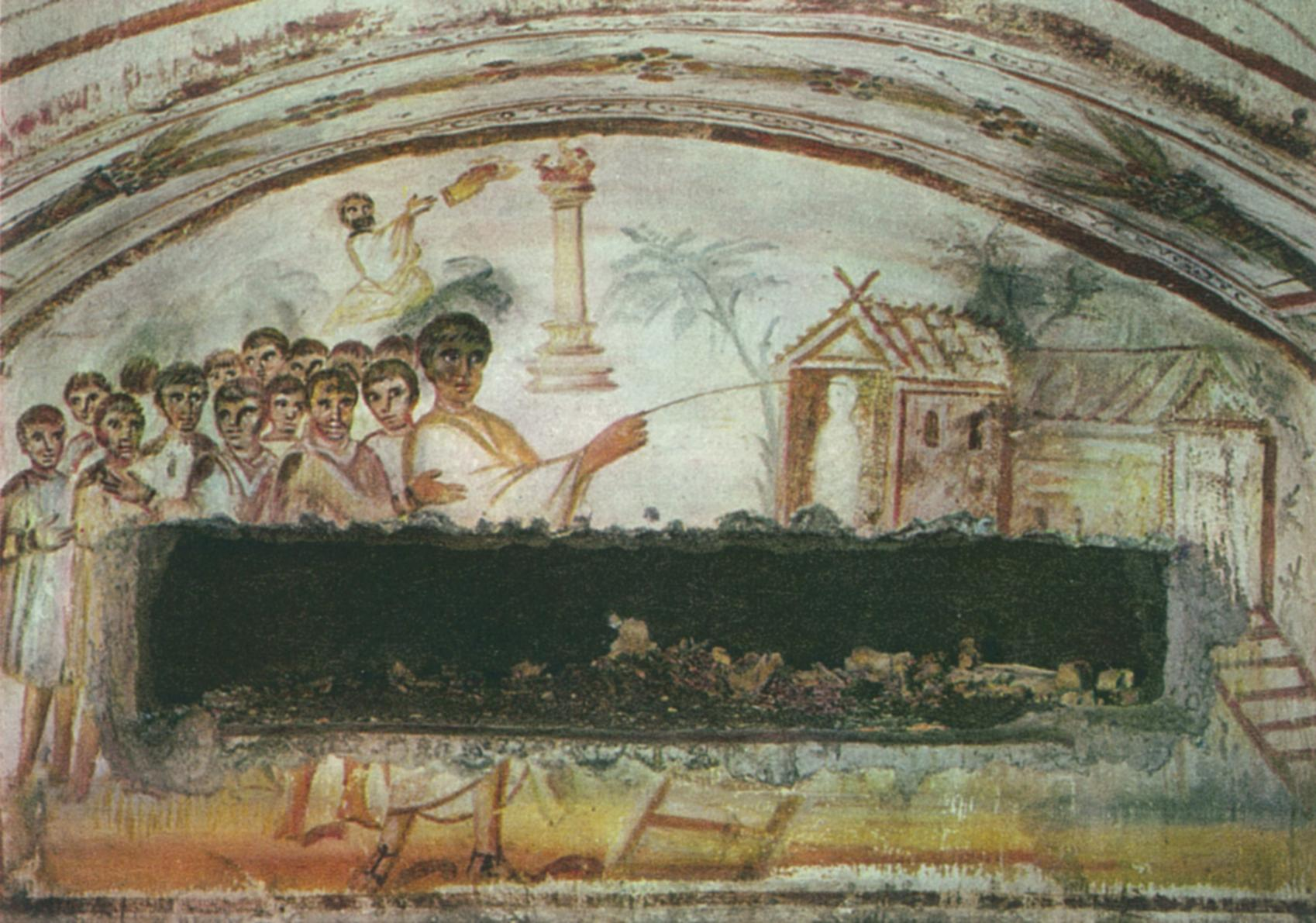
Resurrection of Lazarus, Catacombs of Via Latina.

The Catacombs of Via Latina, compared to other Roman catacombs, were recently discovered. The artwork within the catacombs is from the Medieval period. The art in the tomb is dated back to the 4th century. These particular catacombs in Rome, Italy, depict images of both pagan and Christian artwork. It is unknown whether this tomb belonged to a specific family or a fraternity. The art fills every room in the catacombs. The catacombs were excavated in 1955 and published officially in 1962.

Each room inside the catacombs has a different painting or subject depicted on the walls. Christian stories from the Old Testament and the New Testament fill the vast majority of rooms. Pagan art, specifically the hero Hercules, are included within specific rooms to which is one of the reasons why the Via Latina catacombs are special. Every room is typically denoted with a letter to help with organization of the different rooms and artworks. Room N is decorated of entirely paintings of the pagan hero Hercules The paintings show Hercules as a hero or savior. There is also said to be a focus on the after-life and life after death in Room N. For many of the other rooms, the subject matter is primarily Christian art, depicting images of both the Old Testament and the New Testament. Notable art scenes depicted are the Flood Scene, Abraham's vision of the Three Angels under the Oak of Mamre, Crossing of the Red Sea, and the Ascension of Elijah and the Good Shepherd.

The photo on the right, the Resurrection of Lazarus, is one of the many religious stories told on the walls of the catacombs. Viewers can see the figure assumed to be Jesus raising a man from the dead as his disciples watch with intent. Viewers may also notice Moses in the background receiving a message from above. The style of the art work is similar throughout every room in the catacombs, meaning that all of the artworks were produced by one person or a group of people who used the same style and technique.

== See also ==
- Valle Latina
- Catacombs of Rome
- Early Christian art and architecture
