= Ceprano =

Ceprano Ceprane
- Comune
- Comune di Ceprano
- Coat of arms

- Location within Italy Location within Lazio
- Coordinates: 41°33′N 13°31′E
- Country: Italy
- Region: Lazio
- Province: Frosinone (FR)

Government
  - Mayor: Marco Galli

Area
  - Total: 38.03 km^{2} (14.68 sq mi)
- Elevation: 105 m (344 ft)

Population (1 Gennaio 2023)
  - Total: 8,137
  - Density: 214.0/km^{2} (554.2/sq mi)
- Demonym: Cepranesi
- Time zone: UTC+1 (CET)
  - Summer (DST): UTC+2 (CEST)
- Postal code: 03024
- Dialing code: 0775
- Patron saint: St. Arduin of Ceprano
- Saint day: July 28
- Website: Official website

Ceprano (Central-Northern Latian dialect: Ceprane) is a comune in the province of Frosinone, in the Valle Latina, part of the Lazio region of Central Italy.

It is 106 kilometres (66 mi) south of Rome and about 127 kilometres (79 mi) north of Naples.

In 1994, the Ceprano Man, a 450,000 year old prehistoric human skull cap, was discovered in the area.

== History ==
Ceprano's origins are connected to a Roman colony founded in 328 BC on the left bank of the Liri River, called Fregellae. It was destroyed in 316 BC and then rebuilt starting from 124 BC, under the new name of Fregellanum. The ruins of the ancient city can be seen in the nearby municipality of Arce.

Ceprano was part of the Papal States, from roughly the 6th century until 1870. It was fortified by Pope Julius II in 1563.

Ceprano is the site of a Napoleonic battle during the Neapolitan campaign where the Habsburg imperial army under Irish Marshal Laval Graf Nugent von Westmeath defeated Joachim Murat.

After Italian Unification and the Capture of Rome, the town was part of the Kingdom of Italy, a constitutional monarchy ruled from Rome by the House of Savoy. On 27 January 1862 the Rome-Ceprano Railroad was opened for service.

On 28 May 1944 Ceprano was liberated by Canadian troops as part of the Allies' push against German occupation.

Since 1946 Ceprano has been part of the Italian Republic.

== Twin towns ==
- Trani, Italy
- Manfredonia, Italy
- Sichuan province, People's of Republic of China
- Almendralejo, Spain

== See also ==
- Homo cepranensis
