= Sacco (river) =

River in Italy

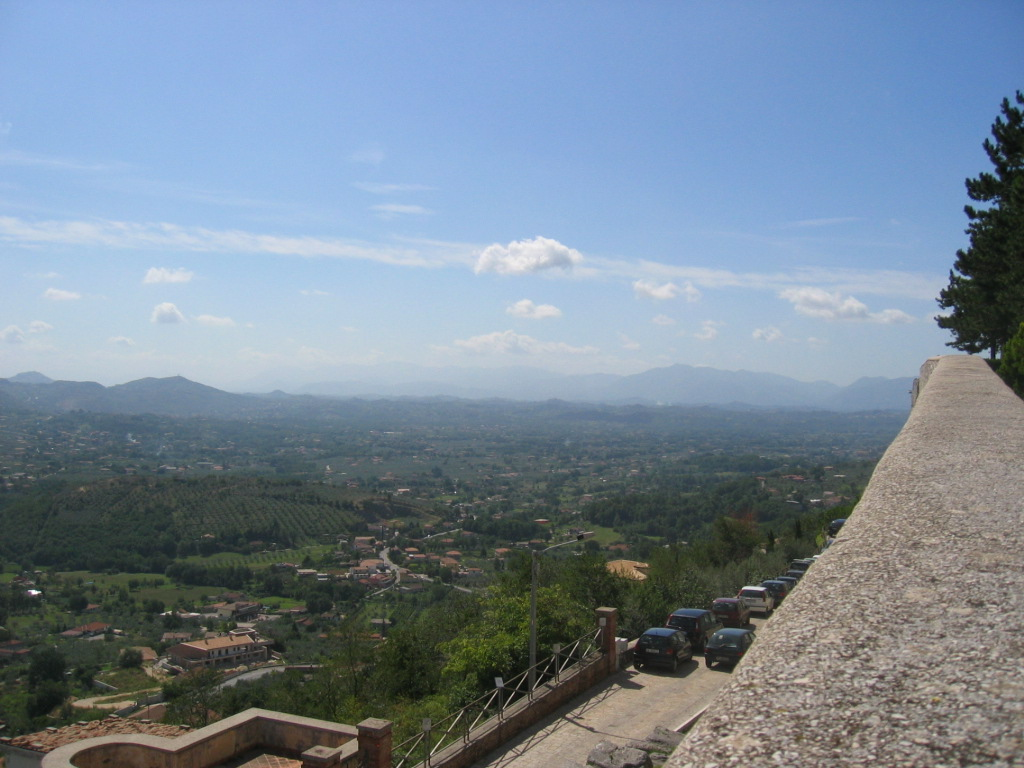
- The river’s valley seen from the Acropolis of Alatri

Location
- Country: Italy

Physical characteristics
- Source
  - location: Colle Cerao, Monti Simbruini
- Mouth: Isoletta di Arce
  - coordinates: 41.5203°N 13.5432°E
- Length: 87 km (54 mi)
- Discharge
  - average: 16 m^{3}/s (570 cu ft/s)

Basin features
- Progression: Liri→ Garigliano→ Tyrrhenian Sea

The Sacco is a river of central Italy, a right tributary of the Liri. It flows between the Metropolitan City of Rome Capital and the province of Frosinone in Lazio.

== Territory ==
The river originates from the Prenestini Mountains, formed by the confluence of two streams of the Monti Simbruini in the Apennines of Abruzzo in Lazio, and flows south-east for a total length of 87 km, crossing the Middle Latin valley between the Ernici Mountains to the northeast and the Lepini Mountains to the southwest; At the height of Ceprano it flows into the Liri River from the right.

The Sacco's main tributaries are the Cosa and the Alabro.

In old sources, it is known also the Tolero, from its ancient name Tolerus or Trerus.

== Environmental issues ==
The Sacco river valley is a vast territory between the provinces of Rome and Frosinone in the central-southern Italy. The intensive exploitation that for decades affected this valley due to no-scruple companies and crooked public administration offices, produced an unprecedented environmental and social disaster.
