= Fregellae =

Ancient Italian town (Latium)

Coordinates: 41°32′12″N 13°32′20″E

- Location within Lazio Location within Italy
- Type: settlement
- Periods: Hellenistic
- Cultures: Roman Republic
- Location: Comune di Arce, Italy
- Region: Province of Frosinone

History
- Built: fourth century BC
- Abandoned: 125 BC

Site notes
- Excavation dates: yes
- Archaeologists: Filippo Coarelli
- Condition: ruined
- Public access: no
- Website: Museo Archeologico di Fregellae di Ceprano

Fregellae was an ancient town of Latium adiectum, situated on the Via Latina between Aquinum (modern Aquino) and Frusino (now Frosinone), in central Italy, near the left branch of the Liris.

== History ==
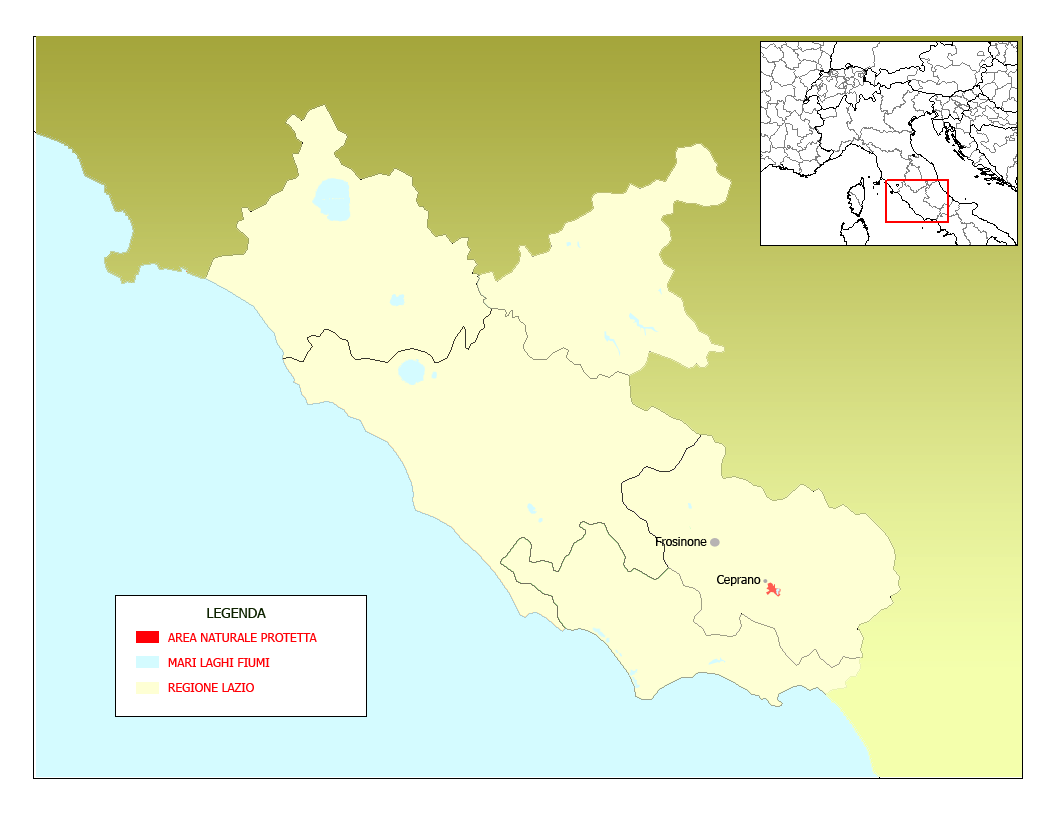
Mappa Riserva naturale Antiche Città di Fregellae e Fabrateria Nova e del Lago di San Giovanni Incarico.

Fregellae was said to have been founded in early times by the Opici or Oscans, near the modern Arce, and later to have belonged the Volsci. It was apparently destroyed by the Samnites a little before 330 BC; in that year the people of Fabrateria Vetus (modern Ceccano) sought the help of Rome against them and in 328 BC a Latin colony was established there. The place was taken in 320 BC by the Samnites, but re-established by the Romans in 313 BC. It was largely faithful to Rome: by burning the bridges over the Liris, it blocked Hannibal's advance on Rome in 212 BC at the cost of his general devastation of the area. (A messenger from the city caused panic throughout Rome until word arrived that a Roman army was en route from Capua.) Fregellae's agent headed the deputation of the 18 non-revolting colonies Roman Senate in 209 BC, after 12 other colonies had revolted during the war.

Fregellae appears to have been a very important and flourishing place owing to its command of the crossing of the Liris and to its position in a fertile territory. After the rejection of Flaccus's proposals for the extension of Roman citizenship in 125 BC, a revolt broke out against Rome. A local traitor named Numitorius opened the gates to the Roman army under the praetor Lucius Opimius. The severity of its razing was later credited by the Romans with having prevented a general uprising among the Italian allies.

The following year, Fregellae's place was taken by the colony of Fabrateria Nova, 3 miles (4.8 km) to the southeast on the opposite bank of the Liris. Under the empire, Fregellae is recorded as a small village and a post station at modern Ceprano called Fregellanum is mentioned in the itineraries.

== Archaeology ==
The site is clearly visible in the territory of Arce, in the frazione Isoletta di Arce, not far from the border with the municipality of Ceprano and San Giovanni Incarico. Remains excavated starting from 1978 include items from the Republican age and a large temple of Aesculapius. Some of the items are in the museum of Ceprano.

== See also ==
- Fregellae's revolt

== Sources ==
- F. Coarelli. ed. Fregellae (1981).
- F. Coarelli and M. Caputo Il santuario di Esculapio.
