= Liri =

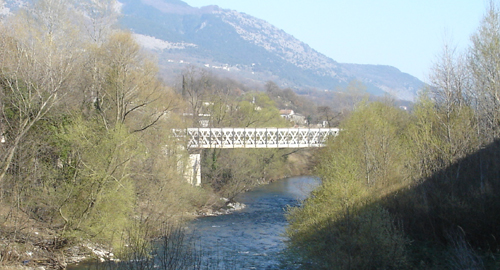
- Bridge over the Liri

Location
- Country: Italy

Physical characteristics
- Source
  - location: Monti Simbruini
  - elevation: about 1,000 m (3,300 ft)
- Mouth: Garigliano
  - coordinates: 41.4098°N 13.8627°E
- Length: 120 km (75 mi)
- Basin size: 4,140 km^{2} (1,600 sq mi)
- Discharge
  - average: 50 m^{3}/s (1,800 cu ft/s) (at Pontecorvo)

Basin features
- Progression: Garigliano→ Tyrrhenian Sea

The Liri (Latin Liris or Lyris, previously, Clanis; Greek: Λεῖρις) is one of the principal rivers of central Italy, flowing into the Tyrrhenian Sea a little below Minturno under the name Garigliano.

== Source and route ==
The Liri's source is in the Monte Camiciola, elevation 1,701 metres (5,581 ft), in the Monti Simbruini of central Apennines (Abruzzo, comune of Cappadocia). It flows at first in a southeasterly direction through a long trough-like valley, parallel to the general direction of the Apennines, until it reaches the city of Sora.

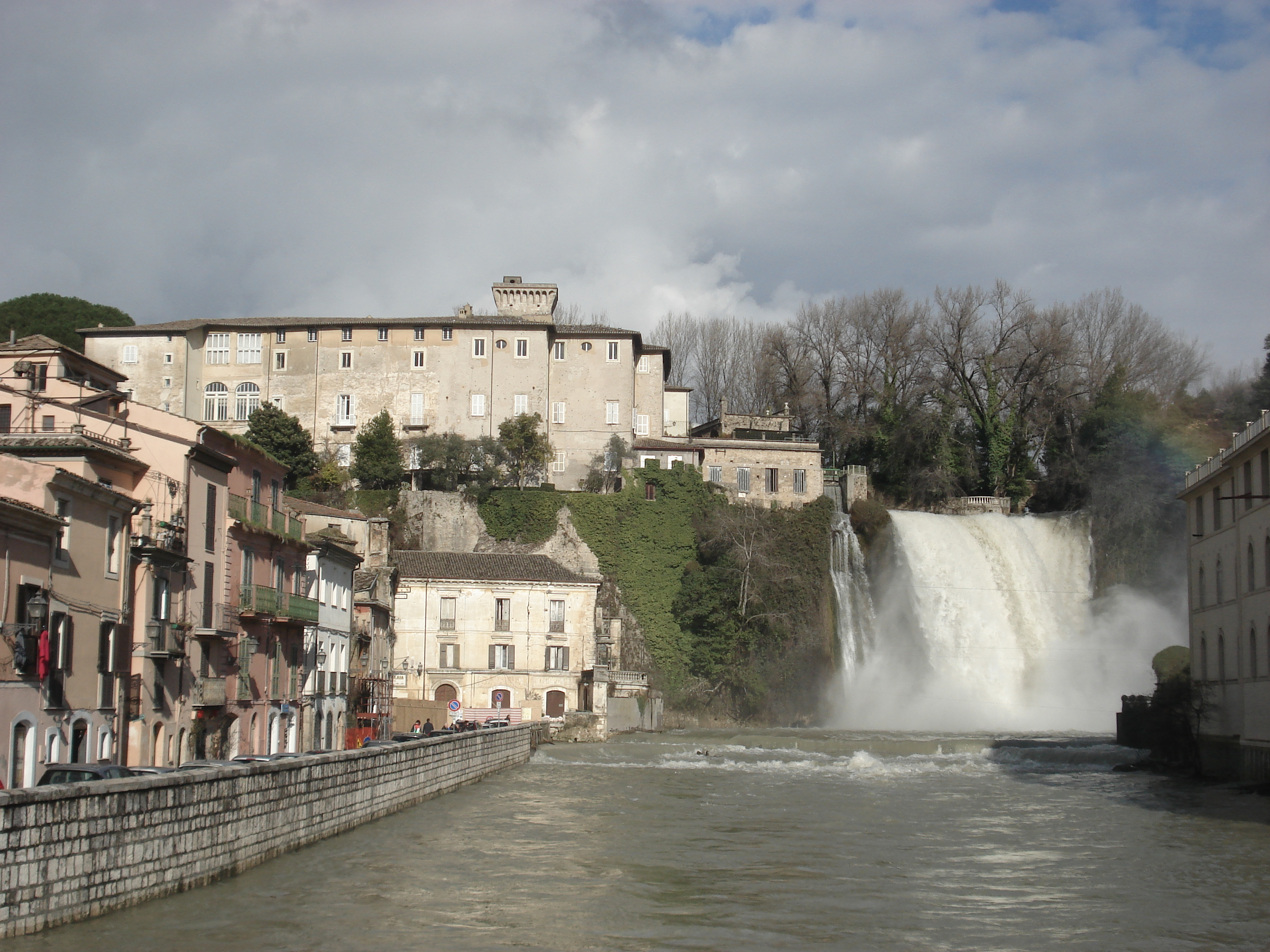
Liri falls in Isola del Liri

In the upper part of Isola del Liri it receives the waters of Fibreno and then it divides into two branches which then rejoin, surrounding the lower part of the town (Isola del Liri stands for Liri Island). One branch makes a 28-metre (92 ft) high waterfall situated in the centre, a unique case in Europe.

A dam is built on the river after the confluence with the Sacco at Ceprano. The last important Liri's tributary is the Melfa, with which it joins near Aquino. After Cassino it receives the waters of the Gari, and afterwards it is known as Garigliano.

The Liri-Garigliano system has a total water drainage basin of 5,020 square kilometres (1,940 mi^{2}).

== History ==
Both Strabo and Pliny tell us that it was originally called Clanis, a name which appears to have been common to many Italian rivers (see for ex. Clanio and Lagni); the former writer erroneously assigns its sources to the country of the Vestini; an opinion which is adopted also by Lucan. The surrounding area was devastated by Hannibal during his invasion in response to the locals' having burnt the bridges over the river. In 238 BC, the adjacent city of Fregella was the site of a crushed rebellion against Roman rule. The Liris is noticed by several of the Roman poets, as a very gentle and tranquil stream, a character which it well deserves in the lower part of its course, where it was described by a nineteenth century traveller as a wide and noble river, winding under the shadow of poplars through a lovely vale, and then gliding gently towards the sea.

At the mouth of the Liris near Minturnae, was an extensive sacred grove consecrated to Marica, a nymph or local divinity, who was represented by a tradition, adopted by Virgil, as mother of Latinus, while others identified her with Circe. Her grove and temple were not only objects of great veneration to the people of the neighboring town of Minturnae, but appear to have enjoyed considerable celebrity with the Romans themselves. Immediately adjoining its mouth was an extensive marsh, formed probably by the stagnation of the river itself, and celebrated in history in connection with the adventures of Gaius Marius.

About 70 miles (110 km) upstream from its mouth, the river passes what used to be Lake Fucino, separated from the lake basin by the mountain ridge of Monte Salviano. The Roman emperor Claudius had a tunnel dug through the ridge in an attempt to drain the lake, which had no natural outlet, to the Liri. The later emperor Hadrian tried to improve the tunnel but, after the fall of the empire, tunnel maintenance was not maintained and it was blocked by silt and debris, allowing the lake to refill. A new tunnel was completed in the 1860s, and the basin of the former lake still drains to the Liri via that tunnel, through the ridge near the town of Avezzano. The river, in most tracts, matched the longest lived border in Europe from the 6th century a.d when it separated the Byzantine exclave of the duchy of Rome from the Lombard duchy of Benevento until 1860-61: the year of unification of Italy when the Papal states and the kingdom of the two Sicilies were the last sovereign countries to share this border.

During the Italian Campaign of the Second World War, the German defenses of the Gustav Line followed the Liri valley.
