= Antonia gens =

Ancient Roman family

Marcus Antonius, one of the most well known members of the gens.

The gens Antonia was a Roman family of great antiquity, with both patrician and plebeian branches. The first of the gens to achieve prominence was Titus Antonius Merenda, one of the second group of Decemviri called, in 450 BC, to help draft what became the Law of the Twelve Tables. The most prominent member of the gens was Marcus Antonius.

== Origin ==
Marcus Antonius, the triumvir, claimed that his gens was descended from Anton, a son of Heracles. According to ancient traditions the Antonii were Heracleidae and because of that Marcus Antonius harnessed lions to his chariot to commemorate his descent from Heracles, and many of his coins bore a lion for the same reason.

== Praenomina ==
The patrician Antonii used the praenomina Titus and Quintus. Titus does not appear to have been used by the plebeian Antonii, who instead used Quintus, Marcus, Lucius, and Gaius. There are also a few instances of Aulus, while Marcus Antonius the triumvir named one of his sons Iulus. This name, also borne by a later descendant of the triumvir, may have been an ancient praenomen revived by the family, but it was probably also intended to call to mind the connections of his family with the illustrious gens Julia.

== Branches and cognomina ==
The patrician Antonii bear the cognomen Merenda; the plebeian Antonii bear no surname under the Republic, with the exception of Quintus Antonius, propraetor in Sardinia in the time of Sulla, who is called Balbus on coins.

== Members ==
This list includes abbreviated praenomina. For an explanation of this practice, see filiation.

- Titus Antonius Merenda, Decemvir in 450 BC, defeated by the Aequi on Mount Algidus.
- Quintus Antonius T. f. Merenda, consular tribune in 422 BC.
- Marcus Antonius, magister equitum in 333 BC.
- Lucius Antonius, expelled from the Senate by the censors in 307 BC for divorcing his wife.
- Quintus Antonius, one of the officers in the fleet under the praetor Lucius Aemilius Regillus, in the war with Antiochus the Great, in 190 BC.
- Aulus Antonius, sent by the consul Lucius Aemilius Paullus, with two others to Perseus, after the defeat of the latter, in 168 BC.
- Marcus Antonius, tribune of the plebs in 167 BC, opposed the bill introduced by the praetor Marcus Juventius Thalna for declaring war against the Rhodians.
- Lucius Antonius, defended by Cato the Elder c. 150 BC.
- Gaius Antonius, 2nd-century BC moneyer, was for many years incorrectly assumed to have been the father of the orator and consul of 99 BC.
- Marcus Antonius M. f., father of Marcus Antonius the orator, may have been the son of Marcus Antonius, tribune of the plebs in 167 BC.
- Marcus Antonius M. f. M. n., the orator, praetor in 104 BC, consul in 99 BC, censor in 97 BC, put to death by Gaius Marius and Lucius Cornelius Cinna in 87 BC.
- Quintus Antonius Balbus, praetor in Sardinia in 82 BC, killed by Lucius Marcius Philippus, the legate of Sulla.
- Marcus Antonius, a proscribed senator who fled to Sertorius in Hispania during his revolt, and later conspired in his assassination in 73 BC.
- Marcus Antonius Gnipho, a distinguished rhetorician and tutor of Caesar.
- Marcus Antonius M. f. M. n., surnamed Creticus, praetor in 75 BC.
- Gaius Antonius M. f. M. n., surnamed Hybrida, consul in 63 BC.
- Antonia M. f. M. n., the daughter of Marcus Antonius the orator, was captured by pirates, and ransomed.
- Antonia M. f. M. n., wife of Publius Vatinius.
- Marcus Antonius M. f. M. n., the triumvir, was magister equitum in 47 and consul in 44 BC.
- Gaius Antonius M. f. M. n., praetor in 44 BC, was put to death by Brutus in 42.
- Lucius Antonius M. f. M. n., surnamed Pietas, consul in 41 BC.
- Antonia C. f. M. n. Hybrida Major, married Lucius Caninius Gallus.
- Antonia C. f. M. n. Hybrida Minor, married her cousin, Marcus Antonius, the triumvir, but was divorced from him in 47 B.C.
- Antonia M. f. M. n., daughter of the triumvir, who was betrothed to Marcus Aemilius Lepidus the younger.
- Marcus Antonius M. f. M. n., called Antyllus by the Greek writers, put to death by Augustus in 30 BC.
- Iulus Antonius M. f. M. n., consul in 10 BC, condemned to death by Augustus in 2 BC.
- Antonia M. f. M. n. Major, the wife of Lucius Domitius Ahenobarbus, was grandmother of the empress Messalina and the emperor Nero.
- Antonia M. f. M. n. Minor, the wife of Nero Claudius Drusus, was mother of the emperor Claudius, and grandmother of Caligula.
- Antonius Musa, a physician at the time of Augustus, and author of works on medicine and medicinal plants.
- Lucius Antonius Iuli f. M. n., exiled to Massilia in 2 BC.
- Iula Antonia Iuli f. M. n., daughter Iulus Antonius, the consul of 10 BC.
- Lucius Antonius Pedo, an eques who was praefectus of Roman Egypt around AD 11.
- Antonia Tryphaena, Queen of Thrace, and a granddaughter of Marcus Antonius, the triumvir.
- Antonius Atticus, a Roman rhetorician of the first century; he was contemporary with both Seneca and Quintilian.
- Aulus Antonius Rufus, consul suffectus in AD 45
- Marcus Antonius Felix, a freedman of the emperor Claudius, later procurator of Judaea.
- Marcus Antonius Pallas, a freedman, brother to Marcus Antonius Felix. Secretary first to Claudius, and then to Nero, who had him executed in AD 63.
- Antonia, wife of a Livius, perhaps a senator.
- Antonius Natalis, one of the conspirators of Gaius Calpurnius Piso against Nero.
- Marcus Antonius Julianus, procurator of Judaea from AD 66 to 70.
- Lucius Antonius Naso, tribune of the Praetorian Guard in AD 69, and procurator of Bithynia in the reign of Vespasian.
- Antonius Flamma, governor of Cyrenaica under Nero, banished at the beginning of Vespasian's reign for his extortion and cruelty.
- Antonius Novellus, one of Otho's principal generals, but possessed no influence with the soldiery.
- Antonius Castor, a botanist at Rome during the first century, who lived more than a hundred years.
- Antonius Rufus, a Latin grammarian, and perhaps also a playwright, in the time of Quintilian.
- Antonius, a Roman of high rank, and a contemporary and friend of Pliny the Younger, among whose letters there are three addressed to Antoninus. Pliny heaps the most extravagant praise upon his friend both for his personal character and his skill in composing Greek epigrams and iambics.
- Marcus Antonius L. f. Iuli n. Primus, the principal general of Vespasian, and consul in AD 69.
- Antonius Taurus, a tribune in the Praetorian Guard in AD 69.
- Marcus Antonius M. f. Agrippa, son of Marcus Antonius Felix, the procurator of Judaea, died in the eruption of Mount Vesuvius in AD 79.
- Antonia M. f. Clementiana, daughter of Marcus Antonius Felix.
- Lucius Antonius Saturninus, governor of Germania Superior, rebelled against the emperor Domitian in AD 91.
- Lucius Antonius Albus, consul in AD 102.
- Marcus Antonius Primus, camillus with the Arval Brethren in AD 118.
- Marcus Antonius Rufinus, consul in AD 131.
- Lucius Antonius L. f. Albus, consul suffectus around AD 132.
- Marcus Antonius Hiberus, consul ordinarius in 133.
- Antonius Diogenes, author of a Greek romance, who may have lived in the second century.
- Antonius, a notable herbalist mentioned by Galen, probably dated to the second century, but perhaps the same person as Antonius Castor.
- Antonius Julianus, a friend and contemporary of Aulus Gellius, and a teacher of grammar and oratory.
- Marcus Antonius Polemon, a celebrated sophist and rhetorician who flourished under Trajan, Hadrian, and Antoninus Pius.
- Julius Antonius Seleucus, governor of Moesia in the early 3rd century. Possibly the same figure as the contemporary usurper Seleucus, who revolted against Elagabalus. Other sources identify him with the consul Marcus Flavius Vitellius Seleucus.
- Marcus Antonius Sabinus, equestrian governor of Mauretania Caesariensis AD 215–217.
- Marcus Antonius Gordianus I, surnamed Africanus, emperor in AD 238.
- Marcus Antonius M. f. Gordianus II, emperor with his father in AD 238.
- Antonia M. f. Gordiana, daughter of the emperor Gordianus I, and mother of Gordianus III.
- Marcus Antonius Gordianus III, grandson of Gordianus I, and emperor from AD 238 to 244.
- Claudius Antonius, consul in AD 382.
- Rufius Antonius Agrypnius Volusianus, proconsul of Africa, praefectus urbi from AD 417 to 418, and praetorian prefect of Italy.

== See also ==
- List of Roman gentes
- Nerva-Antonine dynasty
