= Titus Antonius Merenda =

5th-century BC Roman politician and decemvir

Titus Antonius Merenda was a Roman politician, and decemvir from 450 to 449 BC.

== Family ==
He was part of the gens Antonia. It is possible that he was a plebeian, since the nomen Antonius is found among the plebeians more often than the patricians in this era. He was the father of Quintus Antonius Merenda, military tribune in 422 BC.

== Biography ==
Titus Antonius Merenda was one of the ten members of the Second Decemvirate, presided over by Appius Claudius Crassus and elected to draft the Law of the Twelve Tables, the first body of Roman law ever written. The Second Decemvirate seemed to be constituted equally by patricians and by plebeians, like Merenda. At the instigation of Crassus, the decemvirs maintained their power illegally for another year, refusing to proceed in the election of consuls.

In 449 BC, the Sabines occupied Eretum and the Aequi invaded and set up camp under Mount Algidus. The Roman troops were divided into two armies in order to fight on two fronts. Merenda received command of the army that fought the Aequi, with three other decemvirs: Lucius Minucius, Marcus Cornelius and Lucius Sergius. At the time, Crassus and Spurius Oppius Cornicen stayed in Rome to assist in the defense of the city, while the four other decemvirs fought the Sabines.

The two Roman armies were held in check on each front. The army commanded by Merenda withdrew to Tusculum before he was moved in reply to Lucius Verginius whose daughter had been made a slave by Crassus during a scandalous trial. In light of this, Lucius Verginius had been forced to kill his own daughter. His story provoked a mutiny among the soldiery who then chose ten military tribunes. Under their command, they returned to Rome and occupied the foot of the Aventine before joining with the other army by Monte Sacro. Under pressure by the soldiers and the plebeians, the decemvirs conceded. Crassus and Spurius Oppius Cornicen remained in Rome, and were imprisoned, but committed suicide during the process. The eight other decemvirs, including Merenda, were sent into exile.

== Bibliography ==
=== Ancient bibliography ===
- Livy, Ab urbe condita
- Dionysius of Halicarnassus, Roman Antiquities

=== Modern bibliography ===
- Broughton, T. Robert S. (1951), The American Philological Association (ed.), "The Magistrates of the Roman Republic", Philological Monographs, number XV, volume I, vol. I, 509 B.C. - 100 B.C., New York
- Cels-Saint-Hilaire, Janine (1995), La République des tribus: Du droit de vote et de ses enjeux aux débuts de la République romaine (495-300 av. J.-C.) (in French), Presses universitaires du Mirail, ISBN 2-85816-262-X
