= Marcus Cornelius Maluginensis =

5th-century Roman politician, general and decemvir

Marcus Cornelius Maluginensis was a Roman politician and member of the Second Decemvirate in 450 and 449 BC.

== Family ==
He was part of the Cornelii Maluginenses, patrician branch of the gens Cornelia. He was grandson of Servius Cornelius Maluginensis, consul in 485 BC. According to Livy, and Dionysius of Halicarnassus, he was the brother of Lucius Cornelius Maluginensis Uritus Cossus (consul in 459 BC) but his name would be the same as his father if we refer to the filiation given by the Fasti Capitolini.

== Biography ==
Marcus Cornelius Maluginensis was one of the ten members of the Second Decemvirate, presided over by Appius Claudius Crassus and elected for the purpose of drafting the Law of the Twelve Tables, first written law of the Roman Republic. At the instigation of Appius Claudius, the decemvirs illegally held onto power the following year, refusing to proceed with the election of consuls. That year, a war escalated with the Sabines who were based in Eretum and the Aequi camped under Mount Algidus. The Roman troops were divided into two armies so that they could fight on two fronts. Marcus Cornelius received the command of the army that fought the Aequi, with three other decemvirs; Lucius Minucius, Titus Antonius, and Lucius Sergius. Meanwhile, Appius Claudius and Spurius Oppius Cornicen remained in Rome to ensure the defence of the city, and the four other decemvirs fought against the Sabines.

The two Roman armies were kept in check on each front. The army commanded by Marcus Cornelius had withdrawn to Tusculum then moved in response to the call from Lucius Verginius, whose daughter had been enslaved by Appius Claudius. As a result of Appius Claudius' conduct during the ensuing trial, Lucius Verginius had decided to kill his own daughter. His story provoked a mutiny of the soldiers who elected twelve military tribunes. Under their command, they returned to Rome and set up camp on the Aventine and were then joined by the other Roman army that was led by Appius Claudius and Spurius Oppius Cornicen. Appius Claudius and Spurius Oppius Cornicen were imprisoned in Rome, but committed suicide during their prosecution. The eight other decemvirs, including Marcus Cornelius Maluginensis, were exiled.

== Bibliography ==
=== Ancient bibliography ===
- Livy, Ab urbe condita
- Dionysius of Halicarnassus, Roman Antiquities

=== Modern bibliography ===
- Broughton, T. Robert S. (1951), The American Philological Association (ed.), "The Magistrates of the Roman Republic", Philological Monographs, number XV, volume I, vol. I, 509 B.C. - 100 B.C., New York
- Cels-Saint-Hilaire, Janine (1995), La République des tribus: Du droit de vote et de ses enjeux aux débuts de la République romaine (495-300 av. J.-C.) (in French), Presses universitaires du Mirail, ISBN 2-85816-262-X
