= Lucius Sergius Esquilinus =

5th-century BC Roman politician and decemvir

Lucius Sergius Esquilinus was a Roman politician, and member of the Second Decemvirate in 450 and 449 BC.

== Family ==
He was a member of the Sergii Esquilini, patrician branch of the gens Sergia. His praenomen is not reported in the Fasti Capitolini, and ancient authors disagree on what it is. Livy gives Marcus then Lucius, Diodorus Siculus mentions a Caius and Dionysius of Halicarnassus, a Marcus.

== Biography ==
Lucius Sergius Esquilinus was one of the ten members of the second decemvirate, presided over by Appius Claudius Sabinus and elected for the writing of the Twelve Tables, first body of written law protecting Roman rights. At the instigation of Sabinus, the decemvirs had maintained their power illegally the following year, refusing to proceed in the election of consuls.

That year, the Sabines' occupied Eretum, while the Aequi were camped on Mount Algidus. Roman troops were divided into two armies so they could fight on two fronts. Esquilinus received command of the army opposing the Aequi, with three other decemvirs, Lucius Minucius, Marcus Cornelius Maluginensis, and Titus Antonius Merenda. Meanwhile, Sabinus and Spurius Oppius Cornicen stayed in Rome to assure the defense of the city, and four other decemvirs went against the Sabines.

The two Roman armies were held in check on each front. The army commanded by Esquilinus withdrew to Tusculum then answered the call of Lucius Verginius whose daughter had been reduced to slavery by Sabinus during one of his scandalous trials. After that infamous trial, Verginius had been forced to kill his own daughter. His story provoked the mutiny of the soldiers who elected the ten military tribunes. Under their command, they headed back toward Rome and settled on the Aventine then joined with the other army on Monte Sacro. Under pressure by the soldiers and the plebeians, the decemvirs resigned. Appius Claudius Sabinus and Spurius Oppius Cornicen stayed in Rome and were imprisoned, but committed suicide before their trial. The other eight decemvirs, including Esquilinus, left in exile.

== Bibliography ==
=== Ancient bibliography ===
- Livy, Ab urbe condita
- Dionysius of Halicarnassus, Roman Antiquities

=== Modern bibliography ===
- Broughton, T. Robert S. (1951), The American Philological Association (ed.), "The Magistrates of the Roman Republic", Philological Monographs, number XV, volume I, vol. I, 509 B.C. - 100 B.C., New York
- (in French) Cels-Saint-Hilaire, Janine (1995), "La République des tribus: Du droit de vote et de ses enjeux aux débuts de la République romaine (495-300 av. J.-C.)", in Presses universitaires du Mirail (ed.), Tempus, ISBN 2-85816-262-X
