= Quintus Poetelius Libo Visolus =

5th-century BC Roman politician and decemvir

Quintus Poetelius Libo Visolus was a Roman politician, and member of the Second Decemvirate in 450 and 449 BC.

== Family ==
He was a part of the gens Poetelia. According to Dionysius of Halicarnassus, he was plebeian.

== Biography ==
Quintus Poetelius Libo Visolus was one of the ten members of the Second Decemvirate, presided over by Appius Claudius and elected in order to draft the Law of the Twelve Tables, first body of written law in the Roman Republic. The Second Decemvirate was made up of just as many plebeians, like Quintus Poetelius, as it was by patricians. At the instigation of Appius Claudius, the decemvirs held on to power the following year and refused to allow the annual election of consuls in 449 BC.

In 449 BC, a war escalated with the Sabines who established themselves in Eretum and the Aequi who had camped on Mount Algidus. Roman forces were divided into two armies in order to fight on two fronts. Quintus Poetelius received command of the army which fought the Sabines, with three other decemvirs: Quintus Fabius Vibulanus, Manius Rabuleius, and Kaeso Duillius. At the time, Appius Claudius and Spurius Oppius Cornicen remained in Rome in order to ensure the defence of the city, while the other four decemvirs fought against the Aequi.

The two Roman armies were each kept in check on both fronts. The army commanded by Quintus Poetelius withdrew to Fidenae and Crustumerium then returned to the field after the death of Lucius Siccius Dentatus, former tribune of the plebs and staunch opponent of the patricians. His death was concealed as though it were a loss suffered in an ambush. The soldiers then mutinied and elected ten military tribunes to command the army. They returned to Rome and camped on the Aventine before merging with the other army on Monte Sacro. Under pressure from the soldiers and the plebeians, the decemvirs resigned. Appius Claudius Crassus and Spurius Oppius Cornicen remained in Rome and were imprisoned, but committed suicide during their trial. The other eight decemvirs, such as Quintus Poetelius, left Rome and went into exile.

== Bibliography ==
=== Ancient bibliography ===
- Livy, Ab urbe condita
- Dionysius of Halicarnassus, Roman Antiquities

=== Modern bibliography ===
- Broughton, T. Robert S. (1951), The American Philological Association (ed.), "The Magistrates of the Roman Republic", Philological Monographs, number XV, volume I, vol. I, 509 B.C. - 100 B.C., New York
- Cels-Saint-Hilaire, Janine (1995), La République des tribus: Du droit de vote et de ses enjeux aux débuts de la République romaine (495-300 av. J.-C. (in French), Presses universitaires du Mirail, ISBN 2-85816-262-X
