= Duilia gens =

Ancient Roman family

The gens Duilia or Duillia was a plebeian family at ancient Rome. The first of the gens to achieve prominence was Marcus Duilius, tribune of the plebs in BC 470. The family produced several important statesmen over the first three centuries of the Republic, before fading into obscurity.

== Origin ==
The plebeian character of this gens is attested by the fact of Marcus Duilius being tribune of the plebs in BC 470, and further by the statement of Dionysius, who expressly says, that the decemvir Caeso Duilius and two of his colleagues were plebeians. In Livius we indeed read, that all of the decemvirs had been patricians; but this must be regarded as a mere hasty assertion which Livius puts into the mouth of the tribune Canuleius, for Livius himself in another passage expressly states, that Gaius Duilius, the military tribune, was a plebeian.

== Praenomina used ==
The praenomina used by the Duilii included Marcus, Caeso, and Gaius.

== Branches and cognomina ==
The only cognomen that occurs in this gens is Longus.

== Members ==
This list includes abbreviated praenomina. For an explanation of this practice, see filiation.

- Marcus Duilius, tribune of the plebs in BC 470. The following year, he and his colleague, Gaius Sicinius, summoned Appius Claudius Sabinus, who had been consul in 471, before the assembly of the people, for the violent opposition he made to the agrarian law of Spurius Cassius. During the unrest at the time of the decemvirate, Duilius served as one of the champions of the plebeians, and helped restore order to the Roman state, with moderation and wisdom.
- Caeso Duilius Longus, elected one of the decemvirs for 450. During the war with the Aequi and Sabines, he and four of his colleagues were sent against the Aequi at Mount Algidus. After the fall of the decemvirate, Duilius voluntarily went into exile, and his property was publicly sold by the quaestors.
- Caeso Duilius K. f. Longus, father of the consular tribune of BC 399.
- Gaius Duilius K. f. K. n. Longus, consular tribune in BC 399, with five colleagues.
- Marcus Duilius, tribune of the plebs in BC 357, in which year he and his colleague, Lucius Maenius, carried a rogation de unciario foenore, and another which prevented the irregular proceedings in the camps of the soldiers, such as the enactment of a law by the soldiers out of Rome, on the proposal of a consul.
- Gaius Duilius, appointed one of the quinqueviri mensarii for the liquidation of debts, by the consuls of BC 352. He and his colleague conducted their business with such skill and moderation, that they gained the gratitude of all parties.
- Caeso Duilius, consul in BC 336, and two years later triumvir for the purpose of conducting a colony to Cales, a town of the Ausones, against which a war had been carried on during his consulship, and which had been reduced the year after.
- Marcus Duilus, grandfather of the consul of BC 260.
- Marcus Duilius M. f., father of the consul of BC 260.
- Gaius Duilius M. f. M. n., consul in BC 260, during the First Punic War. He had command of the newly built Roman fleet, and devised the strategy of using grappling irons to draw the enemy's ships close enough for hand-to-hand combat. He won several important victory, and ensured the support of various allies. On his return to Rome, he celebrated a splendid triumph. He was censor in 258, and in 231 he served as dictator for the purpose of holding the comitia.

== See also ==
- List of Roman gentes
