= Longus (disambiguation) =

Longus was a Greek writer in the 2nd century AD.

Longus may also refer to:

== Roman Consuls ==
- Manius Tullius Longus (500 BC), Roman consul in 500 BC, served with Servius Sulpicius Camerinus Cornutus
- Caeso Duillius Longus (450 BC), a Roman consul from 450 to 449 BC
- Gaius Duillius Longus (399 BC), a consular tribune in 399 BC serving with 5 others
- Quintus Sulpicius Longus (390 BC), a consular tribune in 390 BC serving with 5 others
- Gaius Sulpicius Longus (337 BC), Roman consul in 337, 323, 314 BC and dictator in 312 BC
- Lucius Manlius Vulso Longus (256 BC), consul in 256 and 250 BC
- Tiberius Sempronius Longus (consul 218 BC) (c. 260), consul in 218 BC, served with Publius Cornelius Scipio
- Tiberius Sempronius Longus (consul 194 BC), son of Ti. Sempronius Longus (218), consul in 194 BC, served with Publius Cornelius Scipio Africanus
- Lucilius Longus (1st century AD), consul in July, 7 AD, friend of Tiberius
- Lucius Marcius Celer Marcus Calpurnius Longus (144 AD), consul in October, 144 AD

== Other People ==
- Edward von Lõngus, pseudonym for Estonian stencil artist
- Thor Longus (12th century), or Thor the Long, Anglo-Saxon noble
- Velius Longus (2nd century AD), Latin grammarian
- Publius Servilius Casca Longus (d. 42 BC), assassin of Julius Caesar
- Saxo cognomine Longus (1150-1220), Danish historian, author, and theologin
