= Kaeso =

Kaeso may refer to:

- Kaeso (praenomen) or Caeso (abbreviated K.), an ancient Roman naming convention

Some of those who bore the name are:

- Caeso Fabius Vibulanus (consul), consul 484, 481?, 479 BC
- Caeso Quinctius, son of Lucius Quinctius Cincinnatus
- Kaeso Duillius Longus, decemvir 450–449 BC

== In fiction ==
- Kaeso Fabius, character in 'Roma' by Steven Saylor, pp. 283-338

== See also ==
- Praenomen
