= Caeso Duillius Longus =

Roman politician

Caeso Duillius Longus was a Roman politician, a member of the Second Decemvirate in 450 and 449 BC.

== Family ==
Caeso or Kaeso was an uncommon Roman first name (praenomen) used by the Duilia family (gens). The epithet (agnomen) or surname (cognomen) of Longus is usually given to this figure but is uncertain.

== Life ==
According to Dionysius of Halicarnassus, Caeso Duillius was plebeian but he was selected as one of the ten members of the Second Decemvirate, presided over by Appius Claudius Crassus and elected for the purpose of creating the Law of the Twelve Tables, the first body of written law in Roman history. At the instigation of Sabinus, the decemvirs held onto their titles illegally the following year, and refused to proceed with the annual election of consuls.

In 449 BC, a war escalated with the Sabines setting up in Eretum and the Aequi who had camped on Mount Algidus. Roman forces were divided into two armies in order to fight on two fronts. Duillius received command of the army which fought the Sabines, with three other decemvirs; Quintus Fabius Vibulanus, Manius Rabuleius, and Quintus Poetelius. At the time, Crassus and Spurius Oppius Cornicen remained in Rome in order to assure the defense of the city, while the other four decemvirs fought against the Aequi.

The two Roman armies were each kept in check on both fronts. The army commanded by Duillius withdrew to Fidenae and Crustumerium then returned to the field after the death of the soldier Lucius Siccius Dentatus, former tribune of the plebs and staunch opponent of the patricians. His death was concealed as though it were a loss suffered in an ambush. The soldiers then mutinied and elected ten military tribunes to command the army. They then returned to Rome and set up on the Aventine before merging with the other army on Monte Sacro. Under pressure by the soldiers and the plebeians, the decemvirs resigned. Appius Claudius Crassus and Spurius Oppius Cornicen remained in Rome and were imprisoned, but committed suicide during their trial. The other eight decemvirs, including Duillius, went into exile.
