= The Death of Virginia =

1828 painting by Guillaume Guillon-Lethière

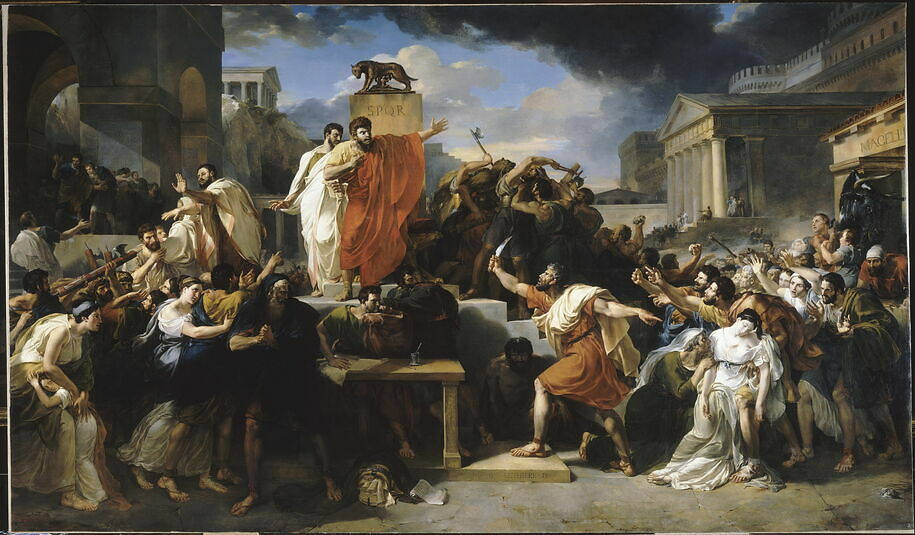
- Artist: Guillaume Guillon-Lethière
- Year: 1828
- Type: Oil on canvas, history painting
- Dimensions: 198.1 cm × 246.4 cm (78.0 in × 97.0 in)
- Location: Louvre, Paris

The Death of Virginia (French: La Mort de Virginie) is an 1828 neoclassical history painting by the French artist Guillaume Guillon-Lethière. Set during the Roman Republic. It depicts the death of Verginia, in the Roman Forum during the 5th century BC. The painting is based on the writings of the later Roman historian Livy in his History of Rome .

== History ==
Guillon-Lethière worked on the painting beginning in 1825 and finishing in 1828. The painting was then was exhibited at the Salon of 1831 at the Louvre. On June 12,1848 the piece was donated to the Louvre by M. Boyard, Edouard. A highly finished oil sketch is now in the Getty Museum in California.

== Subject Matter ==
The Death of Virginia depicts the death of Verginia (Virginia), a female heroine from Ancient Rome depicted in the Roman historian Livy's History of Rome. Guillon-Lethière's depiction places Verginia, in a death swoon, in the lower-right of the painting. Her father points to her while brandishing the dagger he used to kill her at the corrupt decemvir. The decemvir gestures towards the scene below him defensively. In the background, the crowd angrily protests.

== The Story of Verginia ==
In the Roman historian Livy's History of Rome, Verginia is the maiden daughter of the Roman centurion Lucius Verginius. In 447 B.C.E. the republican constitution was suspended, and in its place 10 commissioners known as the decemvir were appointed to codify Roman laws. A year later in 448 B.C.E. when the decemvir's tenure expired, they refused to relinquish control. In 449 B.C.E. a member of the decemvir Appius Claudius Crassus Inregillensis Sabinus lusts after Verginia. When Verginia refuses Sabinus's advances, Sabinus directs a subordinate of his to claim that Verginia is not a freeborn citizen, but a slave, so that he may have her. When the news reached Verginia's father he rushed home and stabbed Verginia, killing her in order to save her and their family's honor. Verginia's death shows the public Appius Claudius Crassus Inregillensis Sabinus's nature and leads to an uprising and the eventual disposal of the decemvir.

== Bibliography ==
- Tahinci, Anna & Wolohojian, Stephan. A Private Passion: 19th-century Paintings and Drawings from the Grenville L. Winthop Collection, Harvard University, 2003.
