= Jean-Louis Gintrac =

French painter, designer, and lithographer

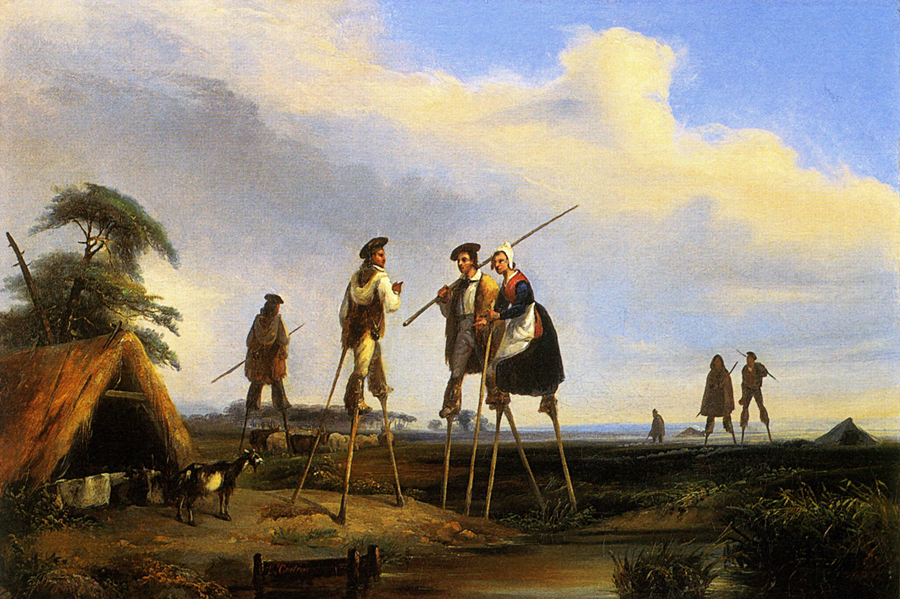
The Stilted Shepherds of Landes

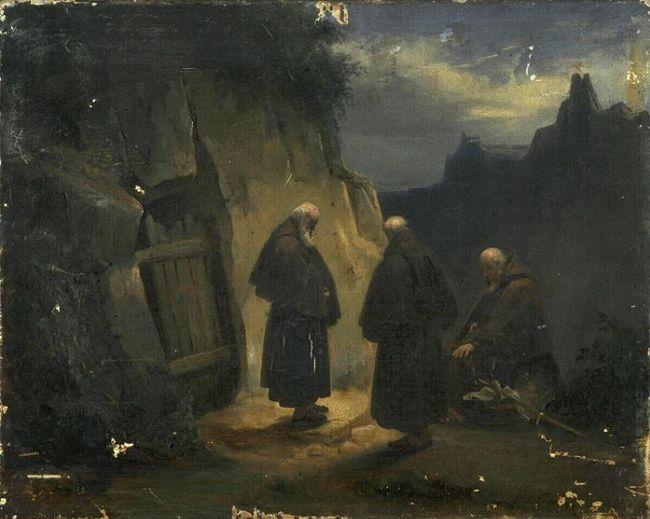
Monks Investigating

Jean-Louis Gintrac (7 November 1808, Bordeaux - 20 July 1886, Bordeaux) was a French painter, designer, and lithographer.

== Biography ==
He was the youngest child in a family of five boys. After studying with Jean-Paul Alaux, he went to Paris.

There, by a recommendation from Jacques Arago, he joined the atelier of Guillaume Guillon Lethière. In 1830, he left to become a student at the Beaux-Arts de Paris. He exhibited at the Salon from 1831 to 1837, then returned to Bordeaux. At first, he painted historical scenes and portraits, in oils and pastels. Later, he specialized in landscapes and genre scenes.

He drew numerous monuments for the "Commission of Historic Monuments" of Gironde, and provided drawings for newspapers. He also had several students. His close associates included the painters Carle Vernet and Pierre Lacour, and the Mayor of Bordeaux, Alexandre de Bethmann.

In 1846, he took a two-month trip with Bethmann; crossing Southern France to Marseille. From there, they sailed to Civitavecchia; touring most of the eastern side of the Italian Peninsula.

From 1850 until the mid-1860s, he was a regular exhibitor at the Bordeaux Salon, although his output declined after 1853, when he chose to devote more time to his family.

He died suddenly in 1886, aged seventy-seven.
