= The Oath of the Ancestors =

Painting by Guillaume Guillon Lethière

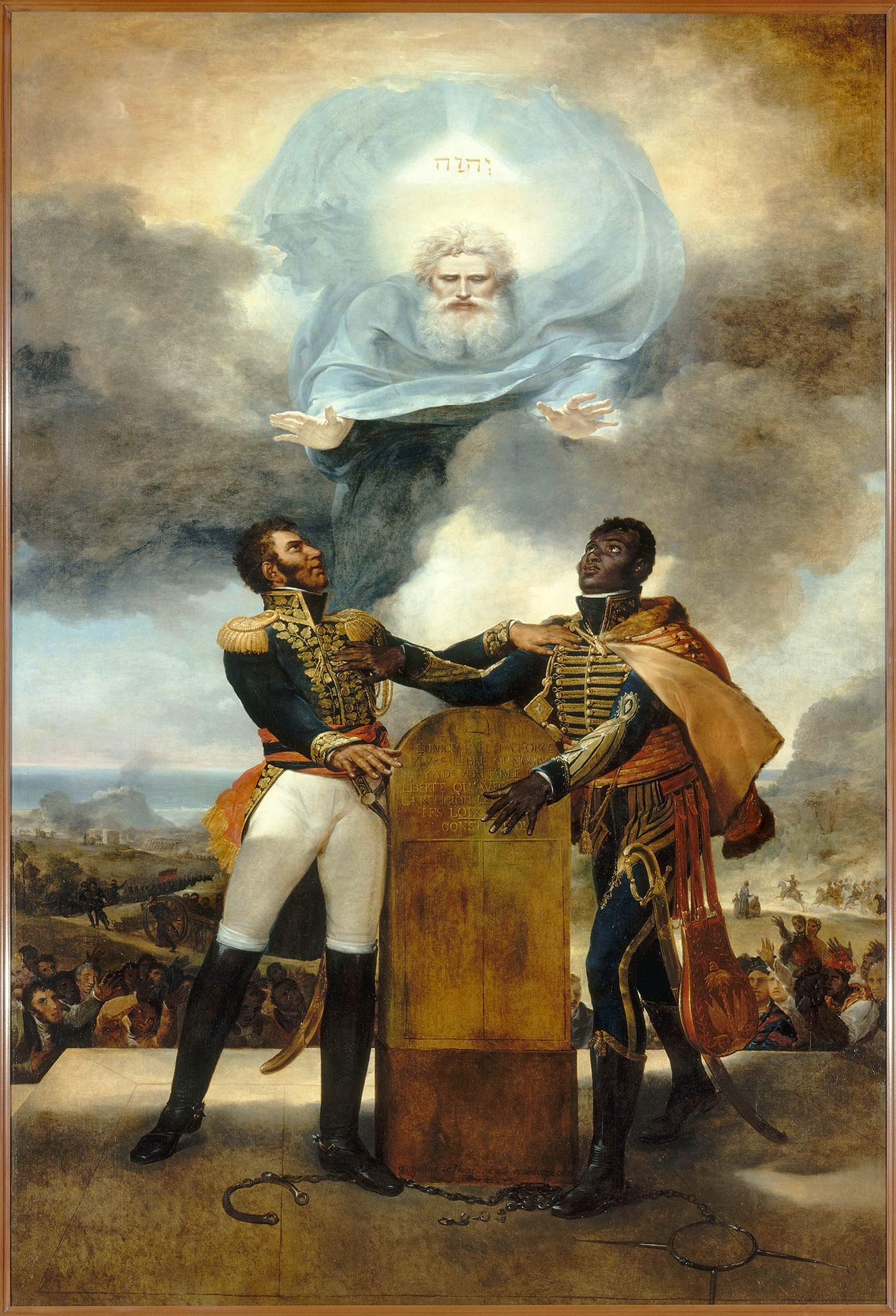
- Artist: Guillaume Guillon-Lethière
- Year: 1822
- Medium: oil on canvas
- Dimensions: 400 cm × 300 cm (160 in × 120 in)
- Location: Musée du Panthéon National Haïtien, Port-au-Prince

The Oath of the Ancestors (Le Serment des ancêtres) is an 1822 oil-on-canvas painting by French Neoclassical artist Guillaume Guillon-Lethière. The painting depicts two of Haiti’s founding revolutionaries, mixed-race general Alexandre Pétion and Black general Jean-Jacques Dessalines at a decisive moment in the Haitian Revolution. The two generals are seen forming an alliance in 1802 to oust French forces from the island. The men are seen looking up to a God-like figure above them as chaos ensues in the background.

Lethière made this painting to celebrate the birth of the nation of Haiti and acknowledge his racial identity as a mixed-race French man of Caribbean descent. Lethière gave the painting to the Haitian government in 1823, recognizing the country's fight for independence. The painting was found in the ruins of the presidential palace in the Haitian capital following the 2010 Haiti earthquake and was restored by the Louvre. Currently, it is held by the Musée du Panthéon National Haïtien in Port-au-Prince, Haiti.

== Context ==
Lethière was born in Guadeloupe to Marie-Françoise Pepeye, a free person of color, and Pierre Guillon, a French Royal Notary. A member of the elite class of people of color living in France, Lethière was a well respected and successful painter. However, Lethière had been confronted with the reality of his Creole past as a mixed-race man living in France when the right to have Guillon included in his name was legally contested in 1819 by a man who said Lethière was born out of adultery, making him an illegitimate son of Guillon. Lethière created this painting towards the end of his life to align himself with and celebrate the Black and mulatto revolutionaries in Haiti who bravely came together to fight against French forces.

== Composition and analysis ==
The painting depicts two Haitian revolutionary leaders, Jean-Jacques Dessalines, a formerly enslaved man, and Alexandre Pétion, a mixed-race officer, holding onto each other as they look up to a God-like white skin figure in the sky. This gesture symbolizes solidarity and cooperation between different racial groups in the fight for Haiti’s independence. The two men are standing on top of chains to symbolize the ending of slavery in Haiti, which was, according to the painting, accomplished due to the bravery of Pètion, Dessalines, and the soldiers in the background.

Though this painting represents the freedom of people of color due to their own resilience, Lethière still positions them under the authority of a "white father". Lethière made this painting as a gift to the Haitians as a recognition of all they went through at the hands of white men, but some scholars argue that the large white, God-like figure sends a message that a white, patriarchal figure still presides over the new nation. This divine figure stands as a reminder that Haitian independence, despite its success, remains incomplete without acknowledgment from France, the "white father" figure.

Other scholars say Lethière included the divine figure above the men with their eyes pointed towards heaven because Toussaint L'Ouverture, the most prominent leader in the Haitian Revolution, proclaimed The Haitian Constitution of 1801, the island's first constitution. The constitution banned slavery and was attributed by L'Ouverture to the protection of a divine figure in a speech where he stated that Haitians should thank God for the gift of freedom. This may be why Lethière depicts the men listening to, and repeating, an oath from the God figure, which appears to be inscribed on the stela between them. From what is visible, the inscription reads, "Freedom, Religion, Laws, Constitution", "Live free or die", and "Strength through unity".

Additionally, for the first time in his professional career, Lethière added text following his signature, perhaps as a form of protest and as an acknowledgment of his identity, saying: "Born in Guadeloupe. Year 1760."

== Location history ==
In contrast with Lethière's previous paintings, which were meant for a French audience, The Oath of the Ancestors was specifically made for the people of Haiti. Delivered secretly by Lethière's son to the President of Haiti, Jean-Pierre Boyer, the painting acts as a personal and political gesture of solidarity with Haiti's independence.

However, the heroism with which Lethière depicted Dessalines did not align with popular opinion in Haiti. The people of Haiti, including President Boyer, knew Dessalines as a ruthless, genocidal leader. Boyer did not want to hang a "work that recognized Dessalines as an ancestor and founder of the nation equal to Pétion" in a government building, so he hung it in the Port-au-Prince Cathedral.

The painting was moved from the cathedral to the Palais de l'Indépendance, a museum dedicated to the nation's history, in 1904.

In 1918, Bishop Jean-Marie Jan reclaimed the painting for a newly constructed cathedral in Port-au-Prince, where it was placed behind the main altar. After 73 years in a hot and humid environment, the painting was taken by Gèrard-Florent Laballe and Geneviève Capy to be restored in France. The painting was successfully restored in 1995 and was exhibited in France and Guadeloupe before returning to the Presidential Palace in Haiti in 1998.

In 2010, an 7.0 magnitude earthquake struck the island of Haiti, leaving Lethière's painting in extremely poor condition, but not destroyed; it was pieced back together with tape. The painting was sent to the Louvre to be restored and has since been returned to Haiti. The painting currently is held in the Musée du Panthéon National Haïtien in Port-au-Prince, Haiti.

== Influences ==
=== Jacques-Louis David ===
There are many parallels between Lethière's painting and Jacques-Louis David's unfinished work Oath of the Tennis Court, which depicts a pivotal moment in the French Revolution. Both paintings represent a turbulent point in their respective countries' histories and evoke a sense of brotherhood as men rise up to fight the oppressive powers of their governments. Additionally, the drapery flowing in the wind in David's work parallels the wind blowing through Dessalines's cape.

Additionally, in David's Oath of the Horatii, the brothers unite by responding to the patriarch who commands them in a manner that loosely parallels the interaction between men and the God figure in Lethiére's work.

Jacque-Louis David, The Oath of the Tennis Court, 1791 (never finished)

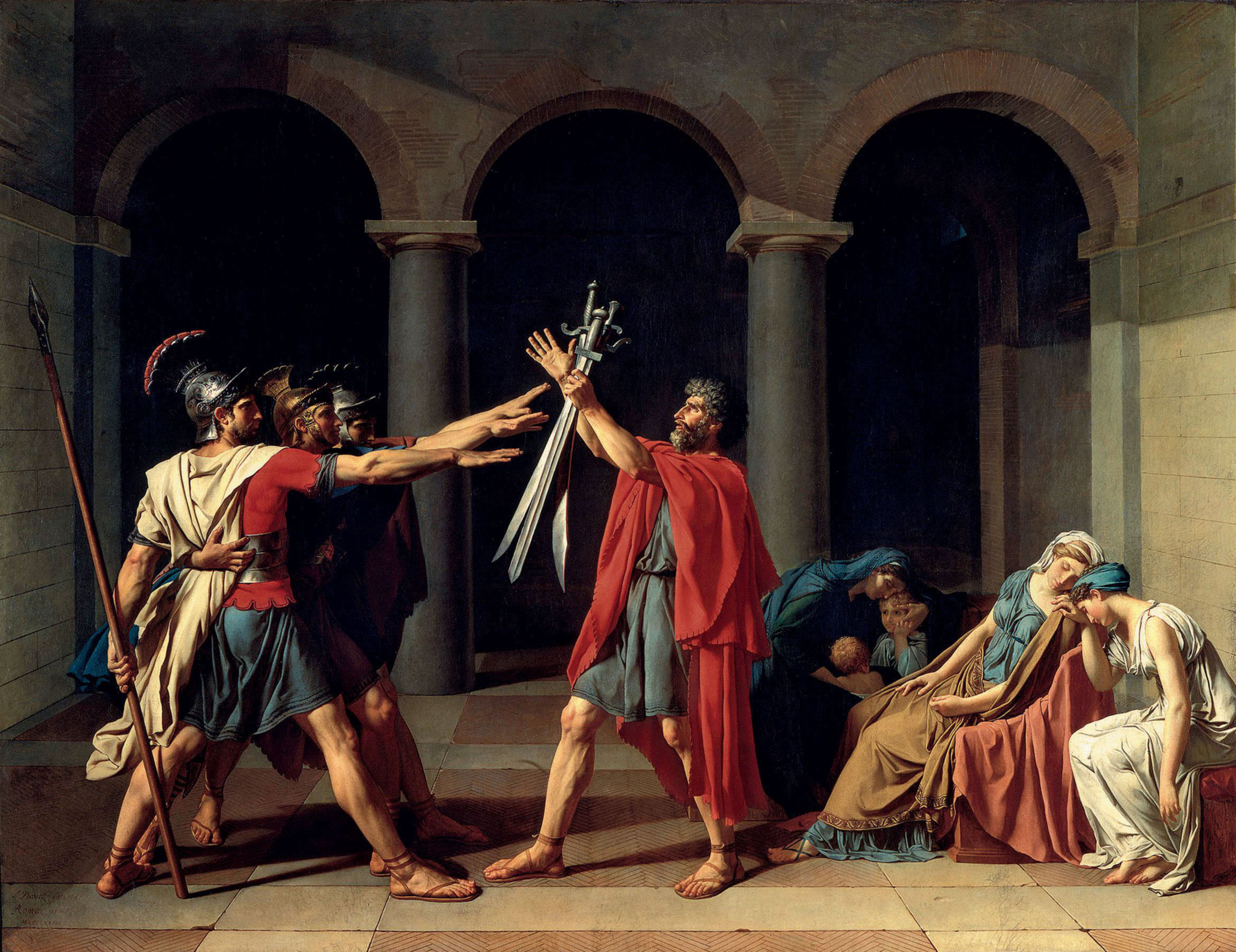
Jacques-Louis David, The Oath of the Horatii, 1785
