= Homer Singing His Iliad at the Gates of Athens =

Guillaume Guillon-Lethière

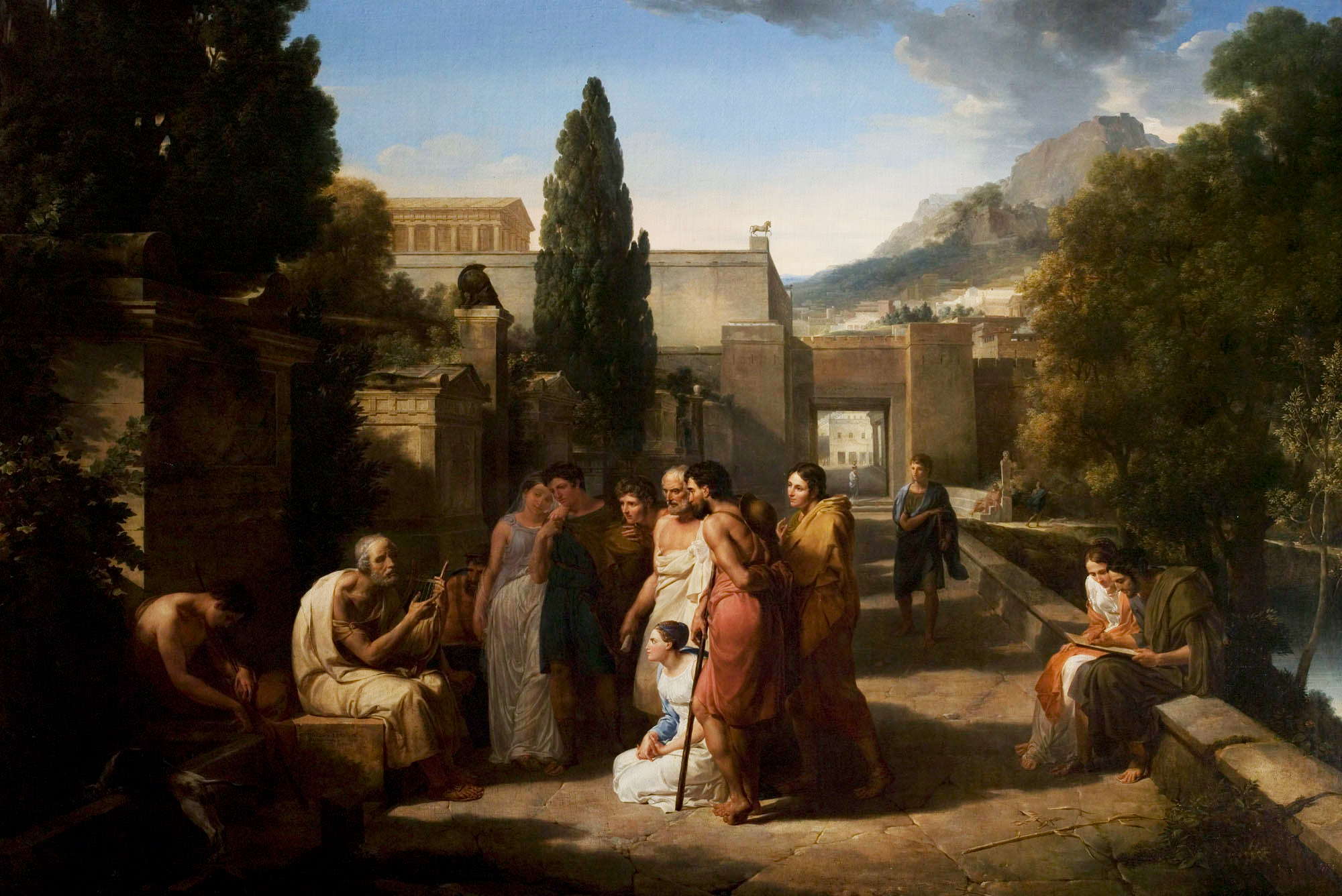
- Artist: Guillaume Guillon-Lethière
- Year: 1811
- Type: Oil on canvas, history painting
- Dimensions: 198.1 cm × 246.4 cm (78.0 in × 97.0 in)
- Location: Nottingham Castle; Nottingham

Homer Singing His Iliad at the Gate of Athens is an 1811 history painting by the French artist Guillaume Guillon-Lethière. It depicts the Ancient Greek poet Homer singing verses of his Iliad to crowds close to the gates of Athens. Mount Olympus can be seen in the distance.

Guillon-Lethière was part of the Neoclassical tradition associated with Jacques-Louis David and the French Revolution. The work may have been displayed at the Salon of 1812 at the Louvre in Paris, the final edition to held during the rule of Napoleon. It was sold by the artist in Rome, where he had been working, to an English traveller in 1815. It was exhibited the following year at the Egyptian Hall in London's Piccadilly. Today the painting is in the collection of Nottingham Castle in England having been acquired in 1884.

== Bibliography ==
- Kushigan, Nancy. Pictures and Fictions: Visual Modernism and the Pre-war Novels of D.H. Lawrence. P. Lang, 1990.
- Lovatt, Helen & Vout Caroline. Epic Visions: Visuality in Greek and Latin Epic and Its Reception. Cambridge University Press, 2013.
