= Rimane =

Rimane is a surname. Notable people with the name include:

- Davy Rimane (born 1979), member of the National Assembly of France for French Guiana's 2nd constituency (2022–present)
- Juliana Rimane (born 1959), former member of the National Assembly of France for French Guiana's 2nd constituency (2002–2007)
- Kévin Rimane (born 1991), French Guianan professional footballer
