= Antonius Atticus =

Roman rhetorician

Antonius Atticus was a rhetorician of ancient Rome who lived in the age of Seneca the Elder and Quintilian.
