= Guillaume Guillon-Lethière =

French painter (1760–1832)

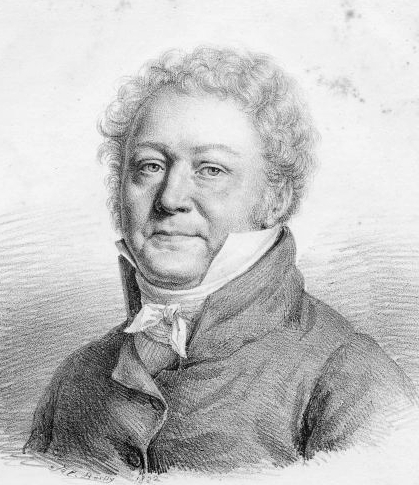
- Portrait by Julien-Léopold Boilly, 1822
- Born: 10 January 1760; Sainte-Anne, Guadeloupe
- Died: 21 April 1832 (aged 72); Paris, France
- Movement: Neoclassicism
- Awards: Prix de Rome, Second Grand Prize
- Patrons: Jean-Baptiste Descamps, Gabriel-François Doyen

Signature
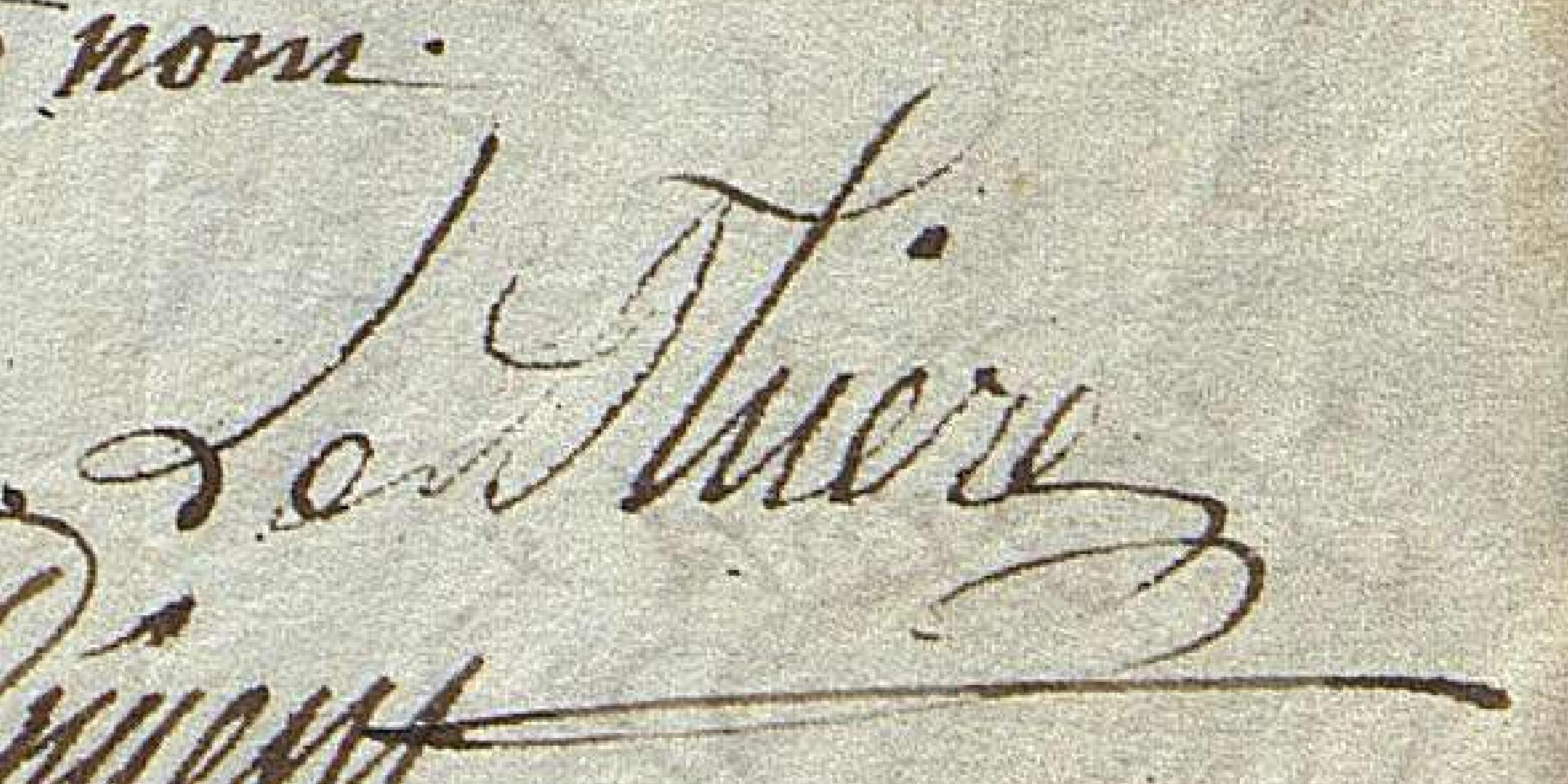

Guillaume Guillon-Lethière (French: [gijom gijɔ̃ lətjɛʁ]; 10 January 1760 – 21 April 1832) was a French painter. Lethière was an artist of the neoclassical style specializing in history paintings and one of the first notable artist of colour in France at the time.

== Life ==
=== Youth ===
He was born in Sainte-Anne, Guadeloupe, out of wedlock, to Marie-Françoise Dupepaye, a free person of color, and Pierre Guillon, a colonial Royal Notary. He was the third child in the family which is reflected in his name, Lethière, a corruption of “le tiers,” or “the third”. He and his sister, Andrèze, could not be legally recognized as Guillon's children until 1794, when the Code Noir was abolished.

In 1774, after displaying an early aptitude for art, his father took him to France, where he was placed with the painter Jean-Baptiste Descamps, at the new free drawing school in Rouen. It was there that he adopted the name "Lethière", derived from "letier" (third, as in "third son"). He remained there for three years, then went to Paris and became a student of Gabriel François Doyen at the Académie royale de peinture et de sculpture. Those studies lasted until 1786. During that time, he paid frequent visits to the studio of Jacques-Louis David.

=== Adulthood ===
He won second place in the Prix de Rome of 1784. Two years later, he entered again and won receiving support to travel to Rome, where he further developed his Neoclassical style and stayed from 1786 to 1791. In 1787, he too had a son out of wedlock, with a woman named Marie-Agathe Lapôtre. In 1792, he returned to Paris and opened his own painting studio in the Saint-Germain-des-Prés district. He held his first exhibit at the Salon in 1795, with paintings he had created in Rome.

=== Later years ===
In 1799, he married the widow Marie-Joseph-Honorée Vanzenne. She can be seen in his portraiture Woman Leaning on a Portfolio. A daughter from her first marriage, Eugénie, would also become a painter. The following year, he accompanied the newly appointed Ambassador, Lucien Bonaparte, to Spain, where he helped him build an art collection. Through Bonaparte's recommendation, he was appointed Director of the French Academy in Rome in 1807.

==== Return to France ====
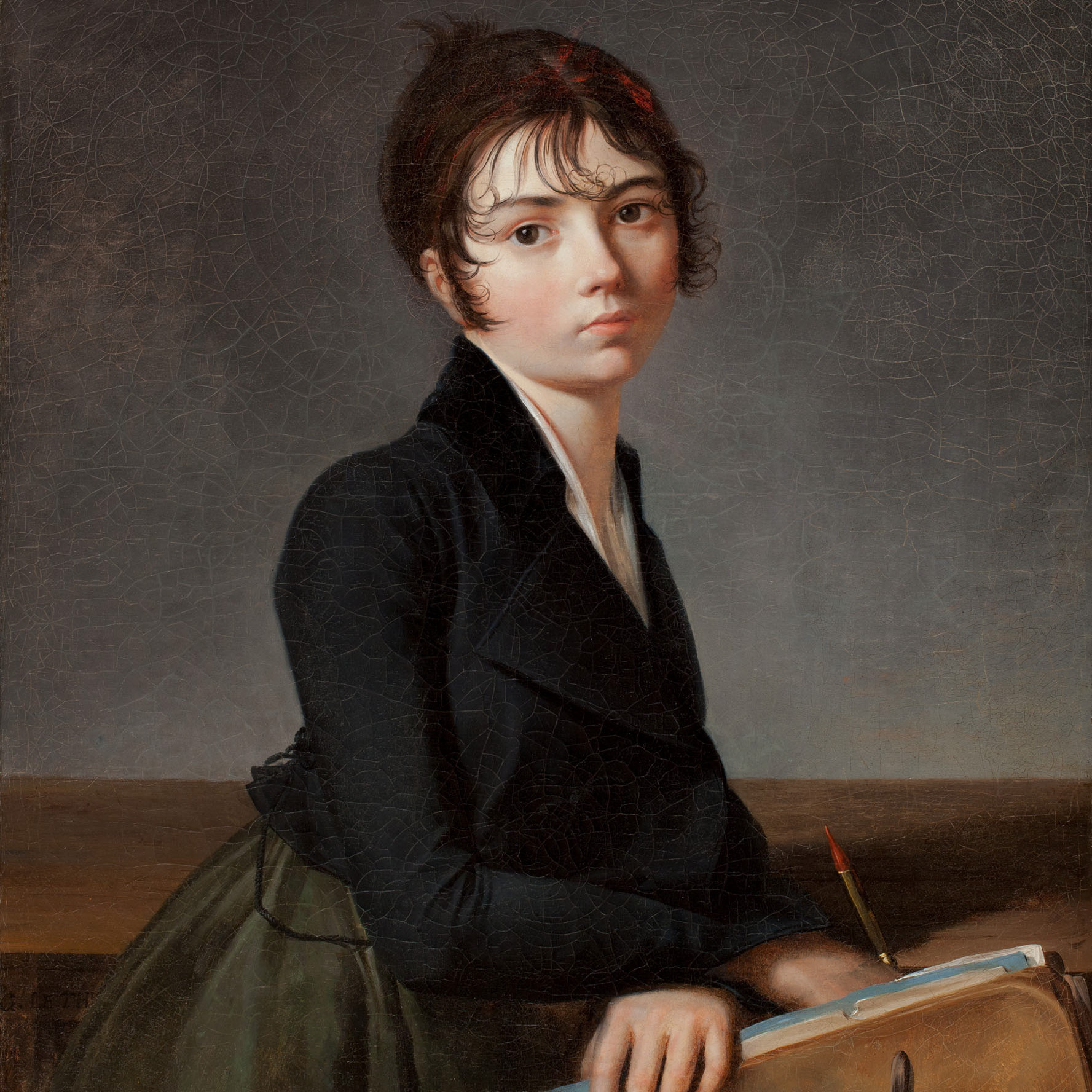
Woman Leaning on a Portfolio, Guillaume Lethière, 1799, Worcester Art Museum

Lethière returned to Paris in 1792, where he undertook artistic production for a decade – a critical success. However, there were many societal transformations that came with this period, notably the execution of the king and queen of France, and the abolition of the monarchy. Despite the political turmoil, Lethière established a studio in Paris and became one of the most renowned artists of the time. He created Erminia and the Shepherds (Dallas Museum of Art), a love story during the Renaissance and the Middle Ages. There was also the Frieze Representing the Neuf Thermidor (Musée d’art et d’histoire), which was exhibited at the Salon of 1798, and Woman Leaning on a Portfolio (Worcester Art Museum), which was exhibited at the Salon of 1799. The latter is more personal, depicting his stepdaughter Eugénie, whom he personally trained. The prominence of the artist is depicted in Louis-Léopold Boilly’s portrait Meeting of Artists in Isabey’s Studio (Musée du Louvre), where Lethière can be seen wearing a red cloak near the center. Along with his artistic success, he was legally recognized by his father in 1799.

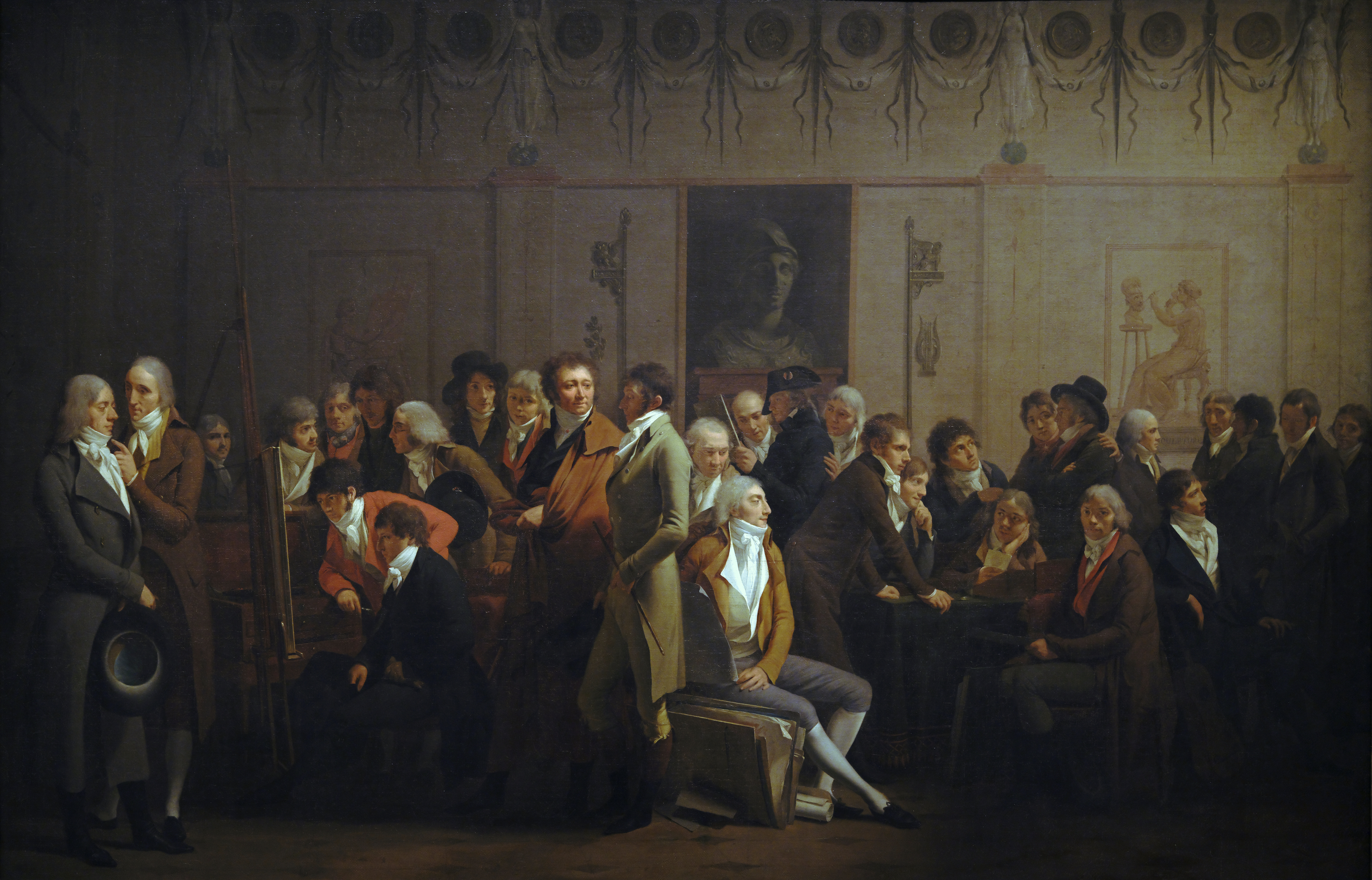
Meeting of Artists in Isabey's Studio, Louis-Léopold Boilly, 1798, Louvre Museum

==== Tenure at the Villa Medici ====
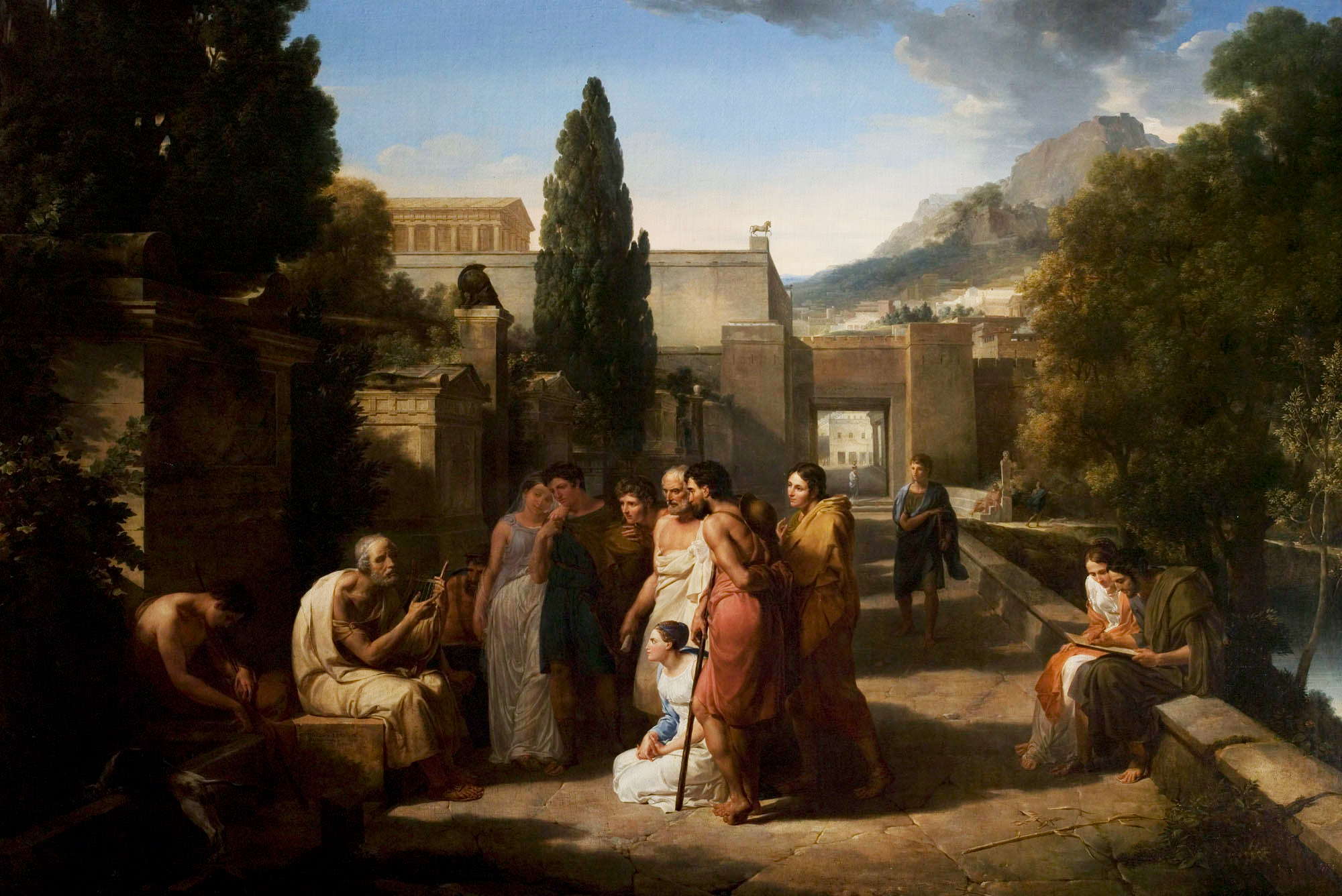
Homer Singing His Iliad at the Gates of Athens, 1811, Nottingham Castle Museum, England

Lethière had finally arrived at the Académie de France in Rome, though contrary to his expectations, the campus had moved from the Palazzo Mancini to the Villa Medici, where conditions seemed desperate. Under Lethière’s influence, students were no longer underfunded, the building was renovated, and the academy gained order. During this time, Lethière created three of the most technically difficult paintings in his career. The first was the Judgment of Paris (1812, private collection), which marked his turn to grand-scale paintings. The latter were the lyrical Homer Singing His Iliad at the Gates of Athens (1814, Nottingham City Museums and Galleries), and the monumental version of Brutus Condemning his Sons to Death (1811, Musée du Louvre), which were both showcased in London from 1816 to 1819. He served as the Director of the Académie de France in Rome up until 1816, when he was replaced, by order of Louis XVIII.

In 1818 he was elected to the Académie des Beaux-Arts. That same year, he also became a Knight in the Legion of Honor. A year later, he became a professor at the École des Beaux-Arts. He ended his career as a member of the Institut de France.

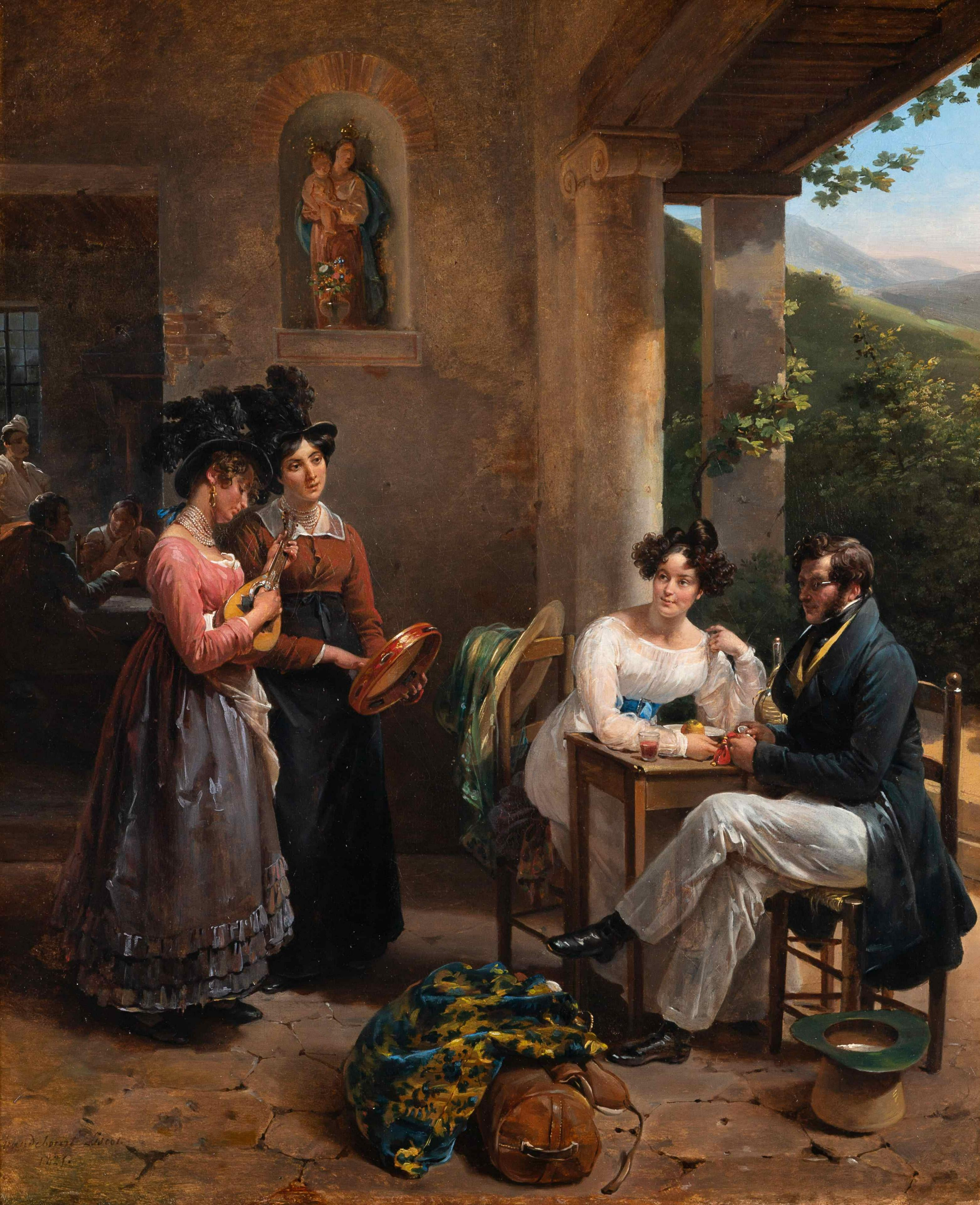
The Wedding Trip (Le Voyage de Noces), 1825, Clark Art Institute, Williamstown

=== Students ===
As a head of a studio, a director, and a professor, Lethière dedicated a lot of his time to mentoring the future generation. His students included Horace Lecoq de Boisbaudran, Jean-Louis Gintrac, François Bouchot, Louis Boulanger, Jean-Auguste-Dominique Ingres, Eugène Devéria, Louis Joseph César Ducornet, Isidore Pils, Théodore Rousseau, Kanuty Rusiecki, Octave Tassaert, and his stepdaughter, Eugénie.

Many of his students were successful, frequently winning the highly renowned Grand Prix de Rome for historical and historical landscape painting. Lethière was specially known for giving opportunities to young women, many of whom had family connections to the Caribbean. His pupils include genre painter and portraitist Hortense Haudebourt-Lescot (1784–1845), who painted The Wedding Trip (1825, Clark Art Institute) – a painting that reflects her time in Italy.

=== Death ===
In 1830, there was an uprising that led to the deposition of King Charles X, and the ascent of his cousin Louis Philippe. Lethière was commissioned to depict this event, more commonly known as the July Revolution, on a large-scale painting. However, he shortly passed away the following year and the canvas was left unfinished in his studio. Though Lethière has been overshadowed by his many peers in France, he is remembered and revered by those in Guadeloupe.

== Selected works ==
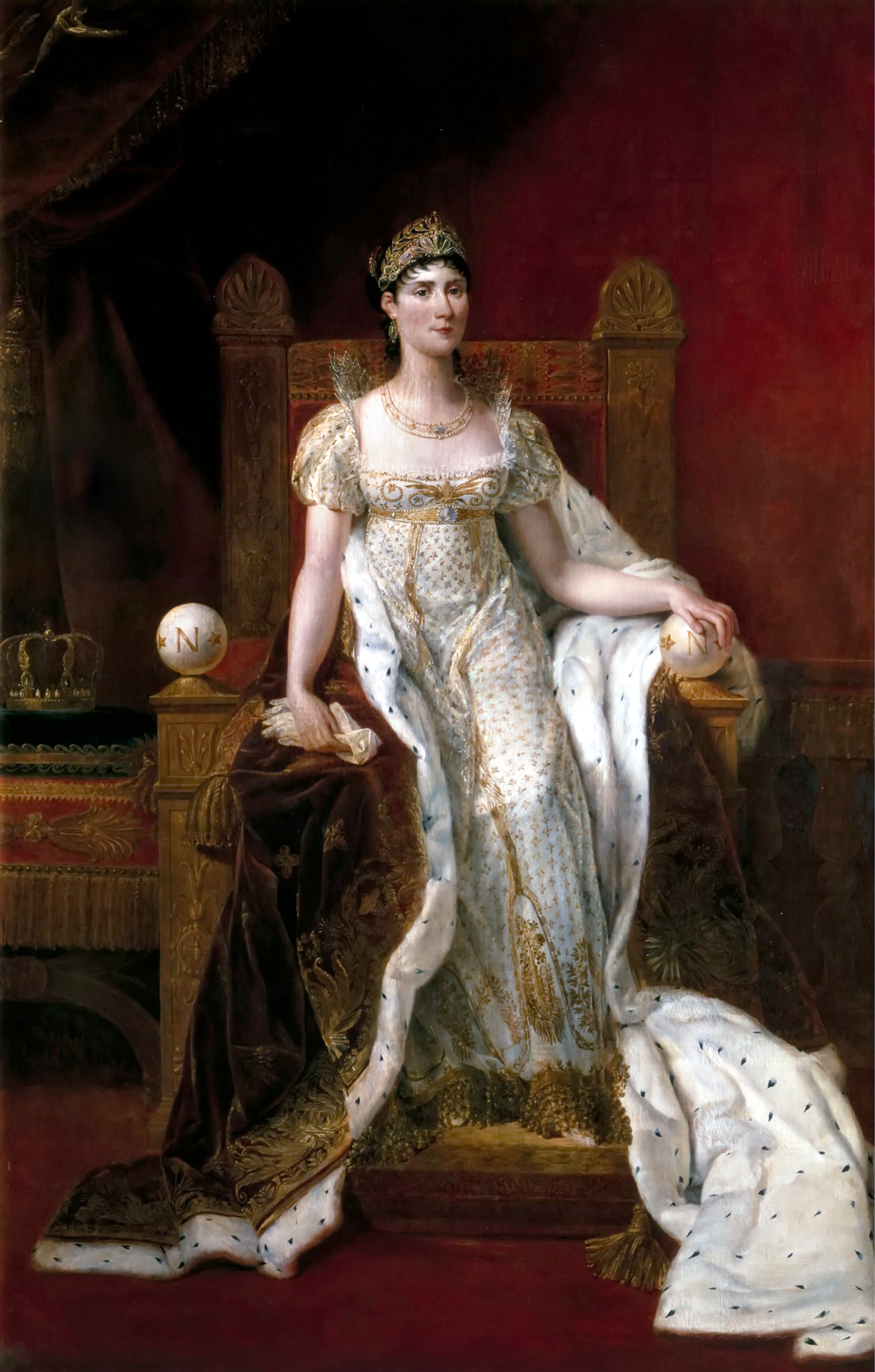
Joséphine, Empress of France, 1807

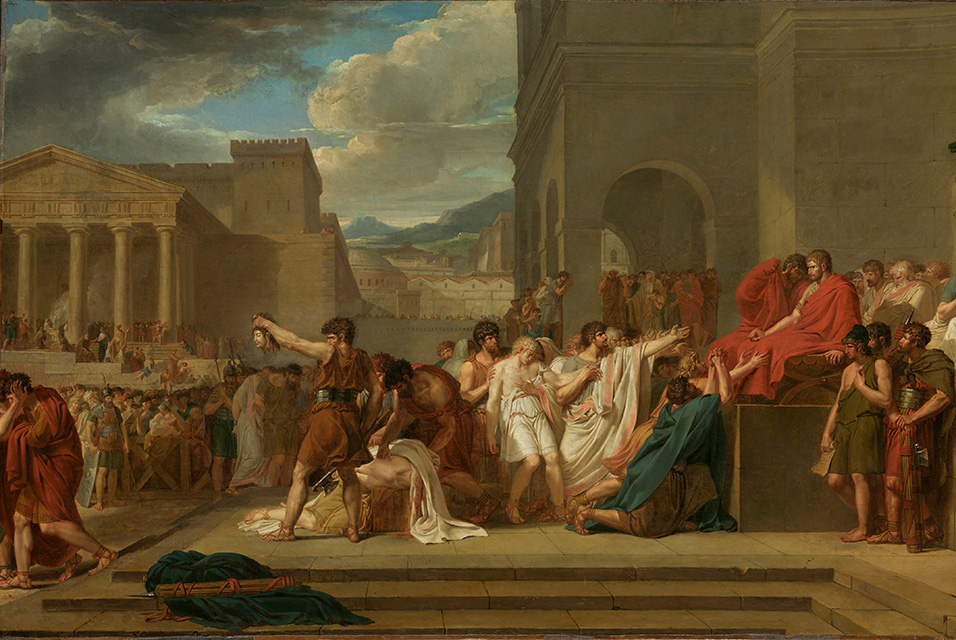
Brutus Condemning His Sons to Death,
1788 (Clark Art Institute)

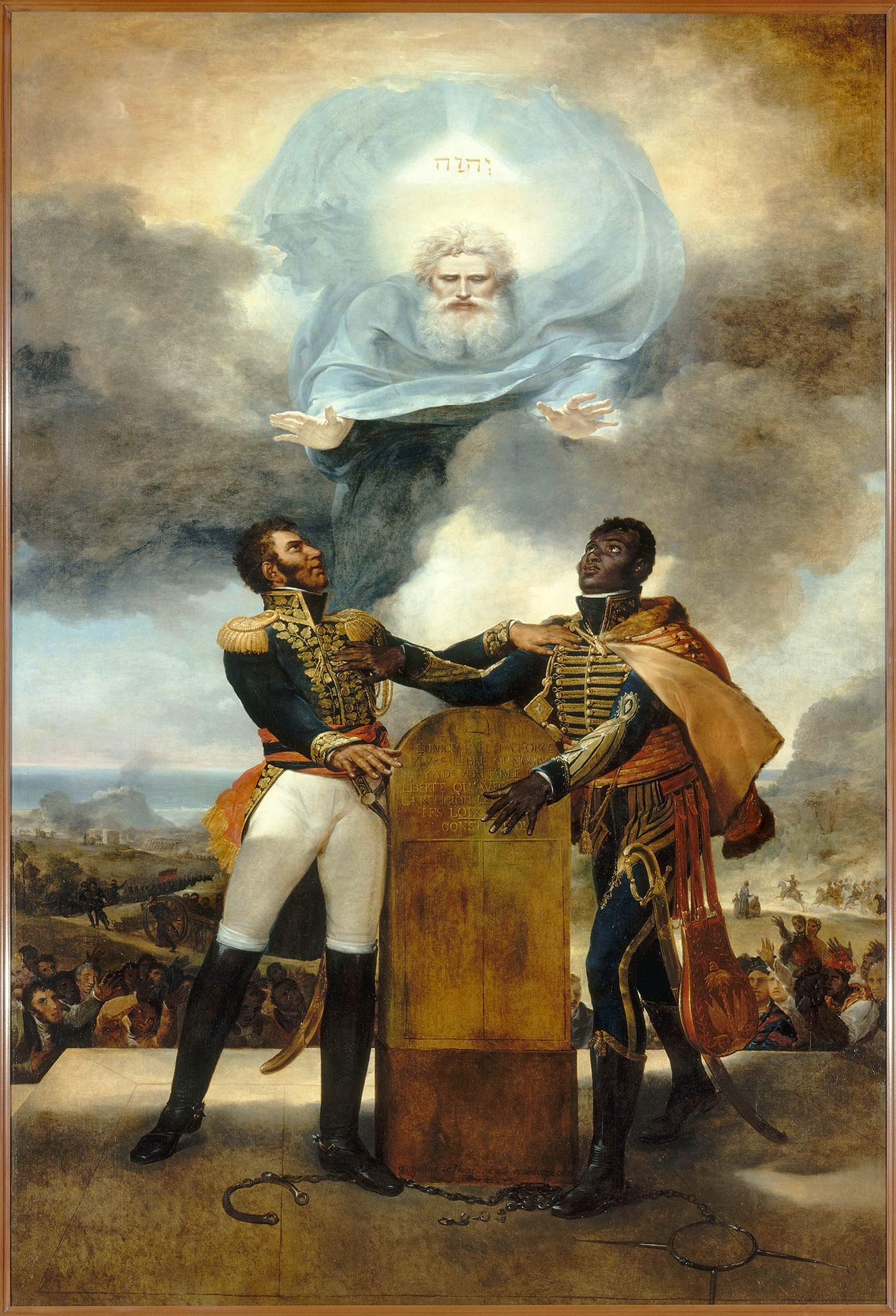
The Oath of the Ancestors, 1822

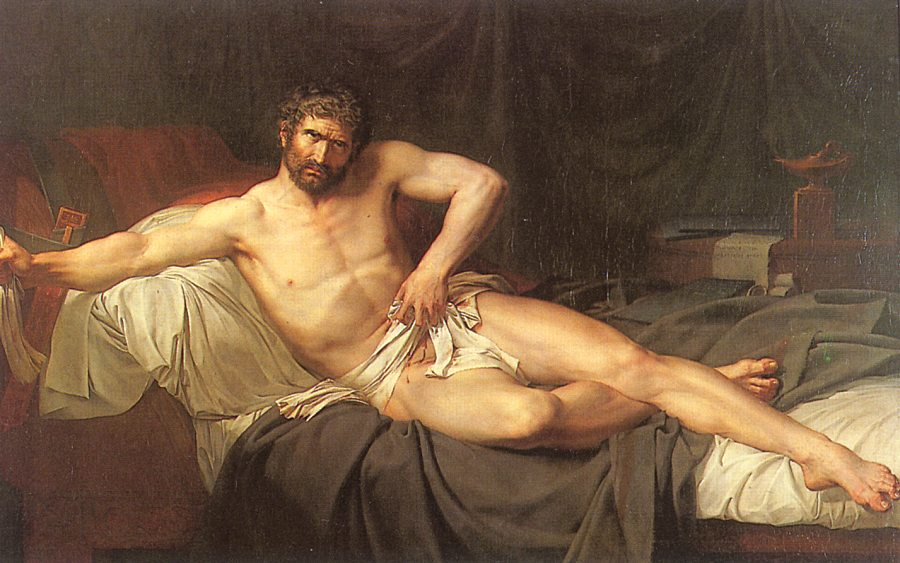
The Death of Cato of Utica, 1795 (Hermitage Museum)

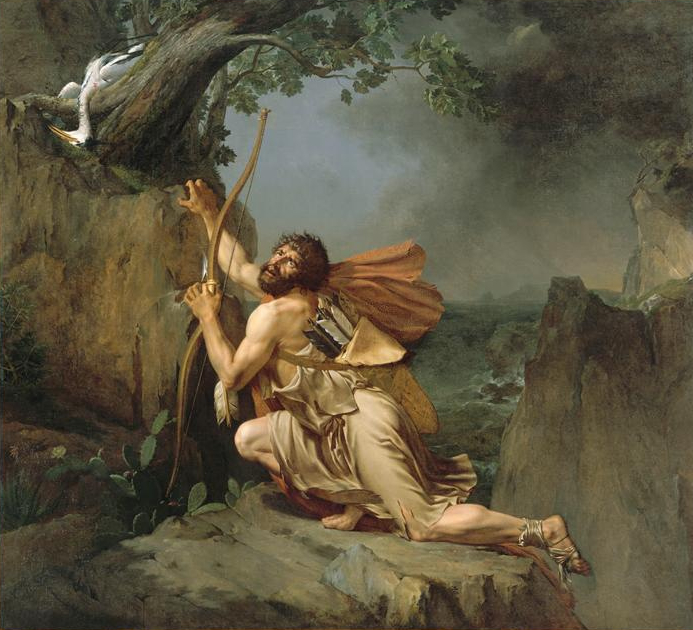
Philoctetes on the Island of Lemnos,,
1798 (Louvre)

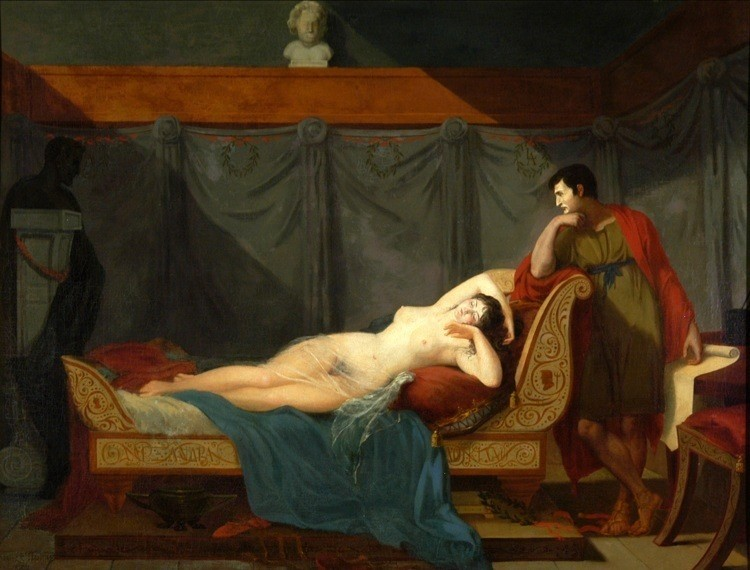
The Sleep of Venus, 1802

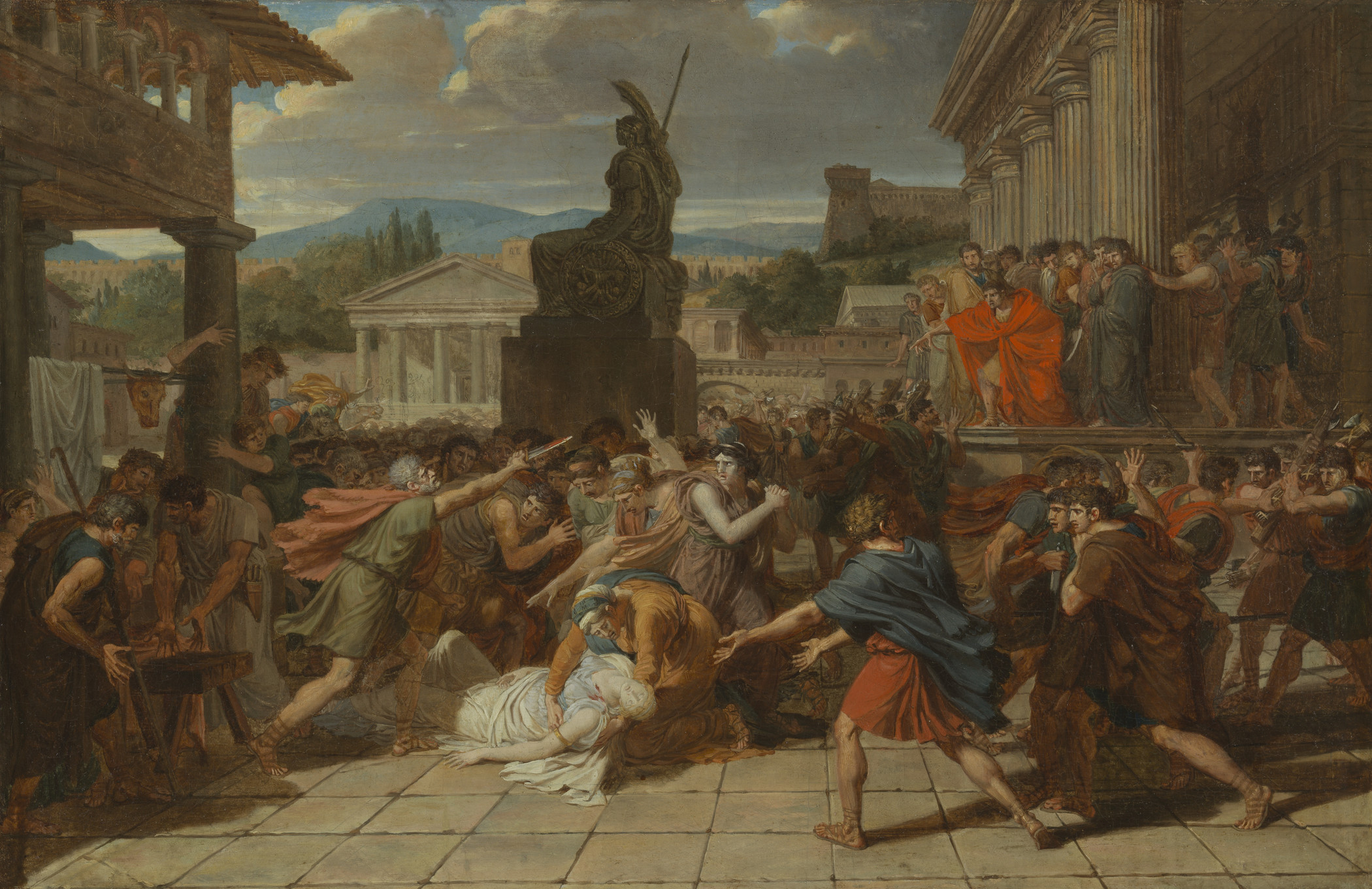
The Death of Virginia,
c.1800 (LACMA)

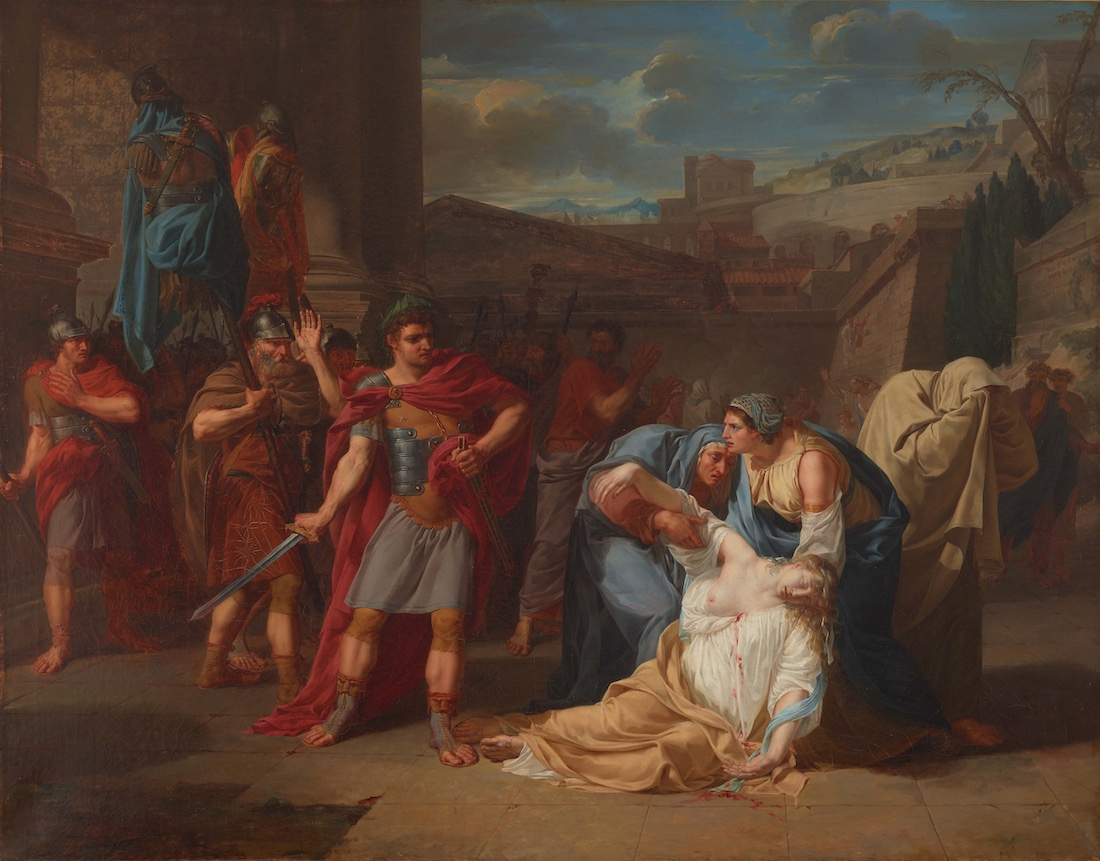
Death of Camilla,
1785 (RISD)

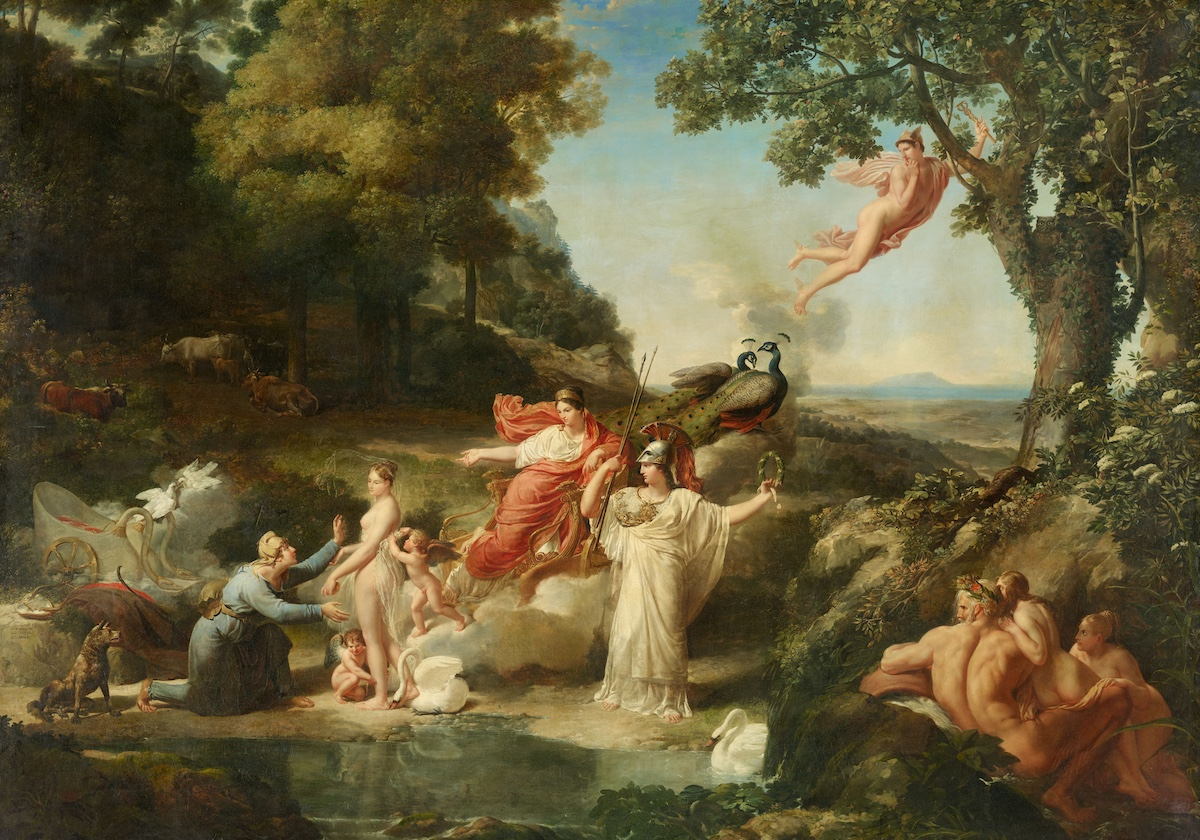
Judgment of Paris,
1812

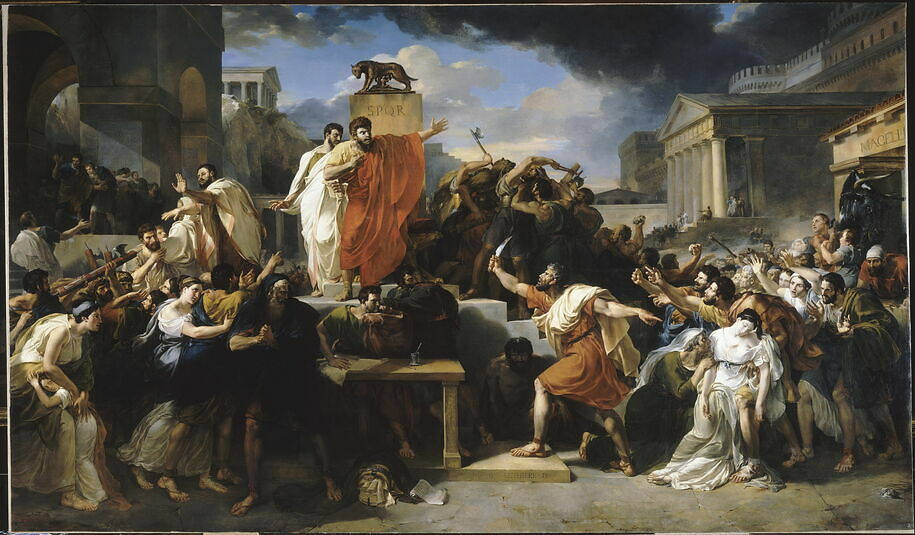
The Death of Virginia, 1828

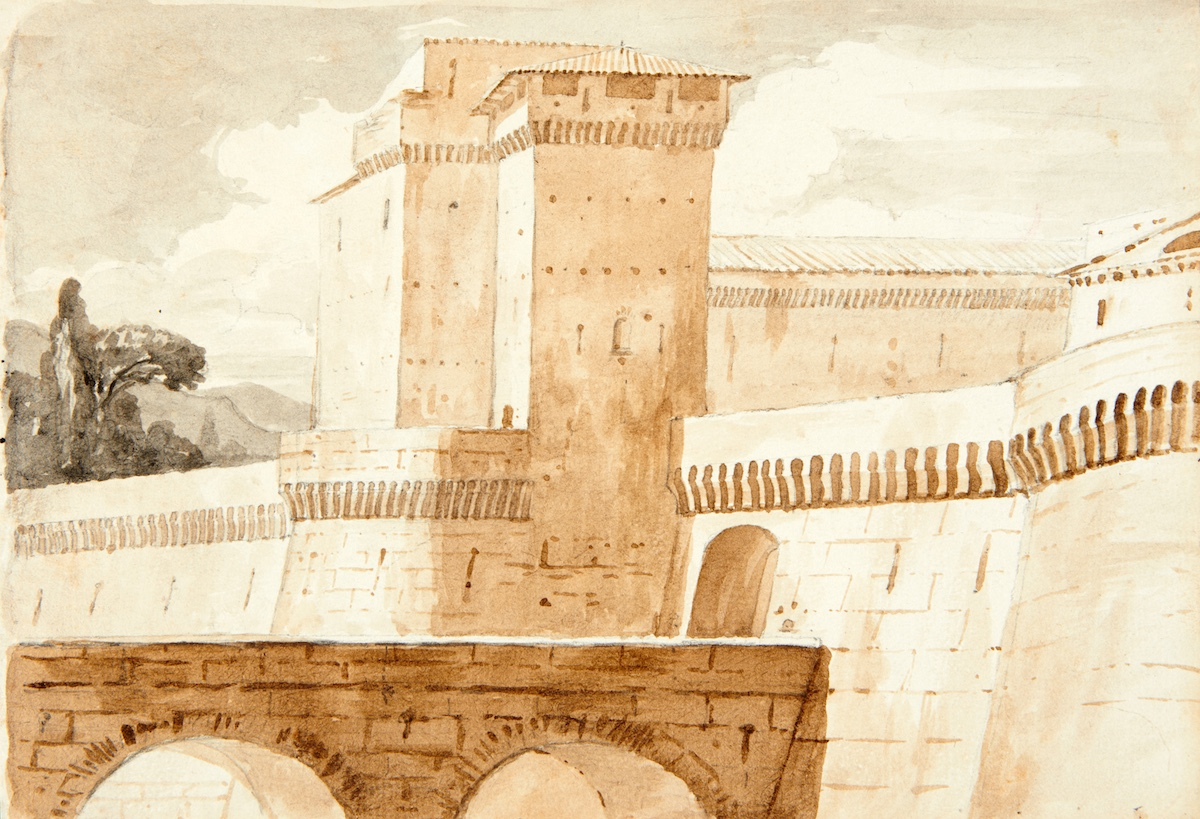
Landscape Album: Ramparts
(Clark Art Institute)

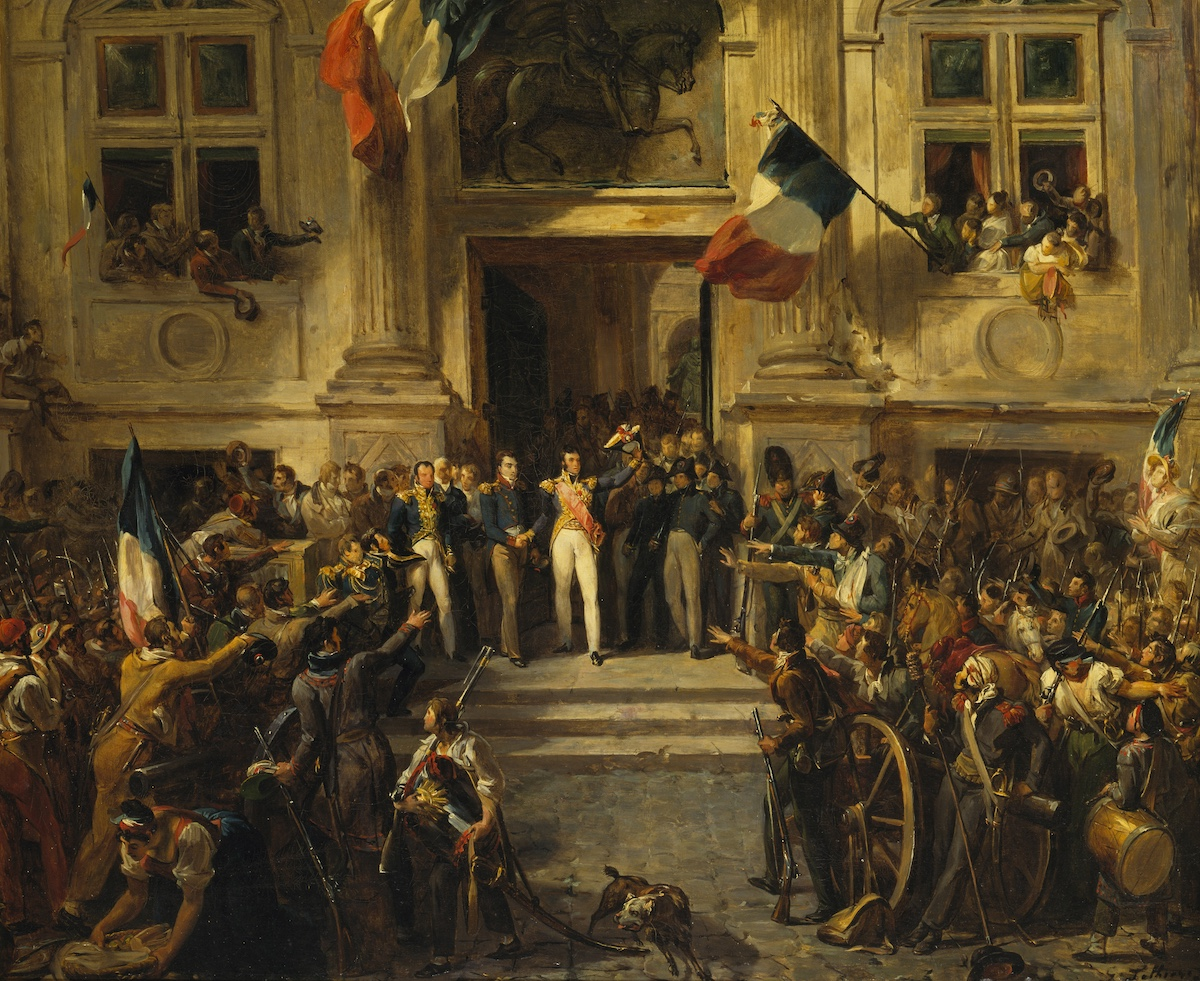
Introducing Louis-Philippe to the People of Paris,
1830-31 (Tokyo Fuji Art Museum)

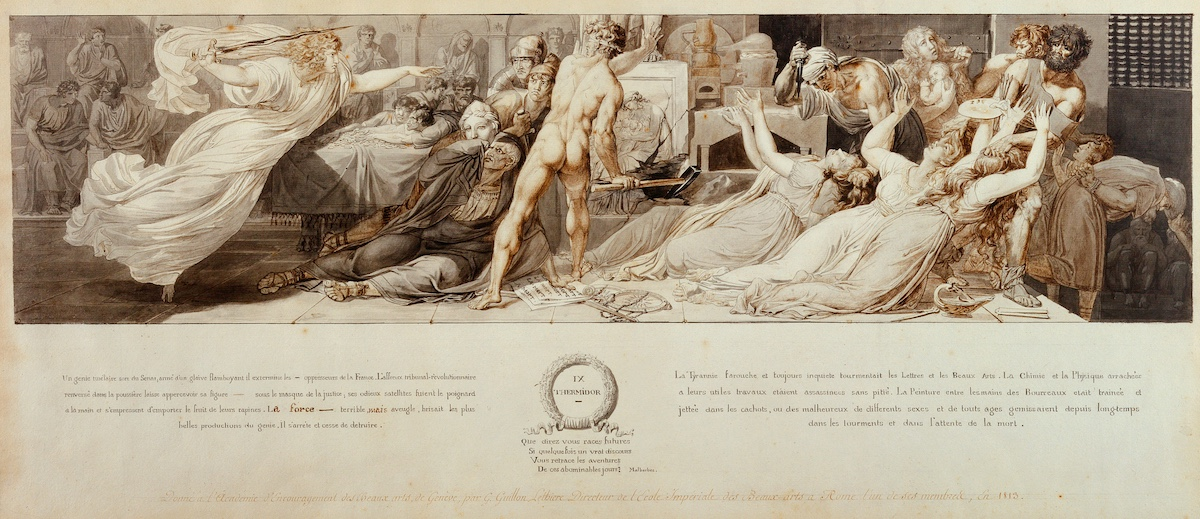
Frieze Representing the Neuf Thermidor (July 27, 1794),
1795 (Musée d'Art et d'Histoire (Geneva))

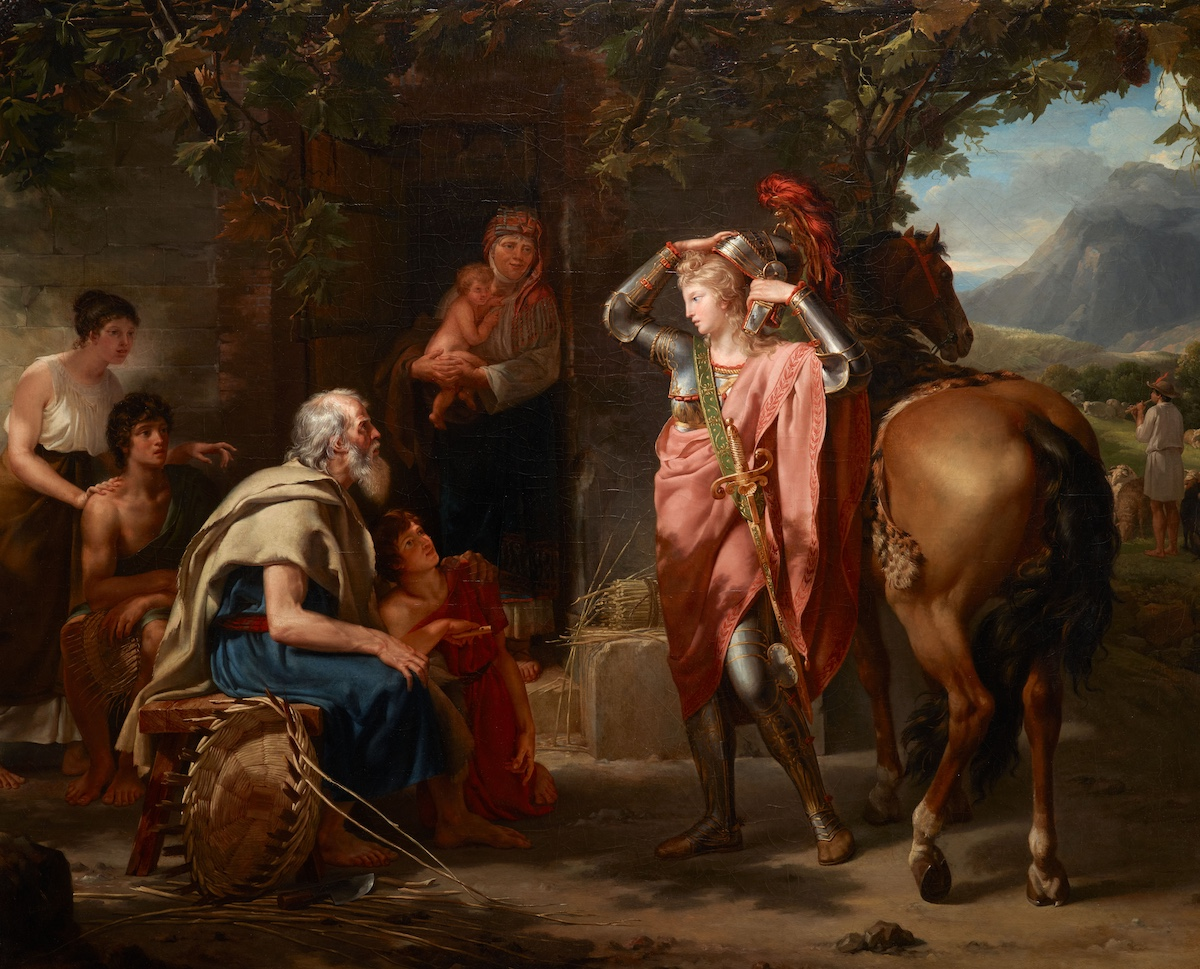
Erminia and the Shepherds,
1795 (Dallas Museum of Art)
