= Antonius Novellus =

Antonius Novellus was a politician of ancient Rome who served as one of the Roman emperor Otho's principal generals, though he possessed no influence with the soldiery.

After Otho heard of the advance of the generals Fabius Valens and Aulus Caecina Alienus against him, he fielded the Praetorian guard under a number of generals, but the guard proved mutinous, with one commander, Aemilius Pacensis, thrown in chains by his men, while Novellus's men utterly disregarded his orders. After his soldiers ignored his rank and authority, leadership effectively devolved on his colleague Titus Suedius Clemens.
