= Gaius Duillius Longus =

Consular tribune in 399 BC

Gaius Duillius Longus was a consular tribune in 399 BC. He served with five others. He is either the son or grandson of Kaeso Duillius Longus.

== Colleagues ==
=== Bibliotheca Historica ===
The Bibliotheca Historica Book XIV Chapter LIV by Diodorus Siculus says that that Gaius served with Gnaeus Genucius Augurinus, Lucius Atilius Priscus, Marcus Pomponius Rufus, Marcus Veturius Crassus Cicurinus, and Valerius Publilius. (Note: Modern scholars believe that "Valerius Publilius" is an error and misspelling of Volero Publilius Philo)

"When the year had come to an end, in Athens Phormion assumed the archonship and in Rome six military tribunes took the place of the consuls, Gnaeus Genucius, Lucius Atilius, Marcus Pomponius, Gaius Duilius, Marcus Veturius, and Valerius Publilius..."

=== Ab Urbe Condita ===
The Ab Urbe Condita Book V Chapter XIII by Livy mentions Marcus Veturius as the only patrician in 399 meaning the following are plebeians: Marcus Pomponius, Caius Duilius, Volero Publilius, Cneius Genucius, and Lucius Atilius. (Note: Caius is equivalent to Gaius, same with Cneius and Gnaeus)

"Of the patricians Marcus Veturius alone obtained a place: almost all the centuries appointed the other plebeian candidates as military tribunes with consular authority. Marcus Pomponius, Caius Duilius, Volero Publilius, Cneius Genucius, Lucius Atilius."

== Connection to Kaeso Duilius Longus ==
The Fasti Capitolini lists Longus as "C. Duilius K.f. K.n. Longus", "K.f. K.n." abbreviates "Kaeso filius, Kaeso nepos", meaning "son of Kaeso, grandson of Kaeso". Kaeso is referring Kaeso or Caeso Duillius Longus (it is unknown whether Kaeso is the father or grandfather of Gaius).
