= Antonius Castor =

Antonius Castor was a pioneering botanist and pharmacologist of ancient Rome who lived in the first century. He is several times quoted and mentioned by Pliny the Elder, who considered him the greatest authority on his subjects.

== Life and identity ==
By Pliny's account Castor lived more than a hundred years, in perfect health both of body and mind, though he was apparently deceased at the time of Pliny's writing. Some scholars have suggested that the longevity attributed to ancient physicians is merely a literary trope, and that Castor may not have actually lived as long as Pliny says.

Castor is possibly the same man as the Antonius who was called by Galen "the herbalist", though is unlikely to be the same as Antonius Musa. He may have been a freedman of the triumvir Mark Antony.

== Botanical garden ==
Castor possessed a vast botanical garden, which is probably the earliest on record, though there is some debate whether an earlier garden cultivated by Aristotle, and afterwards Theophrastus, at the Lyceum was ordered and scientific enough to be considered "botanical". However it is believed that Antonius Castor remains the earliest known example of the intentional cultivation of plants for medical purposes in Europe (as opposed to the collection of wild plants for this purpose).

This garden was significant in that it allowed Castor and fellow scientists like Pliny to encounter up close what they might have only read about in rare scientific texts, which might be vague in their botanical descriptions, and largely lacked illustration. In the 16th century, German botanist Hieronymus Bock cited Castor as an example of why illustrations in botanical texts were of low value: the pioneers in the field would simply grow their own examples, and only needed illustrations of the very rarest specimens. (Other scholars have suggested that Bock was simply trying to justify omitting illustrations in order to keep the cost of his books down.)

== Remedies ==
Several of Castor's recommendations for herbal remedies are known. He suggested fennel root (ferula) to improve vision, the root of potamogiton (possibly Hippuris vulgaris) to fight goitre, and one of the two varieties of horehound (Ballota spp. and Marrubium vulgare) for abscesses and dog bites.
