= Antonius (herbalist) =

Antonius (Ancient Greek: Ἀντώνιος) was a physician of ancient Greece. He was mentioned by the medical writer Galen, and referred to as "the herbalist" (ὁ ῥιζοτόμος). He must have lived in or before the first century (and possibly into the second century).

The medical formulae of Antonius are several times quoted by Galen, and he is perhaps the same person who is called " the druggist" elsewhere (φαρμακοπώλης). Possibly they may both be identical with Antonius Castor, but of this there is no proof whatever.

A treatise on the pulse, which goes under Galen's name, but which is probably a spurious compilation from his other works on this subject, is addressed to a person named Antonius, who is there called "studious and philosophical" (Φιλομαθὴς καὶ Φιλόσοφος); and Galen wrote his work The Passions of the Soul (De Propriorum Animi Cuiuslibet Affectuum Dignotione et Curatione) in answer to a somewhat similar treatise by an Epicurean philosopher of this name, who, however, does not appear to have been a physician.

Antonius is possibly the same man as Antonius Castor, the renowned botanist and pharmacologist mentioned Pliny the Elder.
