= Antonius Flamma =

Ancient Roman politician

Antonius Flamma was a politician of ancient Rome who served as governor of the Roman province of Cyrenaica under the emperor Nero. He was banished at the beginning of Vespasian's reign for his extortion and cruelty. He was not a foreign politician, but was in fact a member of the native ruling class of Cyrenaica. His son was a priest of the local cult center of Apollo.
