= Caeso (praenomen) =

Latin name

Caeso (Classical Latin: [ˈkae̯soː]), feminine Caesula (also spelled Cesula, Caesulla, Caesilla or Caesillia) is a Latin praenomen, or personal name. Although never a common name, Caeso was regularly used by a number of prominent families, both patrician and plebeian, during the period of the Roman Republic. The name also gave rise to the patronymic gens Caesonia. The common abbreviation K. arose from an older spelling, Kaeso, dating from the period when the letter K was still frequently used before the vowel A in Latin, and before the letters C and G were differentiated.

The praenomen Caeso was regularly used by the patrician gentes Fabia and Quinctia during the 1st centuries of the Republic, and also by the plebeian gentes Atilia and Duilia (both of which may originally have been patrician). It is also found in the gentes Acilia, Fabricia, and Latria, and must once have been used by the ancestors of the Caesonia gens. Its use gradually declined throughout Republican times, and seems to have fallen out of use around the first century AD.

== Origin and meaning ==
The most familiar etymology of this praenomen was given by Gaius Plinius Secundus, and followed by Sextus Pompeius Festus, who derived it from the verb caedere, "to cut," and explained that it was originally given to a child who was cut from the mother's womb, in the operation that came to be known as the Caesarean section. This seems to be a reasonable etymology for the name of the operation, but it is probably an example of false etymology with respect to the name Caeso, as well as the cognomen Caesar, which appears to derive from the same root.

Marquardt and Mommsen, while still deriving the name from caedere, speculated that Caeso was somehow connected with the lashings administered by the Luperci, or "brotherhood of the wolf," a body of priests, during the festival of the Lupercalia. As the Luperci ran about the ancient city wall, dressed in animal skins and carrying leather thongs, girls and young women would gather along the route to receive lashes, which were believed to promote fertility.

However, the likeliest explanation derives the name from caesius, "blue-grey," a word frequently used to describe the color of the eyes. This etymology was given by Festus with respect to the feminine form, Caesula. It was also one of four different explanations given for the cognomen Caesar, which Varro believed to have originated as a praenomen. This opinion is accepted by Chase, in his treatise, "The Origin of Roman Praenomina."
