= Spurius Oppius Cornicen =

5th-century BC Roman politician and decemvir

Spurius Oppius Cornicen was a Roman politician and member of the Second Decemvirate in 450 and 449 BC.

== Biography ==
According to Dionysius of Halicarnassus, Spurius Oppius Cornicen was plebeian. He was one of the ten members of the Second Decemvirate, presided over by Appius Claudius Crassus, and elected in order to draft the Law of the Twelve Tables, first body of written law in Roman history. The Second Decemvirate seemed to be made up just as much by plebeians, like Spurius Oppius, as it was of patricians. At the instigation of Crassus, the decemvirs illegally held on to power the following year, and refused to allow the election of consuls.

In 449 BC, a war escalated with the Sabines setting up in Eretum and with the Aequi fortified on Mount Algidus. Roman forces were divided into two armies commanded each by four decemvirs, in order to fight on two fronts; Appius Claudius Crassus and Spurius Oppius Cornicen remained in Rome in order to assure the defense of the city.

The two Roman armies were kept in check on each front respectively, retreating to Fidenae, Crustumerium, and Tusculum. Meanwhile the soldier Lucius Siccius Dentatus, former tribune of the plebs and staunch opponent of the patricians was murdered. Also, Verginia had her freedom taken in a scandalous trial by Crassus. This caused her to be executed by her own father, Lucius Verginius. The soldiers in both armies mutinied and elected twenty military tribunes in order to command in the place of the decemvirs. The soldiers returned to Rome and set up on the Aventine then joined together on Monte Sacro. Under pressure by the soldiers and the plebeians, the decemvirs resigned. Appius Claudius Crassus and Spurius Oppius Cornicen remained in Rome where they were imprisoned. The other eight decemvirs left in exile.

One college of the tribunes of the plebs was elected to restore the old magistrates. Tribune Publius Numitorius took Spurius Oppius to court, but Oppius committed suicide in the process, as did Appius Claudius Crassus, who was charged as well.

== Bibliography ==
=== Ancient bibliography ===
- Livy, Ab urbe condita
- Dionysius of Halicarnassus, Roman Antiquities

=== Modern bibliography ===
- Broughton, T. Robert S. (1951), The American Philological Association (ed.), "The Magistrates of the Roman Republic", Philological Monographs, number XV, volume I, vol. I, 509 B.C. - 100 B.C., New York
- Cels-Saint-Hilaire, Janine (1995), La République des tribus: Du droit de vote et de ses enjeux aux débuts de la République romaine (495-300 av. J.-C.) (in French), Presses universitaires du Mirail, ISBN 2-85816-262-X
