= Verginia =

5th-century BC Roman heroine

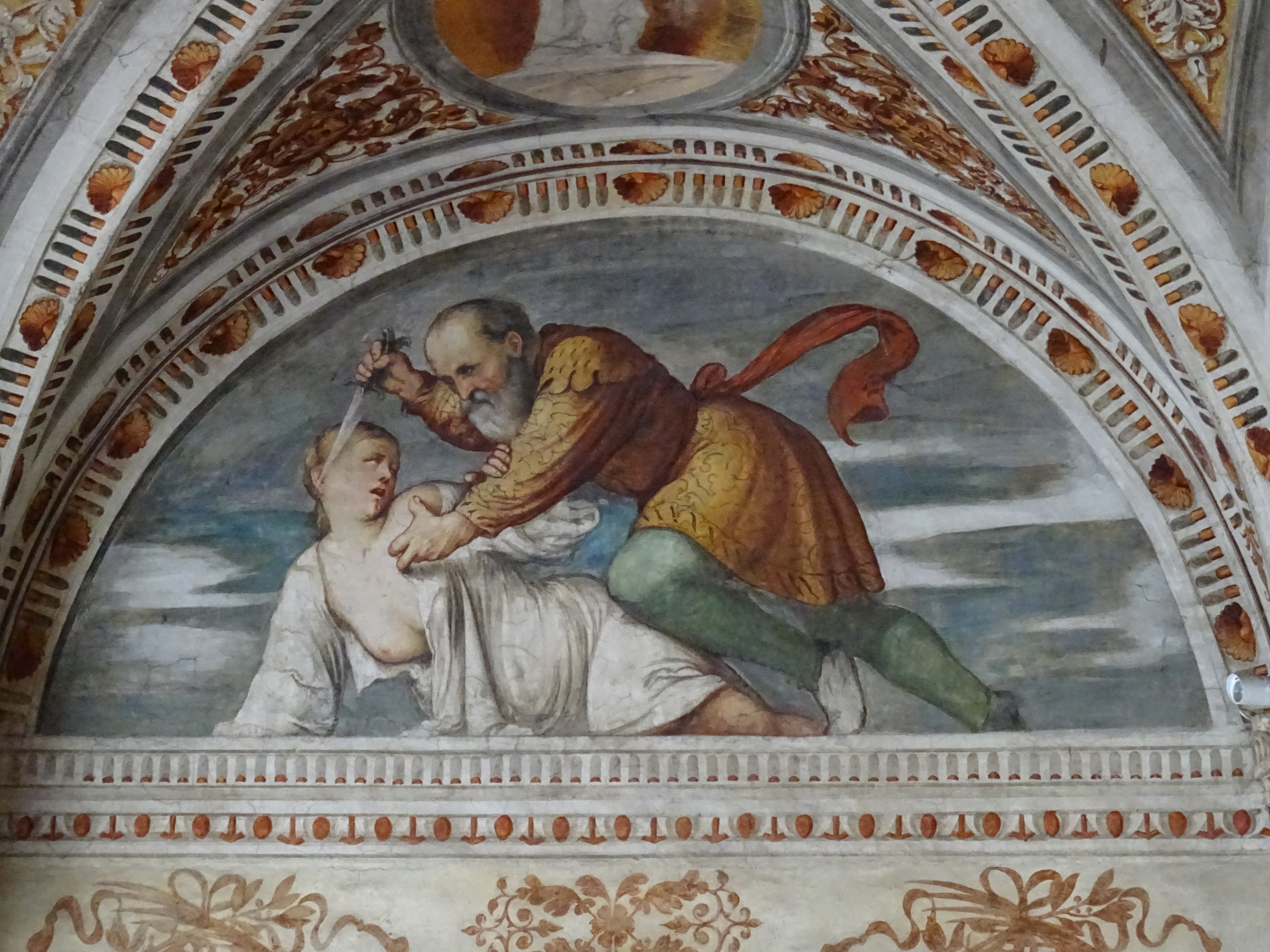
Romanino, The Killing of Virginia.

Verginia, or Virginia (c. 465 BC – 449 BC), was the subject of an ancient Roman story recounted in Roman historian Livy's text Ab Urbe Condita. Upon a threat to her virtue, Verginia was killed by her father Verginius. Livy directly links Verginia's death to the overthrow of the decemviri and the re-establishment of the Roman Republic.

== The story of Verginia ==
In 451 BC, the decemvir Appius Claudius began to lust after Verginia, a beautiful plebeian girl who was the daughter of Lucius Verginius, a respected centurion. Verginia was betrothed to Lucius Icilius, a former tribune of the plebs. When Verginia rejected Claudius' advances, he had one of his clients, Marcus Claudius, claim that she was not the daughter of Verginius but instead the daughter of his slave, and therefore a slave herself. Marcus Claudius then abducted her while she was on her way to school in the Forum, taking advantage of her father's absence from Rome. The crowd in the Forum objected to this, as both Verginius and Icilius were well-respected men, and they forced Marcus Claudius to bring the case before the decemvirs. However, the case was to be presided over by Appius Claudius himself. Verginius was recalled from the field to defend his daughter. Icilius, after threats of violence, succeeded in having Verginia returned to her house while the court waited for her father to appear. Claudius tried to have his own supporters intercept the messengers sent to summon Verginius, but they arrived too late to delay Verginius' arrival.

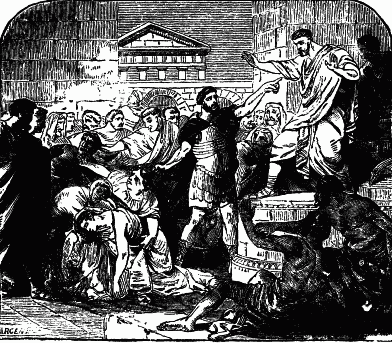
Verginius speaking to Claudius after killing Verginia.

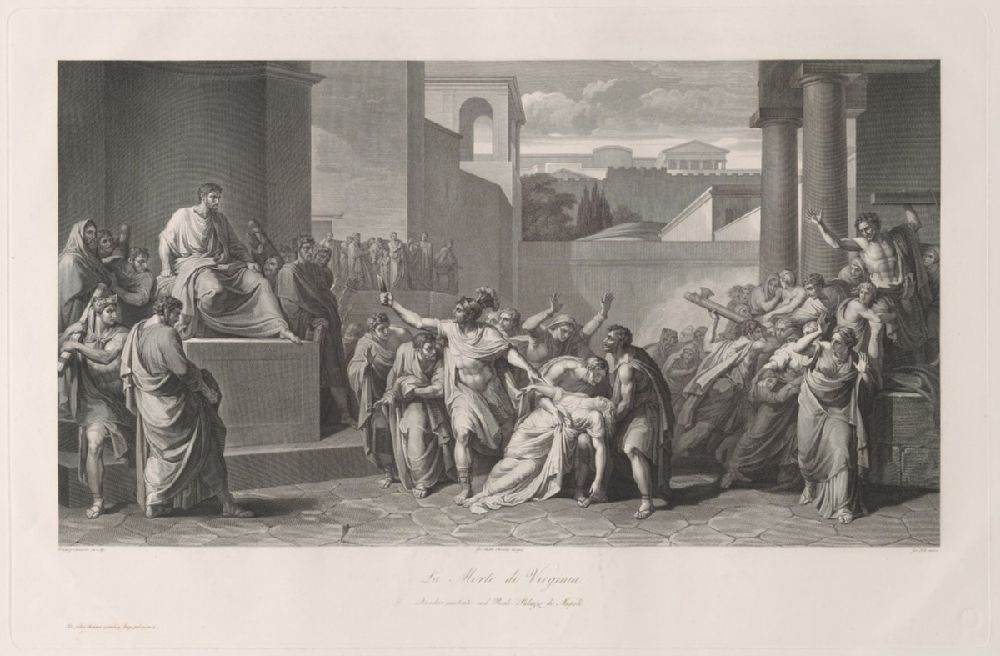
Giovanni Folo after Vincenzo Camuccini, "The Death of Virginia," 1870/1909, engraving and etching, Department of Image Collections, National Gallery of Art Library, Washington, DC

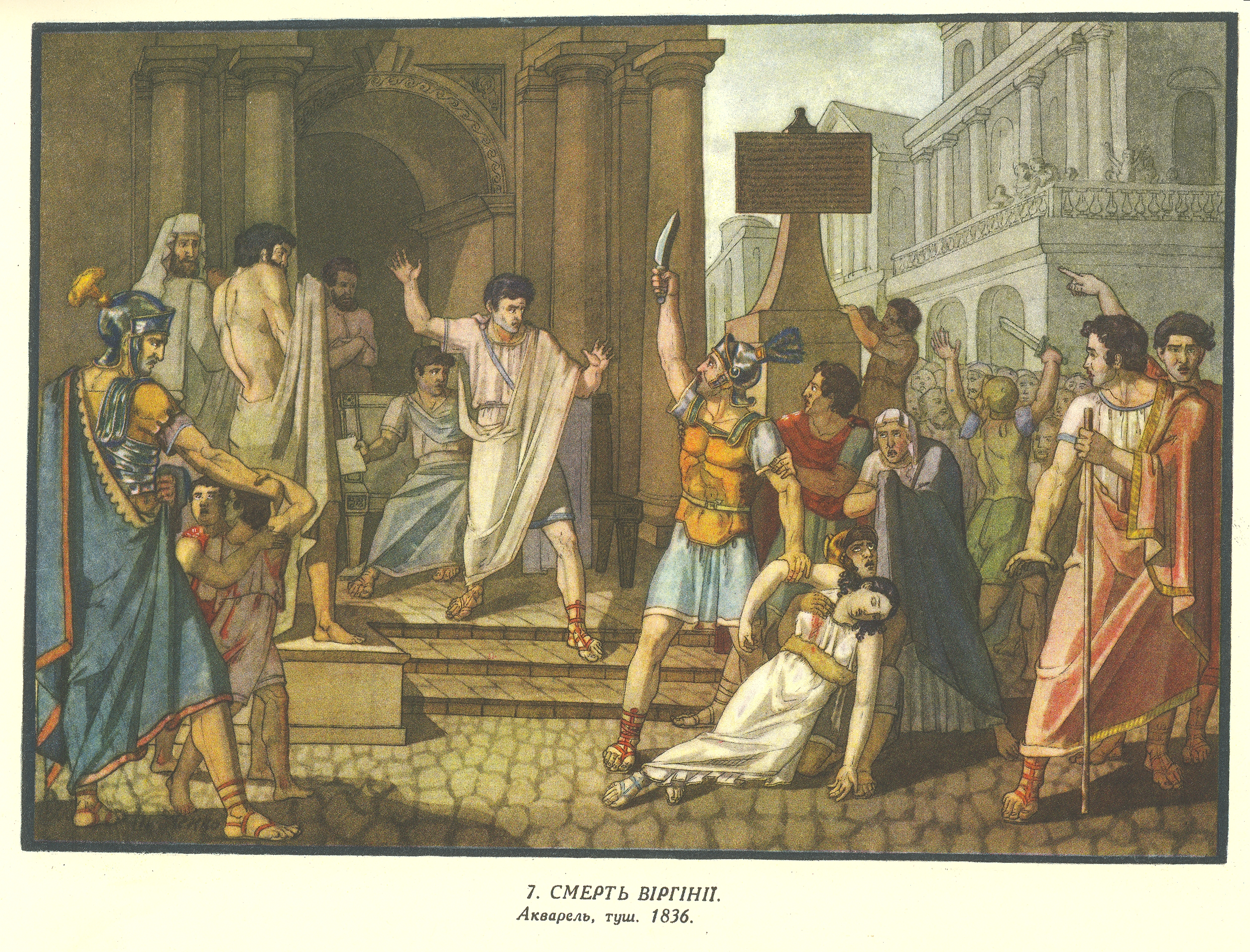
Death of Virginia by Taras Shevchenko.

When Verginius arrived two days later, he gathered his supporters in the Forum. Claudius, unmoved by Verginius' widespread support, would not let him speak or defend himself, and declared that Verginia was indeed Marcus Claudius' slave. Additionally, Claudius had brought an armed escort with him and accused the citizens of sedition, and the supporters of Verginius left the Forum rather than cause any violence. Verginius begged Claudius to question his daughter himself, which Claudius agreed to. However, Verginius grabbed a knife and, at the Shrine of Venus Cloacina, he stabbed Verginia, the only way he felt he could uphold her freedom and virtue. Upon killing her, Livy claims that Verginius spoke to Claudius directly, yelling: "By this blood, Appius, I devote thy head to the infernal gods." Verginius and Icilius were arrested, but their supporters, angered by Claudius' actions, returned to attack the lictors and destroy their fasces. The pair was then released. Claudius was eventually jailed but he committed suicide before his trial. Marcus Claudius was tried, found guilty, and exiled to Tibur. This controversy led to the overthrow of the decemviri and the re-establishment of the Roman Republic.

== References to Verginia in Literature ==
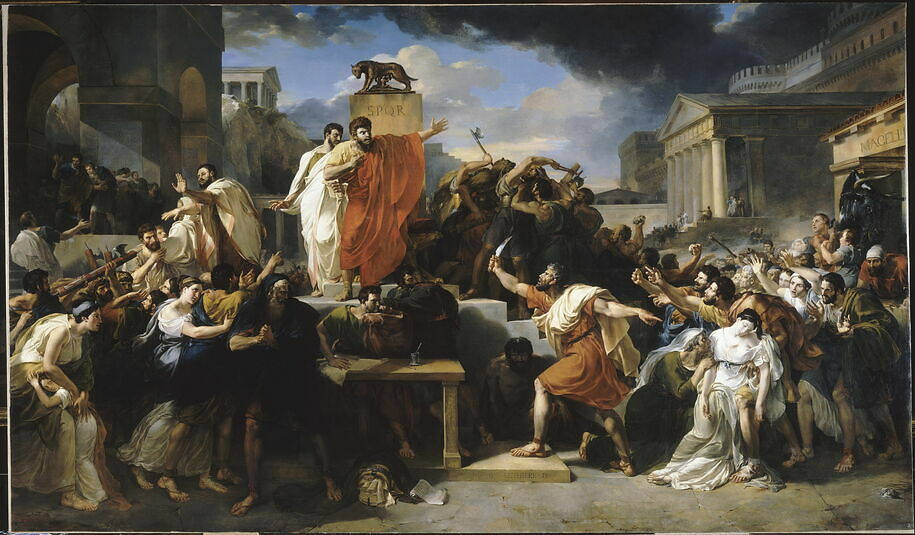
The Death of Virginia by Guillaume Guillon-Lethière, 1828

Livy compared the story of Verginia's death to the rape of Lucretia, whose death led to the overthrow of the Roman monarchy in 509 BC. Modern historians view the stories of Roman women such as Verginia and Lucretia as supporting traditional Roman values through the women's displays of feminine virtue and symbolization of criticisms against the tyrannical Roman government. The people of Rome were already angry with the decemviri for not calling the proper elections, taking bribes, and other abuses after taking power within the Roman government and the story of Verginia attested to this discontent.

The tale is retold, with varying fidelity, in several works of Western literature. Among these are Geoffrey Chaucer's "The Physician's Tale" in his Canterbury Tales, Thomas Babington Macaulay's Lays of Ancient Rome, Jean de Meun's poem Roman de la Rose, and the play Appius and Virginia by John Webster and Thomas Heywood. Verginia is additionally mentioned in William Shakespeare's Titus Andronicus and her story is retold in Steven Saylor's Roma.

== See also ==
- The Story of Virginia (Botticelli)
- Verginia gens
