= Eretum =

Coordinates: 42.1352°N 12.7383°E

Map showing the location of the Sabines. The border with Latium to the south was the Aniene river; however, it is possible that Sabines extended to Lake Regillus slightly to the south of it near Gabii.

Eretum (Greek: Ἠρητόν), was an ancient town of the Sabines, situated on the Via Salaria, at its junction with the Via Nomentana, a short distance from the Tiber, and about 30 km (19 mi) from Rome.

== History ==
Eretum lay near the frontier between Roman and Sabine territory in the regal period and early Republic. Solinus writes that it was established by Greeks in honor of Hera, and thus the name of the city (which he calls "Heretum") derives from her name. From the mention of its name by Virgil among the Sabine cities which joined in the war against Aeneas, we may presume that it was considered as an ancient town, and one of some importance in early times.

Eretum never bears any prominent part in history, though from its frontier position on the line by which the former people must advance upon Rome, it was the scene of repeated conflicts between the two nations. The first of these occurred in the reign of Tullus Hostilius, during the war of that monarch with the Sabines; his successor Tarquinius Priscus also defeated the Etruscans, who had taken advantage of the friendly disposition of the Sabines to advance through their territory, at Eretum; and Tarquinius Superbus gained a decisive victory over the Sabines in the same neighbourhood. Under the Roman republic also we find two victories recorded over the Sabines at the same place, the one by the consuls Postumius and Menenius in 503 BCE, the other by Gaius Nautius Rutilus in 458 BCE. During the decemvirate also the Sabines established their headquarters at Eretum, whence they ravaged the Roman territory. It is again mentioned in the Second Punic War as the place whence Hannibal diverged to attack the shrine of Feronia in Etruria, during his advance on Rome (or, according to others, on his retreat) by the Salarian Way. But though its position thus brings it frequently into notice, it is clear that it was, under the Roman dominion at least, a very inconsiderable place. Strabo says it was little more than a village, and Valerius Maximus terms it vicus Sabinae regionis. Pliny does not even mention it among the towns of the Sabines, nor is its name found in the Liber Coloniarum: hence it is almost certain that it did not enjoy municipal privileges, and was dependent on one of the neighbouring towns, probably Nomentum (modern Mentana). But its name is still found in the Itineraries as a station on the Salarian Way, and it must therefore have continued to exist as late as the fourth century. From this time all trace of it disappears.

== Location ==
The position of Eretum has been a subject of much dispute, though the data furnished by ancient authorities are sufficiently precise. The Itineraries place it 18 Roman miles from Rome; and Dionysius in one passage calls it 140 stadia (ca. 27 km (17 mi)) from the city, though in another place he gives the same distance at only 107 stadia. Strabo adds that it was situated at the point of junction of the Via Salaria and Via Nomentana; a circumstance which could leave no doubt as to its position, but that there is some difficulty in tracing the exact course of the Via Salaria, which appears to have undergone repeated changes in ancient times. Hence Abbé Capmartin De Chaupy was led to fix the site of Eretum at a place called Rimane, where there were some Roman ruins near a bridge called the Ponte di Casa Cotta, but this spot is not less than 21 miles from Rome; on the other hand, Monterotondo, the site chosen by Cluverius, is little more than 15 miles from Rome, and could never by possibility have been on the Via Nomentana. Grotta Marozza (a località of the comune of Mentana), on the left hand of the Via Nomentana, rather more than 3 miles beyond Nomentum, has therefore decidedly the best claim: it is 17.5 miles from Rome, and it is probable that the ancient Via Salaria did not follow the same line with the modern road of that name, but left the valley of the Tiber near Monte Rotondo, and joined the Via Nomentana near the spot above indicated. There are no ruins at Grotta Marozza, but the site is described as well-adapted for that of a town of small extent.

At a short distance from Grotta Marozza are some sulphureous springs now known as the Bagni di Grotta Marozza, which are in all probability those anciently known as the Aquae Labanae (the Λαβανὰ ὕδαγα of Strabo, who describes them as situated in the neighbourhood of Eretum).

== See also ==
- Tiber Valley
