= Mount Algidus =

Dormant volcano in Italy

Coordinates: 41.7266751°N 12.708586°E

Mount Algidus (Latin: Algidus Mons, "Chilly Mountain") is the eastern rim of the dormant Alban Volcano in the Alban Hills, about 20 kilometres (12 mi) southeast of Rome, Italy. The ridge is traversed by a narrow crevasse called the Cava d'Aglio. It was the site of the ancient Roman Battle of Mount Algidus.

The Via Latina, a road that was strategically advantageous in the military history of Rome, leads to the mountain pass beside Mount Algidus. Dionysius of Halicarnassus claimed that a town was founded on the mountain, but this has not been verified by modern scholarship. Although an extensive fortification lines the Maschio d'Ariano, the hill to the south of the Via Latina, this particular structure is entirely medieval and therefore did not exist during the time period described by Dionysius. However, some historical topographers have mistakenly included it on maps meant to illustrate Italy during the Western Roman Empire.
