= Ummidius =

Ancient Roman nomen

Ummidius is a Roman nomen gentilicium. Notable people with the name include:

- Gaius Ummidius Actius Anicetus, Roman pantomime actor
- Gaius Ummidius Durmius Quadratus (c. 12 BC – c. 60 AD), Roman senator
- Gaius Ummidius Quadratus, Roman consul
- Gaius Ummidius Quadratus Sertorius Severus, Roman senator
- Marcus Ummidius Quadratus Annianus (138–182), Roman Senator
