= Gaius Ummidius Quadratus Sertorius Severus =

2nd century Roman senator, consul and governor

Gaius Ummidius Quadratus Sertorius Severus was a Roman senator active during the second century AD. He was suffect consul in absentia for the nundinium of May to June 118 as the colleague of the emperor Hadrian. He is more frequently known by his shorter name, Gaius Ummidius Quadratus; his full name was known only after a missing piece to an inscription from Tomis was found.

== Family origins ==
The Ummidii were an Italian family, who first gained prominence in late Republican times. As Ronald Syme writes, "The nomen is rare and distinctive, Casinum their patria". Syme infers from the last two elements in his name that either Quadratus' father, or his mother's brother was one Sertorius Severus, and identifies him with a correspondent of Pliny the Younger. Then again, in the same paper he considers it "more likely" that Quadratus' father was the son of Ummidia Quadratilla, the daughter of Gaius Ummidius Durmius Quadratus, governor of Syria from c. 50 to the year 60; in either case, Quadratus was the grandson of Ummidia Quadratilla. Anthony Birley identifies Quadratus' mother with an aunt of Marcus Aurelius, "a fourth child of old Annius Verus and Rupilia Faustina".

== Life ==
Pliny the Younger offers the earliest mention of Quadratus. In a letter to his friend Geminus dated to the year 107, Pliny writes of the death of Quadratus' grandmother just shy of her eightieth birthday. She had bequeathed two-thirds of her estate to Quadratus and a third to her granddaughter, presumably Quadratus' sister. While Pliny admits he doesn't know the granddaughter, Quadratus is well known to him, and describes the man in very positive terms. Details about Quadratus include his promise as a lawyer, that he had married before the age of 24 -- thus likely before he was appointed quaestor, which commonly happened at age 25 -- and that his inheritance included the house of the philosopher Gaius Cassius.

We know few details about Quadratus until he acceded to the consulate in 118. However, that he was associated with emperor Hadrian indicates he was a member of the inner circle. Once he stepped down from the consulate, Quadratus was appointed governor of Moesia Inferior; he held this office from 118 to 122. The next office he is recorded as holding was one of the apices of a successful consular career, proconsular governor of Africa. A number of inscriptions from that province attest that Quadratus assisted several persons in becoming Roman citizens.

The Historia Augusta mentions Quadratus in a list of three men—the other two being Lucius Catilius Severus and Marcius Turbo—whom the emperor Hadrian treated harshly. Syme admits it is unclear what these men did, or were thought to have done, to incur Hadrian's displeasure.

== Family ==
There is no direct authority for the name of Quadratus' wife, although Ronald Syme suggests on onomastic evidence, that she might have been named Annia, a daughter of Marcus Annius Verus. He is known to have had at least one son, Gaius Ummidius Quadratus Annianus Verus, consul suffectus in an uncertain year, perhaps AD 146; Syme provides the information that he married his son to Annia Cornificia Faustina, sister of emperor Marcus Aurelius. The two provided Quadratus with a grandson, Marcus Ummidius Quadratus Annianus, consul ordinarius in 167.

Political offices
Preceded by Hadrian II; Bellicius Tebanianus	Suffect Consul of the Roman Empire; 118 with Hadrian II	Succeeded by Lucius Pomponius Bassus; Titus Sabinius Barbarus as suffecti
