= Roman Catholic Diocese of Monte Cassino =

The Territorial Abbey of Monte Cassino (Latin: Abbatia Territorialis Montis Cassini) is a Roman Catholic diocese located in Monte Cassino, a rocky hill on the former site of the Roman town of Casinum about 130 kilometres (81 mi) southeast of Rome and 105 kilometres (65 mi) of Naples. It was erected on 2 May 132.

== Bishops ==
- Oddone della Sala (6 June 1323 – ????), as apostolic administrator
- Raymond de Gramat (9 April 1326 – 26 July 1340)
- Guido di San Germano (6 November 1340 – ????)
- Richer de Miremont (10 October 1341 – 27 February 1343)
- Étienne Aldebrand (14 March 1343 – 13 February 1346), transferred to the diocese of Saint-Pons-de-Thomières
- Guillaume de Rosières (7 April 1346 – 1353), transferred to the diocese of Tarbes
- Francesco Atti (17 April 1353 – 1355)
- Angelo Acciaioli (18 March 1355 – 4 October 1357)
- Angelo della Posta (23 March 1358 – ????)
- Angelo Orsini (26 August 1362 – December 1367)
- Beato Papa Urbano V † (1366 - 1369)
- Bartolomeo da Siena, O.S.B. † (31 August 1369 - 1369)
- Andrea da Faenza, O.S.B. † (5 December 1369 - 18 September 1373)
- Pietro de Tartaris, O.S.B. † (7 February 1374 - 4 June 1395)
- Enrico Tomacelli, O.S.B. † (22 June 1396 - June 1413)
- Pirro Tomacelli, O.S.B. † (7 April 1414 - 1441)
- Giovanni de Primis, O.S.B. † (17 December 1441 - 22 April 1444)
- Antonio Carafa, O.S.B. † (26 May 1446 - 1st of February 1454)
- Ludovico Trevisano † (18 May 1454 - 26 March 1465)
- Papa Paolo II † (29 March 1465 - 27 lJuly 1471)
- Giovanni d'Aragona † (30 August 1471 - 17 October 1485)
- Giovanni de' Medici † (14 March 1486 - 15 November 1504)
- Eusebio Fontana, O.S.B. † (11 January 1505 - 15 November 1506)
- Zaccaria Castagnola, O.S.B. † (May 1533)
- Crisostomo de Alessandro, O.S.B. † (May 1533 - May 1538) (for the second time)
- Girolamo I, O.S.B. † (May 1538 - May 1539)
- Ignazio II, O.S.B. † (May 1539 - May 1541)
- Girolamo Scloccheto, O.S.B. † (May 1541 - May 1546)
- Lorenzo Zambelli, O.S.B. † (May 1546 - May 1549)
- Girolamo Scloccheto, O.S.B. † (May 1549 - May 1551) (for the second time)
- Innocenzo Nicolai, O.S.B. † (May 1551 - May 1554)
- Girolamo Calcini, O.S.B. † (May 1554 - May 1555)
- Isidoro Mantegazzi, O.S.B. † (May 1555 - May 1556)
- Ignazio Vicani, O.S.B. † (May 1556 - May 1559)
- Angelo de Faggis, O.S.B. † (May 1559 - May 1564)
- Ignazio Vicani, O.S.B. † (May 1564 -May 1565) (for the second time)
- Angelo de Faggis, O.S.B. † (May 1565 - May 1568) (for the second time)
- Bernardo de Adamo, O.S.B. † (May 1568 – May 1570)
- Mattia Mattaleia, O.S.B. † (May 1570 – May 1572)
- Angelo de Faggis, O.S.B. † (May 1572 – May 1575) (for the third time)
- Girolamo Gersale, O.S.B. † (May 1575 – August 1577)
- Bernardo Ferrajolo, O.S.B. † (August 15, 1577 – May 1580)
- Desiderio II, O.S.B. † (May 1580 – May 1585)
- Bernardo Ferrajolo, O.S.B. † (May 1585 – January 1587) (for the second time)
- Egidio Sernicoli, O.S.B. † (May 1587 – May 1589)
- Andrea II, O.S.B. † (May 1589 – May 1590)
- Girolamo Brugia, O.S.B. † (May 1590 – May 1595)
- Basilio II, O.S.B. † (May 1595 – September 1596)
- Vittorino de Manso, O.S.B. † (January 1597 – May 1598)
- Zaccaria Tarasco, O.S.B. † (May 1598 – May 1599)
- Ambrogio Rastellini, O.S.B. † (May 1599 – December 1602)
- Desiderio III, O.S.B. † (January 1603 – December 1604)
- Gregorio Casamata, O.S.B. † (January 1605 – 2 August 1608)
- Paolo da Cosenza, O.S.B. † (14 October 1608 – 21 October 1609)
- Onorato Scalisi, O.S.B. † (22 October 1609 – 19 April 1614)
- Isidoro Agresti, O.S.B. † (20 April 1614 – 22 April 1617)
- Paolo Scotti, O.S.B. † (23 April 1617 – May 1621)
- Bernardino Saivedra, O.S.B. † (May 1621 – December 1624)
- Simplicio Caffarelli, O.S.B. † (January 1625 – December 1628)
- Paolo Scotti, O.S.B. † (January 1629 – December 1630) (for the second time)
- Angelo Grassi, O.S.B. † (January 1631 – 18 December 1631)
- Paolo Camillo Casati, O.S.B. † (January 1632 – December 1634)
- Desiderio Petronio, O.S.B. † (January 1635 – December 1639)
- Severino Fusco, O.S.B. † (January 1640 – May 1645)
- Andrea Arcioni, O.S.B. † (May 1645 – December 1647)
- Desiderio Petronio, O.S.B. † (January 1648 – 15 July 1649) (for the second time)
- Domenico Quesada, O.S.B. † (January 1650 – December 1653)
- Carlo de Mauro, O.S.B. † (January 1654 – March 1657)
- Angelo della Noce, O.S.B. † (March 1657 – May 1661)
- Anastasio Perrone, O.S.B. † (May 1661 – April 1665)
- Angelo della Noce, O.S.B. † (May 1665 – April 1669) (for the second time)
- Mauro Cesarini, O.S.B. † (May 1669 – April 1675)
- Severino Pepe, O.S.B. † (May 1675 – May 1680)
- Andrea Deodati, O.S.B. † (May 1680 – May 1681)
- Sebastiano Biancardi, O.S.B. † (May 1681 – April 1687)
- Andrea Deodati, O.S.B. † (May 1687 – April 1692)
- Severino Pepe, O.S.B. † (May 1692 – 27 August 1697) (for the second time)
- Ippolito della Penna, O.S.B. † (20 November 1697 – April 1704)
- Gregorio Galisio, O.S.B. † (May 1704 – April 1717)
- Nicola Ruggi, O.S.B. † (May 1717 – 16 August 1722)
- Arcangelo Brancaccio, O.S.B. † (17 September – 24 April 1725)
- Sebastiano Gadaleta, O.S.B. † (June 1725 – April 1731)
- Stefano de Stefano, O.S.B. † (April 1731 – 3 February 1737)
- Ildefonso del Verme, O.S.B. † (May 1737 – May 1739)
- Sebastiano Gadaleta, O.S.B. † (May 1739 – May 1745) (for the second time)
- Antonio Capece, O.S.B. † (May 1745 – May 1751)
- Giovanni Maria Ragosa, O.S.B. † (May 1751 – 3 December 1753)
- Marino Migliarese, O.S.B. † (1754 – April 1760)
- Domenico Favilla, O.S.B. † (May 1760 – April 1766)
- Aurelio Parisio, O.S.B. † (April 1766 – May 1772)
- Rinaldo Santomagno, O.S.B. † (May 1772 – May 1778)
- Domenico Favilla, O.S.B. † (May 1778 – 1780) (for the second time)
- Prospero de Rosa, O.S.B. † (May 1781 – 1787)
- Tommaso Capomazza, O.S.B. † (March 21, 1788 – April 1793)
- Prospero de Rosa, O.S.B. † (May 1793 – 1797) (for the second time)
- Marino Lucarelli, O.S.B. † (October 4, 1797 – April 1804)
- Aurelio Visconti, O.S.B. † (April 1804 – 1816)
- Giuseppe del Balzo, O.S.B. † (1817 – June 30, 1821)
- Luigi Bovio, O.S.B. † (November 26, 1821 – May 1828)
- Giacomo Diez, O.S.B. † (June 12, 1828 – May 1834)
- Celestino Gonzaga, O.S.B. † (May 1834 – May 1840)
- Matteo Morso, O.S.B. † (May 1840 – November 11, 1840)
- Giuseppe Frisari, O.S.B. † (1841 – 1849)
- Michelangelo Celesia, O.S.B. † (March 25, 1850 – March 23, 1860; transferred to the Diocese of Patti)
- Simplicio Pappalettere, O.S.B. † (April 1858 – 1863)
- Carlo Maria de Vera, O.S.B. † (1863 – 1871)
- Nicola d'Orgemont, O.S.B. † (1872 – June 23, 1896)
- Giuseppe Quandel, O.S.B. † (1896 – February 27, 1897)
- Bonifacio Maria Krug, O.S.B. † (March 9, 1897 – July 4, 1909, deceased)
- Gregorio Diamare, O.S.B. † (July 20, 1909 – September 6, 1945, deceased)
- Ildefonso Rea, O.S.B. † (confirmed November 21, 1945 – retired April 17, 1971)
- Martino Matronola, O.S.B. † (May 24, 1971 – retired January 8, 1983)
- Fabio Bernardo D'Onorio, O.S.B. (April 25, 1983 – September 20, 2007), transferred to the Archdiocese of Gaeta
- Pietro Vittorelli, O.S.B. † (November 17, 2007 – resigned June 12, 2013)
- Donato Ogliari, O.S.B. (October 23, 2014 – June 8, 2022), appointed Abbot of Saint Paul Outside the Walls
- Antonio Luca Fallica, O.S.B., since 9 January 2023
