= Ummidia gens =

Ancient Roman family

The gens Ummidia was a Roman family which flourished during the first and second centuries. The first member of the gens to achieve prominence was Gaius Ummidius Durmius Quadratus, governor of Syria during the reigns of Claudius and Nero. The Ummidii held several consulships in the second century, and through the marriage of Gaius Ummidius Quadratus Annianus Verus they were related to the emperor Marcus Aurelius.

== Origin ==
The Ummidii were a minor family, apparently not of any great antiquity, and was not familiar to contemporary writers. The nomen Ummidius is given in various forms by different authors. Josephus writes it as Numidius, while in different editions of Tacitus, Pliny, and the authors of the Historia Augusta, it is written as Numidius, Vindius, and Ummidius. The latter occurs in some of the best manuscripts, and in inscriptions. The name is mentioned by the poet Horace, where again different manuscripts give it variously, but it appears that the original reading was Ummidius.

The family probably came from the town of Casinum, in Latium adiectum, where an inscription mentions Ummidia Quadratilla, who funded the building of an amphitheater and a temple for the townspeople. In this case, the Ummidii may have been of Volscian origin, although the antiquarian Varro believed the inhabitants of Casinum to be Samnite.

== Praenomina ==
The only praenomina associated with the Ummidii are Gaius and Marcus; in some manuscripts of Tacitus, Titus is given in place of Gaius, but this appears to be a mistake.

== Branches and cognomina ==
The only family-name of the Ummidii was Quadratus, meaning "square", presumably referring to someone with squarish proportions or angular features. All of the Ummidii known to history bore this surname.

== Members ==
This list includes abbreviated praenomina. For an explanation of this practice, see filiation.

- Gaius Ummidius Quadratus, the father of Gaius Ummidius Durmius Quadratus and Ummidia Quadratilla.
- Gaius Ummidius C. f. Durmius Quadratus, governor of Syria from the reign of Claudius, circa AD 51, to his death in 60. He acquiesced to the deposition of Mithridates, the king of Armenia, by Rhadamistus, who put the king to death in AD 52.
- Ummidia C. f. Quadratilla, probably the sister of Gaius Ummidius Durmius Quadratus, she was a woman of great wealth, who died during the reign of Trajan, bequeathing her estate, including the house formerly inhabited by the jurist Gaius Cassius Longinus, to her grandchildren.
- Gaius Ummidius Quadratus Sertorius Severus, (Note: Long known simply as Ummidius Quadratus, his full name was discovered by Ronald Syme.) a friend and admirer of Pliny the Younger. He was the grandson of Ummidia Quadratilla, and was consul suffectus with the emperor Hadrian, by whom he was later persecuted, in AD 118.
- Gaius Ummidius Quadratus, was a consul suffectus around AD 146. He was born in 110 to Gaius Ummidius Quadratus Sertorius Severus and Ummidia Quadratilla. However, it is possible that Gaius Ummidius Quadratus was adopted by Ummidia. Ummidius Quadratus married Annia Cornificia Faustina in 136, at age 26. They had three children, only two of whom are known by name: Marcus Ummidius Quadratus Annianus, and Ummidia Cornificia Antonia.
- Marcus Ummidius C. f. Quadratus, nephew of Marcus Aurelius, was consul in AD 167 with the emperor Lucius Verus.
- Ummidia C. f. Cornificia Faustina, the niece of Marcus Aurelius.
- Ummidius M. f. C. n. Quadratus, was induced by his cousin, Lucilla, to conspire against her brother, the emperor Commodus. The conspiracy failed, and Quadratus was put to death in AD 183.

== See also ==
- List of Roman gentes

== Bibliography ==
- Quintus Horatius Flaccus (Horace), Satirae (Satires).
- Flavius Josephus, Antiquitates Judaïcae (Antiquities of the Jews), Bellum Judaïcum (The Jewish War).
- Gaius Plinius Caecilius Secundus (Pliny the Younger), Epistulae (Letters).
- Publius Cornelius Tacitus, Annales.
- Marcus Aurelius, Meditations.
- Lucius Cassius Dio Cocceianus (Cassius Dio), Roman History.
- Herodianus, History of the Empire from the Death of Marcus.
- Aelius Lampridius, Aelius Spartianus, Flavius Vopiscus, Julius Capitolinus, Trebellius Pollio, and Vulcatius Gallicanus, Historia Augusta (Augustan History).
- Joseph Hilarius Eckhel, Doctrina Numorum Veterum (The Study of Ancient Coins, 1792–1798).
- Johann Caspar von Orelli, Inscriptionum Latinarum Selectarum Amplissima Collectio (An Extensive Collection of Select Latin Inscriptions), Orell Füssli, Zürich (1828).
- Dictionary of Greek and Roman Biography and Mythology, William Smith, ed., Little, Brown and Company, Boston (1849).
- Encyclopædia Britannica, Eleventh Edition (1911).
- D.P. Simpson, Cassell's Latin and English Dictionary, Macmillan Publishing Company, New York (1963).
- Anthony R. Birley, Marcus Aurelius, B. T. Batsford, London (1966).
- Ronald Syme, "The Ummidii", in Historia: Zeitschrift für Alte Geschichte, vol. 17, pp. 88–92 (1968), "Ummidius Quadratus. Capax Imperii", in Harvard Studies in Classical Philology, vol. 83 (1979).
