= Gaius Ummidius Quadratus =

Roman senator, consul suffectus around 146CE

Gaius Ummidius Quadratus Annianus Verus was a consul suffectus around the year 146 CE.

== Family ==
He was born in 110 to Gaius Ummidius Quadratus Sertorius Severus and Ummidia Quadratilla. However, it is possible that he was adopted by Ummidia. Ummidius Quadratus married Annia Cornificia Faustina in 136, at age 26. They had three children, only two of whom are known by name: Marcus Ummidius Quadratus Annianus, and Ummidia Cornificia Antonia.
