= Red Poppies on Monte Cassino =

- Author: Feliks Konarski
- Language: Polish
- Genre: Poetry and lyrics
- Publisher: LTW, Lomianki
- Publication date: 2004
- Publication place: Poland
- ISBN: 9788375653465

You may also be looking for the song The Red Poppies on Monte Cassino.

The Red Poppies on Monte Cassino - poems and songs 1939–1945 (Polish: Czerwone Maki na Monte Cassino. Wiersze i piosenki 1939–1945) is the title of a collection of period works by Feliks Konarski (pseudonym: Ref-Ren).

The book's title, "Czerwone Maki", is also the name of one of the most famous Polish songs to emerge from World War II.

== Content ==
Konarski moved to Lwów in 1934, establishing a theater group, writing songs, and performed with a traveling orchestra in the USSR. He was in Moscow when the Nazis attacked Poland, and enlisted in the Polish Armed Forces in the East. Evacuated to Iran, he headed the Polish Soldier's Theater before serving in the Polish Second Corps in Italy.

Konarski began to write poems and songs after a two-year break. He wrote regularly, but rarely published his works. This book contains the works written after Konarski joined the Polish Second Corps in December 1941.

Led by General Władysław Anders, the Polish Second Corps stormed the strategic Abbey on Monte Cassino. On the eve of this decisive battle, also known as the Battle for Rome, Konarski wrote the book's title work, "The Red Poppies on Monte Cassino". It has combative and emotional words. The song became an unofficial national anthem during the communist occupation of Poland, and it was banned in Polish People's Republic during the 1950s.

Konarski began to write poems and songs after a two-year break. He wrote regularly, but rarely published his works. This book contains the works written after Konarski joined the Polish Second Corps. His works in this book are arranged as a chronicle of the tragic fate and the combat roles taken by the Polish Second Corps.

The book's cover shows the image of the Black Madonna of Częstochowa, a holy icon of the Virgin Mary, that is both Poland's most sacred relic and one of the country's national symbols, looking over the remaining ruins of the famous Abbey of Monte Cassino after the battle.
