= Feliks Konarski =

Polish poet, songwriter and cabaret performer

- Born: 9 January 1907; Kiev, Russian Empire
- Died: 12 September 1991 (aged 84); Chicago, U.S.
- Resting place: Niles
- Occupations: Poet, songwriter, cabaret performer
- Spouse: Nina Oleńska
- Writing career
- Pen name: Ref-Ren
- Language: Polish
- Notable work: Red Poppies on Monte Cassino
- Notable awards: Polonia Restituta

Feliks Konarski (pseudonym: Ref-Ren; 9 January 1907 – 12 September 1991) was a Polish poet, songwriter, and cabaret performer.

== Early life ==
Konarski was born in Kiev and attended a Polish school there. In 1921, he was able to get to Poland by foot. He passed his matura (final exams) in Warsaw. He began to study Polish at Warsaw University, but found his calling on stage. A deciding point was encountering Konrad Tom, who helped Konarski begin authoring poems and songs, as well as suggesting the "Ref-Ren" stage pseudonym. In addition to songs, Konarski also wrote satirical plays for theater groups. In 1931, he married the actress Nina Oleńska.

In 1934, Konarski moved to Lwów (then in the Second Polish Republic, now Lviv in Ukraine) where he established a theatre group. He wrote many poems as well as words to what became numerous popular songs.

After Lwów was taken over by the Red Army, Konarski performed as part of a traveling orchestra in numerous cities in the Soviet Union. When Nazi Germany attacked, he was in Moscow. In 1941, he enlisted with the Polish Armed Forces in the East.

== War service ==
During World War II, he served with General Władysław Anders' Polish Second Corps in Italy. There, literally on the eve of the Poles' victorious storming of Monte Cassino, he wrote the anthem Czerwone maki na Monte Cassino (The Red Poppies on Monte Cassino). At the time of the battle, the mountain terrain of Monte Cassino was covered with red poppy flowers at the peak of their bloom. Afterwards, the poppy flowers became a deeper red in color because they were nourished by the blood of Polish soldiers that died during the famous battle.

This song, set to music that same night by Alfred Schütz, became Konarski's most famous composition, served to maintain his compatriots' spirits in one of Poland's darkest hours, and after the war was banned in Poland under communist rule. The song became an unofficial anthem and, when it was played, many people stood at attention.

Text of Czerwone maki na Monte Cassino ('The Red Poppies on Monte Cassino') — refrain, in English and Polish:

Czerwone maki na Monte Cassino
Zamiast rosy piły polską krew...
Po tych makach szedł żołnierz i ginął,
Lecz od śmierci silniejszy był gniew!
Przejdą lata i wieki przeminą,
Pozostaną ślady dawnych dni!..
I tylko maki na Monte Cassino
Czerwieńsze będą, bo z polskiej wzrosną krwi.

Translation:

Red poppies on Monte Cassino,
Instead of dew, drank Polish blood.
As the soldier crushed them in falling,
For the anger was more potent than death.
Years will pass and ages will roll,
But traces of bygone days will stay,
And the poppies on Monte Cassino
Will be redder having quaffed Polish blood.

== Exile ==
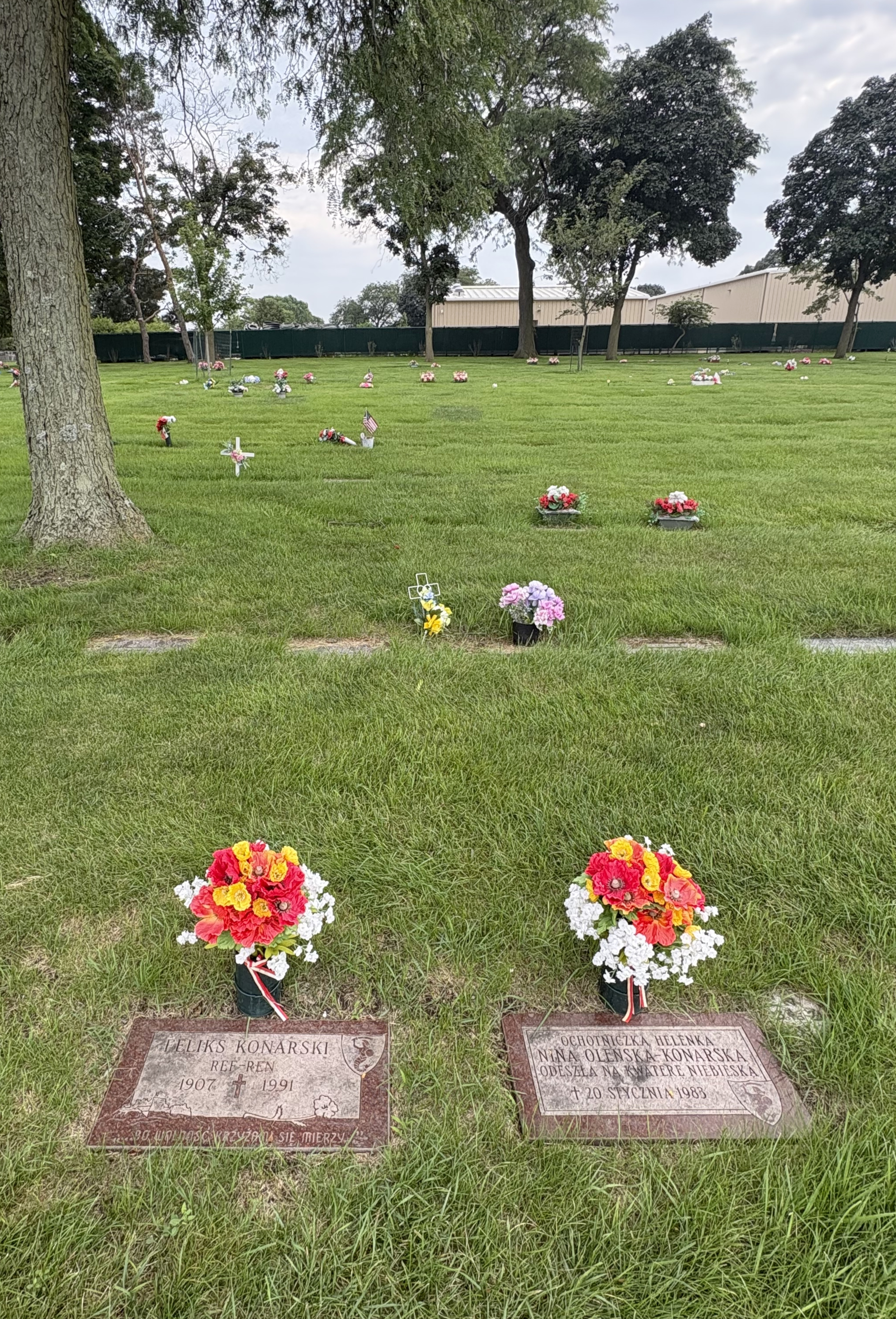
Konarski's grave at Maryhill Catholic Cemetery

He was evacuated to Iran where he headed the Polish Soldier's Theater. He was with the Polish Second Corps until it was transported to Britain and demobilized. In the autumn of 1946, he went to London where he organized and conducted the Ref-Ren Theater. Together with his wife and other exiled Polish actors, the theater traveled around the world providing humor and sentimental songs to war scattered Poles. In the 1950s, and 1960s, he recorded several dozen of these broadcasts for Radio Free Europe, the Polish section of Radio Paris, and the Polish section of the BBC in London.

In 1965, Konarski settled permanently in Chicago. He organized Polish cultural activities and had a radio show called Czerwone maki (Red Poppies) for over twenty years that was also broadcast in New York City. He also continued to sing and perform on many stages in England, France, and the U.S.

Although he is best known for writing the "Red Poppies on Monte Cassino" song, Konarski was also an author and composer of hundreds of other poems, songs, monologues, skits, musical comedies (including "December" in 1981), as well as special programs to commemorate Polish veterans and national holidays.

Settling with his wife in Chicago in the 1960s, they travelled to many U.S. cities entertaining Polish emigrants with his stage shows. His entertainers met with and entertained his fellow soldiers of the Polish II Corps who fought with at Monte Cassino. During the 1960s, he and his wife taughts summer courses of Polish language, song and poetry at Alliance College in Pennsylvania, having a passionate influence on first and second generation Polish teens.

He added a fourth verse to his Czerwone maki na Monte Cassino song in 1969, on the twenty-fifth anniversary of the battle. It is less known than the original version.

Konarski died in 1991 and was buried at Maryhill Catholic Cemetery in Niles, Illinois.

For his attitude for the nation's independence and for cultivating Polish culture in exile, he was twice awarded the Order of Polonia Restituta (Knight's Cross and Commander's Cross), first by the President of Poland in exile, and then posthumously.

== See also ==
- List of Poles
