= Gaius Ummidius Actius Anicetus =

- Occupation: Pantomime actor

Gaius Ummidius Actius Anicetus was a Roman pantomime actor who lived in Pompeii.

Actius is attested in an inscription from Puteoli that identifies him as a pantomime actor. The possibility has been raised that Actius may be the freedman (libertus) of Ummidia Quadratilla who is discussed in the letters of Pliny the Younger. Various graffiti found at Pompeii record praise for Actius. These include:

- "Actius, master of stage performers." from tomb 4 in the Fondo Pacifico near the amphitheater of Pompeii
- "Actius, greetings." from the large theater at Pompeii
- a possible mention of Actius from Herculaneum: "Lucius Actius, hail. Mysticus, the musician, of the comedian Icuus ... we were for you."

An actor named Actius also appears in Unit 1, Stage 5 of the Cambridge Latin Course.
