= Monte Cassino =

Benedictine monastery in Lazio, Italy

Monte Cassino Abbey
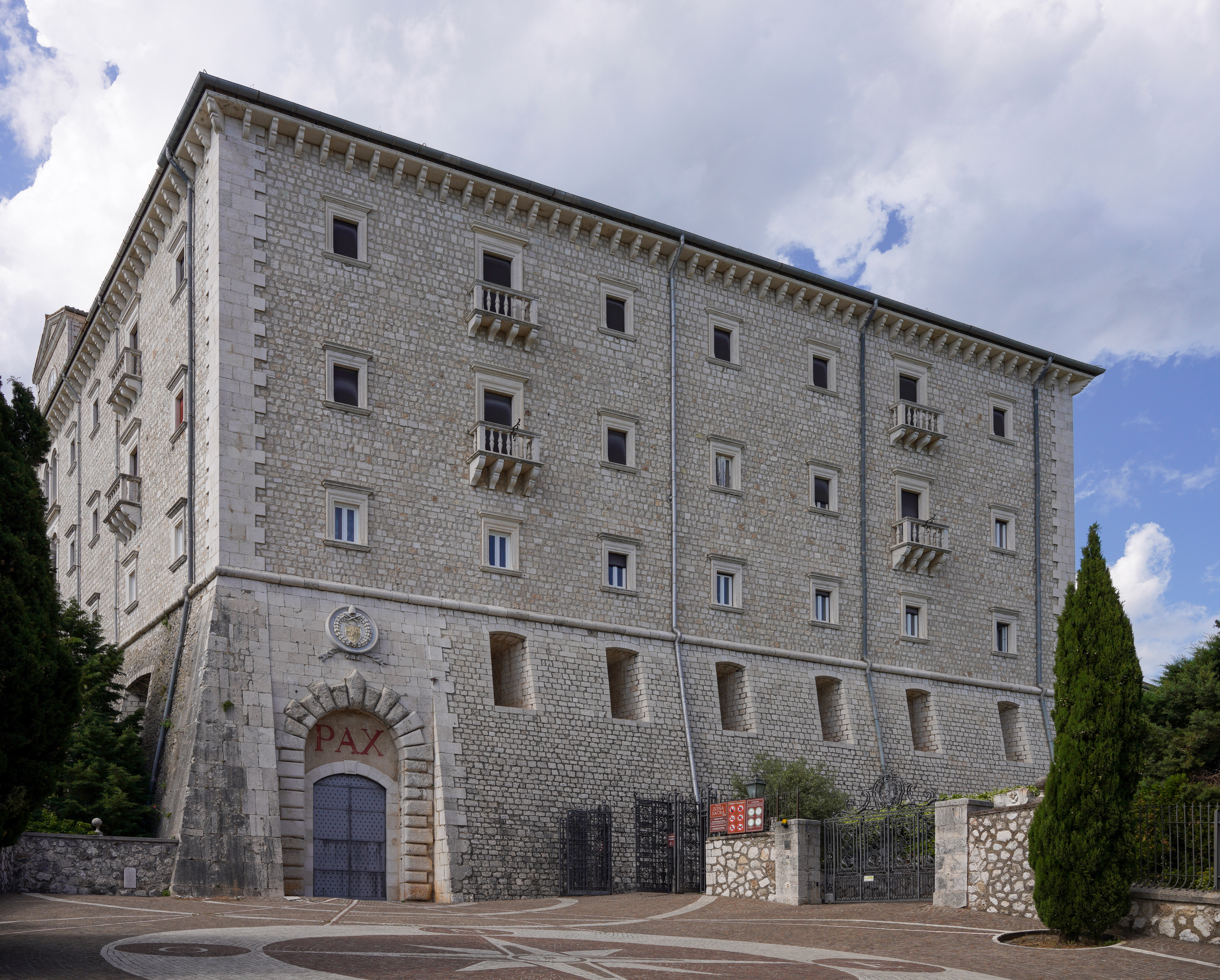
- Abbey of Monte Cassino

- Location within Italy

Monastery information
- Order: Benedictine
- Established: AD 529
- Diocese: Diocese of Monte Cassino

People
- Founder: Benedict of Nursia
- Abbot: Antonio Luca Fallica OSB

Site
- Location: Cassino, Italy
- Coordinates: 41°29′24″N 13°48′50″E
- Public access: Yes

The Abbey of Monte Cassino (today usually spelled Montecassino) is a Benedictine monastery on a rocky hill about 130 kilometres (80 mi) southeast of Rome and 105 kilometres (65 mi) north of Naples. Located on the site of the ancient Roman town of Casinum, it is the first house of the Benedictine Order, having been established by Benedict of Nursia himself around 529. It was for the community of Monte Cassino that the Rule of Saint Benedict was composed.

The first monastery on Monte Cassino was sacked by the invading Lombards around 570 and abandoned. Of the first monastery almost nothing is known. The second monastery was established by Petronax of Brescia around 718, at the suggestion of Pope Gregory II and with the support of the Lombard Duke Romuald II of Benevento. It was directly subject to the pope and many monasteries in Italy were under its authority. In 883, the monastery was sacked by Saracens and abandoned again. The community of monks resided first at Teano and then from 914 at Capua before the monastery was rebuilt in 949. During the period of exile, the Cluniac Reforms were introduced into the community.

The 11th and 12th centuries were the abbey's golden age. It acquired a large secular territory around Monte Cassino, the so-called Terra Sancti Benedicti ("Land of Saint Benedict"), which it heavily fortified with castles. It maintained good relations with the Eastern Church, even receiving patronage from Byzantine emperors. It encouraged fine art and craftsmanship by employing Byzantine artisans. In 1057, Pope Victor II recognised the abbot of Monte Cassino as having precedence over all other abbots. Many monks rose to become bishops and cardinals, and three popes were drawn from the abbey: Stephen IX (1057–58), Victor III (1086–87) and Gelasius II (1118–19). During this period, a monastic chronicle, Chronica sacri monasterii casinensis, was written by two of its own, Cardinal Leo of Ostia and Peter the Deacon (who also compiled the cartulary).

By the 13th century, the monastery's decline had set in. In 1239, Emperor Frederick II garrisoned troops in it during his war with the Papacy. In 1322, Pope John XXII elevated the abbey into a bishopric but this was suppressed in 1367. The buildings were destroyed by an earthquake in 1349, and in 1369 Pope Urban V demanded a contribution from all Benedictine monasteries to fund the rebuilding. In 1454, the abbey was placed in commendam and in 1504 was made subject to the Abbey of Santa Giustina in Padua.

In 1799, Monte Cassino was sacked again by French troops during the French Revolutionary Wars. The abbey was dissolved by the Italian government in 1866. The building became a national monument with the monks as custodians of its treasures. In 1944, during World War II, it was the site of the Battle of Monte Cassino, when the building was destroyed by Allied bombing. It was rebuilt after the war.

After the reforms of the Second Vatican Council the monastery was one of the few remaining territorial abbeys within the Catholic Church. On 23 October 2014, Pope Francis applied the norms of the motu proprio Ecclesia Catholica of Paul VI (1976) to the abbey, removing from its jurisdiction all 53 parishes and reducing its spiritual jurisdiction to the abbey itself – while retaining its status as a territorial abbey. The former territory of the Abbey, except the land on which the abbey church and monastery sit, was transferred to the diocese of Sora-Cassino-Aquino-Pontecorvo. Pope Francis at the same time appointed Father Donato Ogliari as the new Abbot who will serve as the 192nd successor of Saint Benedict. As of 2015, the monastic community consists of 13 monks. Ogliari was succeeded as abbot by Antonio Luca Fallica in 2023.

== History ==
=== Ancient history ===
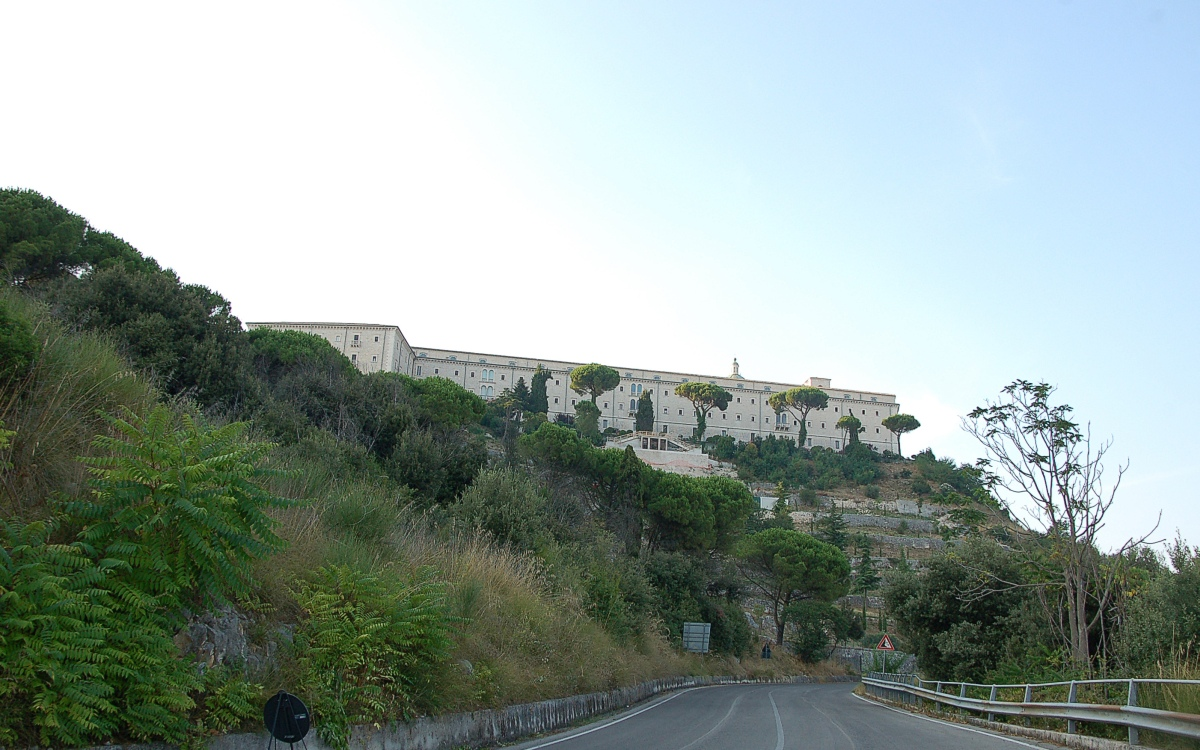
Cliff on "high mountain"

The history of Monte Cassino is linked to the nearby town of Cassino which was first settled in the fifth century BC by the Volsci people who held much of central Italy. It was they who first built a citadel on the summit of Monte Cassino. The Volsci in the area were defeated by the Romans in 312 BC. The Romans named the settlement Casinum and built a temple to Apollo at the citadel. Modern excavations have found no remains of the temple, but monumental remains of an amphitheatre, a theatre, and a mausoleum show the wealth of the Roman town.

Generations after the Roman Empire adopted Christianity the town became the seat of a bishopric in the fifth century AD. Lacking strong defences the area was subject to barbarian attack and became abandoned and neglected with only a few struggling inhabitants holding out.

=== Era of Benedict (530–547) ===
According to Gregory the Great's hagiography of Benedict, the Life of Saint Benedict of Nursia, the monastery was constructed on an older pagan site, a temple of Apollo that crowned the hill. The biography records that the area was still largely pagan at the time; Benedict's first act was to smash the sculpture of Apollo and destroy the altar. He then reused the temple, dedicating it to Saint Martin, and built another chapel on the site of the altar dedicated to Saint John the Baptist.

Pope Gregory I's account of Benedict's seizure of Monte Cassino:

Now the citadel called Casinum is located on the side of a high mountain. The mountain shelters this citadel on a broad bench. Then it rises three miles above it as if its peak tended toward heaven. There was an ancient temple there in which Apollo used to be worshipped according to the old pagan rite by the foolish local farmers. Around it had grown up a grove dedicated to demon worship, where even at that time a wild crowd still devoted themselves to unholy sacrifices. When [Benedict] the man of God arrived, he smashed the idol, overturned the altar and cut down the grove of trees. He built a chapel dedicated to St. Martin in the temple of Apollo and another to St. John where the altar of Apollo had stood. And he summoned the people of the district to the faith by his unceasing preaching.

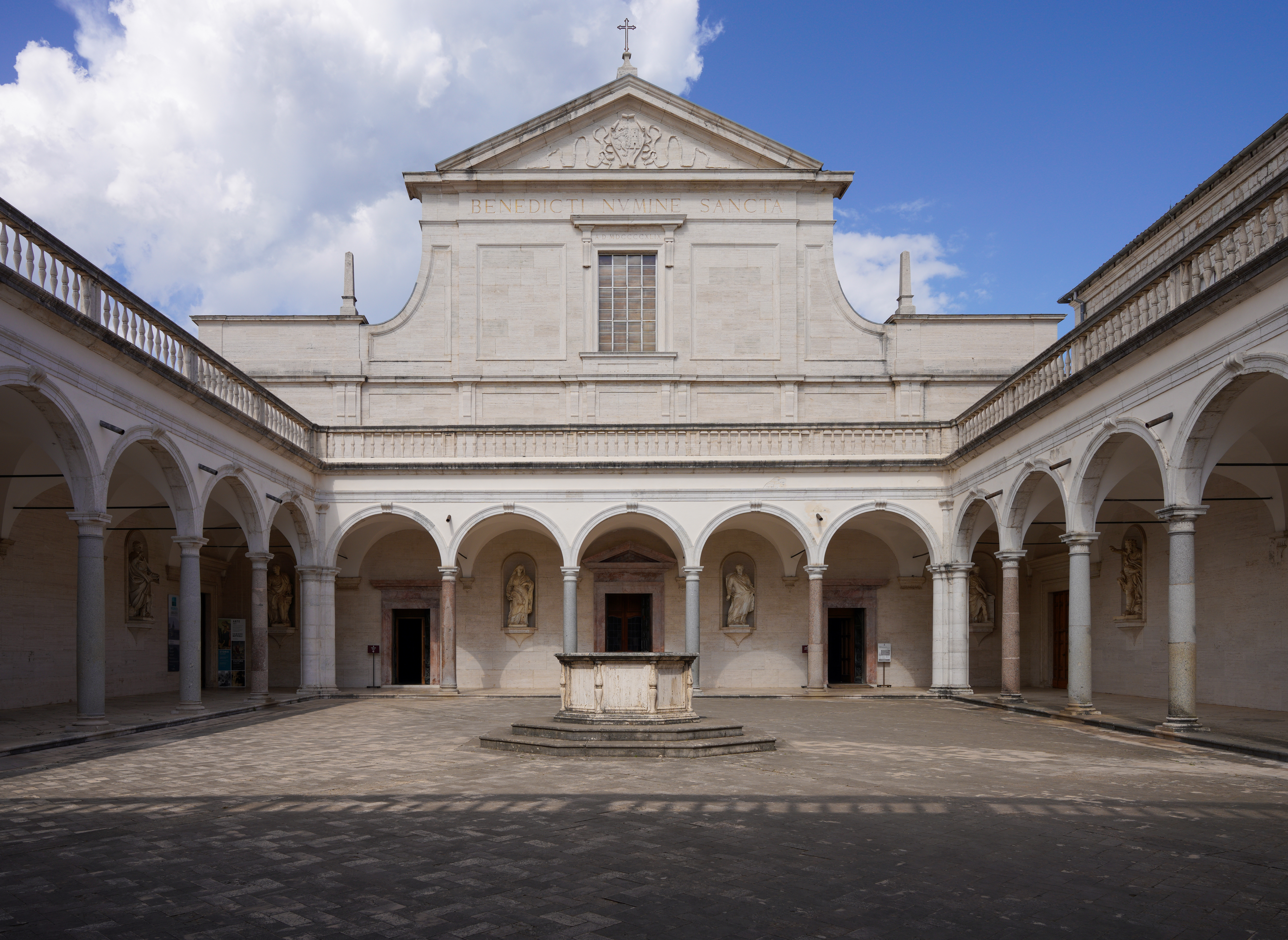
The façade of the cathedral

Pope Gregory I's biography of Benedict claims that Satan opposed the monks repurposing the site. In one story, Satan invisibly sits on a rock making it too heavy to remove until Benedict drives him off. In another story, Satan taunts Benedict and then collapses a wall on a young monk, who is brought back to life by Benedict. Pope Gregory also relays that the monks found a pagan idol of bronze when digging at the site (which when thrown into the kitchen gave the illusion of a fire until dispelled by Benedict).

Archaeologist Neil Christie notes that it was common in such hagiographies for the protagonist to encounter areas of strong paganism. Benedict scholar Terrence Kardong examines why Benedict did not face stiffer opposition in his seizure of the site from the local pagans. He contrasts this with the 25-year struggle faced by St. Martin of Tours in western Gaul by pagans angry at his attacks on their shrines: "By the time of Benedict, paganism was in a weaker condition in western Europe than it had been in Martin's time. And, of course, it must be remembered that Martin as a bishop was a much more prominent churchman than Benedict. This was an isolated and unusual episode in Benedict's monastic career. Martin, however, was thrust out of his monastery into the role of a missionary bishop in the fourth century."

Benedict scholars (such as Adalbert de Vogüé and Terrence Kardong) note the heavy influence of Sulpicius Severus' Life of Martin on Pope Gregory I's biography of Benedict, including the account of his seizure of Monte Cassino. Benedict's violence against a pagan holy place recalls both Martin's assault against pagan shrines generations before and the Biblical story of conquering Israel entering the Holy Land (see Exodus 34:12–14). De Vogue writes "this mountain had to be conquered from an idolatrous people and purified from its devilish horrors. And like conquering Israel, Benedict came precisely to carry out this purification. No doubt Gregory had this biblical model uppermost in his mind, as is clear from the terms he uses to describe the work of destruction. At the same time, neither Gregory nor Benedict could have forgotten the similar line of action taken by St. Martin against the pagan shrines of Gaul."

Pope Gregory I's account of Benedict at Monte Cassino is seen by scholars as the final setting for an epic set in motion at Subiaco. In his earlier setting Benedict "had twice shown complete mastery over his aggressiveness, Benedict is now allowed to use it without restraint in the service of God." Scholars note that this striking contrast is not stressed by Gregory but rather both settings are portrayed as part of a single battle account against the same demonic enemy. Where Satan concealed himself behind underlings at Subiaco, at Monte Cassino he drops the masks to enter into a desperate attempt to prevent an abbey from being built, and "that the sole cause of this eruption of satanic action is the suppression of pagan worship on the high places."

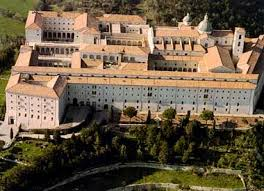
Aerial view

While scholars see some similarities between the story of Benedict's encountering demonic phenomena and diabolic apparitions at Monte Cassino with the story of Saint Anthony the Great's temptation in the desert, the influence of the story of St. Martin is dominant – with the resistance of Satan substituting for Martin's outraged pagan populace. Unlike the stories that may have influenced Pope Gregory's structure of the biography, Benedict's victories are practical, preventing Satan from stopping work on the abbey at Monte Cassino. Benedict's prayers are portrayed as the driving force behind the building of the abbey and the triumphs over Satan, through prayer: "Benedict the monk wrests from the devil a well-determined base which he never leaves." After the completion of the abbey, Satan's appearances in the story diminish back to the same level as Subiaco, "Only after the saint's death and by God's permission would other enemies, the Lombards, succeed in sacking it."Once established at Monte Cassino, Benedict never left. He wrote the Benedictine Rule that became the founding principle for Western monasticism, received a visit from Totila, king of the Ostrogoths (perhaps in 543, the only remotely secure historical date for Benedict), and died there. According to accounts, "Benedict died in the oratory of St. Martin, and was buried in the oratory of St. John."

The Rule of St. Benedict mandated the moral obligations to care for the sick. So in Monte Cassino St. Benedict founded a hospital that is considered today to have been the first in Europe of the new era. Benedictine monks took care of the sick and wounded there according to Benedict's Rule. The monastic routine called for hard work. The care of the sick was such an important duty that those caring for them were enjoined to act as if they served Christ directly. Benedict founded twelve communities for monks at nearby Subiaco (about 64 km to the east of Rome), where hospitals were settled, too, as adjuncts to the monasteries to provide charity. Soon many monasteries were founded throughout Europe, and everywhere there were hospitals like those in Monte Cassino.

Pope Gregory I's account of Benedict's construction was confirmed by archaeological discoveries made after the destruction of 1944. Adalbert de Vogüé recounts that "Traces have been found of the oratories of St. Martin and of St. John the Baptist, with additions from the eighth and eleventh centuries, together with their pre-Christian cellars. The first one which Benedict built in the temple itself was only twelve meters long and eight wide. From this, we can infer a fairly small community. The second oratory, on the mountain-top, where the pagan altar had stood in the open air, was of the same width but somewhat longer (15.25 meters)."

=== 580–884 ===
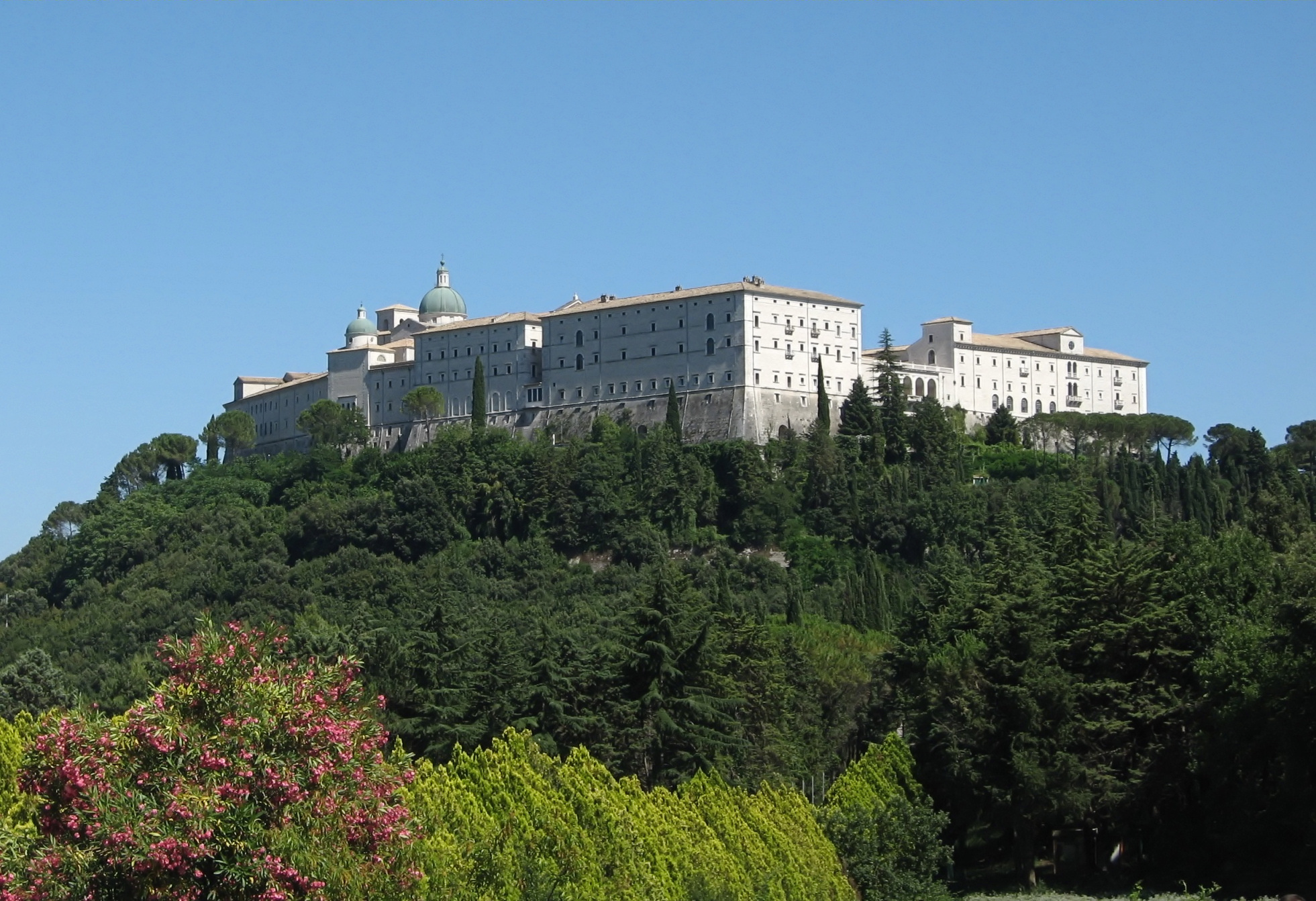
Promontory and post-WWII rebuilt abbey

Monte Cassino became a model for future developments. Its prominent site has always made it an object of strategic importance. It was sacked or destroyed a number of times. "The first to demolish it were Lombards on foot in 580; the last were Allied bombers in 1944." In 581, during the abbacy of Bonitus, the Lombards sacked the abbey, and the surviving monks fled to Rome, where they remained for more than a century. During this time the body of St Benedict was transferred to Fleury, the modern Saint-Benoit-sur-Loire near Orleans, France.

A flourishing period of Monte Cassino followed its re-establishment in 718 by Abbot Petronax, when among the monks were Carloman, son of Charles Martel; Ratchis, predecessor of the Lombard King Aistulf; and Paul the Deacon, the historian of the Lombards.

In 744, a donation of Gisulf II of Benevento created the Terra Sancti Benedicti, the secular lands of the abbacy, which were subject to the abbot and nobody else save the pope. Thus, the monastery became the capital of a state comprising a compact and strategic region between the Lombard principality of Benevento and the Byzantine city-states of the coast (Naples, Gaeta, and Amalfi).

In 884 Saracens sacked and then burned it down, and Abbot Bertharius was killed during the attack. Among the great historians who worked at the monastery, in this period there is Erchempert, whose Historia Langobardorum Beneventanorum is a fundamental chronicle of the ninth-century Mezzogiorno.

=== The abbey under Desiderius ===
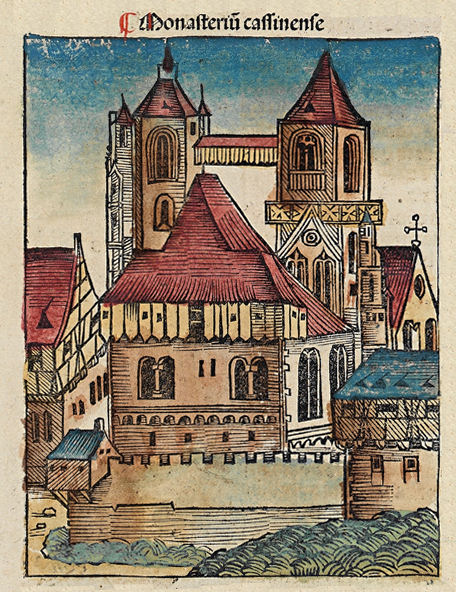
Woodcut of the abbey from the late 15th-century Nuremberg Chronicle (folio 144 recto)

Monte Cassino was rebuilt and reached the apex of its fame in the 11th century under the abbot Desiderius (abbot 1058–1087), who later became Pope Victor III. Monks caring for the patients in Monte Cassino constantly needed new medical knowledge. So they began to buy and collect medical and other books by Greek, Roman, Islamic, Egyptian, European, Jewish, and Oriental authors. As Naples is situated on the crossroad of many seaways of Europe, the Middle East and Asia, soon the monastery library was one of the richest in Europe. All the knowledge of the civilizations of all the times and nations was accumulated in the Abbey of that time. The Benedictines translated into Latin and transcribed precious manuscripts. The number of monks rose to over two hundred, and the library, the manuscripts produced in the scriptorium and the school of manuscript illuminators became famous throughout the West. The unique Beneventan script flourished there during Desiderius' abbacy. Monks reading and copying the medical texts learned a lot about human anatomy and methods of treatment, and then put their theoretic skills into practice at monastery hospital. By the 10–11th centuries Monte Cassino became the most famous cultural, educational, and medical center of Europe with a great library in Medicine and other sciences. Many physicians came there for medical and other knowledge. That is why the first High Medical School in the world was soon opened in nearby Salerno which is considered today to have been the earliest Institution of Higher Education in Western Europe. This school found its original base in the Benedictine Abbey of Monte Cassino still in the 9th century and later settled down in Salerno. So, Montecassino and Benedictines played a great role in the progress of medicine and science in the Middle Ages, and with his life and work St. Benedict himself exercised a fundamental influence on the development of European civilization and culture and helped Europe to emerge from the "dark night of history" that followed the fall of the Roman empire.

The buildings of the monastery were reconstructed in the 11th century on a scale of great magnificence, artists being brought from Amalfi, Lombardy, and even Constantinople to supervise the various works. The abbey church, rebuilt and decorated with the utmost splendor, was consecrated in 1071 by Pope Alexander II. A detailed account of the abbey at this date exists in the Chronica monasterii Cassinensis by Leo of Ostia and Amatus of Monte Cassino gives us our best source on the early Normans in the south.

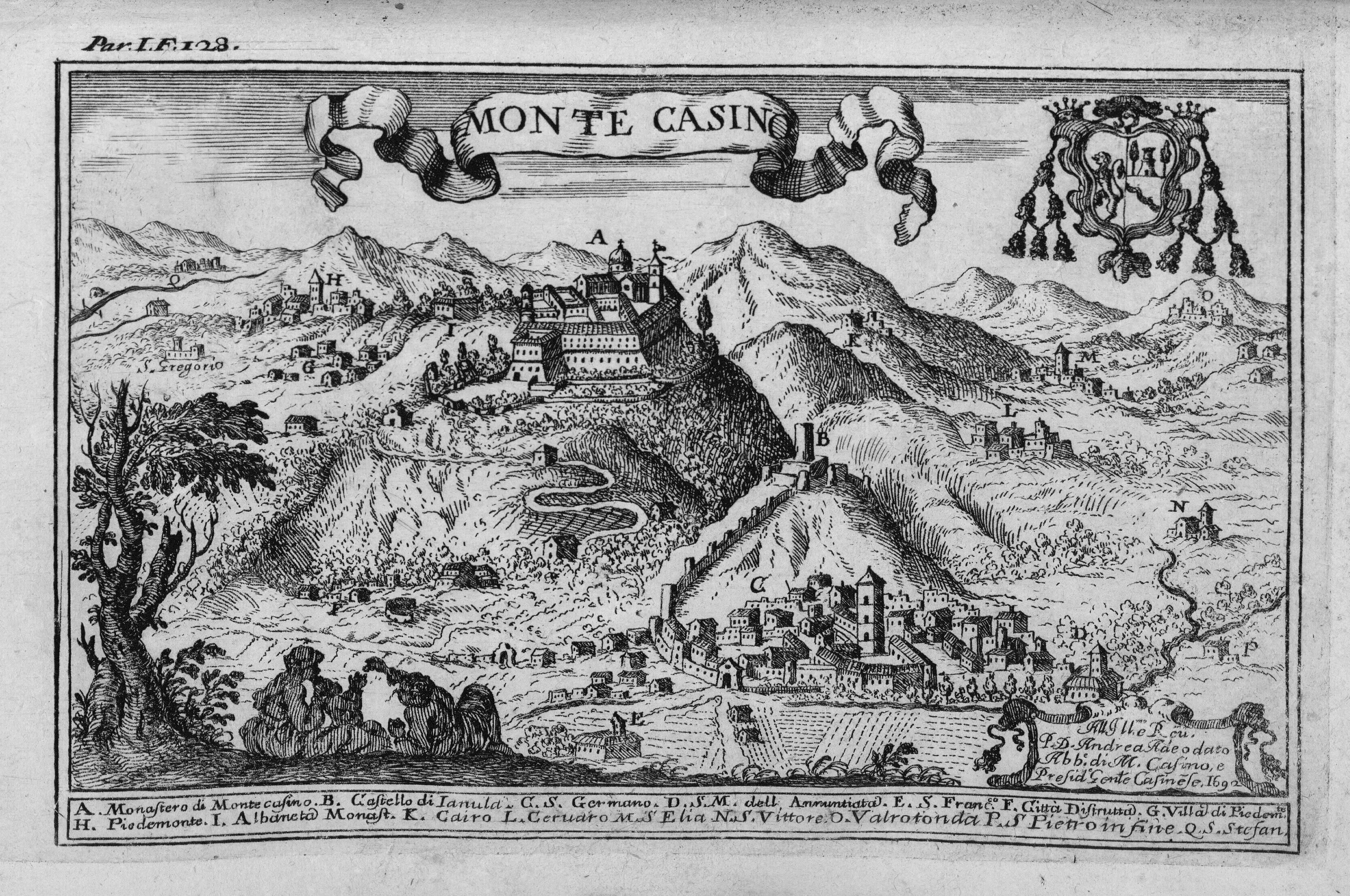
The abbey in depicted in Giovan Battista Pacichelli's 1703 Il regno di Napoli in prospettiva

Abbot Desiderius sent envoys to Constantinople some time after 1066 to hire expert Byzantine mosaicists for the decoration of the rebuilt abbey church. According to chronicler Leo of Ostia the Greek artists decorated the apse, the arch and the vestibule of the basilica. Their work was admired by contemporaries but was totally destroyed in later centuries except two fragments depicting greyhounds (now in the Monte Cassino Museum). "The abbot in his wisdom decided that a great number of young monks in the monastery should be thoroughly initiated in these arts" – says the chronicler about the role of the Greeks in the revival of mosaic art in medieval Italy.

Architectural historian Kenneth John Conant believed that Desiderius' rebuilding included pointed arches, and served as a major influence in the nascent development of Gothic architecture. Abbot Hugh of Cluny visited Monte Cassino in 1083, and five years later he began to build the third church at Cluny Abbey, which then included pointed arches and became a major turning point in medieval architecture.

=== Later history ===
An earthquake damaged the Abbey in 1349, and although the site was rebuilt it marked the beginning of a long period of decline. In 1321, Pope John XXII made the church of Monte Cassino a cathedral, and the carefully preserved independence of the monastery from episcopal interference was at an end. That situation was reversed by Pope Urban V, a Benedictine, in 1367. In 1505 the monastery was joined with that of St. Justina of Padua.

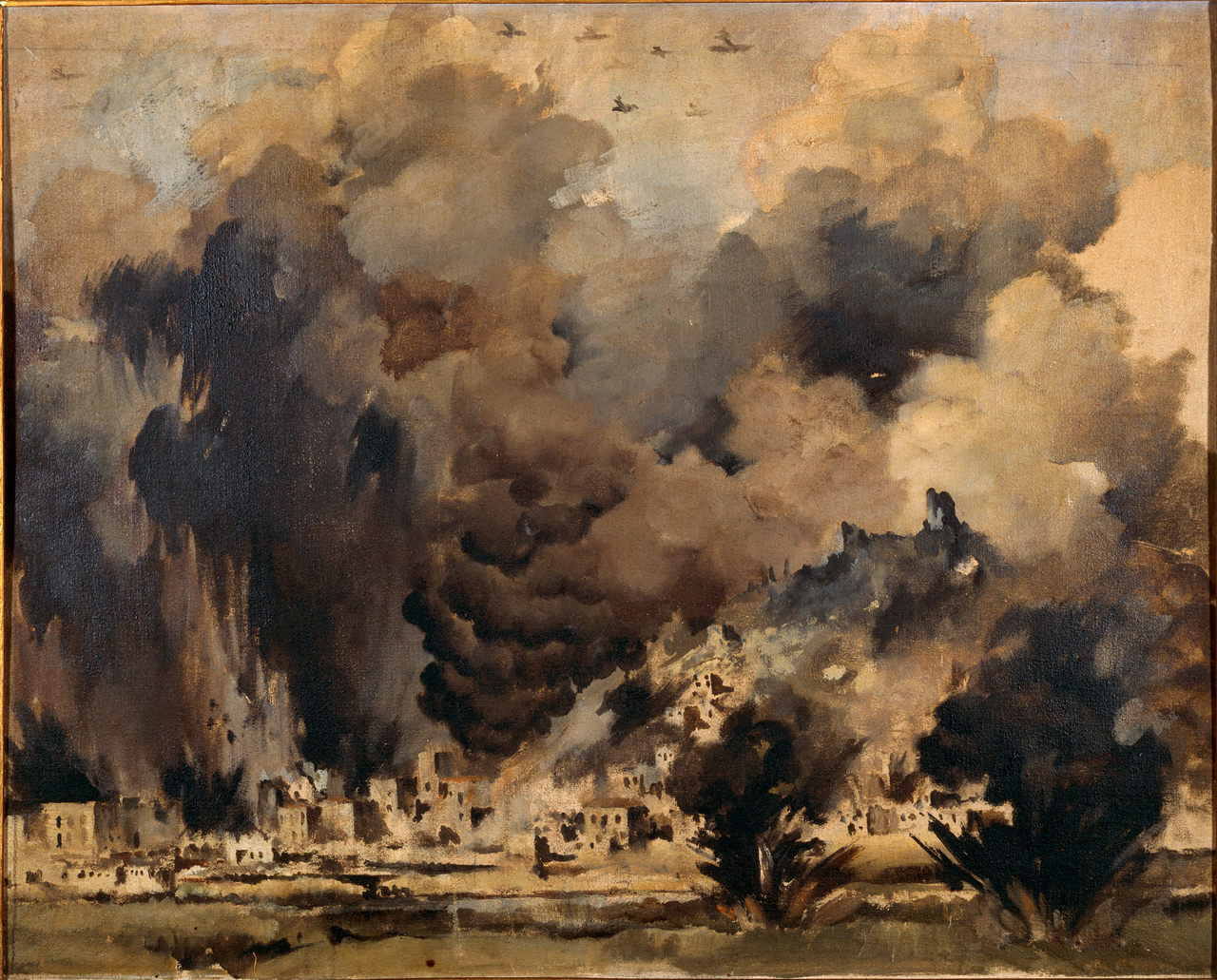
Air assault on Monte Cassino, 15 February 1944, painted by Peter McIntyre, an official war artist of New Zealand during WWII

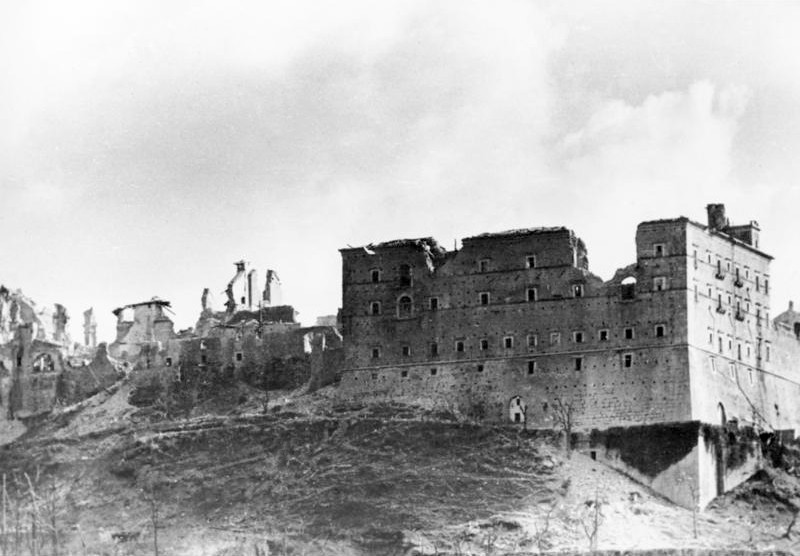
Monte Cassino in ruins after Allied bombing in February 1944

The abbey was sacked by the French Revolutionary Army in 1799. From the dissolution of the Italian monasteries in 1866, Monte Cassino became a national monument.

=== Battle of Monte Cassino ===
In the Italian Campaign of World War II the town of Cassino formed part of the German forces' 161-kilometre (100-mile) Gustav Line, which aimed to prevent Allied troops from advancing northwards. The abbey itself however, was not initially utilised by the German troops as part of their fortifications, owing to General Kesselring's regard for the historical monument. The Gustav Line stretched from the Tyrrhenian to the Adriatic coast in the east, with Monte Cassino itself overlooking Highway 6 and blocking the path to Rome.

During the Battle of Monte Cassino (January–May 1944) the abbey was heavily damaged. On 15 February 1944 it was nearly destroyed in a series of heavy, American-led air raids. General Sir Harold Alexander, with the support of numerous Allied commanders, ordered the bombing, which was conducted due to several reports from British Indian Army officers suggesting that German forces were occupying the monastery; the abbey was considered a key observation post by all those who were fighting in the field. However, during the bombing no German troops were present in the abbey. Subsequent investigations found that the only people killed in the monastery by the bombing were 230 Italian civilians seeking refuge there. Following the bombing the ruins of the monastery were occupied by German Fallschirmjäger paratroopers of the 1st Parachute Division, due to the ruins providing excellent defensive cover.

=== Postwar history ===
The Abbey was rebuilt after the war. In the early 1950s, President of the Italian Republic Luigi Einaudi gave considerable support to the rebuilding. Pope Paul VI consecrated the rebuilt Basilica on 24 October 1964. During reconstruction, the abbey library was housed at the Pontifical Abbey of St Jerome-in-the-City. Until his resignation was accepted by Pope Francis on 12 June 2013, the Territorial Abbot of Monte Cassino was Pietro Vittorelli. The Vatican daily bulletin of 23 October 2014 announced that with the appointment of his successor Donato Ogliari, the territory of the abbey outside the immediate monastery grounds had been transferred to the Diocese of Sora-Aquino-Pontecorvo, now renamed Diocese of Sora-Cassino-Aquino-Pontecorvo.

== Gallery ==
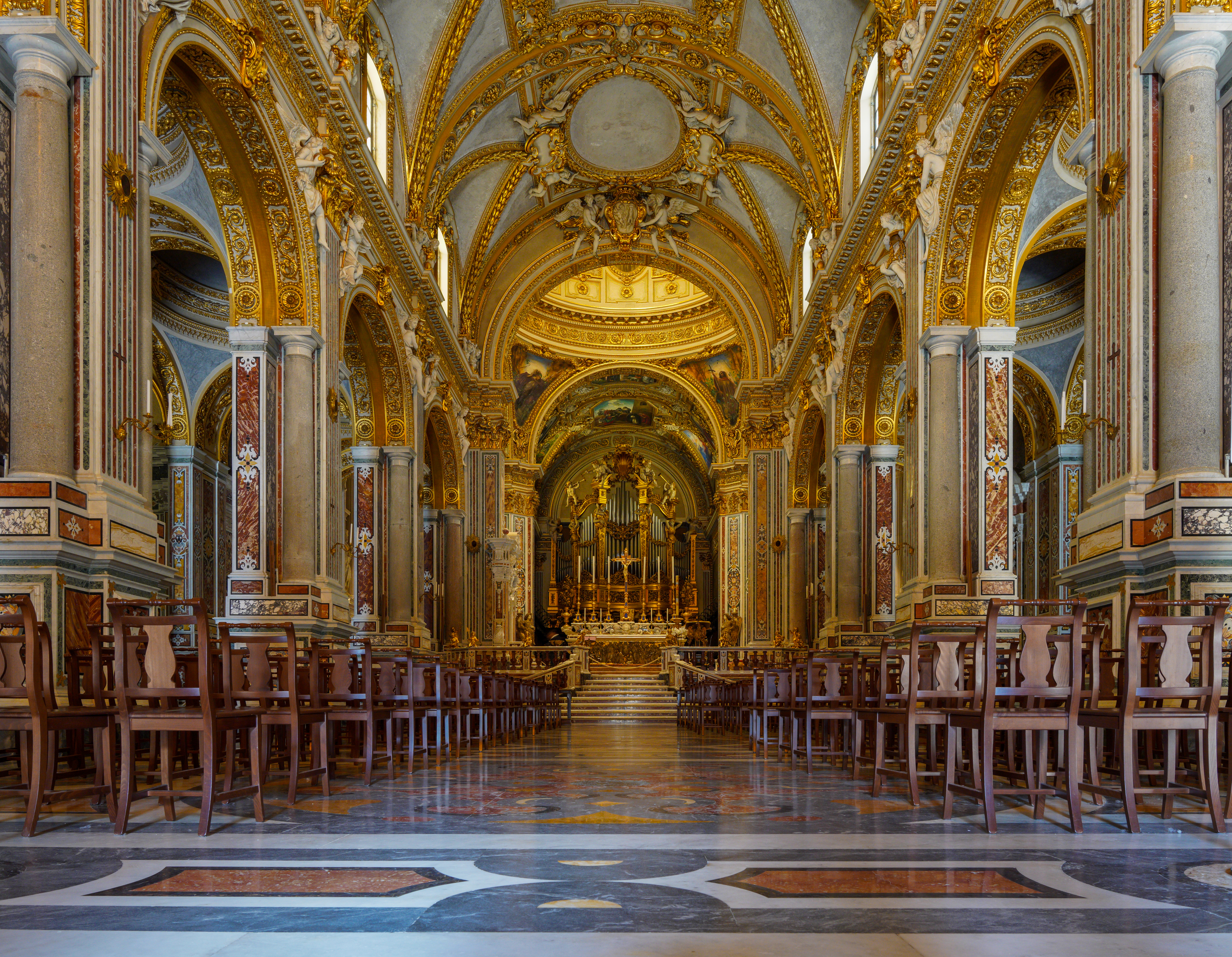
Monte Cassino Cathedral Nave

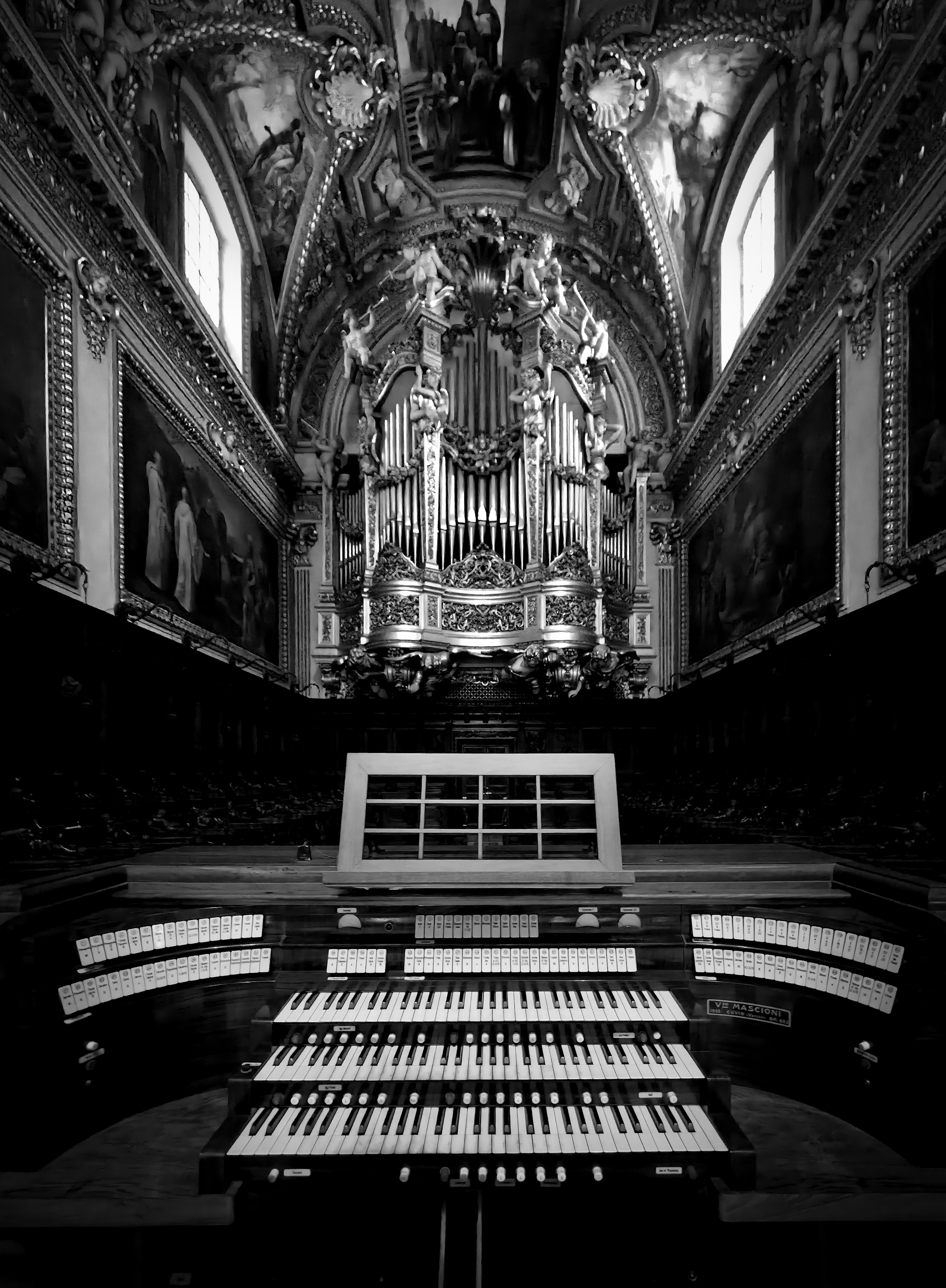
Choir Organ

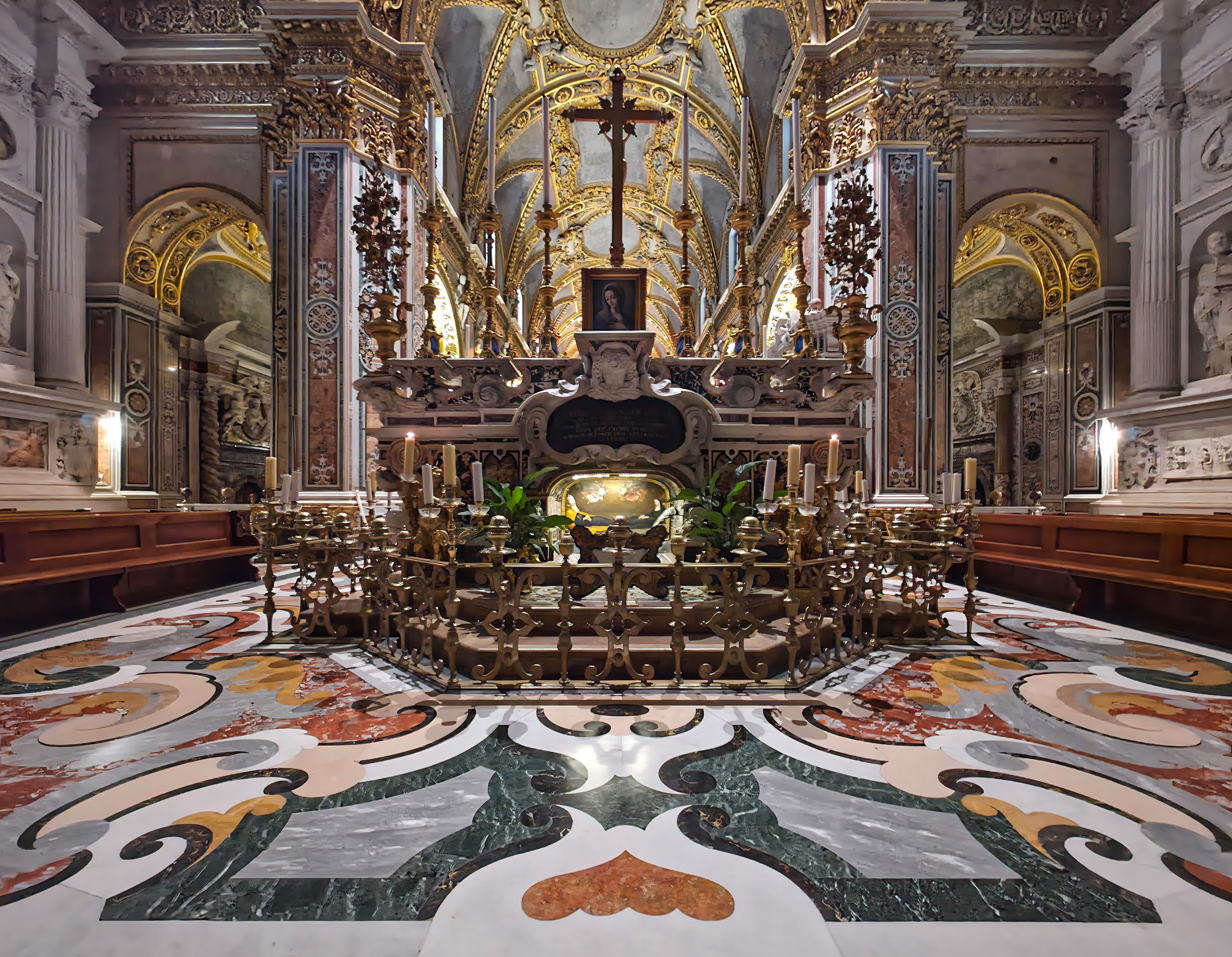
High Altar

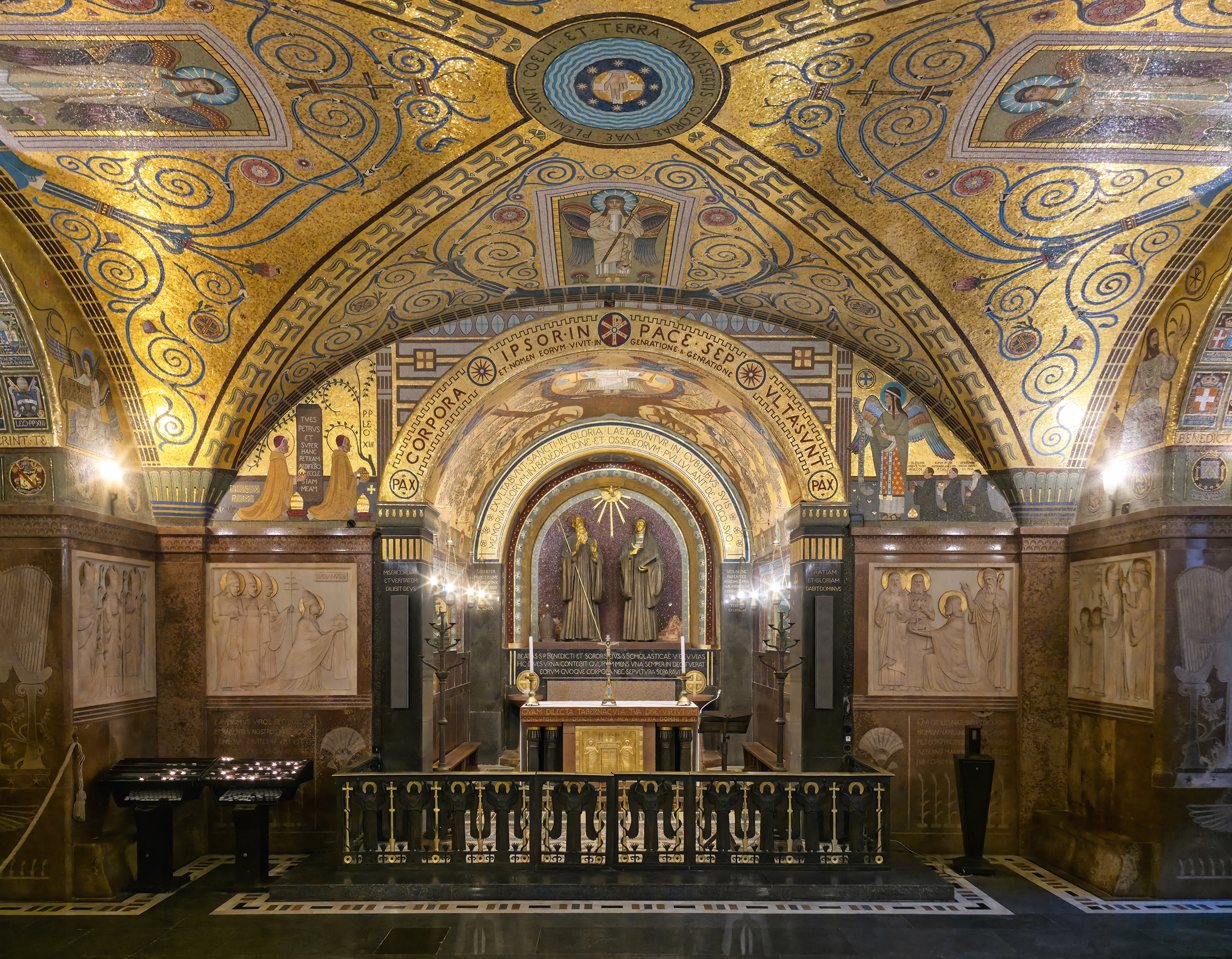
Cathedral Crypt

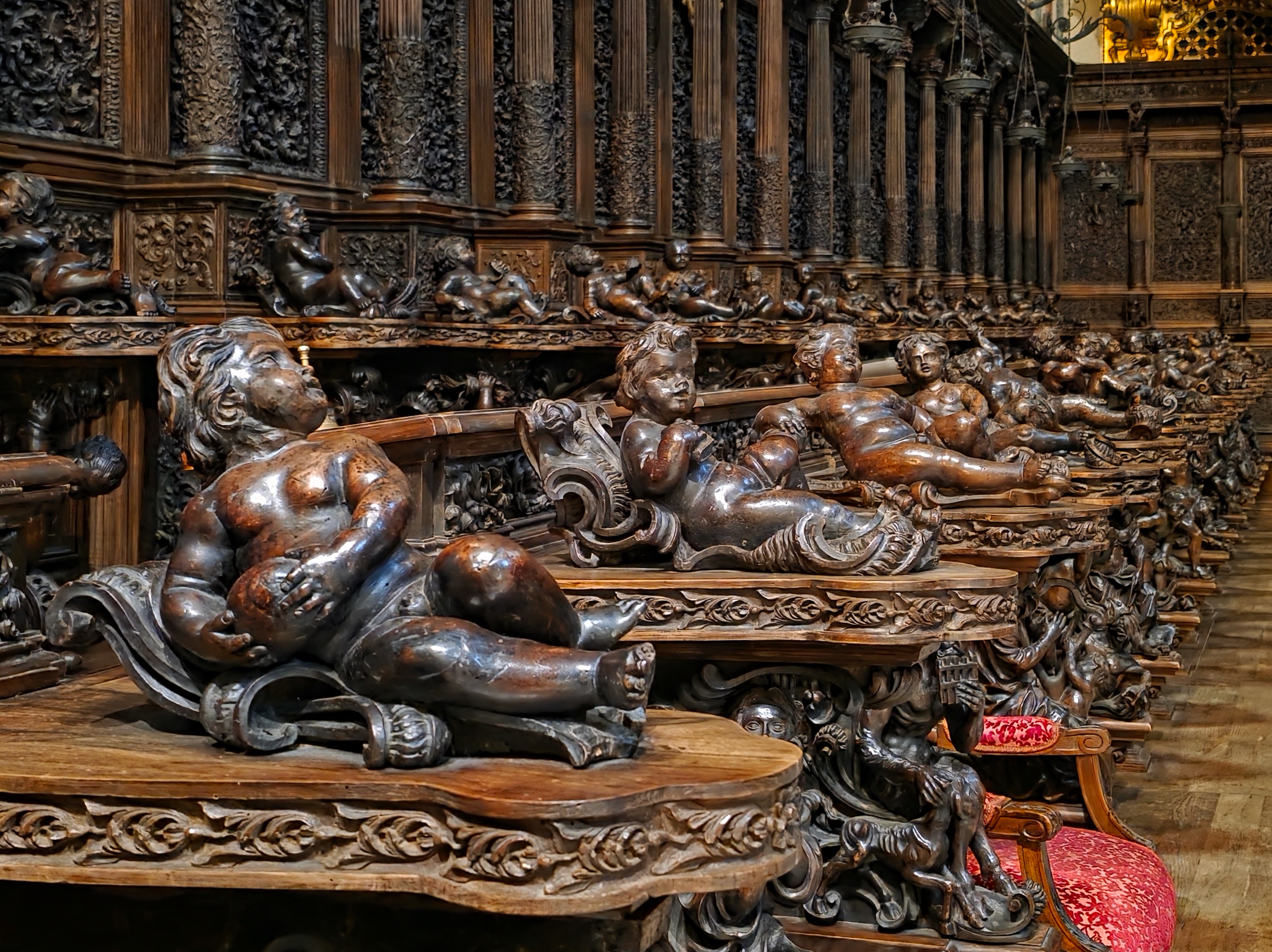
Choir Stalls

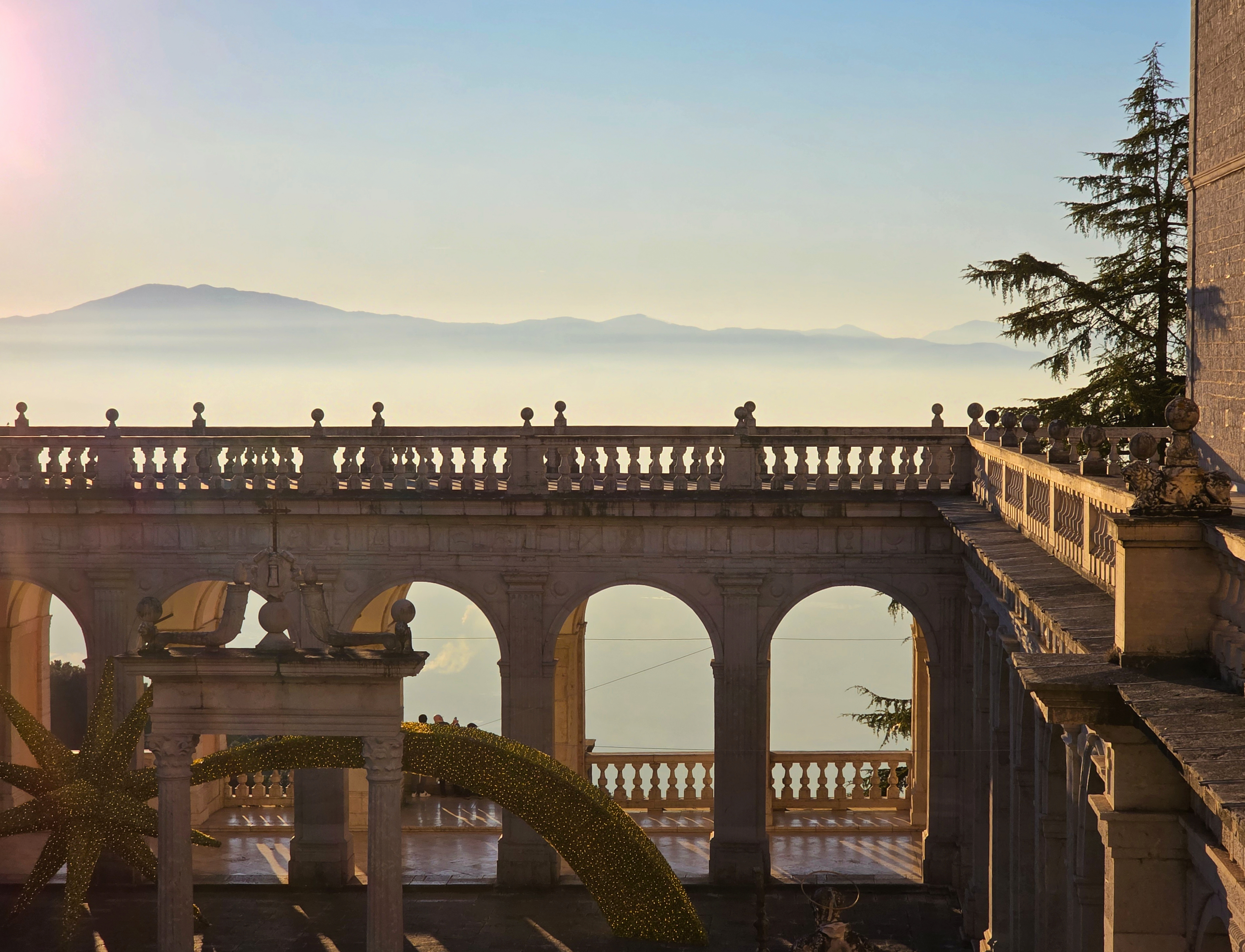
View from Cathedral

== Treasures ==
In December 1943, some 1,400 irreplaceable manuscript codices, chiefly patristic and historical, in addition to a vast number of documents relating to the history of the abbey and the collections of the Keats–Shelley Memorial House in Rome, had been sent to the abbey archives for safekeeping. German officers Lt. Col. Julius Schlegel (a Roman Catholic) and Capt. Maximilian Becker (a Protestant), both from the Panzer-Division Hermann Göring, had them transferred to the Vatican at the beginning of the battle.

Another account, however, from revisionist author Franz Kurowski's The History of the Fallschirmpanzerkorps Hermann Göring: Soldiers of the Reichsmarschall, notes that 120 trucks were loaded with monastic assets and art which had been stored there for safekeeping. Robert Edsel (2006), on the other hand, speculates it might have been looting. The trucks were loaded and left in October 1943, and only "strenuous" protests resulted in their delivery to the Vatican, minus the 15 cases which contained the property of the Capodimonte Museum in Naples. Edsel goes on to note that these cases had been delivered to Göring in December 1943, for "his birthday". This is, however, unproven.

== People ==
=== Burials ===
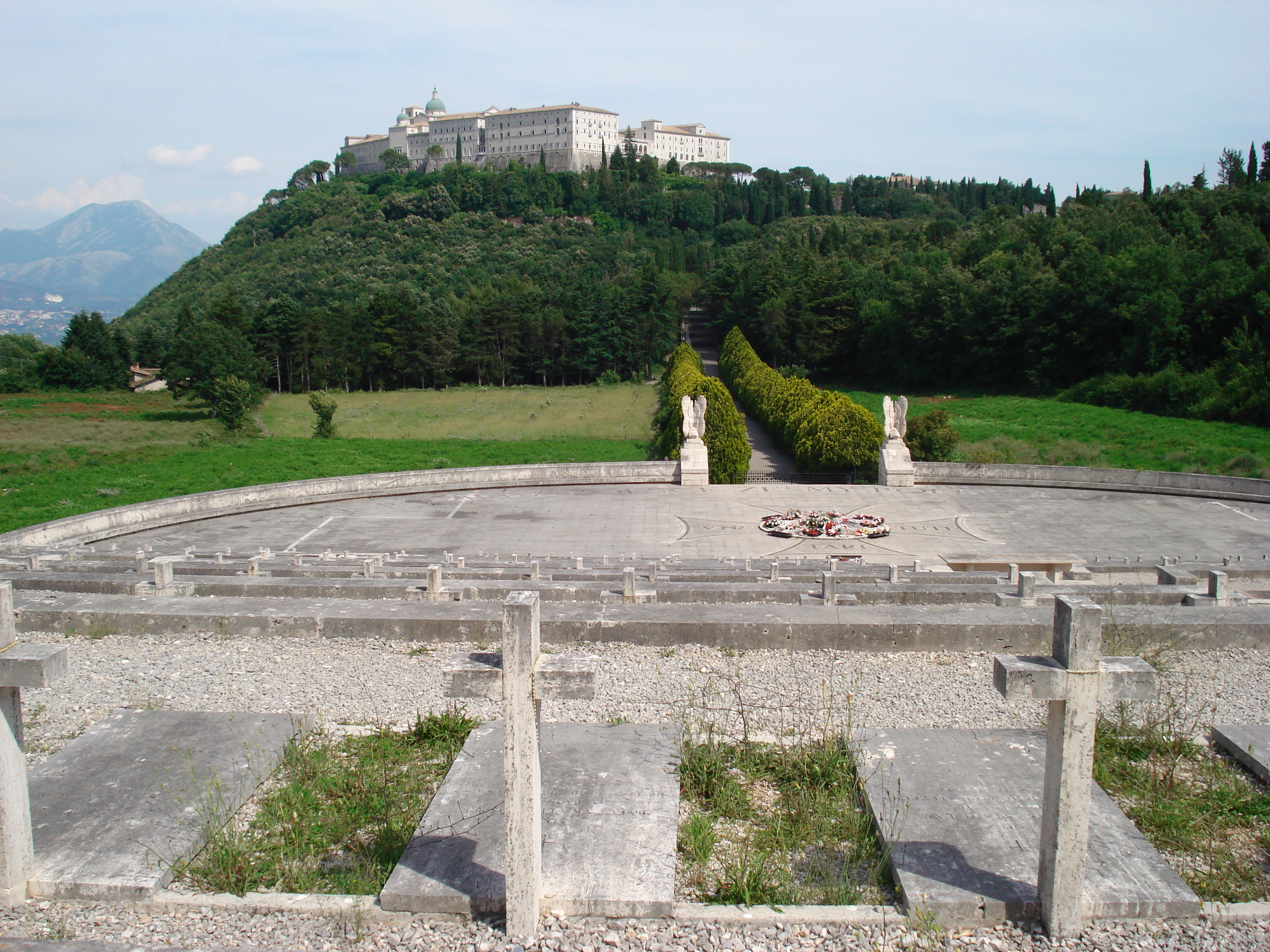
Panorama from Polish cemetery

- Pope Victor III
- Cardinal Domenico Bartolini (1813–87)
- Saint Apollinaris, abbot of Montecassino, feast day on 27 November
- Saint Benedict
- Saint Bertharius, abbot of Montecassino
- Józef Gawlina, archbishop and Divisional general
- John Gradenigo
- Saint Scholastica
- Sigelgaita of Salerno
- Carloman (mayor of the palace)
- Władysław Anders
- Members of the Polish 2nd Army Corps
- Piero the Unfortunate

== See also ==
- 17th-century Western domes
- Battle of Monte Cassino
- Cassino War Cemetery
- Lamp of Brotherhood, lamps that were distributed at Monte Cassino to promote reconciliation after World War II
- Polish cemetery at Monte Cassino
- Red Poppies on Monte Cassino
- San Giovanni in Venere
- San Liberatore a Maiella
- The Cassino Band of Northumbria Army Cadet Force
- The Red Poppies on Monte Cassino

== Sources ==
- Atkinson, Rick (2007). The Day of Battle: the War in Sicily and Italy, 1943–1944. New York: Henry Holt. ISBN 978-0-8050-6289-2.
- Bloch, Herbert (1986). Monte Cassino in the Middle Ages. Vol. 1. Roma: Edizioni di Storia e Letteratura.
- Christie, Neil (2006), From Constantine to Charlemagne: An Archaeology of Italy AD 300–800, Ashgate Publishing, ISBN 1-85928-421-3
- Catholic Encyclopedia, 1908.
- Hapgood, David; Richardson, David (2002) [1984]. Monte Cassino: The Story of the Most Controversial Battle of World War II (reprint ed.). Cambridge Mass.: Da Capo. ISBN 0-306-81121-9.
- Michela Cigola, L'abbazia benedettina di Montecassino. La storia attraverso le testimonianze grafiche di rilievo e di progetto. Cassino, Ciolfi Editore, 2005. ISBN 88-86810-28-8
