= Sabinia gens =

Ancient Roman family

The gens Sabinia, occasionally written Sabineia, was a minor plebeian family at ancient Rome. Only a few members of this gens are mentioned in history, but others are known from inscriptions. Titus Sabinius Barbarus attained the consulship in the reign of Hadrian.

== Origin ==
The nomen Sabinius belongs to a large class of gentilicia formed from surnames ending in -inus. Sabinus was a common surname, originally designating someone of Sabine descent.

== Members ==
This list includes abbreviated praenomina. For an explanation of this practice, see filiation.

- Sabineius, an orator whose style Martial describes as boring.
- Titus Sabinius Barbarus, legate of the Legio III Augusta under Trajan, was appointed consul suffectus in AD 118, early in the reign of Hadrian.
- Titus Sabinius Mercurialis, a freedman buried at Rome, in a tomb built by Titus Sabinius Pinna.
- Sabinia Olympias, a freedwoman buried at Rome, in a tomb built by Titus Sabinius Pinna.
- Titus Sabinius Pinna, a freedman, perhaps of the consul Titus Sabinius Barbarus, who built a tomb at Rome for himself and his conliberti, Titus Sabinius Mercurialis, and Sabinia Olympias.
- Quintus Sabinius Veranus, a tax collector in Noricum, probably during the reign of Antoninus Pius. His wife may have been Sabinia Sabinilla. He is probably the same Quintus Sabinius Veranus named as duumvir in Moesia Inferior in AD 159 or 160.
- Sabinia Sabinilla, probably the wife of Quintus Sabinius Veranus.
- Sabinius Xanthippus, a freedman of Quintus Sabinius Veranus and Sabinia Sabinilla, buried at Rome between AD 130 and 170.
- Sabinia Celsina, a woman of a senatorial family, was the daughter of Naevia Marciana, and wife of Geminius Modestus, a man of praetorian rank at Cirta in Numidia.
- Sabinius Dignus, the master of Optatus, a slave buried at Rome, aged forty.
- Sabinia Digna, the mistress of Saecularis, a slave buried at the present site of Pyrat in Austria, formerly part of Noricum.
- Sabinius Modestus, governor of Moesia Inferior from about AD 241 to 242 or 243.
- Sabinia Felicitas, the wife of Lucius Percennius Lascivus, a third century eques buried at Rome.

== See also ==
- List of Roman gentes

== Bibliography ==
- Marcus Valerius Martialis (Martial), Epigrammata (Epigrams).
- Theodor Mommsen et alii, Corpus Inscriptionum Latinarum (The Body of Latin Inscriptions, abbreviated CIL), Berlin-Brandenburgische Akademie der Wissenschaften (1853–present).
- René Cagnat et alii, L'Année épigraphique (The Year in Epigraphy, abbreviated AE), Presses Universitaires de France (1888–present).
- August Pauly, Georg Wissowa, et alii, Realencyclopädie der Classischen Altertumswissenschaft (Scientific Encyclopedia of the Knowledge of Classical Antiquities, abbreviated RE or PW), J. B. Metzler, Stuttgart (1894–1980).
- Annona Epigraphica Austriaca (Epigraphy of Austria Annual, abbreviated AEA) (1979–present).
- Silvio Panciera, La collezione epigrafica dei musei Capitolini (The Epigraphic Collection of the Capitoline Museum), Quasar Edizioni, Rome (1987).
- Alison E. Cooley, The Cambridge Manual of Latin Epigraphy, Cambridge University Press (2012).
