= The Red Poppies on Monte Cassino =

Polish military song of WWII

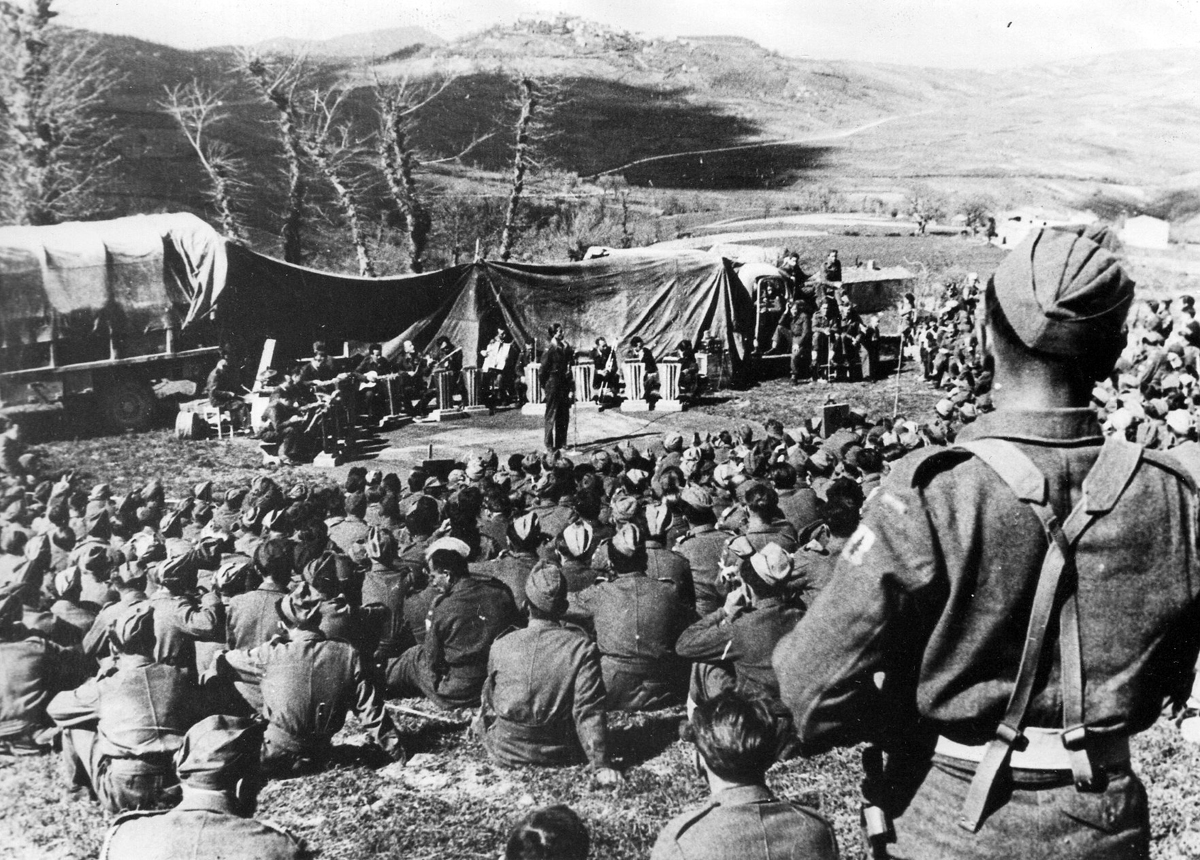
Men of the Third Carpathian Rifle Division hear The Red Poppies performed by Alfred Schütz's orchestra, May 1944.

Czerwone maki na Monte Cassino (The Red Poppies on Monte Cassino) is one of the best-known Polish military songs of World War II. It was composed in May 1944 in Italy, during the Battle of Monte Cassino, on the eve of the Polish Army's capture of the German stronghold.

== History ==
In early 1944 a German stronghold, dug in at the ancient Benedictine monastery atop Monte Cassino, had blocked the Allies' advance toward Rome. The forces of several Allied countries had attempted since mid-January to capture the German fortress. For a fourth major assault, which began on 11 May 1944, Polish troops were rotated in.

The song's melody was composed during the night of 17–18 May 1944 by Alfred Schütz, a composer, actor and member of the Polish Soldiers' Theater garrisoned at Campobasso in the shadow of Monte Cassino. Two opening stanzas were written at that time by Feliks Konarski ("Ref-ren" — "Refrain"), a poet and songwriter and soldier of the Polish II Corps commanded by Major General Władysław Anders. The third stanza was written a few days later.

The third verse, Konarski wrote several hours later. In his memoirs, he wrote:

"For the first time singing Red poppies on Monte Cassino, we all cried. Soldiers cried with us. Red poppies, which bloomed over night, became one more symbol of bravery and sacrifice - a tribute of alive ones, whom for love of freedom died for freedom of people."

The fourth and final stanza was written a quarter-century later, in 1969, to commemorate the 25th anniversary of the battle. That final stanza is the least known and is sometimes omitted.

On 18 May 1944, the day following the song's composition, the Poles stormed and captured the precincts of the Monte Cassino monastery. Later that day, the song was first performed at General Anders' headquarters to celebrate the Polish victory. The Red Poppies on Monte Cassino won popularity with the troops and was soon published by a Polish-American newspaper in New York. It was later published in Poland. It was banned, however, during the Stalinist period in the People's Republic of Poland, when the government sought to minimize memory of the wartime Polish Armed Forces in the West. It is featured, however, in Andrzej Wajda's film Ashes and Diamonds, made in 1958, after the death of Stalin.

== Copyright ==
Schütz moved to Munich in 1961 and died there in 1999. After the death of his wife, as they had no heir, under German law the state of Bavaria acquired copyright, and royalties for commercial use of the "Red Poppies" melody were paid to it through GEMA, the German organization of collective management of copyright. In 2014 the Polish Song Library together with Polish lawyer Bogusław Wieczorek took action to retrieve the copyright and received a formal reply from Bavarian authorities of willingness to pass the copyright to the Polish state. In 2015 a further attempt was made by the Polish Consulate General in Munich and on 15 September 2015 Bavaria renounced all rights to the song and melody, which were transferred to Poland.

== See also ==
- Monte Cassino Commemorative Cross
- Polish Military Cemetery at Monte Cassino
- Polish Military Cemetery at Casamassima
- "In Flanders Fields"
- Papaver rhoeas
- Remembrance poppy
