= Gaius Ummidius Durmius Quadratus =

Roman senator

Gaius Ummidius Durmius Quadratus (c. 12 BC – c. 60 AD) was a Roman senator of the Principate. He was the first member of the Ummidii to reach the office of consul in his family, or a homo novus. Quadratus is also known for his tenure as governor of Syria from c. 50 AD until his death.

== Biography ==
=== Family ===
Gaius Ummidius Durmius Quadratus was born c. 12 BC. His family, the Ummidii, were wealthy aristocrats from the town of Casinum, Latium. His second family name, "Durmius", has been explained in one of two ways: either his mother was a Durmia, or he was a Durmius adopted into the Ummidii. If the latter, this would mean one Marcus Durmius was his father, known to have been a mint official c. 19 BC; it is commonly agreed that there is some relationship between Quadratus and the mint official.

Although it is accepted that Quadratus had at least one child—the wealthy Ummidia Quadratilla, memorialized in one of Pliny the Younger's letters–not only is the name of his wife unknown, but also whether Quadratus had married more than once.

=== Career under Tiberius ===
The cursus honorum – the sequence of positions held by Roman senators – of Quadratus is known from two inscriptions, one erected while he was governor of Lusitania, the other much later while governor of Syria. It is possible his relative Marcus Durmius helped Quadratus at the beginning of his senatorial career by facilitating his entrance into the decemviri stlitibus iudicandis, one of the four boards that comprised the vigintiviri, a minor magistracy that was a required first step to enter the Senate. Mireille Corbier dates this achievement to 14 AD. Upon promotion as a quaestor, he became a member of the Senate; moreover, he achieved a distinction rarely granted to a homo novus: being one of the two imperial quaestores.

For the following years Quadratus advanced rapidly through the traditional republican magistracies, becoming curule aedile around 16 AD and praetor in 18 AD. Immediately after that office, he became prefect of the aerarium Saturni, or overseer of the treasury of Saturn, then held a special office Tiberius had created: curator tabularum publicarum, or keeper of the public archives; Corbier assigns the dates he held these offices to 18 and 19 AD respectively. Quadratus could have expected to acceded to the consulship in due course, but his only known office for many years after conclusion of his tenure as curator was proconsular governor of Cyprus, a modest public province. Ronald Syme speculates that he had somehow fallen from the Emperor's favour. Quadratus is next attested as governor of the imperial province of Lusitania in 37 AD, administering the oath of allegiance to the new emperor on Tiberius's death. The dates when he started and ended his governorship are uncertain. The previous governor, Fulcinius Trio, returned to Rome before 1 July 31 when he began his tenure as suffect consul; normally governors served for three years at a time, and another man may have been in office between him and Quadratus, but at this point in his reign Tiberius often prolonged the time senators were assigned to imperial provinces; it is possible Quadratus was dispatched to distant Lusitania as early as 31 AD, and remained there through the reign of Caligula.

By the reign of Claudius, Quadratus was definitely back in Rome, for the Syrian inscription attests he was suffect consul at this time. Syme writes he held the fasces "perhaps in 38 or 39. For discretion, let his consulship be registered as 'c. 40'." Soon after leaving his office, Quadratus was admitted to the Quindecimviri sacris faciundis, the priesthood entrusted with care of the Sibylline Books and one of the four most prestigious Roman priesthoods. He did not remain in Rome long, for he is attested appointed by Claudius as governor in "Illyria"—either the province of Dalmatia or Pannonia. His governorship of Syria followed.

=== Governorship of Syria ===
The procurator of Iudaea, Ventidius Cumanus, was accused of partiality to the Samaritans, who were at variance with the Galileans, and both parties appealed to Quadratus. The governor went to Samaria in 52 AD and suppressed the disturbance. The Samaritan and Galilean insurgents were crucified; five (eighteen according to Josephus) Galileans whom the Samaritans pointed out as instigators of the movement were executed in Lydda; High priest Ananias and Anan, the governor of the temple, were sent in chains to Rome; and the leaders of the Samaritans, the procurator Cumanus, and the military tribune Celer were also sent to plead their cause before the emperor. In fear of further disturbances, Quadratus hurried to Jerusalem; finding the city peacefully celebrating the Feast of Passover, he returned to Antioch. Cumanus was deposed and was succeeded by Felix, appointed at the request of the high priest, Jonathan, whom Quadratus also had sent to Rome.

Tacitus's version of the story can not be reconciled with that of Josephus, since, according to the former, Felix and Cumanus were procurators at the same time, the one in Samaria and the other in Galilee. Also according to Tacitus, Quadratus himself sat in judgment upon Cumanus, and he expressly states that Quadratus was superior to the procurator in authority. Quadratus died during his tenure of office. Several coins struck by him have been found.
