= Marcus Ummidius Quadratus Annianus =

Roman senator and consul (138–182)

Marcus Ummidius Quadratus Annianus (138–182) was a Roman senator and the nephew of the Emperor Marcus Aurelius. He was involved in an unsuccessful plot to assassinate his cousin the Emperor Commodus, which led to his execution afterwards.

Offices Quadratus Annianus held included legate to the proconsul of Africa, and consul ordinarius in 167 with the emperor Lucius Aurelius Verus.

== Life ==
Quadratus Annianus was the son of Marcus Aurelius’ sister, Annia Cornificia Faustina and an unnamed Senator. Ronald Syme identifies the unnamed senator as one of the suffect consuls in 146, recorded in the Fasti Ostienses as Gaius Annianus Verus, but having the full name of Gaius Ummidius Quadratus Annianus Verus. He was descended from one of the leading aristocratic and political influential families in Rome and was a direct descendant of the late suffect consul Gaius Ummidius Durmius Quadratus. Through his mother, Quadratus Annianus was related to the ruling Nerva–Antonine dynasty. His sister was Ummidia Cornificia Faustina.

His mother had died sometime between 152 and 158. At her death, M. Ummidius Quadratus Annianus and Ummidia Cornificia Faustina divided their mother's property, making them both very wealthy. After his mother's death, Quadratus took a mistress, a Greek freedwoman named Marcia, who would later become the emperor Commodus' mistress.

Following his consulship, Quadratus adopted the first son of the Senator and philosopher Gnaeus Claudius Severus, who then assumed the name Marcus Claudius Ummidius Quadratus. The reason for the adoption is unknown.

When Marcus Aurelius died in 180, Quadratus' maternal cousin Commodus succeeded him as emperor. Commodus’ sister Lucilla was not happy living as a quiet, private citizen in Rome and became jealous of her brother and her sister-in-law. Further, she became very concerned at Commodus' erratic behavior.

In 182, Lucilla, her daughter Plautia, and her nephew-in-marriage Quintianus, along with Quadratus, his adopted son, and Cornificia Faustina, planned to assassinate Commodus and replace him with Lucilla and her second husband, the consul Tiberius Claudius Pompeianus Quintianus. The involvement of Quadratus, his adopted son (M. Claudius Ummidius Quadratus) and his sister (Ummidia Cornificia Faustina) can be explained by a possible dynastic dispute with Commodus, or a possible romantic relationship between Quadratus and Lucilla.

Quintianus botched his attempt to kill Commodus and was arrested. The conspirators were soon revealed, and the emperor ordered the deaths of M. Ummidius Quadratus Annianus, M. Claudius Ummidius Quadratus (his adopted son) and Ti. Claudius Pompeianus Quintianus. Commodus may have confiscated Quadratus Annianus’ property and fortune. Lucilla, her daughter, and Ummidia Cornificia Faustina were banished to the Italian island of Capri, and later executed.

== See also ==
- Ummidia gens

== Sources ==
- Krawczuk, Aleksander. Poczet cesarzowych Rzymu. Warszawa: Iskry. ISBN 83-244-0021-4.
- Anthony Richard Birley, Septimius Severus: the African emperor, 2nd ed., 1999
- Anthony Richard Birley, Marcus Aurelius, Routledge, 2000
- Albino Garzetti, From Tiberius to the Antonines: a history of the Roman Empire AD 14–192, 1974
- William M. Ramsay, The Cities and Bishoprics of Phyrgia: Being an Essay of the Local History of Phrygia from the Earliest Times to the Turkish Conquest, Volume One, Part One
- Roman Emperors
- "Lucius Aurelius Commodus (AD 161 – AD 192)".
- "The People's Princeps, Enemy of the Senate". UNRV.com.

Political offices
Preceded by Publius Martius Verus, and Marcus Vibius Liberalis as suffect consuls	Consul of the Roman Empire; 167 with Lucius Verus III	Succeeded by Quintus Caecilius Dentilianus, and Marcus Antonius Pallas as suffect consuls
