= Ummidia Quadratilla =

1st century AD Roman woman

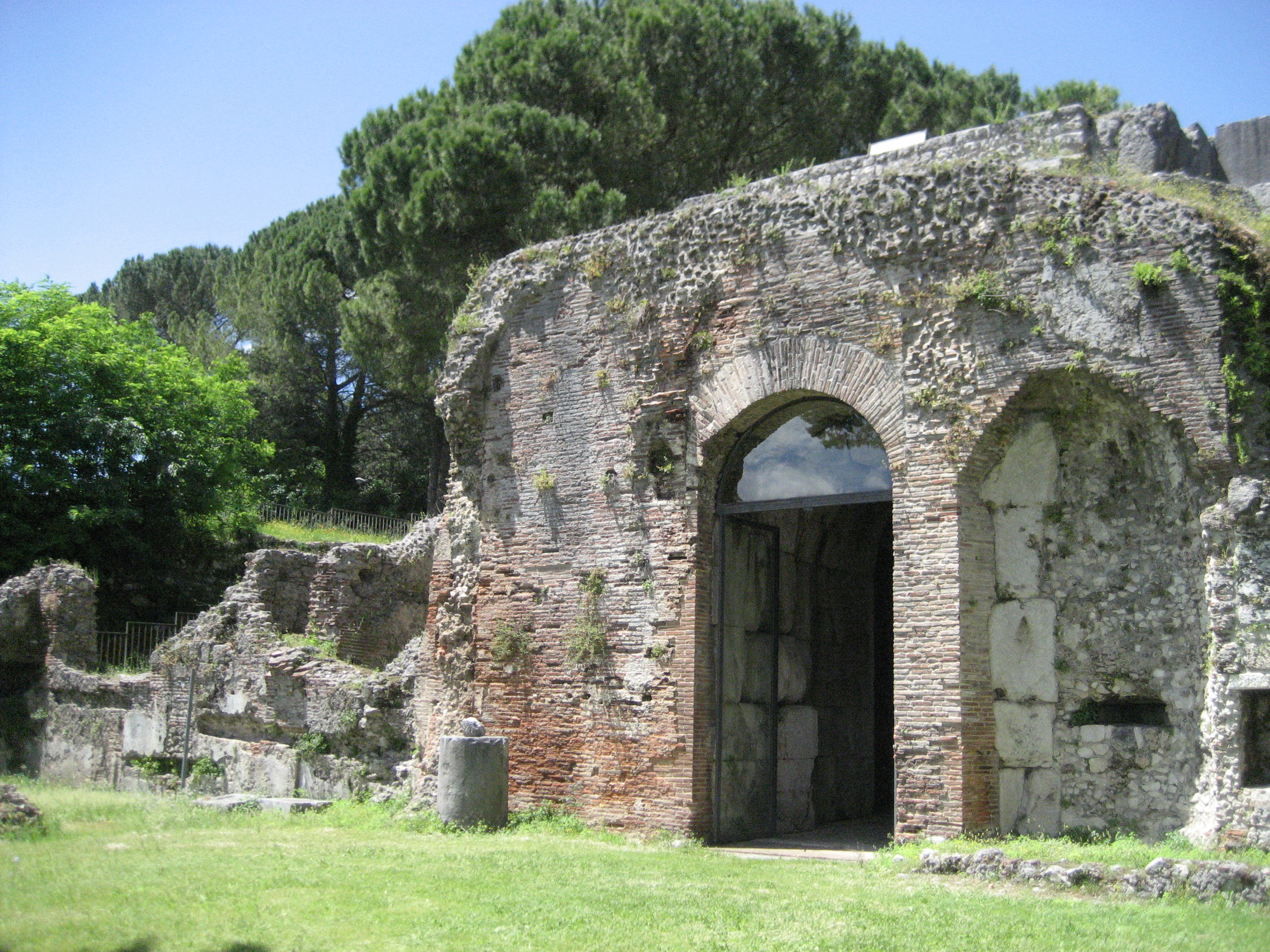
Mausoleum of Ummidia Quadratilla in Casinum (Cassino)

Ummidia Quadratilla was a wealthy Roman woman and was a member of the gens Ummidia. She died in the reign of Emperor Trajan (98-117), around 107 CE, within a little of eighty years of age, leaving two-thirds (ex besse) of her fortune to her grandson and the other third to her granddaughter. Her grandson Ummidius Quadratus was an intimate friend of Roman Senator and historian Pliny the Younger, who praises her for fostering Quadratus' studies while keeping him untouched by her luxurious lifestyle - , Ummidia Quadratilla kept slaves at home to perform pantomimes for her.

Pliny also mentioned she kept Quadratus untouched by her extravagant lifestyle "not only out of love, but also out of respect". She did this as in her youth this luxurious lifestyle was common for her and similar families. However, under the new Roman empire, society had become stricter and it was best for Quadratus to not indulge in these luxuries if he is to pursue his career.

Quadratilla was probably a daughter of Gaius Ummidius Durmius Quadratus, the governor of Syria, who died in 60 AD. She is mentioned in two inscriptions discovered in Casinum (Cassino) in Lazio, the hometown of her family:

- "Ummidia C(ai) f(ilia) / Quadratilla / amphitheatrum et / templum Casinatibus / sua pecunia fecit" (CIL X, 5183).
- "[Ummidia C(ai) f(ilia) Qu]adrati[lla theatr]um / [impensis? patri]s sui [exornatum? vetus]tate / [collapsum Casinatibus su]a pec(unia) [res]titu[it et ob dedica]tionem / [decurionibus et popu]lo et [m]ulier[ibus epulum] dedit" (AE 1946, 174/AE 1992, 244)

== Bibliography ==
- Mauriz Schuster: Ummidius 3 (in German). In: Realencyclopädie der classischen Altertumswissenschaft (RE). Vol. IX A,1, Stuttgart, 1961, col. 600–603.
