= Casinum =

Ancient town in southern Italy

Coordinates: 41°29′24″N 13°48′50″E

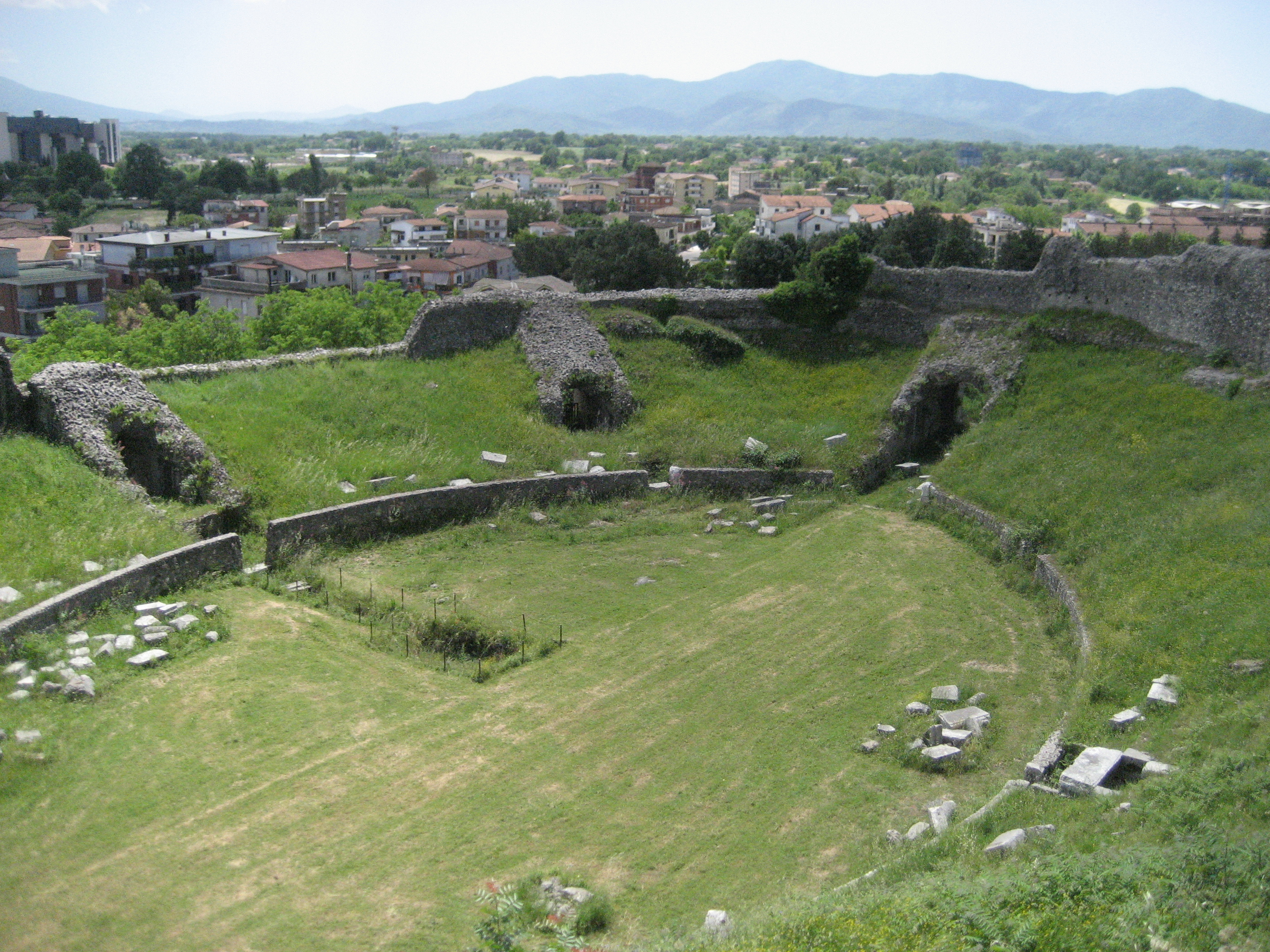
Casinum Amphitheatre

Casinum was an ancient town of Italy, of Oscan origin. The most southeasterly town in Latium adiectum, it was situated on the Via Latina about 40 miles north-west of Capua. Varro states that the name meant "old forum" (Latin forum vetus) in the Oscan language, and also that the town itself was Samnite before the Roman conquest.

== History ==
Casinum was a Samnite city only before the Roman conquest and it is difficult to reconstruct the history in the intermediate period, between Oscans and Samnites, when it had been occupied by the Volsci. It appears occasionally in the history of the Hannibalic War, but it is not known when the city came under Roman supremacy. It probably received the Roman citizenship in 188 BC. Varro possessed a villa nearby, in which later on Mark Antony held his orgies.

Towards the end of the republic it was a praefectura, and under the empire it appears as a colony (perhaps founded by the triumvirs), though in two (not local) inscriptions it is called municipium. Strabo speaks of it as a relevant center, the last city of the Latins; Varro mentions the olive oil of its district as especially good. The older Volscian town must have stood on the summit (1,715 ft) above the Roman town (148 ft), where considerable remains of an acropolis with walls in Cyclopean masonry, finely cut blocks of limestone, still exist.

The summit is now occupied by the Benedictine monastery of Monte Cassino founded by St. Benedict himself in 529. A number of Roman inscriptions from Casinum are preserved there. The wall which runs southwest and west starting from the west side of the monastery for about 300 m is not so clearly traceable on the other side of the hill, though there is one fragment under the east side of the monastery.

The medieval town of San Germano, which resumed the name Cassino in 1871, lies a little to the north. The cathedral was founded in the 8th century, but the present building was constructed in the 17th century. The church of S. Maria delle Cinque Torri contains twelve ancient marble columns; above the town is a picturesque medieval castle.

== Remains ==
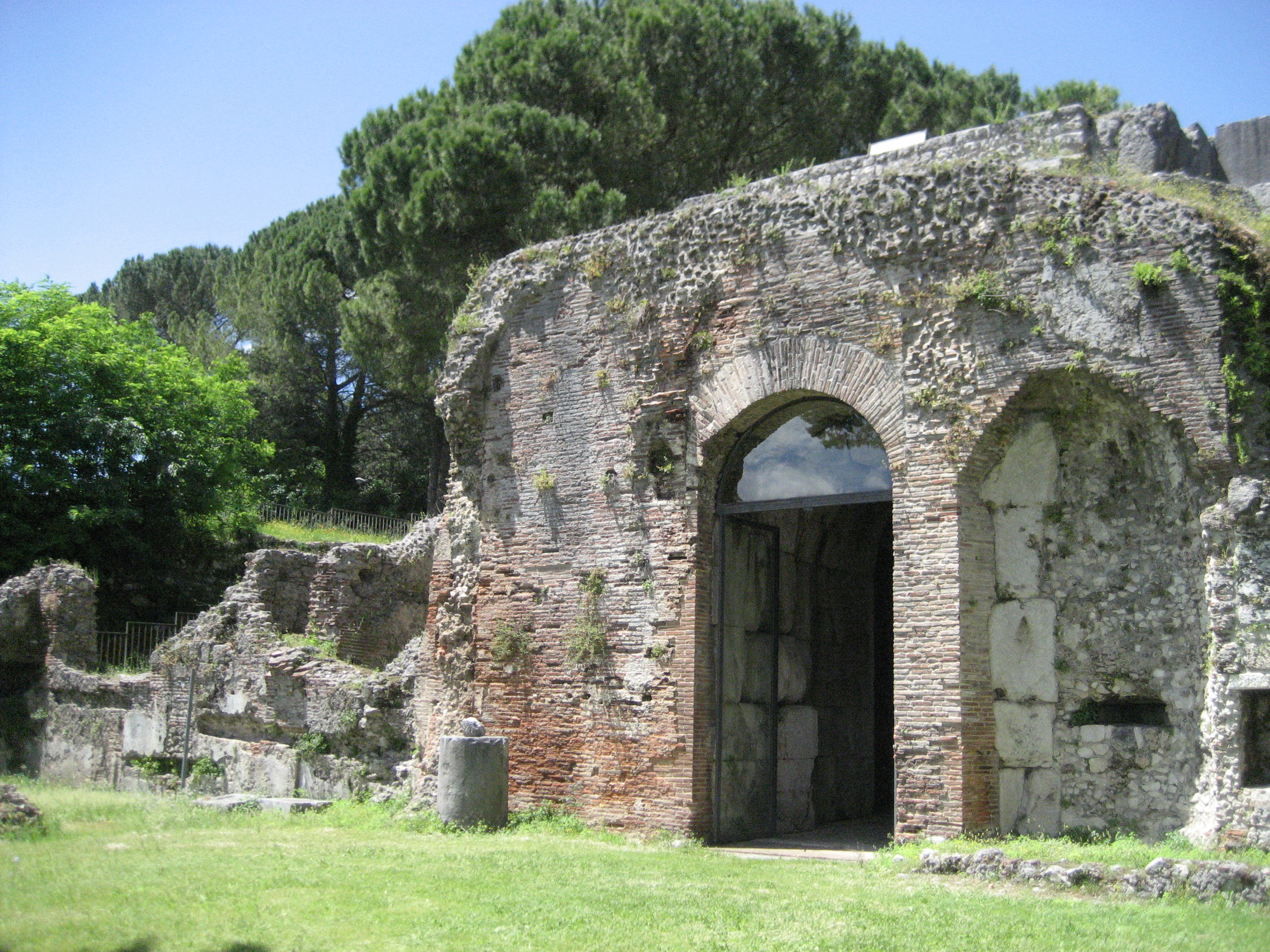
Mausoleum of Ummidia Quadratilla

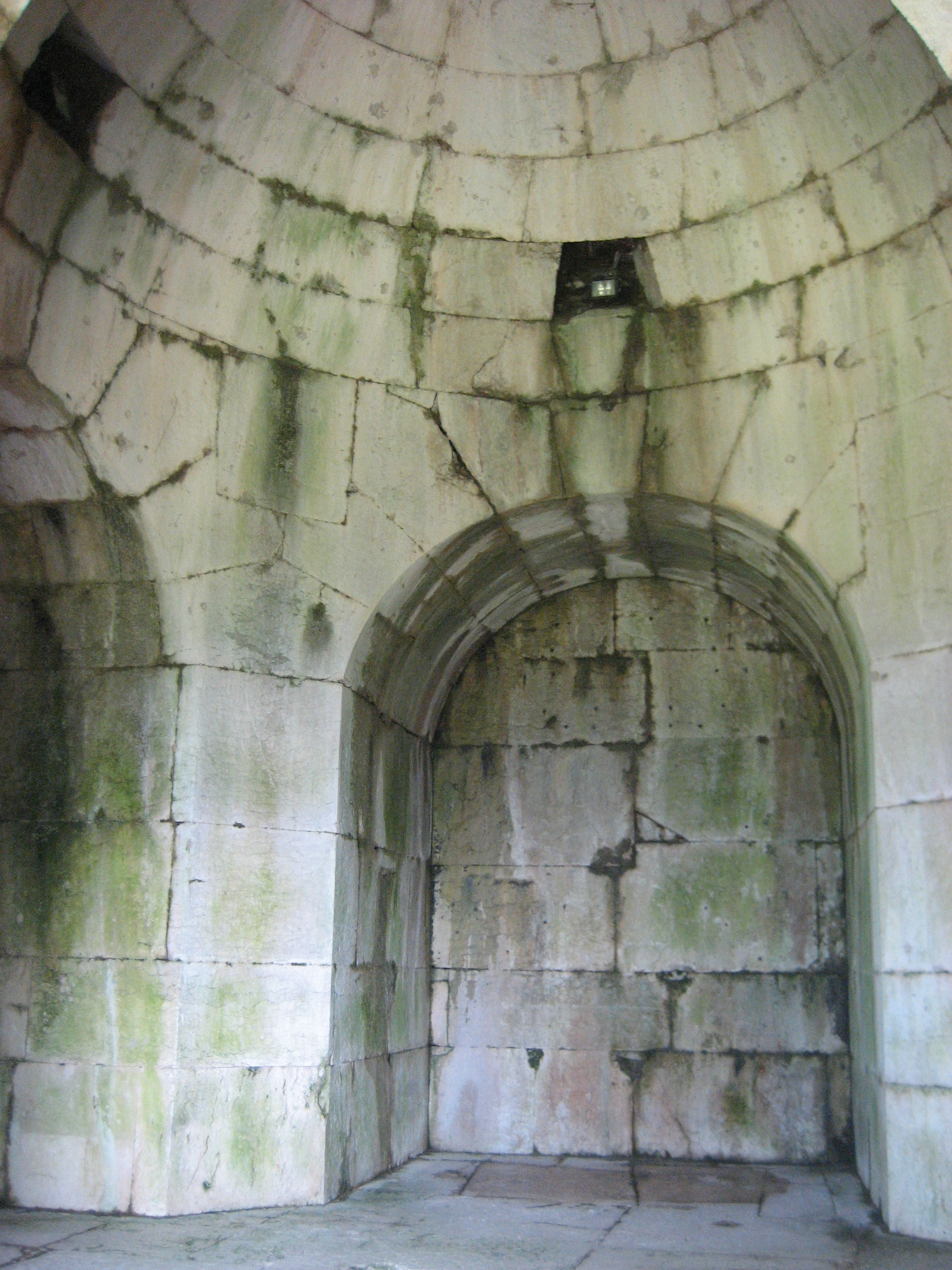
Mausoleum of Ummidia Quadratilla interior

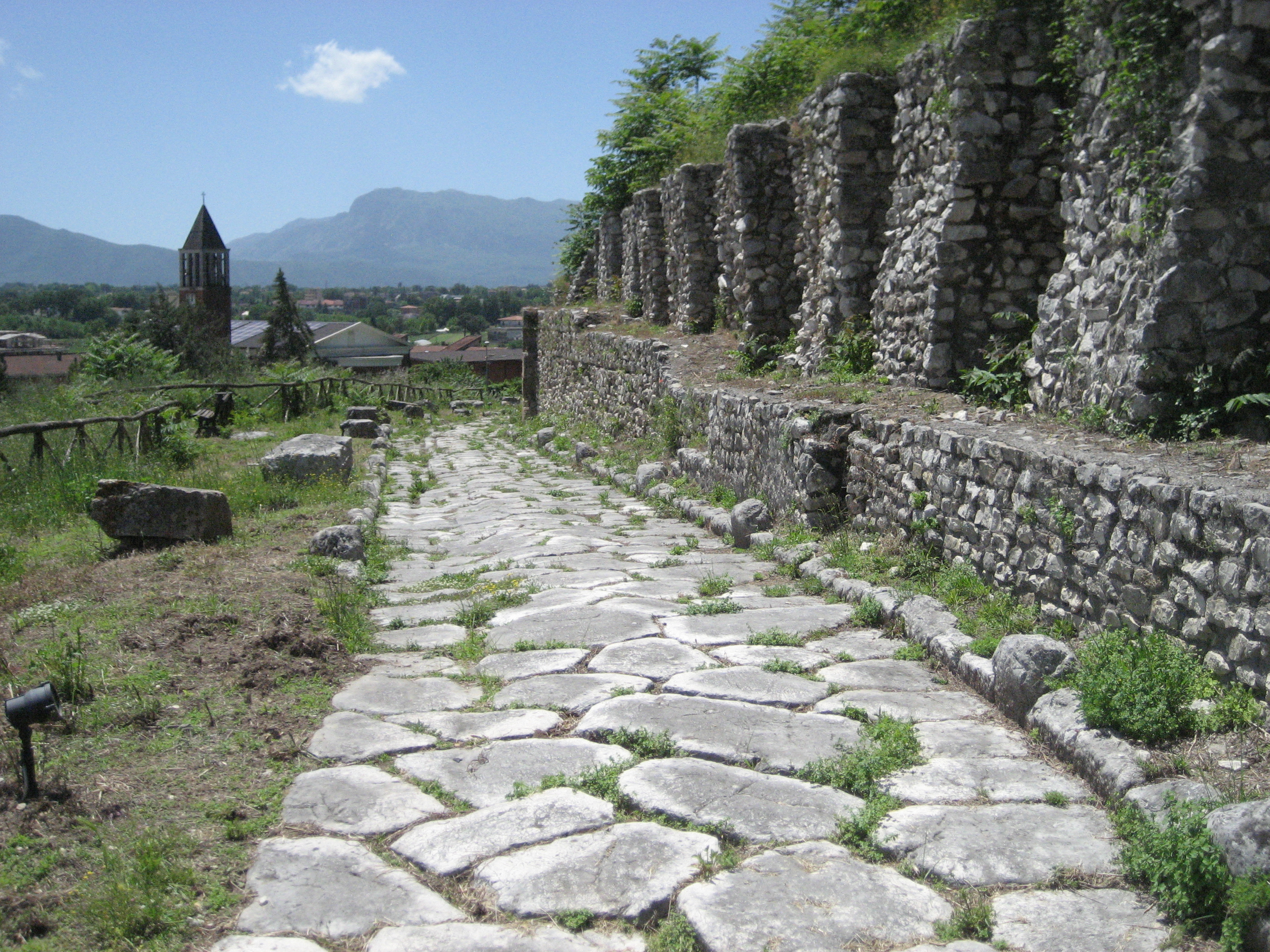
Via Latina through Casinum

The Roman town lay at the foot of the mountain, close to the Via Latina. The amphitheatre, erected by Ummidia Quadratilla (whose passion for actors is mentioned by Pliny, Epist. vii.24, on the occasion of her death at the age of about eighty), still exists: it is built of opus reticulatum and the five entrances are by arches of larger blocks of stone; it is approximately circular in plan. The external walls are 59 feet high. The seats in the interior have disappeared.

Above it on the hillside is a theatre of opus reticulatum, less well preserved. Close by is a building converted into the Cappella del Crocefisso, originally perhaps a tomb in the Via Latina; it is a chamber in the form of a Greek cross, constructed of large masses of travertine, with a domed roof of the same material. On the opposite bank of the Rapido are the ruins called Monticelli, attributed to the villa of Varro, a part of which was frequently drawn by the architects of the 16th century.
