= Garden of Ninfa =

Italian natural monument

Coordinates: 41°34′56″N 12°57′19″E

The castle and a river.

The Garden of Ninfa is a garden in the territory of Cisterna di Latina, in the province of Latina, central Italy. The park has an area of 105 hectares (260 acres), and is an Italian natural monument. The landscape garden within the park comprises 8 hectares (20 acres) and contains medieval ruins, several oaks, cypresses and poplars, grassy meadows, a wide range of exotic plants from various parts of the world, numerous watercourses and a large variety of rambling roses growing over the stone walls of the ruins. The site is run by the Italian foundation Fondazione Roffredo Caetani. It is open to the public at set times from April to November. Nearby towns include Norma and Sermoneta. Ninfa has been described as "the most romantic garden in the world".

== History ==
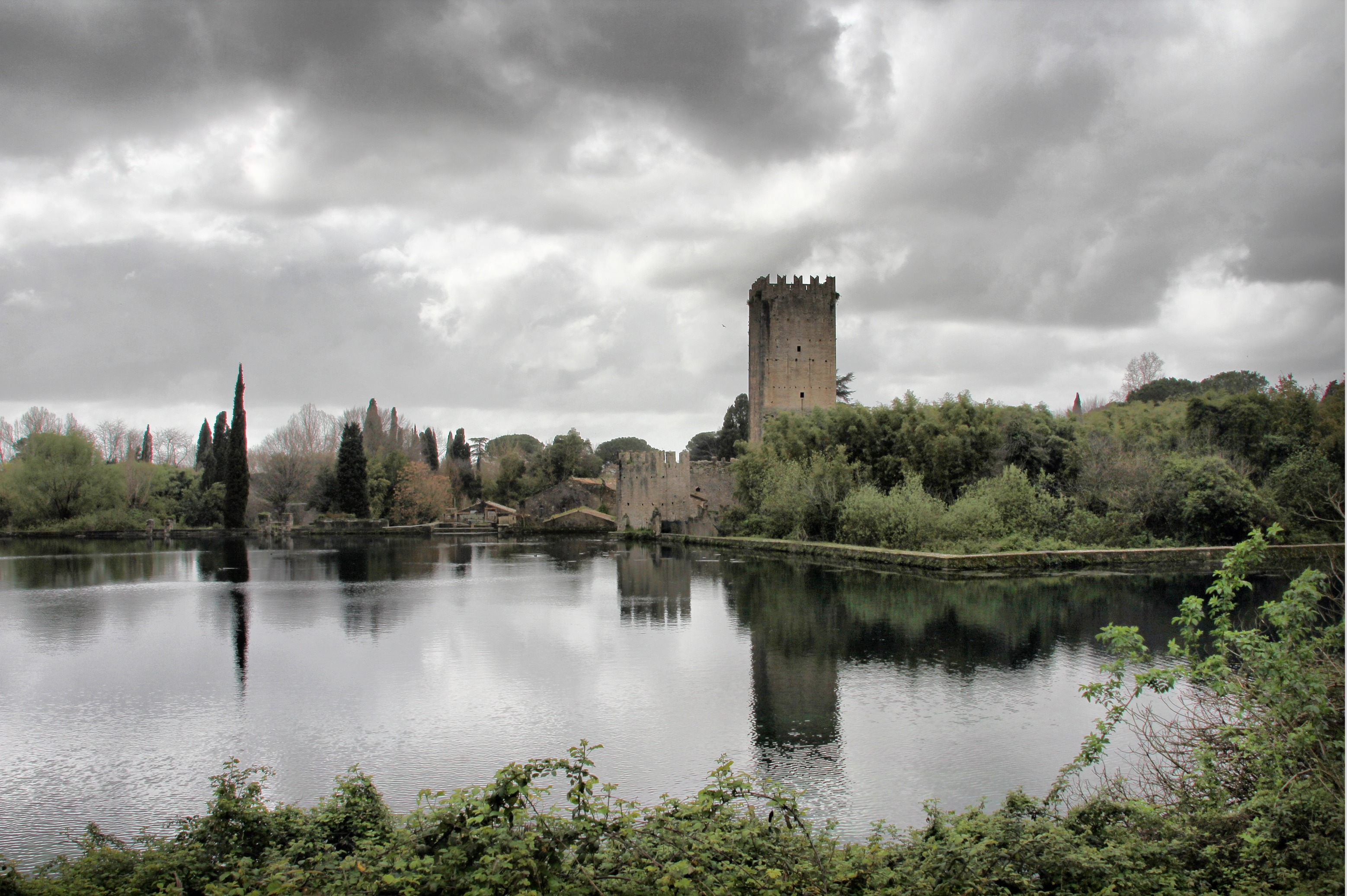
View from the lake

The garden includes the ruins of the ancient settlement of Ninfa, whose name seems to derive from a classical era nymphaeum, a temple dedicated to nymphs, located on an island in the small lake; nymphs were believed to dwell in mountains and groves, by springs and rivers, and also in trees and in valleys and cool grottoes. According to Charles Quest-Ritson's book Ninfa: The Most Romantic Garden in the World, the Gardens of Ninfa's first documented evidence is from Pliny the Younger, who described a temple on the premises dedicated to water nymphs.

The village already existed in the Roman era as a small village in an agricultural area. It was perhaps founded by the Volscians at the feet of the Monti Lepini. In the Middle Ages it was a rich town on the Appian Way. In 1159, Pope Alexander III was crowned there. In 1171 the Holy Roman Emperor Frederick Barbarossa sacked and burned it, after the Pope, his enemy, had taken refuge in the town.

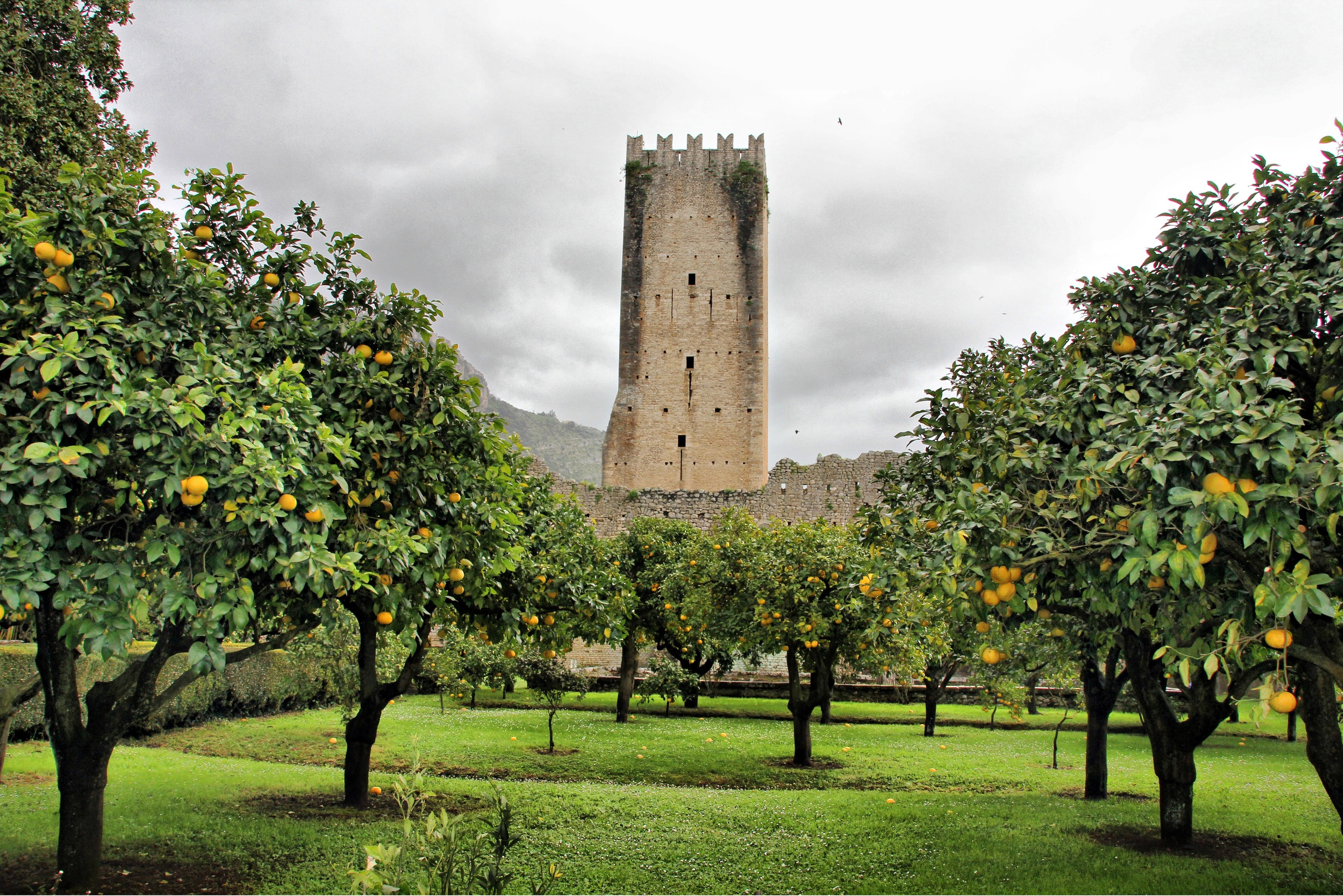
View of the park

During the Middle Ages Ninfa had more than 150 houses, several churches, mills, bridges, two hospices, a castle and a town hall. The town was encircled by a defensive wall 1,400 metres (1,500 yd) in length with guard towers.

The castle was built in the 12th century, located near the lake, outside the city walls. Santa Maria Maggiore was the town's primary church and was most likely built from the 10th century and widened in the first half of the 12th century.

The Church of Saint John is dated around the 11th century and is now in ruins. The original structure most likely had a single nave with several lateral chapels and a semicircular apse, of which parts remain. Some traces of frescoes are still visible on the walls of the ruins.

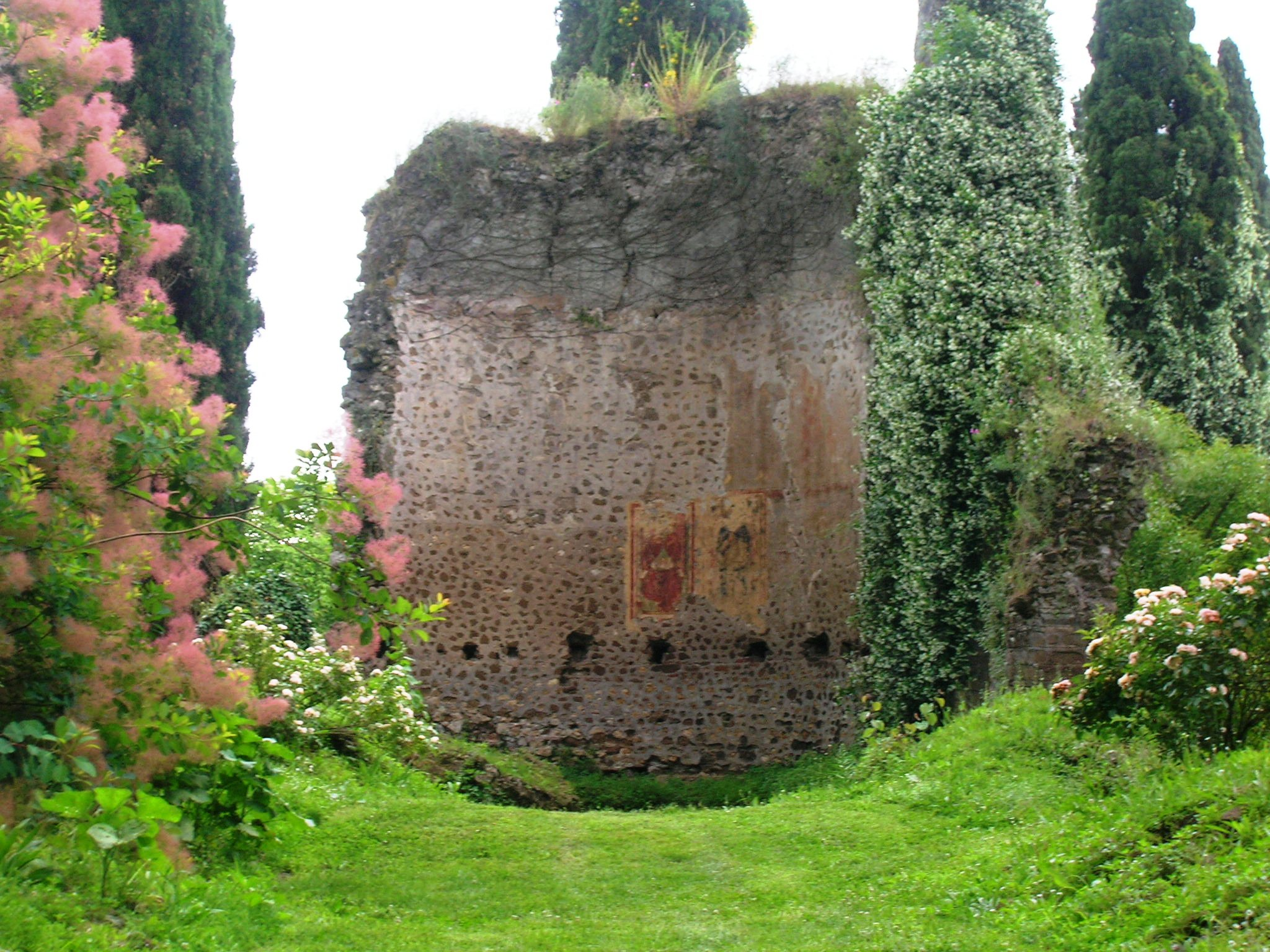
Church of Santa Maria Maggiore: ruins with traces of frescoes

In the 16th century Ninfa was repopulated by its inhabitants, under the seigniory of the Caetani. Cardinal Nicolò III Caetani ordered the architect Francesco Perugino to build a garden in the area of Ninfa, but this garden fell into decay soon after the Cardinal's death in 1585. During the 17th century it was gradually deserted due to the expansion of the surrounding marshes and the arrival of malaria.

By the 18th century the last mill was abandoned. In 1765 the town hall was transformed into a barn by Francesco, Duke of Sermoneta, and, at the same time, Pope Pius VI started a reclamation of the marshes, but the project was abandoned. The garden at Ninfa and its surroundings were a neglected part of the domain of the Caetani family until the 20th century, when the estate was renovated and the garden was transformed. The administration of the garden was left to a nonprofit foundation by Lelia Caetani and her husband, Hubert Howard, the last owners. Ownership of the garden was transferred to the Roffredo Caetani Foundation, named after the father of Lelia Caetani-Howard, which continues to manage the garden.

== Garden ==
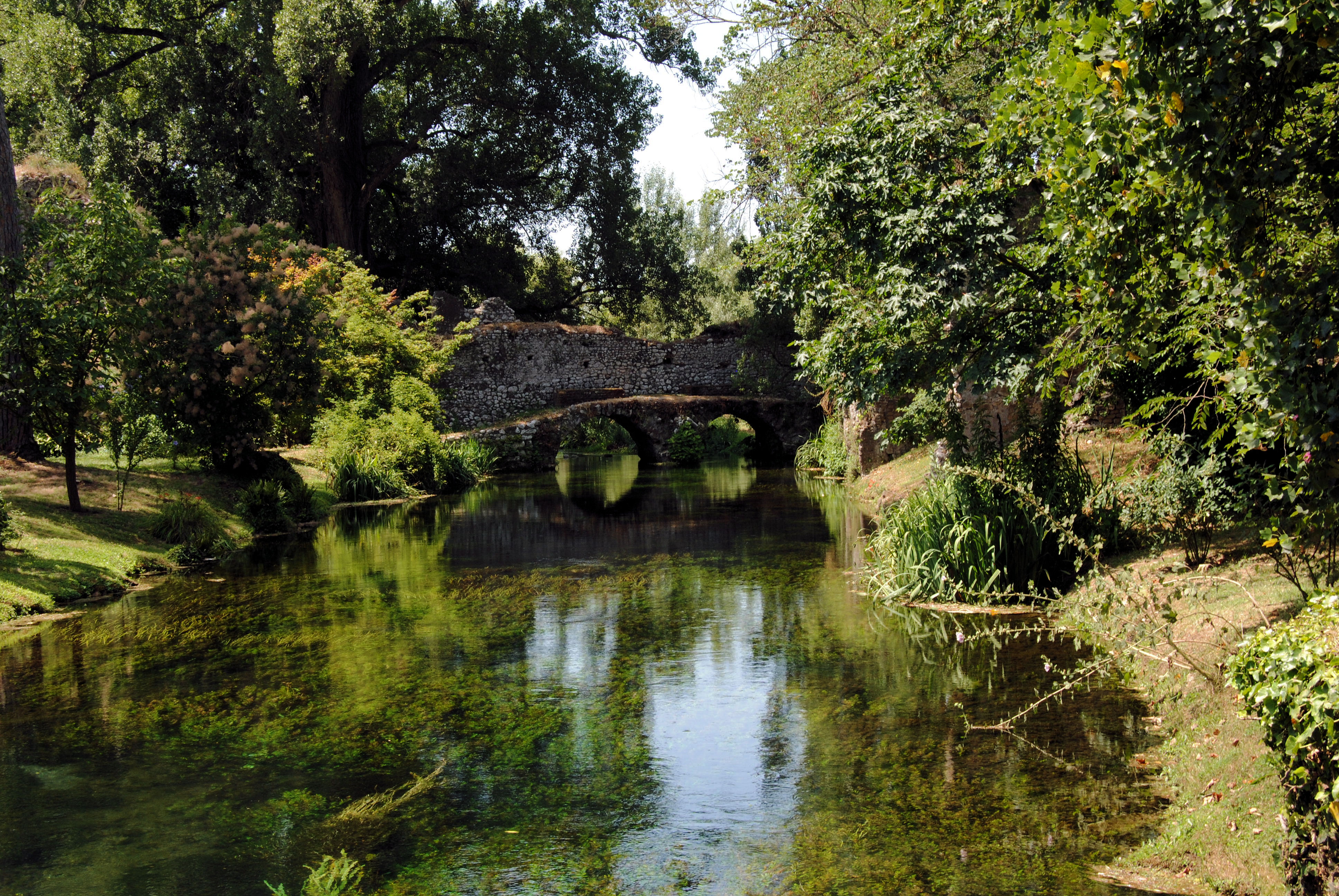
The bridge

The garden was created by Gelasio Caetani beginning in 1921, in the English garden style. Caetani was the son of Lady Constance Adela (Ada) Bootle-Wilbraham and Onorato Caetani, Duke of Sermoneta. He restored some of the buildings of the medieval town of Ninfa, especially the tower and the town hall, as a summer residence. At the same time, under the guidance of Ada Bootle-Wilbraham, who had already created a garden at Lake Fogliano, he began to plant different plant species that he brought home from his travels abroad. The plants thrived due to the favourable climate: the microclimate is very humid because of frequent rains and the river Ninfa.

Quest-Ritson's description of the site:

The garden at Ninfa has a unique setting: the ruins of a medieval town near Rome. The site is one of sublime romantic beauty, where time seems to stand still. The garden has achieved cult status among the English and American gardening cognoscenti.

The garden has been called the world's most romantic garden, also because of its location: it is "a romantic oasis of fertility in the midst of the heavily-industrialised Pontine Plain to the South East of Rome".

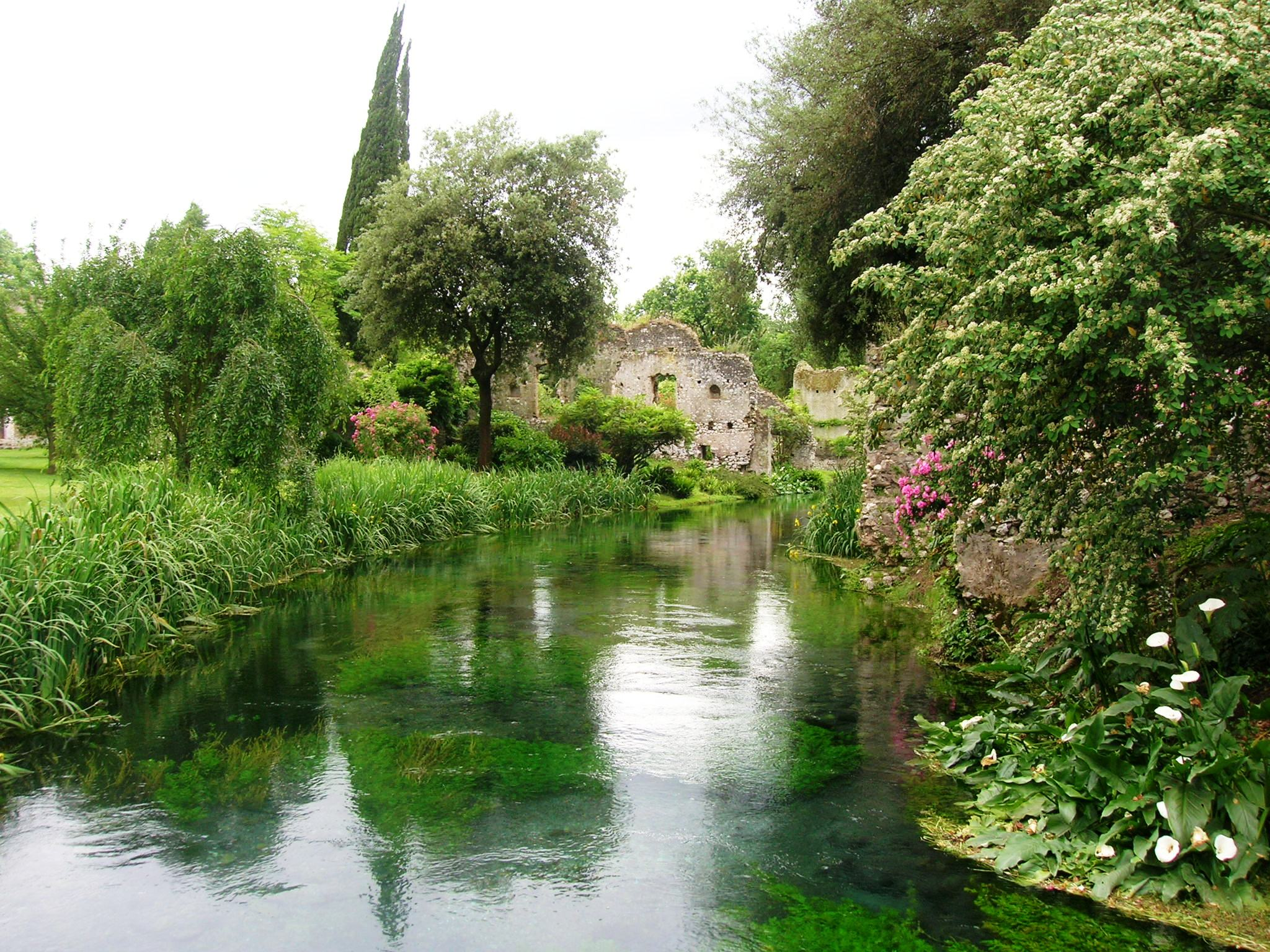
The river Ninfa

The garden is crossed by numerous small springs as well as the river Ninfa, which flows south of the garden. Restoration of the garden involved importing plant species from all over the world. There are over a thousand varieties of plants and trees, such as American walnuts, several ornamental apples, yuccas, Cotinus coggygria, catalpa, cedar trees and many rose bushes, including multicoloured Rosa x odorata 'Mutabilis', the early yellow Rosa hugonis, and the pale pink 'Complicata'. Cultivars grown include the white 'Iceberg', red 'Max Graf', and the following hybrid musk roses: the cream coloured 'Penelope', pink 'Ballerina' and buff coloured 'Buff Beauty'. Many climbing roses are also grown in the garden, including Rosa banksiae, Rosa bracteata, Rosa filipes 'Kiftsgate', known for its vigor and beautiful foliage, the white Rosa 'Mme. Alfred Carriére' and the apricot climbing rose 'Gloire de Dijon'.

The most beautiful garden in the world, Giardini di Ninfa (English subtitles)

Along the main avenue are cypresses, weeping cherry trees, Himalayan pine, banana trees, Mexican pine and lavender. The rock garden contains Iberis, Eschscholzia, Veronica, golden alyssum (Alyssum saxatile), Aquilegia, Dianthus and pomegranates. Purple flowered Clematis armandii, climbing hydrangea (Hydrangea petiolaris), and poplars grow near the bridge; along the river there are groves of hazelnut trees, Acer saccharinum and Liriodendron tulipifera. Near the bridges are maples, poplars, Photinia serrulata, Gunnera manicata, papyrus, Casuarina tenuissima, jasmine, climbing hydrangea, purple flowered Clematis armandii, wisteria, Liriodendron tulipifera, cedars, wattle and a clump of bamboo from China. Magnolia stellata grows in front of the castle.

The garden can be visited only with a guide, following a prescribed route.

== Fauna ==
Ninfa is located on a major flyway of birds migrating from Africa to Europe. The garden, the river and the lake house a rich variety of fauna, including the brown trout, the Mediterranean trout, Salmo cettii, and 152 species of birds. In 1976, under the auspices of the World Wildlife Fund, approximately 1.8 hectares (4.4 acres) within the garden were set aside as a wildlife sanctuary, with brush plantings and wetland creation to encourage birds to nest, and 15 hectares (37 acres) of reestablished native vegetation. Teals, mallards, gadwalls, herons, lapwings and some raptors have since been observed there.

== Infrastructure ==
The garden is located 64km southeast of Rome. It may be reached by regional and Intercity trains from Roma Termini, calling at the station "Latina scalo". From there it is approximately 7km to the garden, which may be done by taxi in 10 minutes. Alternatively, the garden is connected to Rome by the S.S. 148 street.

== Gallery ==
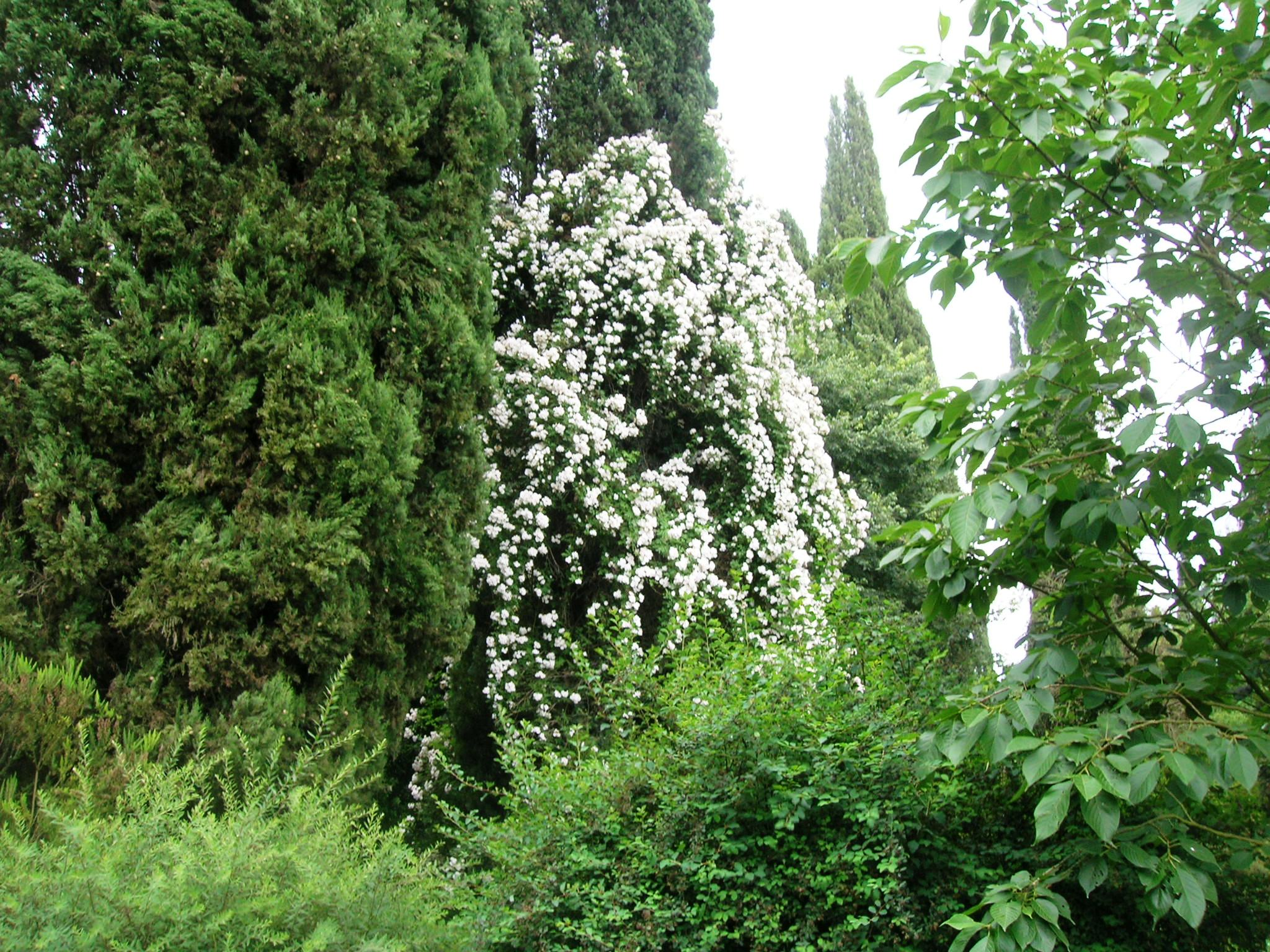
A white climbing rose

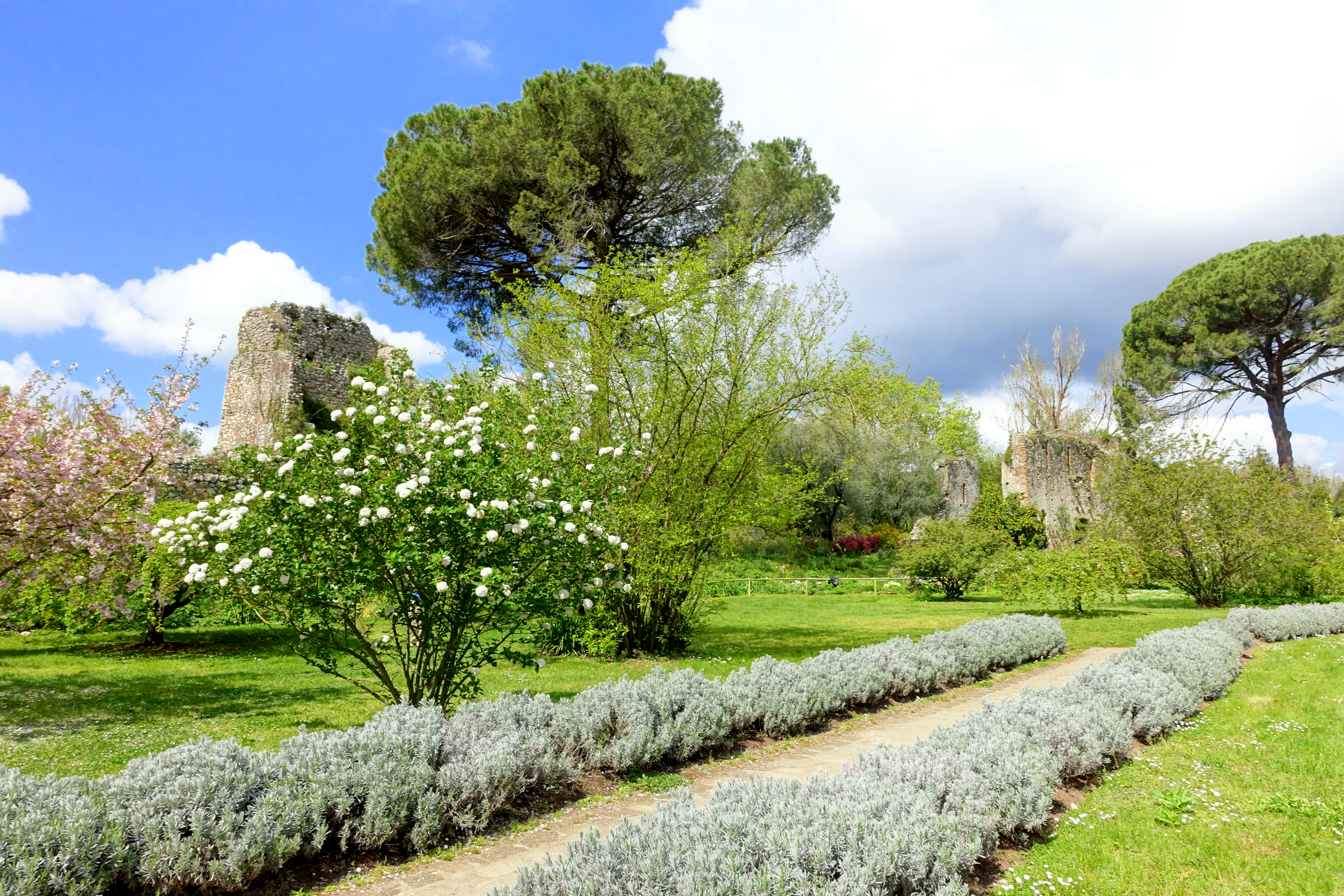
Medieval ruins

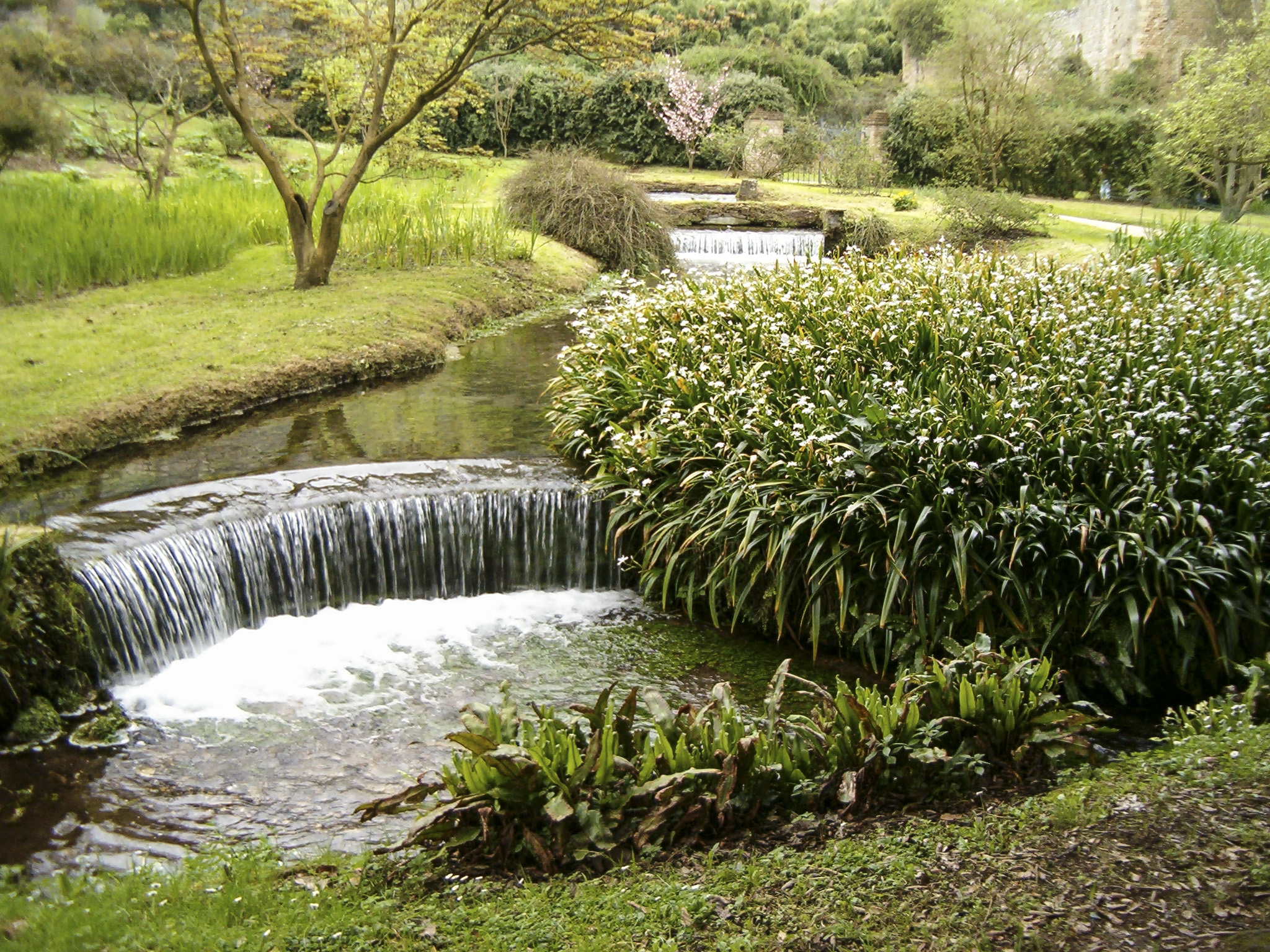
The river

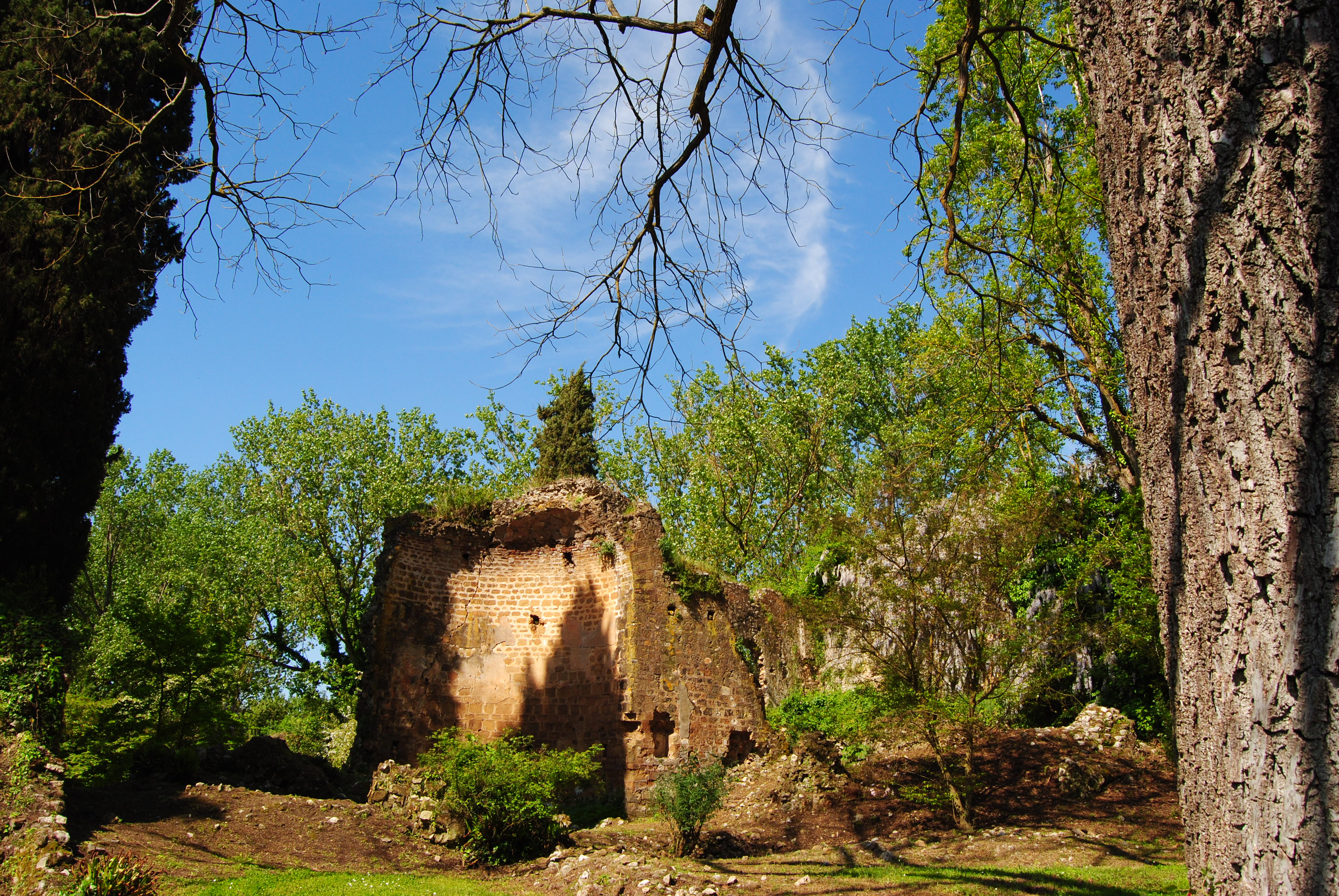
Ruins

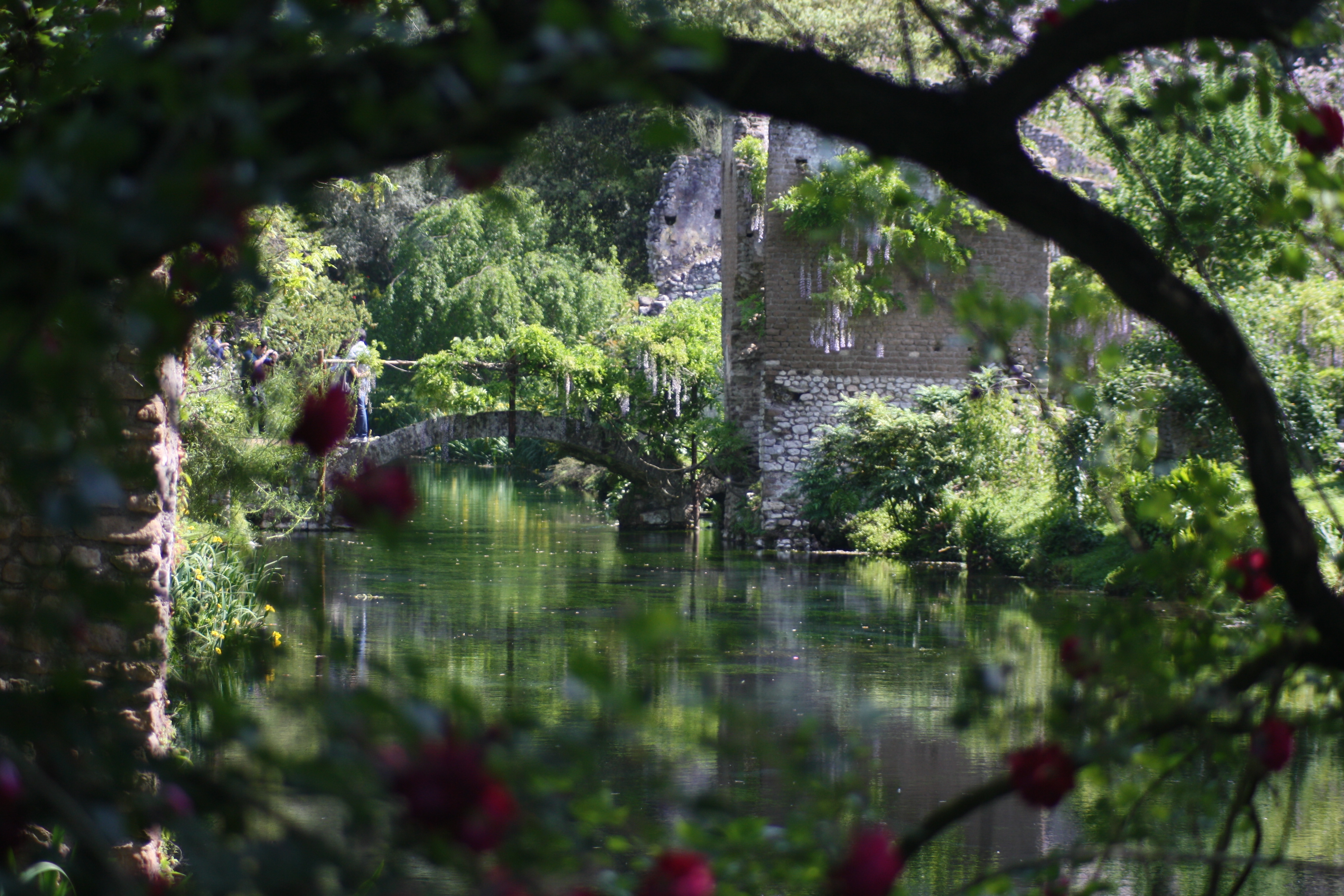
Garden of Ninfa ancient stone bridge

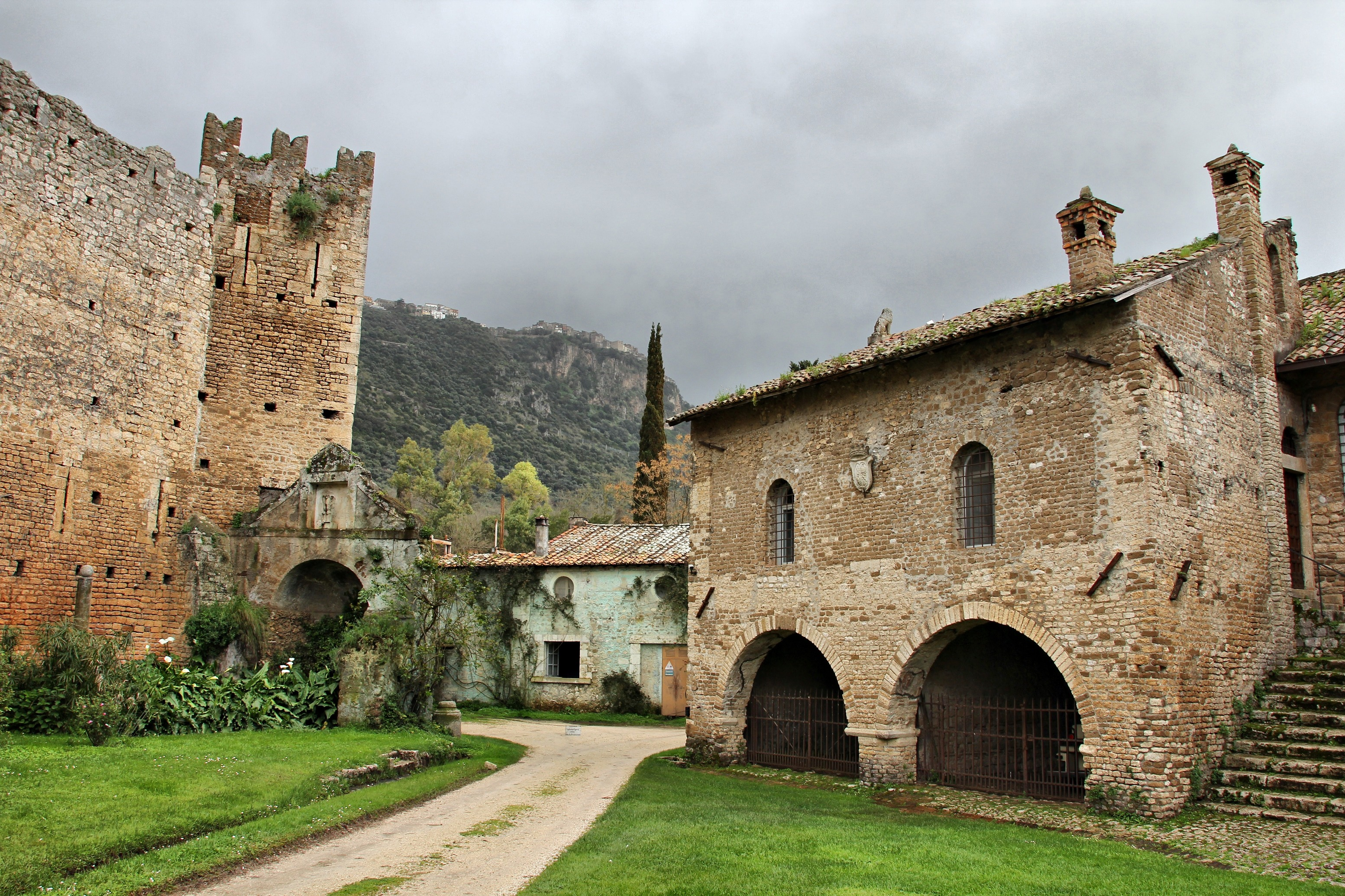
The ruins of the medieval village

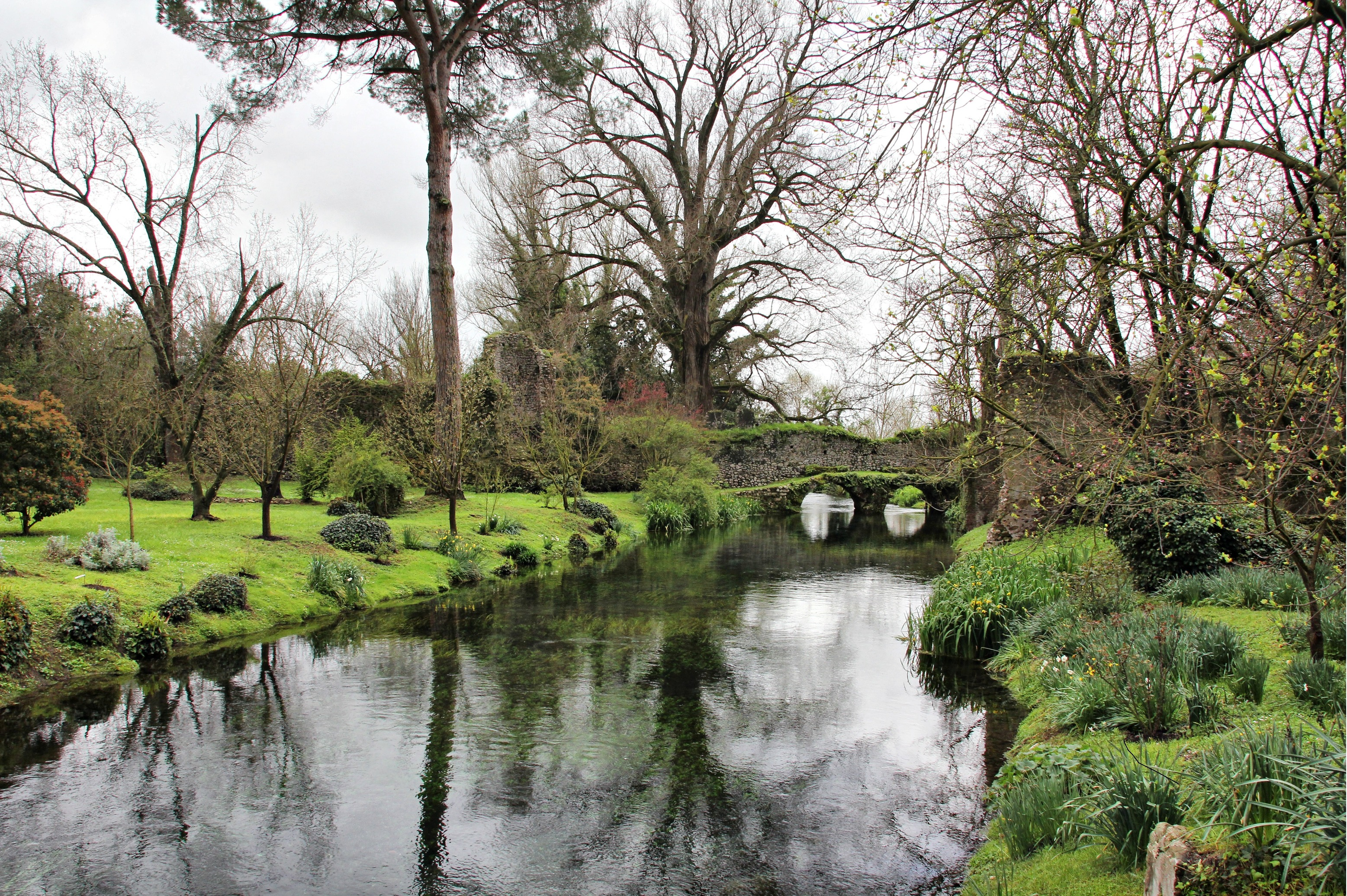
The stream and meadows

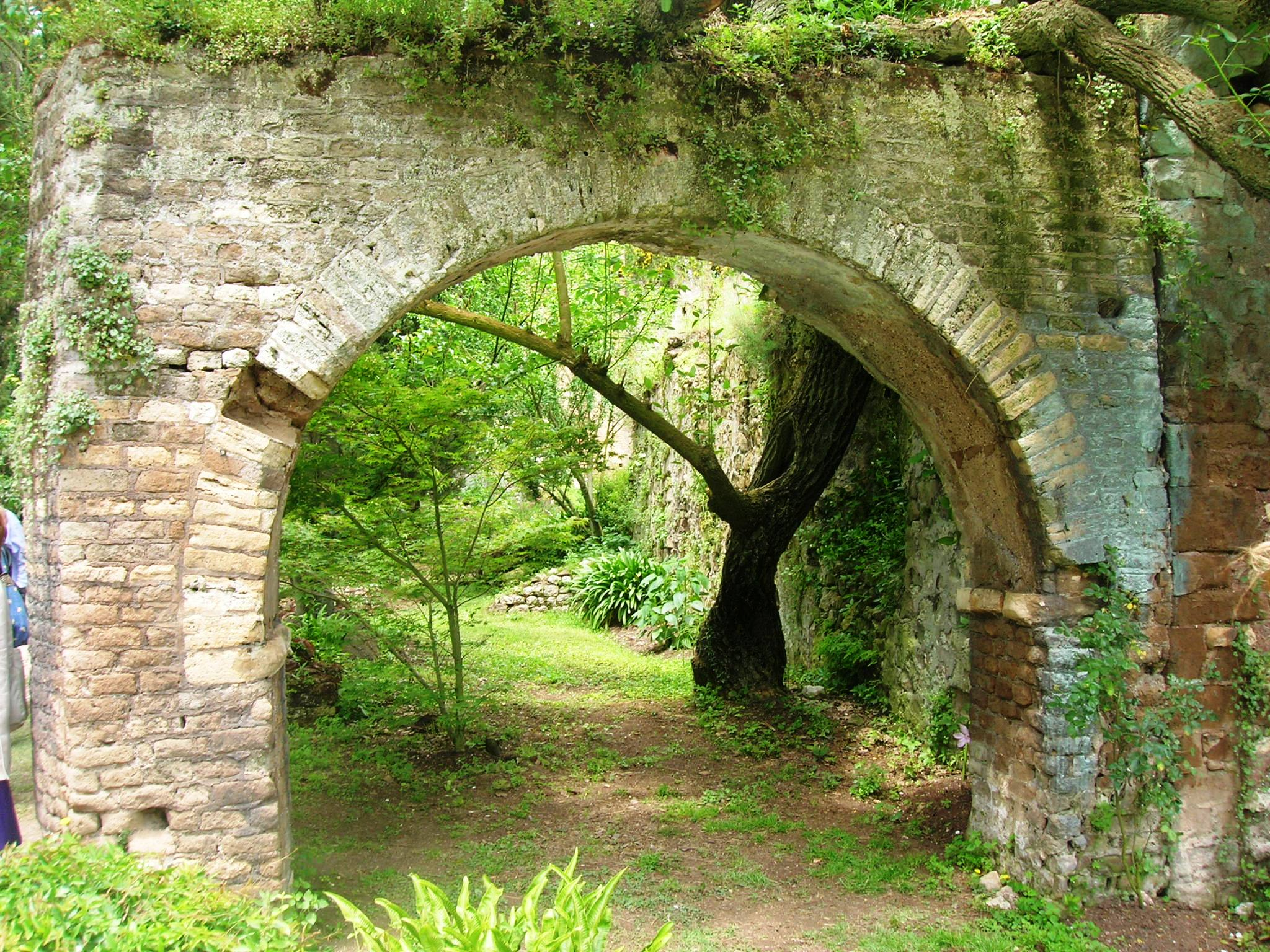
Old arch from the Santa Maria Maggiore church

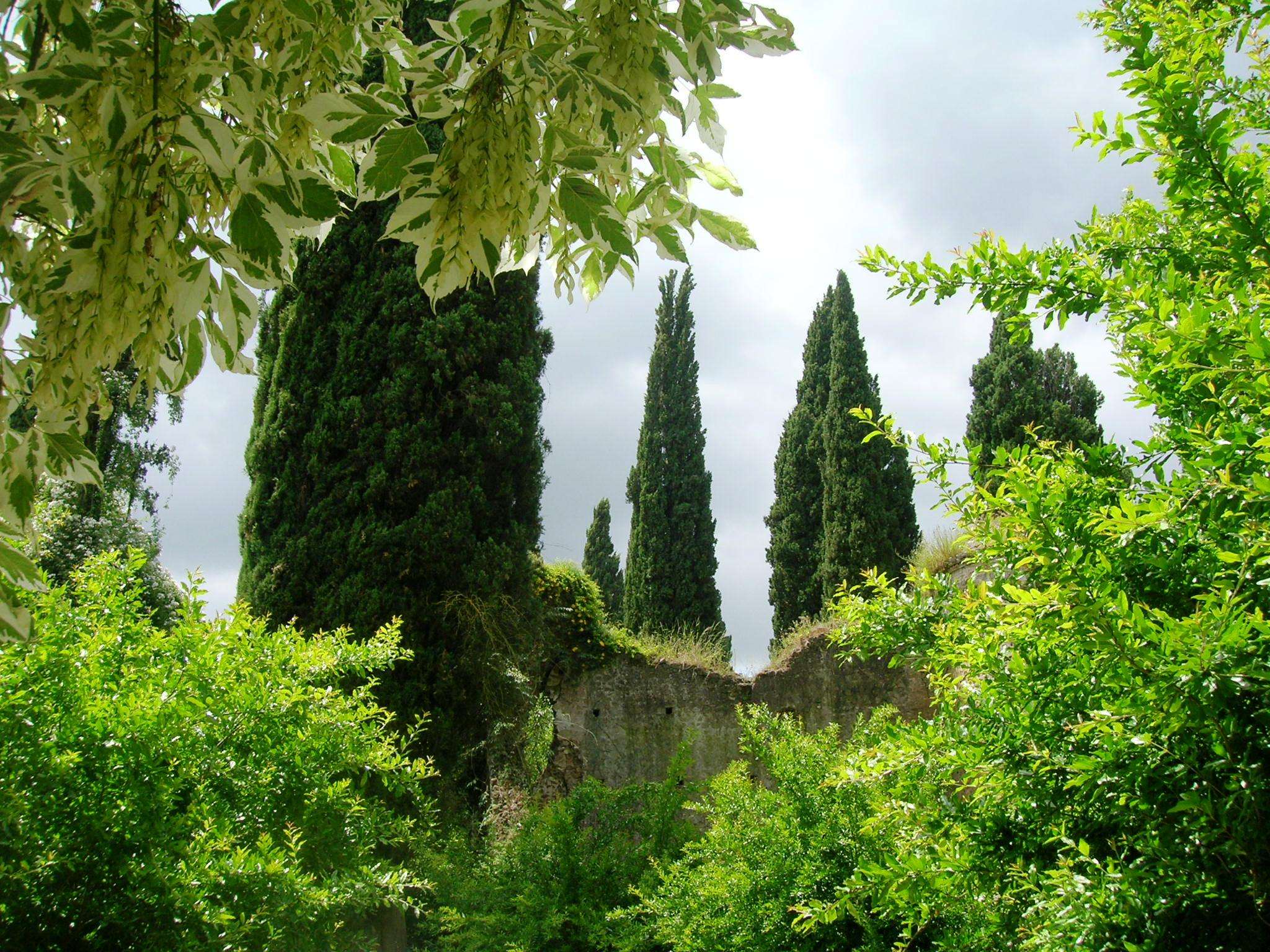
Cypresses

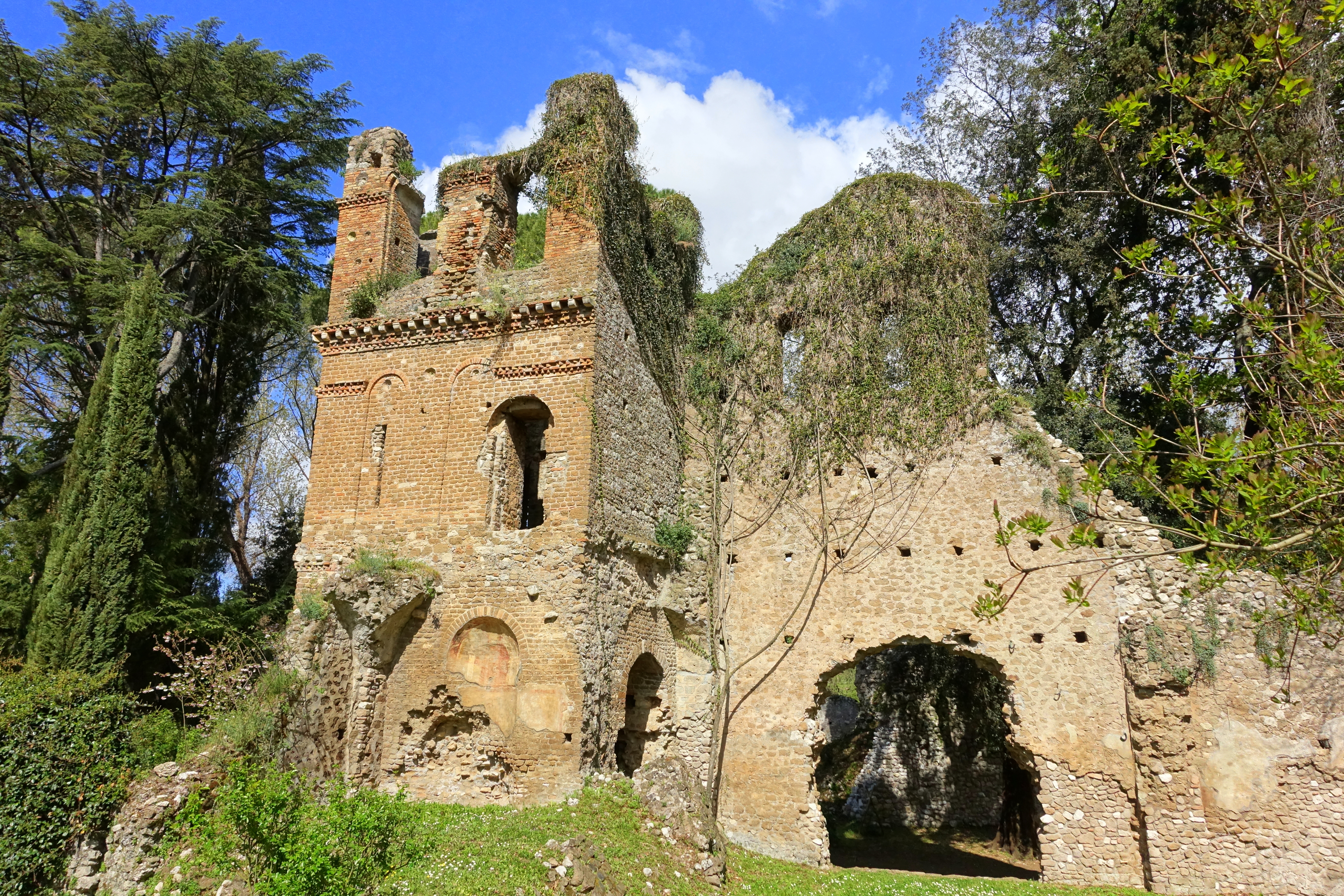
Tower of Santa Maria Maggiore
