= Gerardo Stefanelli =

Italian politician (born 1975)

President of the Province of Latina
- In office 20 December 2021 – 16 March 2026
- Preceded by: Carlo Medici
- Succeeded by: Federico Carnevale

Mayor of Minturno
- Incumbent
- Assumed office 20 June 2016
- Preceded by: Paolo Graziano

Personal details
- Born: 31 January 1975 (age 51) Formia, Lazio, Italy
- Party: UdC (2001–12); PD (2012–19); IV (2020–26); PD (since 2026)
- Education: University of Rome Tor Vergata
- Occupation: Public employee

Gerardo Stefanelli (born 31 January 1975) is an Italian politician who served as president of the Province of Latina from 2021 to 2026. He has also served as mayor of Minturno since 2016.

== Life and career ==
Stefanelli was born in Formia in 1975, but grew up in Scauri. He graduated in law from the University of Rome Tor Vergata in 2001 and subsequently worked as a parliamentary assistant and as a legal-administrative official of the Province of Latina.

Stefanelli began his political career in the Union of the Centre. From 2009 to 2013, he served as assessor for the environment in the provincial administration of Latina led by president Armando Cusani. In 2012, he entered the municipal council of Minturno. He became mayor in 2016 as a Democratic Party candidate, winning 67.5% of the vote in the first round. He was elected to the Provincial Council as a Democratic Party candidate in 2018.

Stefanelli left the Democratic Party in November 2019 and subsequently joined Italia Viva. In December 2021, Stefanelli was elected president of the Province of Latina, supported by a coalition including the Democratic Party, Forza Italia, and civic lists. He defeated Giovanni Agresti, receiving 57.05% of the weighted vote.

In 2024, he stood for the European Parliament in the Central Italy constituency on the United States of Europe list, receiving 9,731 preference votes.

In April 2026, Stefanelli left Italia Viva and announced his intention to return to the Democratic Party. His return was followed by several months of internal discussion before his membership was formally accepted in August 2026, with local political reporting describing the move as one that could alter the balance within the party in the province of Latina. Tensions also emerged between Stefanelli and the party's municipal group in Minturno. In September 2026, a council motion concerning the redevelopment of the Scauri seafront was supported by both the Democratic Party group and the centre-right opposition, prompting a political dispute within the governing majority.
