= Lake Fogliano =

Coastal lake in Lazio, Italy

- Lago di Fogliano
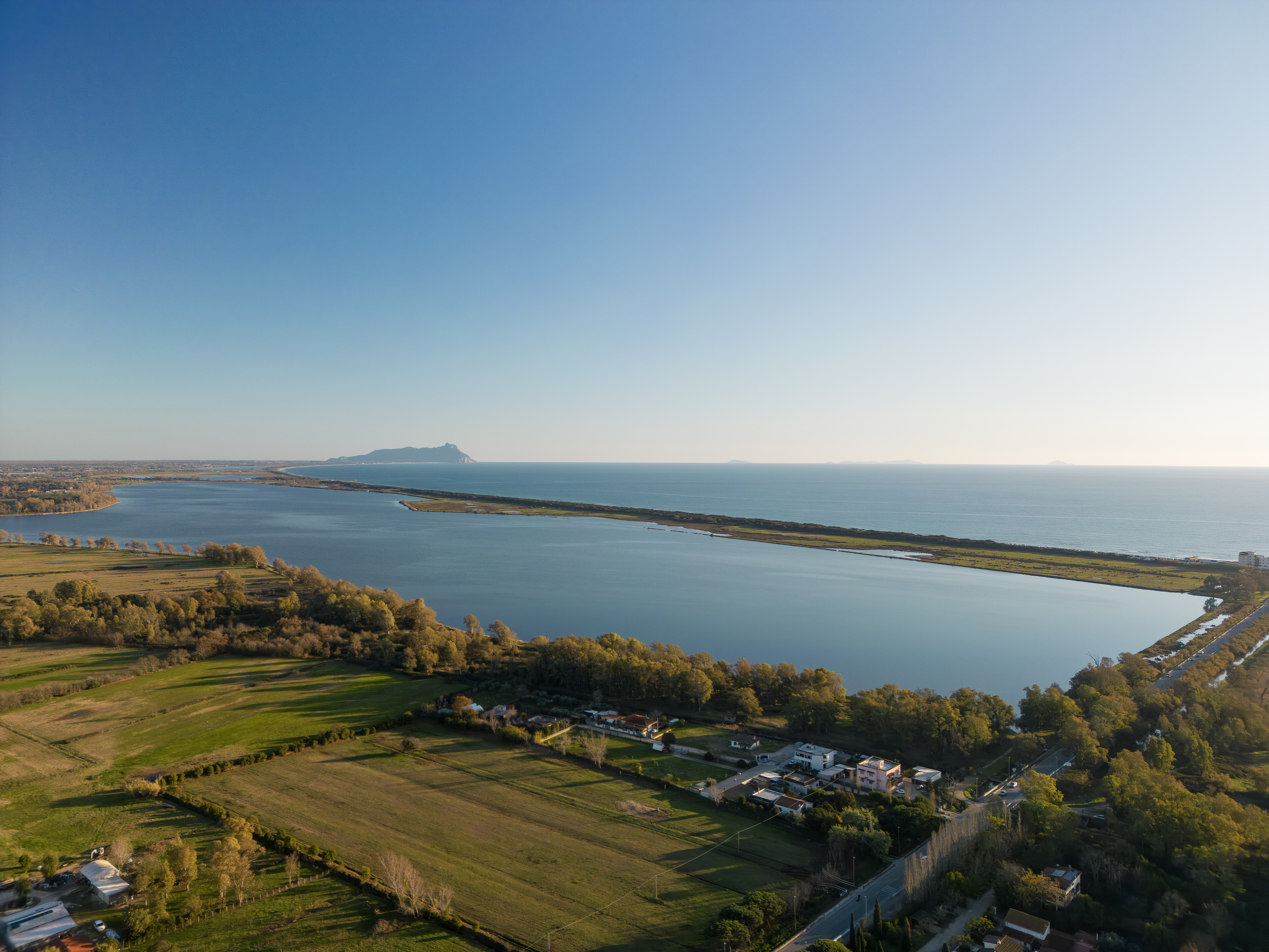

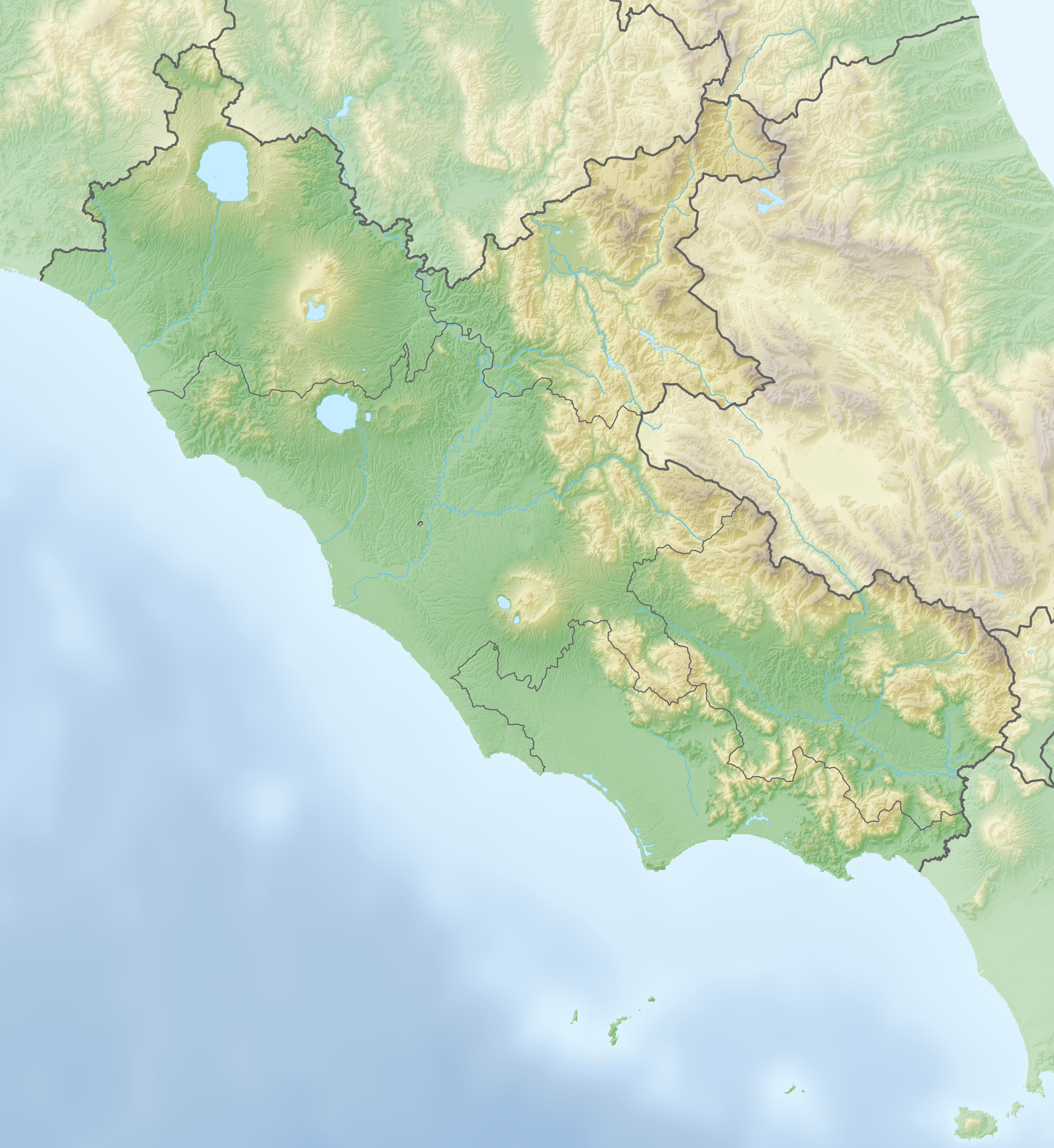
- Location of Lago di Fogliano Lake Fogliano (Lazio)
- Location: Province of Latina, Lazio, Italy
- Coordinates: 41°23′24″N 12°55′12″E
- Type: Lake
- Max. length: 5 km (3.1 mi)
- Max. width: 1.5 km (0.93 mi)
- Surface area: 3.95 km^{2} (1.53 sq mi)
- Max. depth: 2–3 m (6 ft 7 in – 9 ft 10 in)
- Shore length^{1}: 11 km (6.8 mi)
- ^{1} Shore length is not a well-defined measure.

The Lake Fogliano is a lake located in the Province of Latina, in the Agro Pontino, in Lazio. Among the coastal lakes of the pontine region (Fogliano, Caprolace, Monaci, Paola) it is the largest, approximately 395 ha, with an extension towards the sea of about 5 km, a perimeter of about 11 km, and a width of about 1.5 km. Its maximum depth is on the order of 2/3 m. Enclosed by the coastal dune, it collects the waters of the Cicerchia channel.

== History ==
The irregular water regime made the perimeter of the shores indefinable until the 20th century. Following the reclamation of the Agro Pontino by the Opera Nazionale Combattenti, it was embanked and assumed a definitive configuration. Since 1978, it has been part of the protected territory of the Circeo National Park, classified as a wetland of international importance (Ramsar Convention).

In this area, scrapers, arrowheads, and other traces of human presence from prehistory have been found. The Romans carried out significant reclamation works, transforming it into a center for animal husbandry and fishing, building pools and channels to better exploit the lake's wealth. After a period of abandonment, the Fogliano area, which came under papal influence, flourished again. Sermoneta, Ninfa, and the lakes of Fogliano and Caprolace formed a single thriving estate that Pope Boniface VIII (Benedetto Caetani, 1294) entrusted to the Caetani family.

The Caetani family enriched the area with new buildings: in 1742, the hunting lodge was built to host the Count of Albany and the Cardinal of York, nephews of James II Stuart, during their hunting expeditions. In 1877, the manor house and the so-called "English Villa" were built. Subsequent alterations led to a complete change in the architecture of the manor house and the hunting lodge, which now form a single structure, incorporating the remains of the ancient church of S. Andrea, later replaced by a neo-Gothic chapel located near the villa.

== Villa Fogliano ==
The inhabited nucleus of Borgo Fogliano, originally formed by families dedicated to fishing, gave its name to the lake and the Villa Fogliano of the Caetani family.

== Botanical garden ==
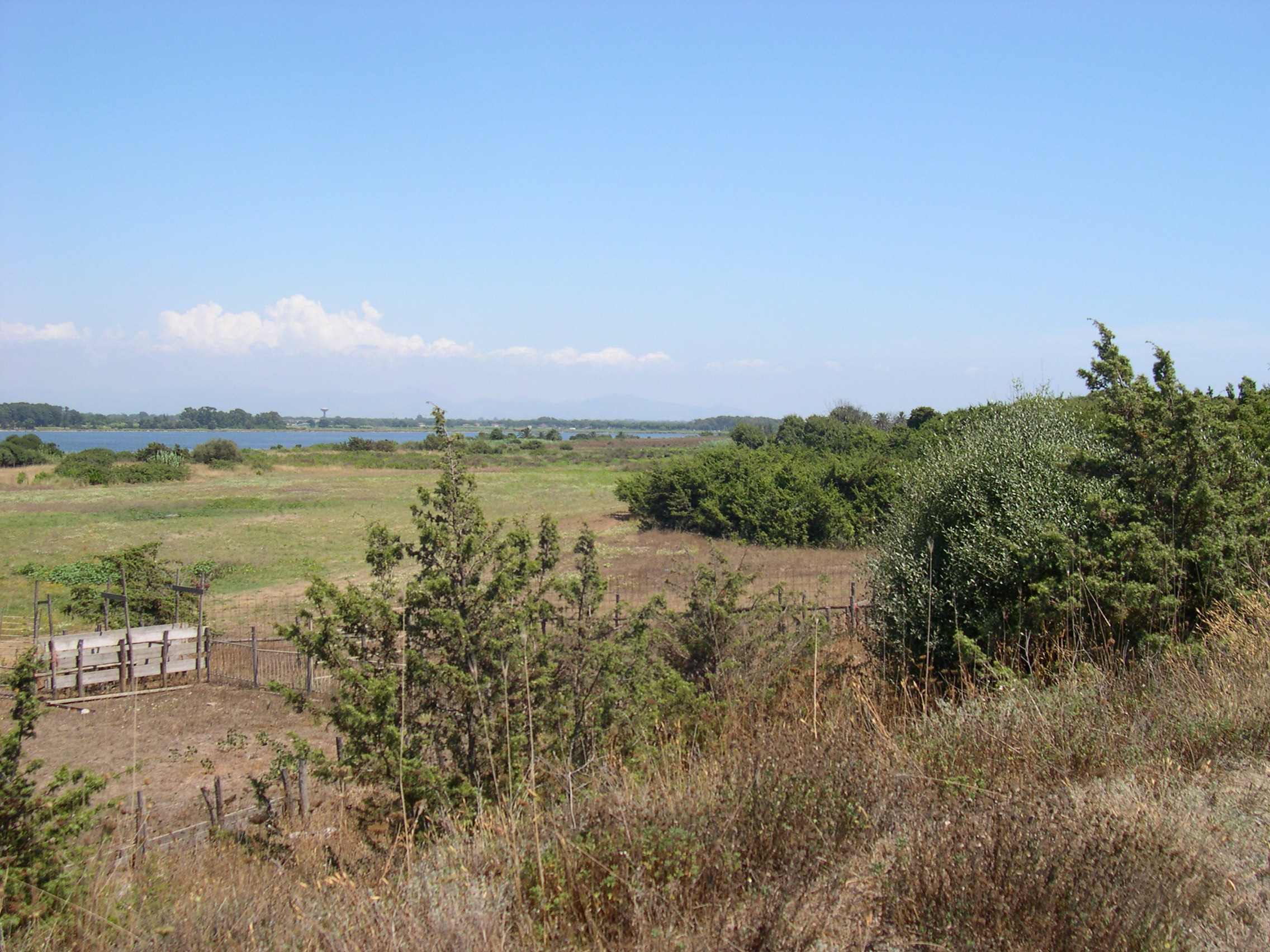
Lake Fogliano

The botanical garden of Villa Fogliano was born as an exotic garden at the end of the 19th century, by the will of Ada Bootle Wilbraham, wife of Onorato Caetani, who introduced exotic species, particularly palms.

In later times, the Caetani family devoted themselves to the creation of the Garden of Ninfa, neglecting Fogliano. In the 1920s, in the botanical garden of Fogliano, due to lack of maintenance, a spontaneous process of naturalization began, creating a unique situation, with Mediterranean species (holm oak, dwarf palm, laurel) alongside palms, eucalyptus, and araucaria.

The particular climatic conditions ensure that some of these species regenerate spontaneously, thus enriching the biological variety of the area. Thanks to the characteristic fragrances of the Mediterranean maquis, the numerous sensory stimuli offered by the environment, and the extreme variety of shapes and sizes of the species present in the botanical garden, a path for the visually impaired has been created.

In recent years, as in the rest of Lazio, the problem of infestation by the red palm weevil (Rhynchophorus ferrugineus) has emerged here, a parasite that attacks palms and is proving resistant to various control techniques applied. The palms on the lake's shore, which served as a backdrop for some scenes of Ben-Hur, have been affected
