= Antonio Corona =

President of the Province of Latina
- In office 21 March 1989 – 6 November 1991
- Succeeded by: Severino Del Balzo

Mayor of Latina
- In office 1972–1980
- Preceded by: Vincenzo Tasciotti
- Succeeded by: Delio Redi
- In office 1983–1985
- Preceded by: Delio Redi
- Succeeded by: Delio Redi

Personal details
- Born: 29 September 1933 Foggia, Kingdom of Italy
- Died: 10 October 1994 (aged 61) Latina, Lazio, Italy
- Party: Christian Democracy

Antonio Corona (29 September 1933 – 10 October 1994) was an Italian politician of the Christian Democracy party who served as mayor of Latina and president of the Province of Latina.

== Life and career ==
Born in Foggia, he moved during his youth to Sicily and later settled in Latina for work. He joined Christian Democracy, aligning with the party's Iniziativa democratica faction led by Amintore Fanfani.

He served as mayor of Latina from 1972 to 1980 and again from 1983 to 1985. He was later president of the Province of Latina from 1989 to 1991.

In the early 1990s, Corona was involved in the Mani pulite investigations into political corruption and was arrested in 1992 for illicit party financing. He was released the following day and spent 15 days under house arrest. He died in 1994 after a cancer illness.
