= Vetica =

Town in Italy

- Town
- Interactive map of Vetica
- Country: Italy
- Region: Lazio
- Province: Latina
- Comune: Monte San Biagio

Population (2011)
  - Total: 33

Vetica is a town located in the Latina province of Italy.

According to a 2011 estimate, the settlement had a population of 33 individuals. It is also located 296 m above sea level.

It is the starting point of the active "Sentiero delle fate" ("Trail of the fairies").
