= Petrella =

Petrella may refer to:

- Monte Petrella, a peak in the Aurunci Mountains in central Italy
- Petrella Liri, a frazione (parish) in the Province of L'Aquila in Italy
- Petrella Salto, a comune (municipality) in the Province of Rieti in Italy
- Petrella Tifernina, a comune (municipality) in the Province of Campobasso in Italy
- Petrella v. Metro-Goldwyn-Mayer, Inc., a 2014 United States Supreme Court copyright case about the Raging Bull movie
- SS Petrella, sunk 1944
- Petrella (surname)
