= Ajmone Finestra =

Italian politician

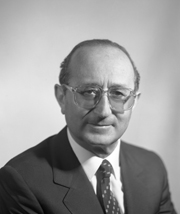
- Born: Ajmone Finestra; 4 February 1921; Todi, Kingdom of Italy
- Died: 26 April 2012 (aged 91); Latina, Italy
- Occupation: politician
- Height: 1.63 m (5 ft 4 in)
- Spouse: Maria Pia Salvini
- Children: 2

Ajmone Finestra (4 February 1921 – 26 April 2012) was an Italian Fascist war criminal and later right-wing politician who served as Senator (1979–1987) and Mayor of Latina (1993–2002).

== Biography ==
A native of Umbria, he moved to Littoria in 1934—a city founded after the reclamation of the Agro Pontino—following his father, who was an executive at the Opera Nazionale Combattenti.

During the RSI period, Finestra joined the Italian Social Republic and, after the war, the newly formed Italian Social Movement. For thirty-six years, he served as the provincial secretary for the province of Latina.

Tried for war crimes, Prosecutor Oscar Luigi Scalfaro sought the death penalty for him. The judge who replaced him recognized mitigating circumstances, resulting in a reduced sentence. He was later granted amnesty.

In 1972, he was elected for the first time as a regional councilor for Lazio on the MSI ticket and held that position for a decade.

Elected to the Senate for the first time in 1979, he served on the Senate of the Republic (Italy); re-elected to the Senate in 1983, he also served on that same committee during the 9th legislature.

In the 1993 elections, he was elected mayor of Latina in a runoff with 57.5% of the vote. He was the first mayor of Latina to be directly elected by the citizens. In the subsequent 1997 elections, Finestra ran as an independent because, having rejected the “Svolta di Fiuggi,” he did not join National Alliance (Italy). He was re-elected mayor in the first round with 62.8% of the vote and remained in office until 2002, when he was succeeded by Vincenzo Zaccheo.

In 2002, he was elected vice president of the National Union of Veterans of the Italian Social Republic, and he became its president in 2003.

He died in Latina on April 26, 2012, at the age of 91.
