= Damiano Coletta =

Italian politician (born 1960)

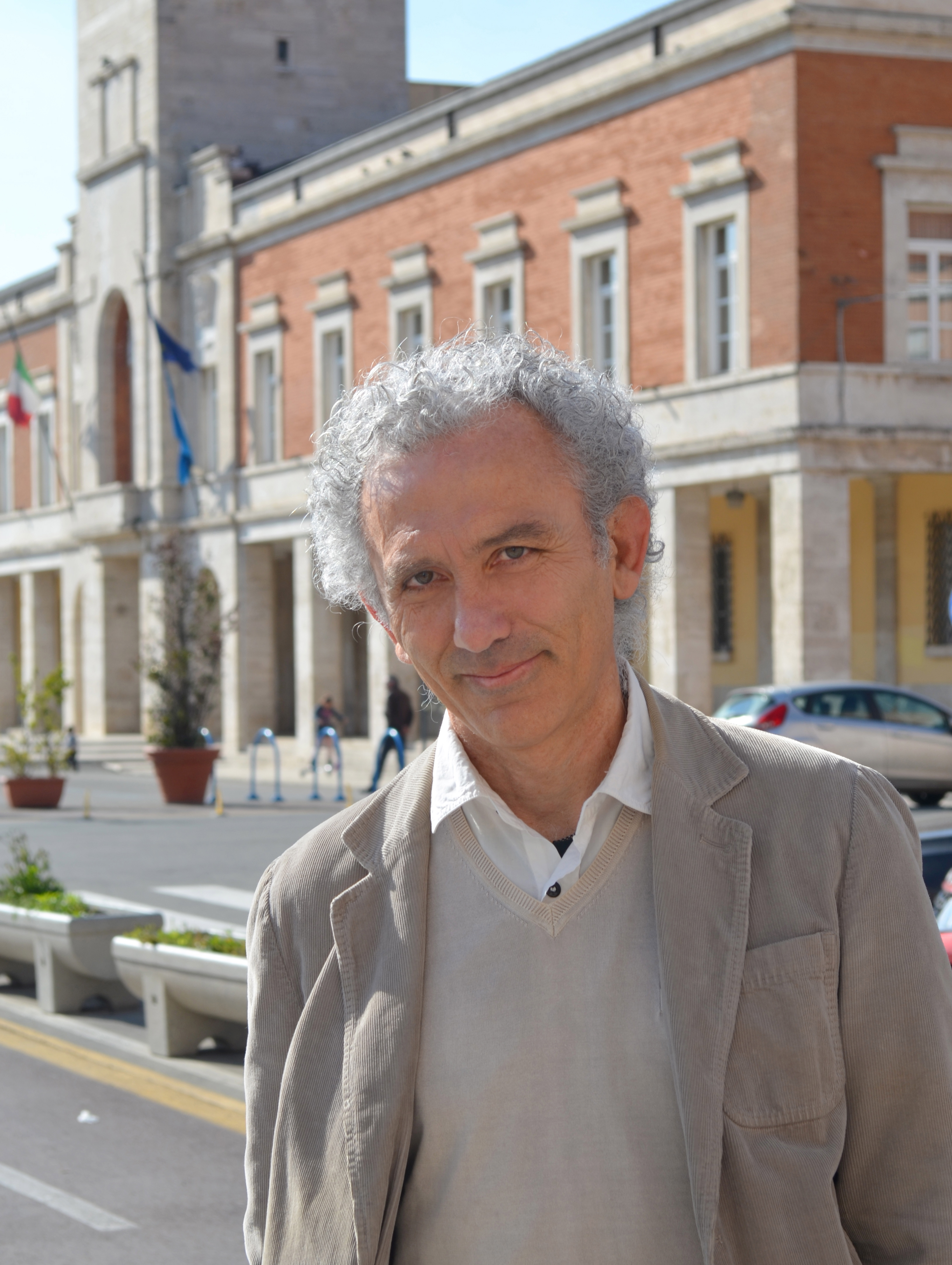

Mayor of Latina
- In office 20 June 2016 – 29 September 2022
- Preceded by: Giovanni Di Giorgi
- Succeeded by: Matilde Celentano

Personal details
- Born: 7 December 1960 (age 65) Latina, Lazio, Italy
- Party: Italia in Comune
- Height: 1.83 m (6 ft 0 in)
- Education: Sapienza University of Rome
- Profession: Physician, former footballer

Damiano Coletta (born 7 December 1960 in Latina) is an Italian politician, physician and former footballer.

Coletta ran as an independent for the office of Mayor of Latina at the 2016 Italian local elections, supported by a centre-left coalition. He won and took office on 20 June 2016.

== See also ==
- 2016 Italian local elections
- List of mayors of Latina

Political offices
Preceded by Giovanni Di Giorgi	Mayor of Latina; 2016–2022	Succeeded by Matilde Celentano
