= Aurunci Mountains =

Mountain range in Italy

- Monti Aurunci
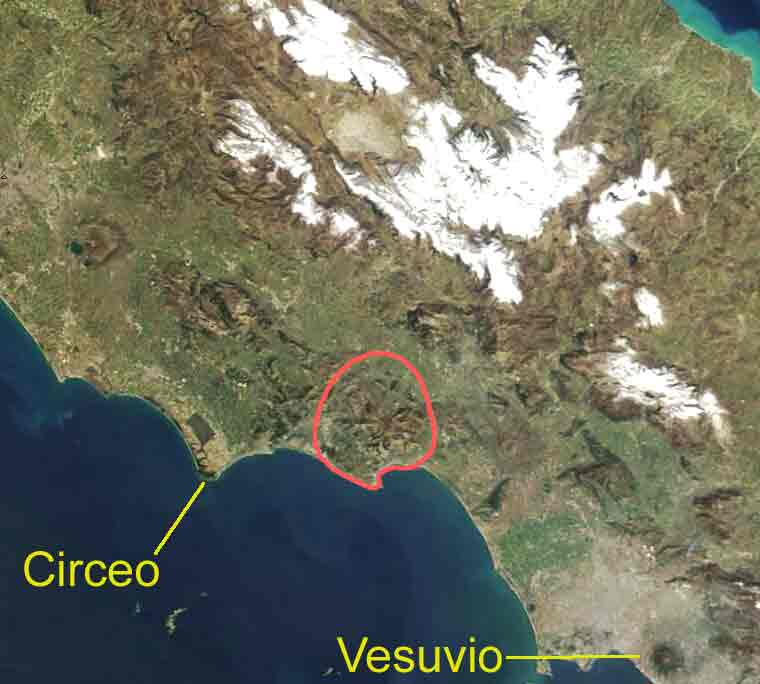
- Location of the range in Italy

Highest point
- Peak: Monte Petrella
- Elevation: 1,533 m (5,030 ft)
- Coordinates: 41°19′22″N 13°39′55″E

Naming
- Etymology: Ancient tribal name

Geography
- Country: Italy
- Region: Lazio
- District(s): Latina, Frosinone
- Range coordinates: 41°21.25′N 13°39.3′E
- Parent range: Apennine Mountains, Volsci Chain
- Borders on: Monti Ausoni, Liri River, Garigliano river; Tyrrhenian Sea

Geology
- Orogeny: Southern Apenninic Orogeny
- Rock age(s): Messinian of Miocene, Pliocene-Pleistocene
- Rock type: limestone karst

The Monti Aurunci (or Aurunci Mountains) is a mountain range of southern Lazio, in central Italy. It is part of the Antiappennini, a group running from the Apennines chain to the Tyrrhenian Sea, where it forms the promontory of Gaeta. It is bounded to the north-west by the Ausoni Mountains, to the north by the Liri river, to the east by the Ausente, to the south-east by the Garigliano and to the south by the Tyrrhenian sea. The line between the Aurunci and the Ausoni has not been clearly established but the Aurunci are considered by convention to be east of a line through Fondi, Lenola, Pico, S. Giovanni and Incarico. Altitudes vary from hills to the 1,533 m of Monte Petrella. Main peaks include the Redentore (1,252 m) and Monte Sant'Angelo (1,402 m). They include a regional park, the Parco Naturale dei Monti Aurunci, created in 1997.

The mountains take the name from the ancient tribe of the Aurunci, an offshoot of the Ausoni. Both tribes were derived from the Italic people who were called by the Romans the Volsci; hence, the Monti Lepini, the Monti Ausoni and the Monti Aurunci are also called the Volsci or Volscian Chain. Coincidentally they are all of the same karst topography and have the same orogeny, which is not quite the same as the Apennines proper.

== Geology ==
The Monti Aurunci mainly consist of friable limestone, which becomes harder toward Gaeta. The degree of faulting and cracking is so high that the mountains retain no rainfall; it sinks in to emerge as springs (and used as wells) on the lower flanks. The stream beds are dry except for vernal pools.

Most generally, the western-central coastal region of Italy is the front of a subduction zone where the African Plate moving locally from southwest to northeast is carried under the European Plate. There is some counterclockwise rotation of Italy; hence the faults in the Tyrrhenian Sea slip both parallel to the shoreline and perpendicular to it.

The surface rock in the Anti-Apennines was deposited on the floor of Tethys Sea during the Jurassic and Cretaceous of the Mesozoic. This lighter calcareous rock rides over the front of the subduction zone, uplifted by compressional and isostatic forces. Just behind it is a zone of crustal thinning caused by extensional forces; i.e., the subduction and the rotation cause a wave of compression with a peak under the Anti-Apennines and a valley in the Tyrrhenian Sea. The result is a karst-graben or half-graben landform with the Volscian Mountains as karst and the coastal chain of Pontine marshes, South Pontine marsh, Terracina Basin, Gaeta Basin and Volturno Basin as graben.

This landform began to appear in the Messinian stage of the Miocene, about 7.2 to 5.3 million years ago. It went on to mature in the Pliocene. Also in this time volcanic activity associated with the faults and the weakening of the crust over the subduction created the volcanic zones of Latium and Campania, which intruded into the karst-graben, mainly on the karst side. In the Pleistocene the basins slowly filled with sediment from the weak run-off of the mountains, accelerating with the deforestation of modern times.

== Ecology ==
=== Fauna ===
Of the Amphibians, Urodela are found at around 557 m (1,827 ft) and Anura at around 314 m (1,030 ft) in vernal pools, springs and wells. The salamanders are Salamandrina perspicillata, Triturus carnifex, Lissotriton italicus and Lissotriton vulgaris; the frogs are Bufo bufo, Bufo viridis, Hyla intermedia and Rana italica.

The Garigliano Nuclear Power Plant was constructed from 1959 to 1963 by General Electric on the Garigliano River, the water of which they used for cooling, on the border of the Monti Aurunci. It was intended to provide electrical power to the region. After several accidental releases of radioactive gas and water the plant ceased operation in 1978 but continued to be used as a storage facility for radioactive waste, which was stored under the plant. Subsequent flooding carried the waste downstream into the Gulf of Gaeta. The effect on the ecology was toxic. One study reports:

In fact the genetic damage observed in studies performed with the micronucleus test applied on wild rodents from the Piana del Garigliano resulted among the highest recorded in Italy.

Additional studies were unable to tie anomalies of the skull and teeth in the area's rodents to contamination from the power plant; maybe they are attributable to a naturally high radiational level caused by the volcanic intrusions in the rock. The lower Garigliano remains sparsely populated.

Transparency table In 2011, the Transparency Table for the disposal of the Garigliano nuclear power plant was established in the Campania Region, with the resolution of G.R. n. 163 of 29/4/2011, integrated by the resolution of G.R. n. 428/2011. With the decree of the President of the Giunta n. 253 of 11/11/2011, the members of the Table were appointed, as identified by the bodies to which they belong, and the Regulations for its functioning were approved [14].

Disputes over possible radioactive leaks In April 2014, some articles appeared on the net referring to the results of studies conducted at the beginning of the 1980s at ENEA, CNEN and SIMP (Italian Society of Mineralogy and Petrology) concerning the contamination of the Garigliano and part of the Gulf of Gaeta by radionuclides from the power plant. [15]

The articles refer to the "Proceedings of the Italo-French Convention of Radiation Protection - Florence 30 May, 1 June 1983", to the study conducted within ENEA entitled: "Influence of Geomorphological Factors on the distribution of Radionuclides - An example: from M. Circeo to Volturno "(by A. Brondi, O. Ferretti, C. Papucci) and to the" Report no.38 of the Italian Society of Mineralogy and Petrology "[16], which in turn refers to the results of the environmental research conducted at the end of the 1970s from CNEN.The plant, thanks to the EIA (Environmental Impact Assessment) obtained in 2009, has started decommissioning with Sogin (the Italian state company responsible for the dismantling of Italian nuclear plants and for the management and safety of radioactive waste) which is owner since 1999: by 2028 it is expected that the 268,150 tons of waste and 5,739 tons of radioactive waste will be adequately treated, for a total cost of 383 million euros. The "skeleton" of the structure, however, will remain standing as the "architectural heritage of our country".

== See also ==
- Geography of Italy

== Sources ==
- Romano, Antonio; Montinaro, Gianpaolo; Mattoccia, Marco; Sbordoni, Valerio (2007). "Amphibians of the Aurunci Mountains (Latium, Central Italy). Checklist and conservation guidelines". Acta Herpetologica. 2 (1): 17–25. Archived from the original (pdf) on 23 July 2011.
