= Monte San Biagio =

- Comune
- Comune di Monte San Biagio
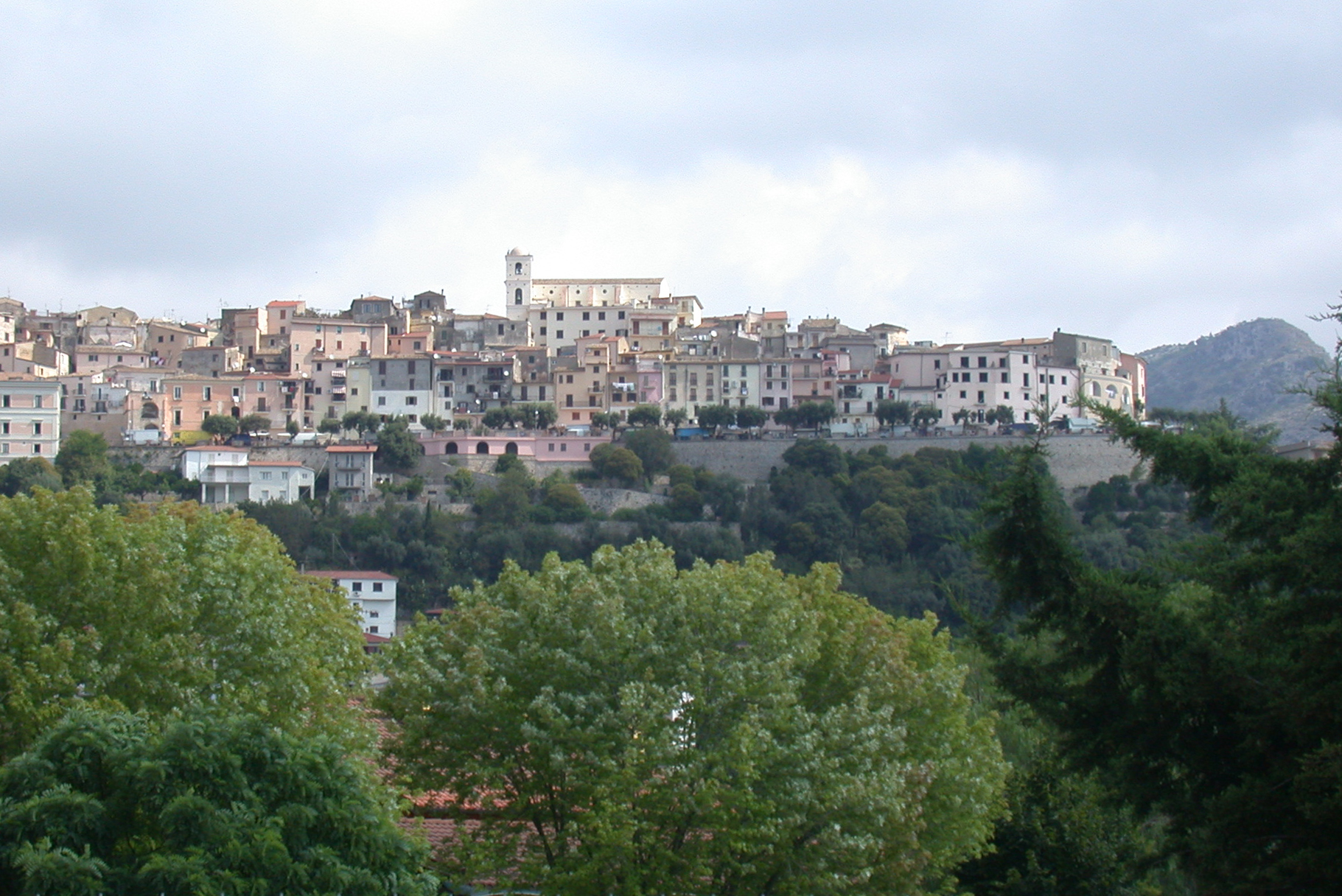
- View of Monte San Biagio

- Coat of arms

- Location within Italy Location within Lazio
- Coordinates: 41°21′N 13°21′E
- Country: Italy
- Region: Lazio
- Province: Latina (LT)
- Frazioni: Campo Marinella, Pieterte, San Vito, Valle Viola Bassa, Vallemarina, Vallemarina Iannace, Vallemarina Scorzaro, Vetica

Government
  - Mayor: Federico Carnevale

Area
  - Total: 66 km^{2} (25 sq mi)
- Elevation: 133 m (436 ft)

Population (31 March 2017)
  - Total: 6,324
  - Density: 96/km^{2} (250/sq mi)
- Demonym: Monticellani
- Time zone: UTC+1 (CET)
  - Summer (DST): UTC+2 (CEST)
- Postal code: 04020
- Dialing code: 0771
- Patron saint: St. Blaise
- Saint day: February 3
- Website: Official website

Monte San Biagio (Southern Laziale: Muntciegl) is a town and comune in the province of Latina, in southern Lazio (Italy). It is located on the slope of a hill part of the Monti Ausoni. Until 1862 it was known as Monticello.

== History and main sights ==
The Roman presence in Monte San Biagio's territory is testified by the presence of a mausoleum attributed to Emperor Galba, a native of the area, but which probably belonged to Sextus Iulius Frontinus, who had a great villa in the vicinity. The Romans defeated the Samnites here, at the Passo della Portella: in the place a fortified gate was built, which was later used as the border customs of the Kingdom of Naples. Nearby is a watchtower from the period of Pope Sixtus V.

The origins of the modern town date back to the Middle Ages, when a castle was built here (over the Roman ruins), firstly as a stronghold of the Duchy of Gaeta, and later of the Duchy of Fondi. The first document mentioning the Castrum Monticelli, however, dates from 1099, from the archives of Monte Cassino. In the following centuries it was a fief of Fondi, a possession of the dell'Aquila family from 1145. Later it was ruled by the Colonna, the Carafa, the Mansfeld and the Di Sangro, as part of the Kingdom of Naples.

In the winter of 1788 the town was sacked by the French army, while, after the Bourbon restoration and the subsequent unification of Italy, the neighbourhood was the base of brigandage. In 1862 the name was changed to Monte San Vito and, soon thereafter, to the current Monte San Biagio.

== Transportation ==
Monte San Biagio lies next to the Via Appia, once the main road from Rome to Campania. It is also connected by a branch of the Via Flacca from Terracina to Gaeta.

The town is served by a railway station on the mainline between Rome and Naples.

== Traditions and gastronomic specialities ==
There are several dishes particular to Monte San Biagio, some using shrimp from the local lakes, and wild asparagus. The pork sausages are particularly distinctive, usually handmade from the meat and lard of the pig, mixed with chilli pepper and coriander seed.

It is also home to 300 hectares (740 acres) of cork oak woods, one of the few areas of production outside of Sardinia.

The communes of Monte San Biagio, Sonnino and Terracina itself are those sanctioned to produce Moscato di Terracina wines, the finest of which come from vineyards on the southeast-facing slopes of the coastal hills.

The plains of Monte San Biagio, south of Monti Ausoni, are primarily used for agriculture including the growth of kiwi, olives, pears, citrus fruits, and many types of vegetables.

== Climate ==
Monte San Biagio has a Mediterranean climate (Köppen climate classification: Csa), with hot, dry summers and mild, humid winters.

== Twin cities ==
- Saint-Romain-le-Puy, France
- Übersee, Germany
