= Valentino Orsolini Cencelli =

Italian politician (1898–1971)

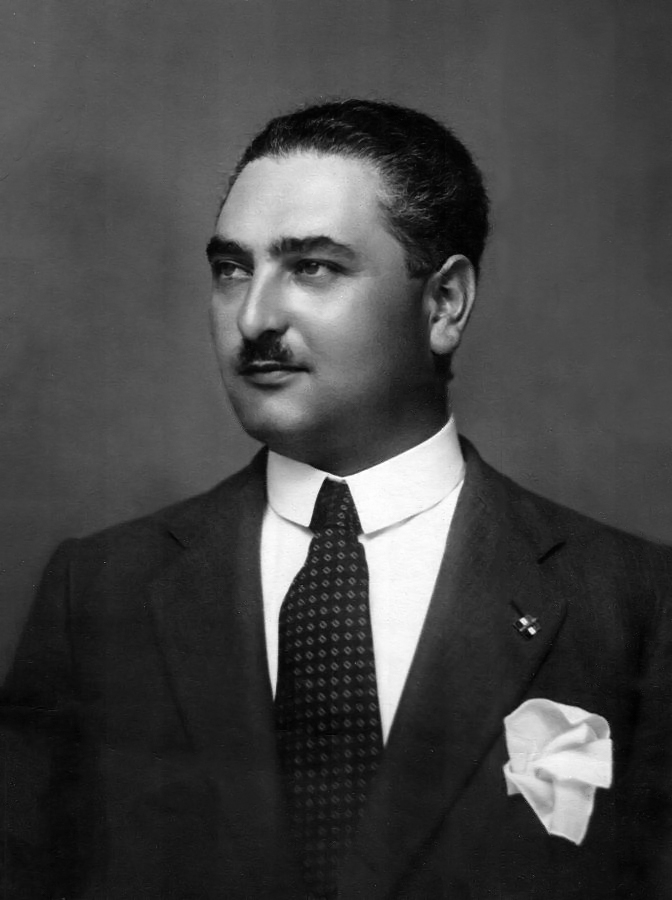
Valentino Orsolini Cencelli

Valentino Orsolini Cencelli (7 February 1898 – 22 May 1971) was an Italian agronomist and politician, who served as Deputy (1924–1939), member of the Chamber of Fasces and Corporations (1939–1943), and the first Podestà of Littoria (1932–1933).

He was one of the protagonists of the land reclamation of the Pontine Marshes.
