= List of presidents of the Province of Latina =

President of the Province of Latina
- Presidente della Provincia di Latina
- Incumbent; Federico Carnevale since 16 March 2026
- Term length: 4 years
- Formation: 1934

The president of the Province of Latina is the head of the provincial government in Latina, Lazio, Italy. The president oversees the administration of the province, coordinates the activities of the municipalities, and represents the province in regional and national matters.

Since March 2026, the office has been held by Federico Carnevale of the centre-right coalition.

== History ==
The Province of Latina was established in 1934 by the Fascist government. Local autonomy had been abolished and provincial administrations were placed under central control, with appointed officials replacing elected presidents.

After the establishment of the Italian Republic, the office was restored and the president was again elected by the Provincial Council starting from 1951. In 1995, a reform introduced the direct election of the president by popular vote. The Province of Latina was eventually reformed in 2014 under national legislation on provinces, with its functions reduced in favour of the Lazio region and local municipalities.

== List ==
=== Presidents of the Province (1951–present) ===
| No. | Portrait | Name | Term of office | | Party |
| No. | Portrait | Name | Start | End | Party |
|---|---|---|---|---|---|
| | | ? | ? | ? | ? |
| | | Antonio Corona | 21 March 1989 | 20 July 1990 | Christian Democracy |
| | | Antonio Corona | 20 July 1990 | 6 November 1991 | Christian Democracy |
| | | Severino Del Balzo | 19 November 1991 | 10 November 1994 | Italian Republican Party |
| | | Amodio Di Marzo | 4 January 1995 | 24 April 1995 | Italian People's Party |
| | | Paride Martella | 24 April 1995 | 14 June 1999 | Christian Democratic Centre |
| | | Paride Martella | 14 June 1999 | 14 June 2004 | Christian Democratic Centre |
| | | Armando Cusani | 14 June 2004 | 8 June 2009 | Forza Italia; The People of Freedom |
| | | Armando Cusani | 8 June 2009 | 6 November 2013 | Forza Italia; The People of Freedom |
| | | Salvatore De Monaco (acting) | 6 November 2013 | 12 October 2014 | National Alliance |
| | | Eleonora Della Penna | 12 October 2014 | 29 April 2018 | Civic list |
| | | Carlo Medici | 29 April 2018 | 20 December 2021 | Democratic Party |
| | | Domenico Vulcano (acting) | 4 October 2021 | 20 December 2021 | Forza Italia |
| | | Gerardo Stefanelli | 20 December 2021 | 16 March 2026 | Italia Viva |
| | | Federico Carnevale | 16 March 2026 | Incumbent | Independent (centre-right) |

== Sources ==
- AA.VV. (2005). Latina. Territorio antico, provincia moderna. Capurso: L'Orbicolare.
- Sottoriva, Pier Giacomo (2024). Per i 90 anni della Provincia di Latina. 18 dicembre 1934 - 18 dicembre 2024. Provincia di Latina.
- "Storia amministrativa dell'ente". Ministero dell'Interno.
