= Petrella (surname) =

Petrella is an Italian surname, and may refer to:

- Bob Petrella (born 1944), American football player
- Clara Petrella (1914–1987), Italian operatic soprano
- Errico Petrella (1813–1877), Italian opera composer
- Gianluca Petrella, Italian jazz trombonist
- Ian Petrella (born 1974), American actor and puppeteer
- Ivan Petrella (born 1969), Argentine social theorist
- Marina Petrella (born 1954) a former member of Red Brigades
- Patrick Petrella, a fictional Spanish-English police detective created by Michael Gilbert
- Riccardo Petrella (born 1941), Italian political scientist and economist
- Vito Petrella (born 1965), Italian sprinter

== See also ==
- Petrella (disambiguation)
