= Federico Carnevale =

Italian politician (born 1964)

President of the Province of Latina
- Incumbent
- Assumed office 16 March 2026
- Preceded by: Gerardo Stefanelli

Mayor of Monte San Biagio
- Incumbent
- Assumed office 27 May 2014
- Preceded by: Gesualdo Mirabella

Personal details
- Born: 29 October 1964 (age 61) Fondi, Province of Latina, Italy
- Occupation: Engineer

Federico Carnevale (born 29 October 1964) is an Italian politician serving as president of the Province of Latina since 2026. He has served as mayor of Monte San Biagio since 2014.

In the 2026 provincial election, Carnevale, supported by the centre-right coalition of Forza Italia, Brothers of Italy, Lega and Us Moderates, was elected president of the Province of Latina, defeating centre-left candidate Barbara Petroni. He received 71.03% of the vote, compared with 28.97% for Petroni.
