= Lago dei Monaci =

Lake in Italy

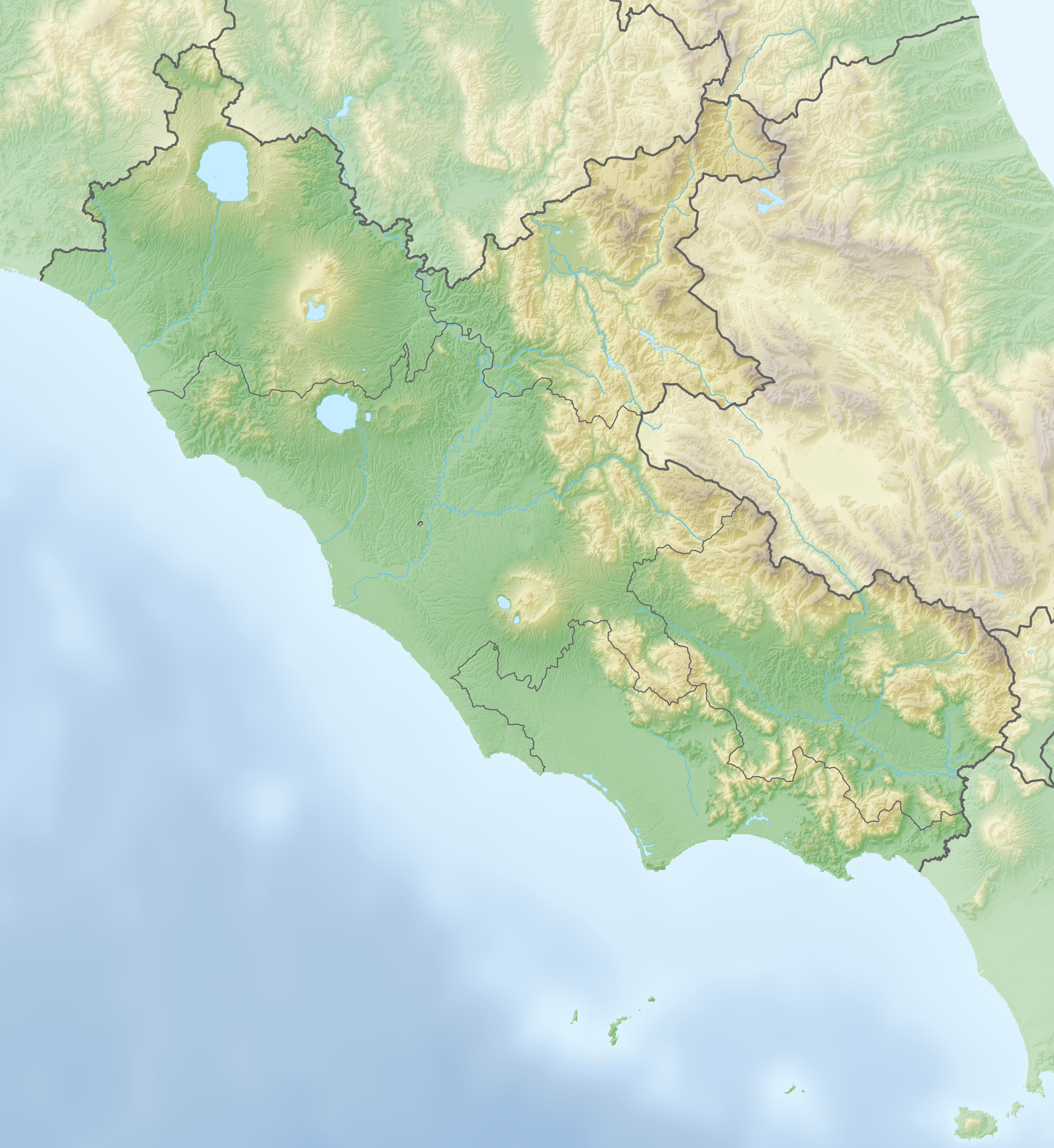
- Location within Lazio Location within Italy
- Location: Province of Latina, Lazio
- Coordinates: 41.3803°N 12.9333°E
- Primary inflows: none
- Primary outflows: Rio Martino
- Basin countries: Italy
- Surface area: 0.9 km^{2} (0.35 sq mi)
- Surface elevation: 1 m (3 ft 3 in)

Ramsar Wetland
- Designated: 14 December 1976
- Reference no.: 128

Lago dei Monaci is a lake in the Province of Latina, Lazio, Italy. At an elevation of 1 m, its surface area is 0.9 km².
