= Matilde Celentano =

Italian politician

Mayor of Latina
- Incumbent
- Assumed office 17 May 2023
- Preceded by: Damiano Coletta

Personal details
- Born: 14 October 1959 (age 66) Carbonia, Italy
- Party: Brothers of Italy
- Height: 1.65 m (5 ft 5 in)
- Education: Sapienza University of Rome
- Occupation: Medic

Matilde Celentano (born 14 October 1959) is an Italian medic and politician.

A member of the far-right party Brothers of Italy, she serves as Mayor of Latina since 2023, the first woman to held the office.

Political offices
Preceded by Damiano Coletta	Mayor of Latina since 2023	Incumbent
