= List of mayors of Latina =

Mayor of Latina
- Sindaco di Latina
- Incumbent; Matilde Celentano (FdI) since 17 May 2023
- Appointer: Popular election
- Term length: 5 years, renewable once
- Formation: 1932
- Website: Official website

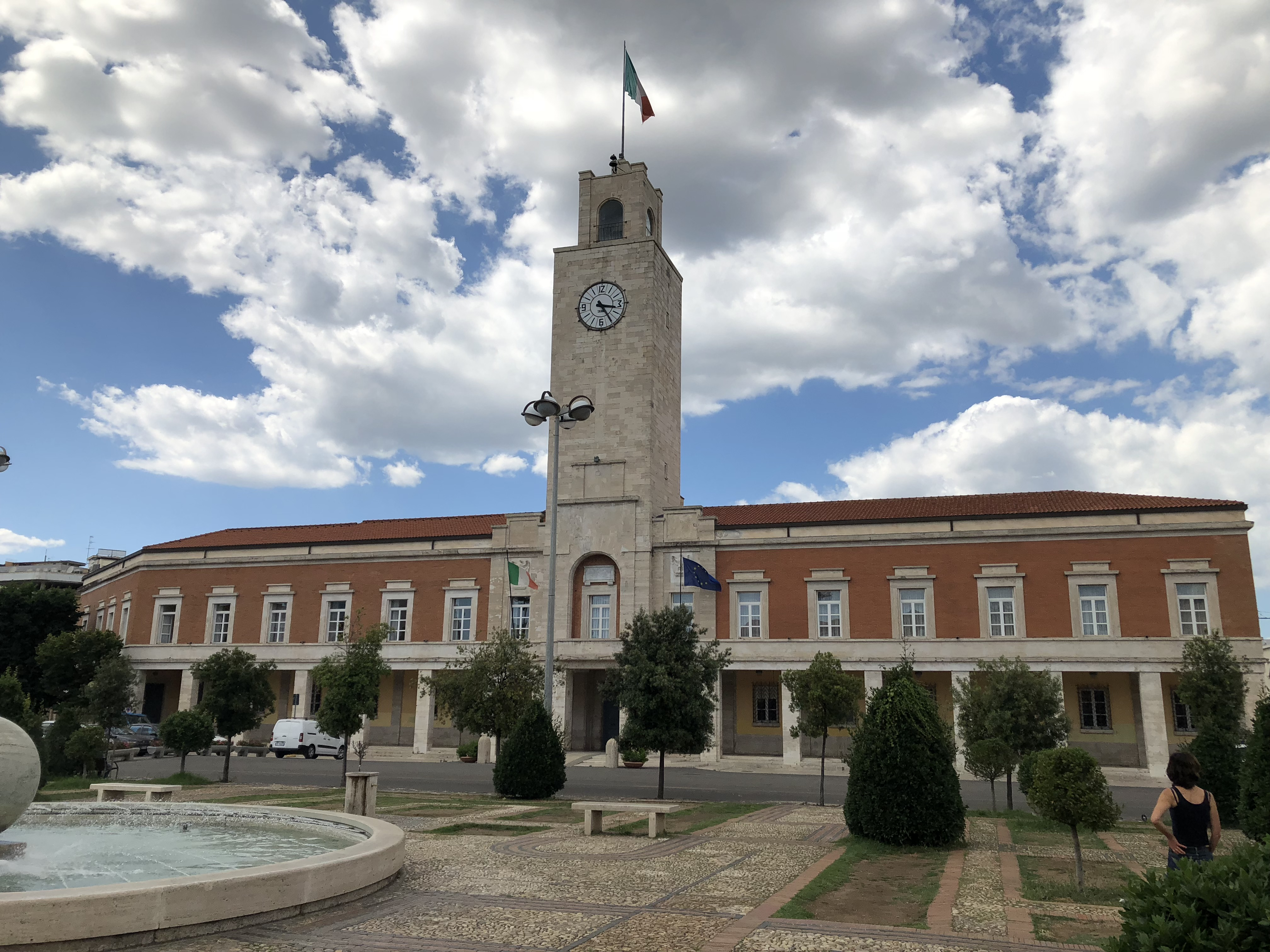
The seat of the Mayor of Latina.

The Mayor of Latina is an elected politician who, along with the Latina's City Council, is accountable for the strategic government of Latina in Lazio, Italy.

== Overview ==
According to the Italian Constitution, the Mayor of Latina is member of the City Council.

The Mayor is elected by the population of Latina, who also elects the members of the City Council, controlling the Mayor's policy guidelines and is able to enforce his resignation by a motion of no confidence. The Mayor is entitled to appoint and release the members of his government.

Since 1993 the Mayor is elected directly by Latina's electorate: in all mayoral elections in Italy in cities with a population higher than 15,000 the voters express a direct choice for the mayor or an indirect choice voting for the party of the candidate's coalition. If no candidate receives at least 50% of votes, the top two candidates go to a second round after two weeks. The election of the City Council is based on a direct choice for the candidate with a preference vote: the candidate with the majority of the preferences is elected. The number of the seats for each party is determined proportionally.

== Kingdom of Italy (1861–1946) ==
The city of Littoria was founded by the fascist government in 1932 and was ruled by an authoritarian Podestà chosen by the National Fascist Party. The office of Mayor of Latina was created in 1944 during the Allied occupation.

	Mayor	Term start	Term end	Party
Fascist Podestà (1932–1944)
1	Valentino Orsolini Cencelli (1898-1971)	1932	1933	PNF
2	Aurelio Leone	1933	1935	PNF
3	Enrico Pasqualucci	1936	1939	PNF
4	Alfredo Scalfati	1939	1944	PNF
Allied occupation (1944–1945)
1	Cornelio Rosati	1944	1945	Pd'A

== Italian Republic (since 1946) ==
=== City Council election (1946-1993) ===
From 1946 to 1993, the Mayor of Latina was elected by the City's Council.

	Mayor	Term start	Term end	Party	Election
1	Fernando Bassoli (1907-1988)	1946	1951	PRI	1946
2	Vittorio Cervone (1917-1993)	1951	1953	DC	1951
3	Igino Salvezza (1914–2001)	1953	1956	DC	1951
3	Igino Salvezza (1914–2001)	1956	1960	DC	1956
3	Igino Salvezza (1914–2001)	1960	1962	DC	1960
4	Angelo Onorati (1912–2005)	1962	1964	DC	1960
5	Guido Bernardi (1923–1995)	1964	1967	DC	1964
6	Vincenzo Tasciotti (1898-1984)	1967	1970	DC	1964
6	Vincenzo Tasciotti (1898-1984)	1970	1972	DC	1970
7	Antonio Corona (1933-1994)	1972	1975	DC	1970
7	Antonio Corona (1933-1994)	1975	1980	DC	1975
8	Delio Redi (1939-2017)	1980	1983	DC	1980
(7)	Antonio Corona (1933-1994)	1983	12 May 1985	DC	1980
(8)	Delio Redi (1939-2017)	12 May 1985	14 June 1990	DC	1985
(8)	Delio Redi (1939-2017)	14 June 1990	11 January 1992	DC	1990
9	Mario Romagnoli (b. 1934)	11 January 1992	12 May 1993	DC	1990
10	Maurizio Mansutti (b. 1955)	12 May 1993	17 August 1993	DC	1990
–	Emilio De Luca	12 May 1993	6 December 1993	Special Commissioner	

=== Direct election (since 1993) ===
Since 1993, under provisions of new local administration law, the Mayor of Latina is chosen by direct election.

	Mayor	Term start	Term end	Party	Coalition	Election
11	Ajmone Finestra (1921–2012)	6 December 1993	17 November 1997	MSI	MSI	1993
11	Ajmone Finestra (1921–2012)	17 November 1997	29 May 2002	MSI	Pole for Freedoms (FI-AN-CCD-CDU)	1997
12	Vincenzo Zaccheo (b. 1947)	29 May 2002	10 June 2007	AN	House of Freedoms (FI-AN-CCD-CDU)	2002
12	Vincenzo Zaccheo (b. 1947)	10 June 2007	15 April 2010 (Note: Forced to resign after losing a motion of no confidence in the City Council.)	AN	House of Freedoms (FI-AN-UDC)	2007
–	Guido Nardone	15 April 2010	20 May 2011	Special commissioner		
13	Giovanni Di Giorgi (b. 1967)	20 May 2011	11 June 2015 (Note: Forced to resign after losing a motion of no confidence in the City Council.)	PdL; FdI	PdL • UDC	2011
–	Giacomo Barbato	11 June 2015	20 June 2016	Special commissioner		
14	Damiano Coletta (b. 1960)	20 June 2016	18 October 2021	IC	Centre-left independents (Note: Sustained by the political groups "Latina Common Good", "Latina Rebirths" and "Latina Common Good Youth".)	2016
14	Damiano Coletta (b. 1960)	18 October 2021	11 July 2022	IC	IC • PD • M5S (Note: Sustained also by the civic lists "For Latina 2032" and "It Concerns Latina".)	2021
–	Carmine Valente	11 July 2022	8 September 2022	Special Commissioner		
(14)	Damiano Coletta (b. 1960)	8 September 2022	29 September 2022 (Note: Forced to resign after losing a motion of no confidence in the City Council.)	IC	IC • PD • M5S (Note: Sustained also by the civic lists "For Latina 2032" and "It Concerns Latina".)	(2022) (Note: Re-vote after 2021 results were annulled in some districts.)
–	Carmine Valente	29 September 2022	17 May 2023	Special Commissioner		
15	Matilde Celentano (b. 1959)	17 May 2023	Incumbent	FdI	FdI • R • L • FI • UDC	2023
