= Norma, Lazio =

Norma
- Comune
- Comune di Norma
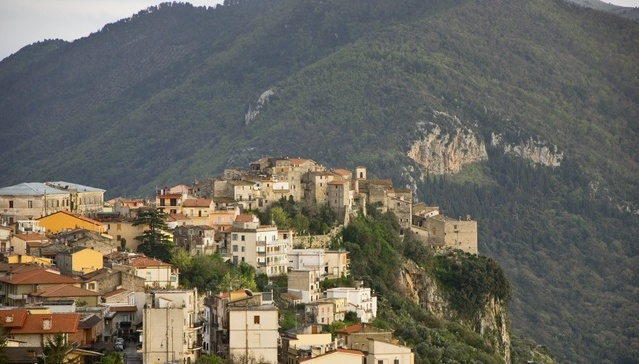
- View of Norma

- Coat of arms

- Location within Italy Location within Lazio
- Coordinates: 41°35′N 12°58′E
- Country: Italy
- Region: Lazio
- Province: Latina (LT)

Government
  - Mayor: Andrea Dell'Omo (Civic list)

Area
  - Total: 30 km^{2} (12 sq mi)
- Elevation: 410 m (1,350 ft)

Population (28 February 2017)
  - Total: 3,976
  - Density: 130/km^{2} (340/sq mi)
- Demonym: Normiciani or Normensi
- Time zone: UTC+1 (CET)
  - Summer (DST): UTC+2 (CEST)
- Postal code: 04010
- Dialing code: 0773
- Patron saint: Saint Barbara
- Saint day: 4 December
- Website: Official website

Norma is a comune (municipality) in the Province of Latina in the Italian region Lazio, located about 50 kilometres (31 mi) southeast of Rome and about 14 kilometres (9 mi) northeast of Latina in the Monti Lepini range.

Its territory houses the Gardens of Ninfa. A summer camp was once held there.

== History ==
Following Justinian I's invasion of Italy in 535, the area has become part of Byzantine-controlled Italy under the Exarch in Ravenna. In 743, it was given to Papal control and later became part of the Papal States.
