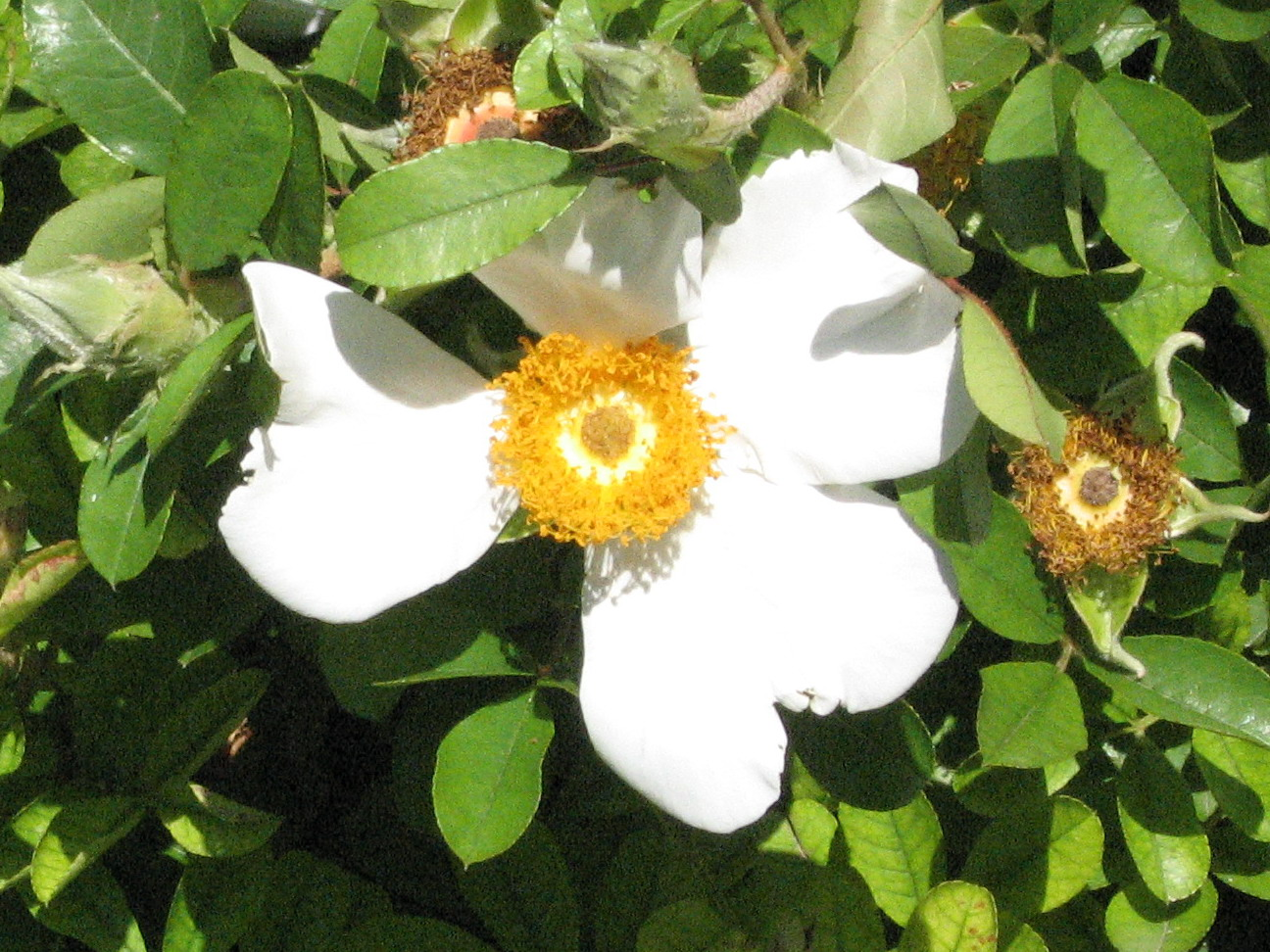

Scientific classification
- Kingdom: Plantae
- Clade: Tracheophytes
- Clade: Angiosperms
- Clade: Eudicots
- Clade: Rosids
- Order: Rosales
- Family: Rosaceae
- Genus: Rosa
- Species: R. bracteata

Binomial name
- Rosa bracteata J.C. Wendl.

Synonyms
- List: Ernestella bracteata (H.L.Wendl.) Germ.; Rosa bracteata var. taiwanensis S.S.Ying; Rosa lucida Lawrance; Rosa macartnea Dum.Cours.

= Rosa bracteata =

Species of plant

Rosa bracteata, commonly known as the Macartney rose, is a species of rose native to southern China and Taiwan that has become invasive in parts of the United States following its introduction as an ornamental plant. It is the only wild species in the section Bracteatae of the genus Rosa. In 2026, a chromosome-scale genome assembly of Rosa bracteata was published, providing a genomic resource for rose evolution and breeding studies.

== Etymology ==
Rosa bracteata – bracteata referring to the notable bracts below the flowers – is commonly referred to as the Macartney rose. Its name links back to a German botanist, Johann Christoph Wendland, who is credited with naming the species. The name Macartney rose originates from the mid 18th century, when it was named after George Macartney, the 1st Earl Macartney in England. According to the Global Invasive Species Database, this rose is also referred to by other names – though less commonly – such as the Chickasaw rose and the fragrant white climbing rose, both of English origin, and shuo bao qiang wei, which is of Chinese origin.

== Description ==
The Macartney rose is native to southern China and Taiwan, but is now considered to be an invasive species across many states in the United States ever since its introduction as an ornamental plant.

== Distribution and habitat ==
Rosa bracteata is a highly adaptable plant and can grow in highly disturbed areas. It can be found in areas ranging from pastures, rangeland, drainage ditches, and along roadsides and fence lines. R. bracteata tends to prefer dark, waterlogged, and clay-based soil compositions. This species was introduced into the United States from Asia, and is only found within the lower 48 states, mostly in the southeastern United States. Some of the states it can be found in include Texas, Louisiana, Arkansas, Mississippi, Alabama, Georgia, Florida, South Carolina, North Carolina, Tennessee, Kentucky, Virginia, and Maryland.

Its method of dispersal is through animals, where it is spread by livestock, birds, and other herbivorous organisms. The rose's fruit gets eaten by these animals, which acts as a germination technique after going through the digestive tract of the foraging animal.

== Morphology and ecology ==
Rosa bracteata is a perennial evergreen shrub that often forms dense clumps. This species of rose can grow up to 10 feet (3.0 m) in height and width.

=== Leaves and stem ===
Rosa bracteata has recurved thorns which are modified leaves all along its stem. Its leaves are serrated and placed in an alternate pattern and range between 1 and 3 inches (2.5 and 7.6 cm) in length; they are pinnately compound with 5 to 9 thick leaflets per leaf. The tops of the leaves can be described as glossy or shiny as compared to the bottoms of the leaves which are a muted green.

=== Flowers, fruit and seeds ===
The flowers of this rose occur in either single or bunched compositions, usually donning five-petaled white flowers of 1–3 in number on bunches of short stalks. These flowers can typically be seen from April to June which are a part of the spring and summer months in the Northern Hemisphere. Its hips are spherical in shape and are usually a reddish color when ripe. These can be seen from July to December. Its seeds are generally dormant when first created but germinate in temperatures around 41 °F (5 °C); its optimal temperatures for growth fall between 68 and 86 °F (20 and 30 °C).

== Genomics ==
In 2026, a chromosome-scale genome assembly of Rosa bracteata was published using long-read sequencing and Hi-C scaffolding technologies. The genome assembly is approximately 540 Mb in length and organized into seven pseudochromosomes, consistent with the species’ diploid chromosome number (2n = 14). The study predicted 42,789 protein-coding genes and reported high assembly completeness.

== Invasive species ==
Rosa bracteata has been a major concern as an invasive species for those raising livestock. Infestations of Rosa bracteata tend to clump together and create thickets that can be up to three meters high which cause issues for movement of livestock and its quick proliferation saps nutrients from surrounding species, stunting their growth. When mechanical means of disruption are used, such as mowing, the plant is able to regrow from a shallow root which means that it is very difficult to actually remove the species when it has entered a novel ecosystem. Fire is similarly ineffective because of this regenerative ability which means extensive research has been done into the usage of herbicides to treat this particular species.

=== Herbicide applications ===
According to a study done in 2013, the effectiveness of herbicide applications on Rosa bracteata tend to vary by the timing they are introduced to the organism, for example: all three herbicide treatments of 2,4-D/aminopyralid, aminopyralid/metsulfuron, and picloram/2,4-D all had very effective reduction when treated at the month of October and very poor reduction when applied during May. In general, there is no singular herbicide or method of mechanical disruption that can effectively deal with Rosa bracteata; efficient pest control employs a multitude of these tools in tandem.

== Usage ==
Rosa bracteata was once used in Texas as a "living fence" for livestock grazing, although it was originally introduced from Asia as an ornamental plant. It has also had a history of being used for erosion control and has been used for cross-breeding rose cultivars.

It is thought that Rosa bracteata had been used alongside other rose species including R. brunonii, R. foetida, and R. eglanteria for its medicinal properties in ancient India by infusing it with water and oils, and by making teas. In Ayurvedic medicine, different rose species (including R. bracteata) were commonly used to cure spiritual ailments like a blockage in the chakras as well as for remedies for fever and acid reflux. Roses were also worn in ceremonies, made into perfumes, and were an integral part of everyday life in India among both the elite classes and non-elite ones.

== History ==
This rose species is thought to originate from the Indian subcontinent in the Himalayas, an area rich with mythology, lore and spiritualism. Mentions of Rosa bracteata, or sometimes referred to by other names such as "sivapriya", can be found in scriptures dating back to the 1st century BC. Gautama the Buddha who is usually depicted meditating on a pedestal of lotuses, can be seen in a few depictions meditating on a pedestal of a five petalled rose resembling Rosa bracteata. Over time, the rose has been mentioned in Chinese history which was facilitated by trade between these regions.
