= Vincenzo Zaccheo =

Italian politician (born 1947)

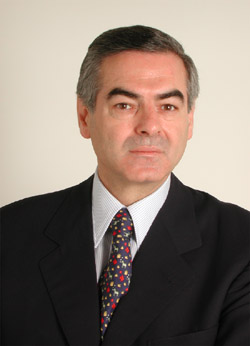
- Born: Vincenzo Zaccheo; 10 May 1947 (age 79); Latina (Italy)
- Occupation: politician
- Height: 1.77 m (5 ft 10 in)

Vincenzo Zaccheo (born 10 May 1947) was an Italian politician who served as Deputy (1994–2006) and Mayor of Latina (2002–2010).
