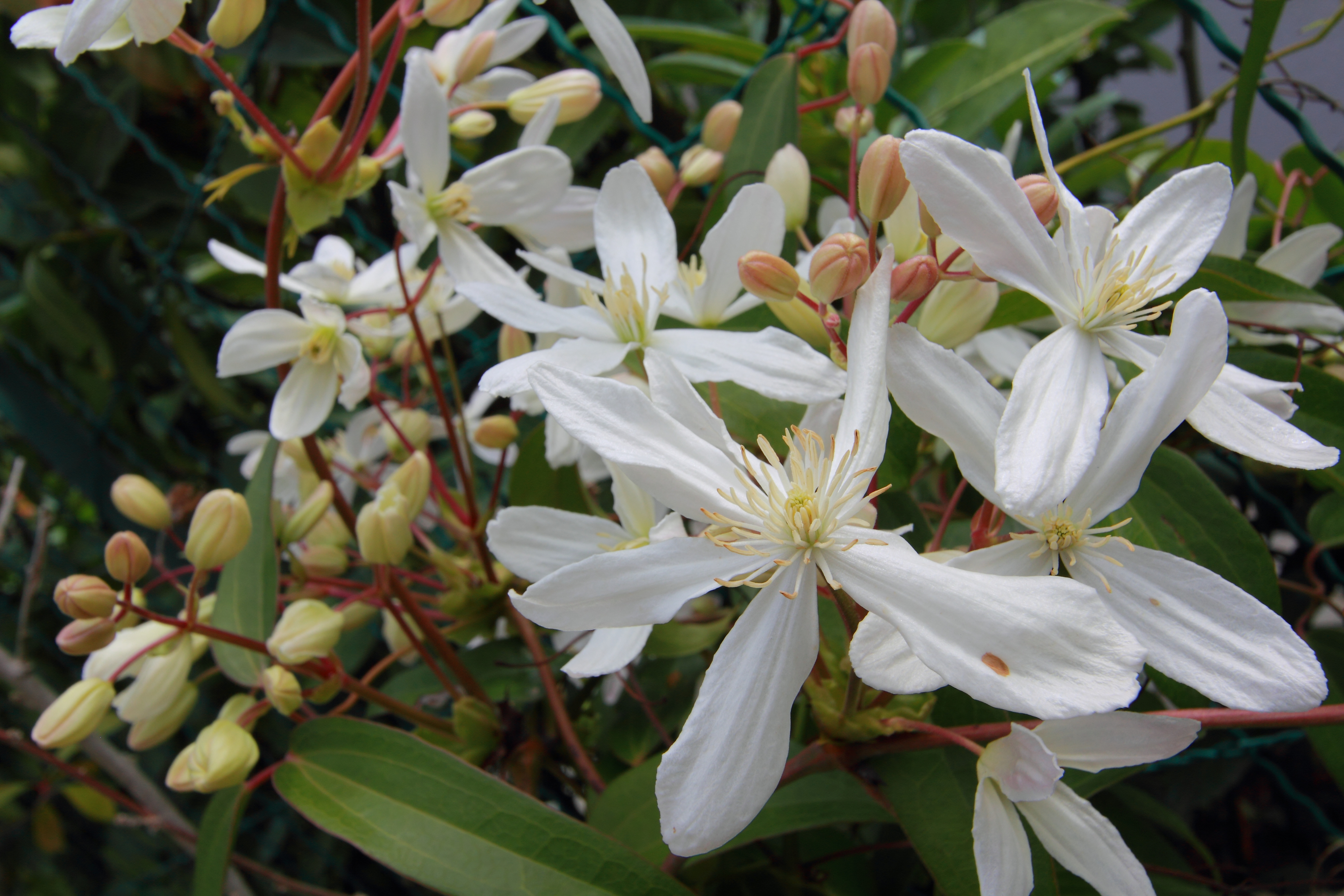
- Clematis armandii flowers and floral buds.

Scientific classification
- Kingdom: Plantae
- Clade: Tracheophytes
- Clade: Angiosperms
- Clade: Eudicots
- Order: Ranunculales
- Family: Ranunculaceae
- Genus: Clematis
- Species: C. armandii

Binomial name
- Clematis armandii Franch.

= Clematis armandii =

Armand clematis

Species of flowering plant in the buttercup family

Clematis armandii (also called Armand clematis or evergreen clematis) is a flowering climbing plant of the genus Clematis. Like many members of that genus, it is prized by gardeners for its showy flowers. It is native to much of China (except the north and extreme south) and northern Burma. The plant is a woody perennial. It attracts bees, butterflies, and hummingbirds.

== In cultivation ==
C. armandii bears fragrant 2.5-inch white flowers in spring on the previous year's growth. Its dark green leaves droop to create a textured look, and it serves well as a screen. It may grow to a height of 20 feet. Its leaf tips may burn badly if grown in salty soil or water. In the USA it grows best in American Horticultural Society zones 9 to 7, which are generally found in the southern USA.

Cultivars include the pink-flowered 'Hendersonii Rubra' as well as 'Apple Blossom' and 'Snowdrift'. 'Apple Blossom' is a recipient of the Royal Horticultural Society's Award of Garden Merit.

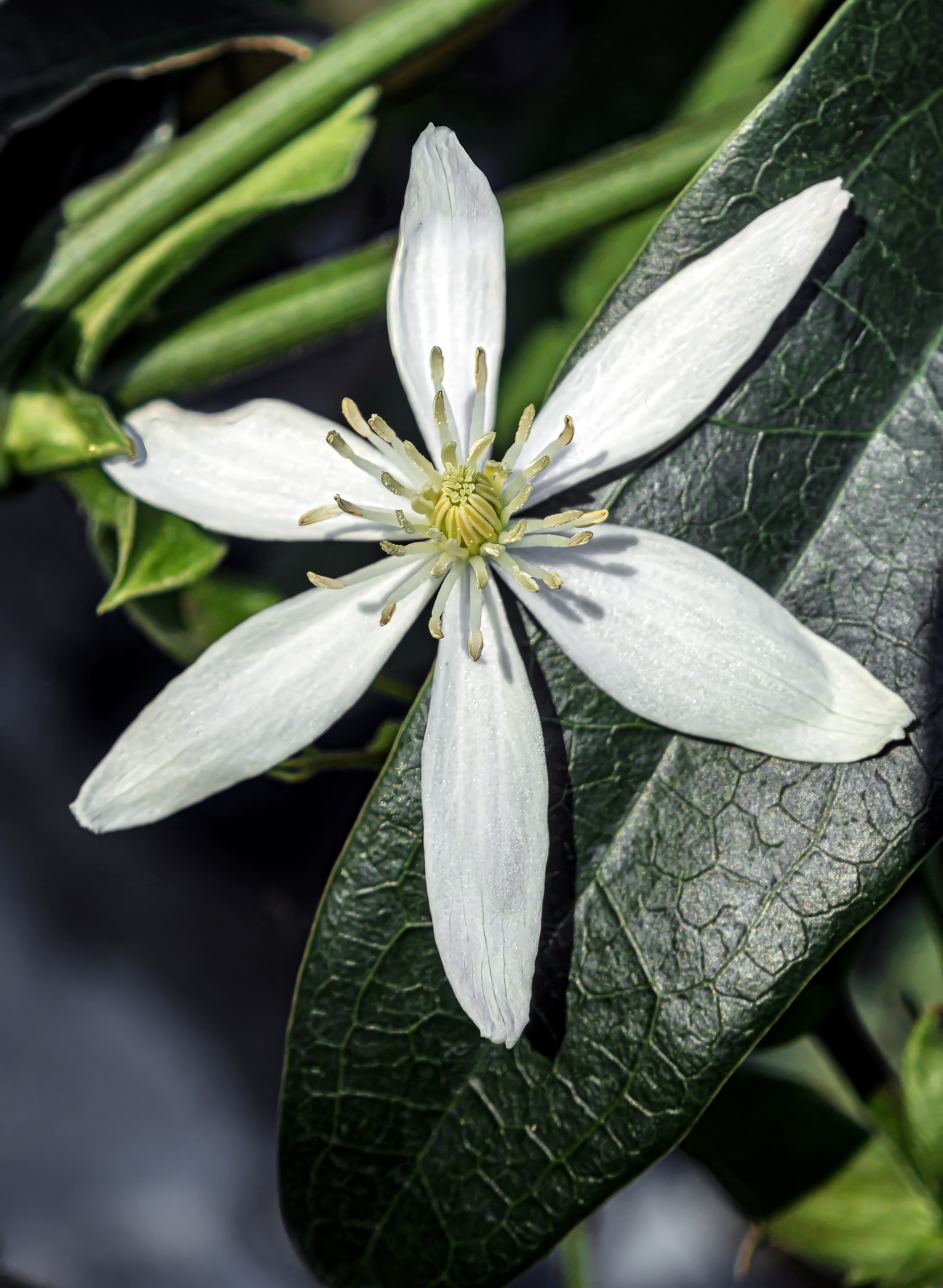
Clematis armandii - flower.

== Etymology ==
'Clematis' is the Greek name for several climbing plants, and is a diminutive of 'klema' means 'vine shoot'.

Named for Father Armand David (1826-1900), a Lazarist missionary and plant collector in China.
