= Monte Petrella =

Mountain in Italy

- Location within Italy

Highest point
- Elevation: 1,533 m (5,030 ft)
- Prominence: 1,370 m (4,490 ft)
- Listing: Ribu
- Coordinates: 41°19′22″N 13°39′55″E

Geography
- Location: Lazio, Italy
- Parent range: Aurunci Mountains

Monte Petrella is the highest peak in the Aurunci Mountains, in southern Lazio, central Italy. It has an elevation of 1,533 metres (5,030 ft).

It can be reached from Spigno Saturnia from east, and Maranola, a frazione of Formia, from west.
