= Province of Latina =

Coordinates: 41°28′3.35″N 12°54′13.32″E

Province of Latina Provincia di Latina (Italian)
- Province
- Flag Coat of arms

- Location of the Province of Latina in Italy
- Country: Italy
- Region: Lazio
- Capital(s): Latina
- Municipalities: 33

Government
  - President: Federico Carnevale (FI)

Area
  - Total: 2,256.16 km^{2} (871.11 sq mi)

Population (2026)
  - Total: 567,130
  - Density: 251.37/km^{2} (651.04/sq mi)

GDP
  - Total: €12.524 billion (2015)
  - Per capita: €21,844 (2015)
- Time zone: UTC+1 (CET)
  - Summer (DST): UTC+2 (CEST)
- Postal code: 04100
- Telephone prefix: 0773, 06, 0771
- Vehicle registration: LT
- ISTAT code: 059
- Website: Official website

The Province of Latina (Italian: Provincia di Latina) is a province in the region of Lazio in Italy. Its provincial capital is the city of Latina. It is bordered by the provinces of Frosinone to the northeast and by the Metropolitan City of Rome Capital to the northwest.

It has a population of 567,130 in an area of 2,256.16 square kilometres (871.11 mi^{2}) across its 33 municipalities.

== History ==
The province of Latina was founded on 18 December 1934, encompassing mainly the drained areas of the Agro Pontino previously part of the province of Rome. Apart from the Pontine lands, it includes the Aurunci, Lepini and Ausoni mountain ranges, as well as the Pontine Islands archipelago. The port of Gaeta and Formia, in the southernmost part of the province, belonged traditionally and linguistically to Campania.

In Bronze Age, complex permanent settlement systems and functionally differentiated societies developed in the Pontine region. This included preparation of fish and salt at the coast and metallurgy slightly inland. Late Iron Age fortified settlements evolved on the Alban Hills and Monti Lepini. Small-scale farming and urbanisation developed only in or right before the Roman Age with transhumant pastoralism still continuing. From 350 BC onwards, the colonies of Cora (Cori), Norba and Setia (Sezze) were built. The small peasant economy was gradually replaced by large specialised latifundia.

== Geography ==
Although the smallest of the provinces in the Lazio region, the province of Latina includes a variety of geographical and historical areas.

=== Hill and mountain areas ===
The mainland area is, in the south- and north-eastern part, mostly occupied by limestone hills and mountains. Ranges include the Lepini, Aurunci, Ausoni. The highest elevation is that of 1,533-metre (5,030 ft) Monte Petrella (Aurunci). The climate is semi-continental with hot summers and cold winters; temperatures rarely fall below 0 °C (32 °F).

The mountains are characterized by small medieval settlements (borghi). The people traditionally lived by cattle raising and agriculture; however, these activities have markedly declined in the 21st century. Today, workers usually commute daily to jobs in Rome or Latina.

Tourism is an increasing part of the economy, with people attracted especially by the uncontaminated natural environment and by artistic traces of the Middle Ages (Abbeys of Valvisciolo and Fossanova, where St. Thomas Aquinas died). The main centres of this area are Cori, Sezze, and Priverno.

=== Agro Pontino ===
The Agro Pontino occupies the plain extending southwards from Aprilia to Terracina, along the Tyrrhenian Sea. Until the 1930s, it was covered by marshes, considered to be unhealthy.

These were drained and land reclaimed under the Fascist government. Agriculture was expanded, and new towns built by and for workers coming from north-eastern Italy. These included Sabaudia and Latina.

The sole mountain peak is that of Circeo promontory. The climate is mild. The Agro Pontino is the most economically developed part of the province, housing a flourishing agricultural sector and numerous service firms and industries. It also houses much of the water basins of the province, such as the coast Lakes of Fogliano, Caprolace, and Paola.

Apart from the capital, the main cities include Cisterna di Latina, Terracina, and Sabaudia.

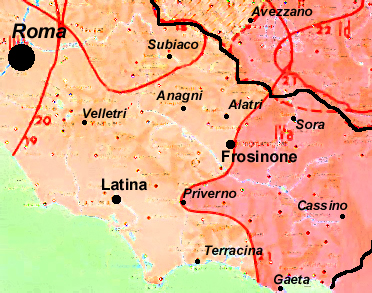
Linguistic map of Southern Lazio: Central Italian in pink and Southern Italian (Neapolitan language) in magenta

=== Formia and Gaeta ===
Cities rich of ancient and medieval history, Gaeta and Formia were traditionally part of the Kingdom of Naples. They belonged to the Campania region until 1934. Traces of the different cultural milieu can be identified in the costumes and, most of all, in the local dialect, a variant of Neapolitan. Formia and Gaeta constitutes a single metropolitan area with an important port (with connection to the Pontine Islands), a station on the main railway line Rome-Naples. Other important centres include Sperlonga and Minturno.

=== Pontine Islands ===
Once mainly used as penitentiaries, the Pontine Islands are now a renowned tourist resort in summer. The only inhabited islands are Ponza and Ventotene.

=== Municipalities ===
The province has 33 municipalities:

- Aprilia
- Bassiano
- Campodimele
- Castelforte
- Cisterna di Latina
- Cori
- Fondi
- Formia
- Gaeta
- Itri
- Latina
- Lenola
- Maenza
- Minturno
- Monte San Biagio
- Norma
- Pontinia
- Ponza
- Priverno
- Prossedi
- Rocca Massima
- Roccagorga
- Roccasecca dei Volsci
- Sabaudia
- San Felice Circeo
- Santi Cosma e Damiano
- Sermoneta
- Sezze
- Sonnino
- Sperlonga
- Spigno Saturnia
- Terracina
- Ventotene

== Demographics ==
As of 2026, the population is 567,130, of which 49.8% are male, and 50.2% are female. Minors make up 15.0% of the population, and seniors make up 23.7%.

Historical population

Year	Pop.	±%
1861	64,518	—
1871	119,782	+85.7%
1881	119,705	−0.1%
1901	142,146	+18.7%
1911	154,788	+8.9%
1921	163,705	+5.8%
1931	188,570	+15.2%
1936	237,333	+25.9%

Year	Pop.	±%
1951	283,699	+19.5%
1961	319,056	+12.5%
1971	376,238	+17.9%
1981	434,086	+15.4%
1991	476,282	+9.7%
2001	491,230	+3.1%
2011	544,732	+10.9%
2021	567,439	+4.2%

Source: ISTAT

=== Immigration ===
As of 2025, immigrants make up 11.7% of the population. The 5 largest foreign countries of birth are Romania, India, Bangladesh, Albania, and Ukraine.

== See also ==
- Roman Catholic Archdiocese of Gaeta#Province of Latina
- Lake Fogliano
