= Ponza (municipality) =

- Comune
- Comune di Ponza
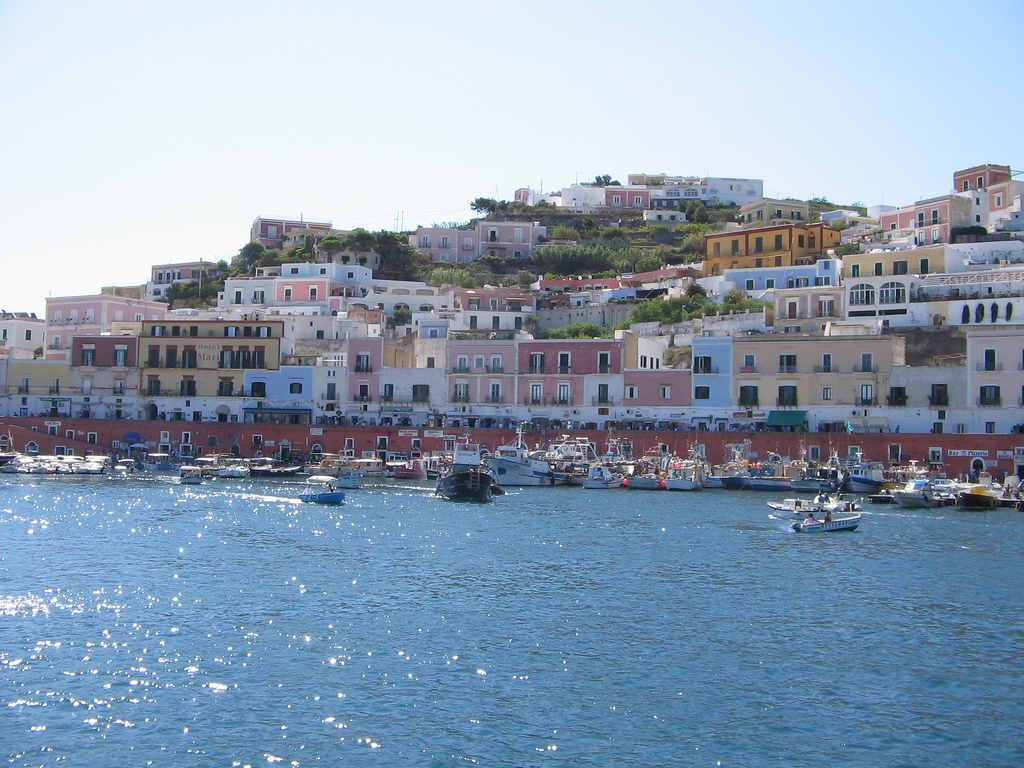
- The port of Ponza

- Coat of arms

- Location within Italy Location within Lazio
- Coordinates: 40°54′N 12°58′E
- Country: Italy
- Region: Lazio
- Province: Latina (LT)
- Frazioni: Campo Inglese, Giancos, Guarini, I Conti, Le Forna, Santa Maria

Government
  - Mayor: Francesco Ambrosino (Civic list)

Area
  - Total: 10.16 km^{2} (3.92 sq mi)
- Elevation: 10 m (33 ft)

Population (2026)
  - Total: 3,295
  - Density: 324.3/km^{2} (840.0/sq mi)
- Demonym: Ponzesi
- Time zone: UTC+1 (CET)
  - Summer (DST): UTC+2 (CEST)
- Postal code: 04027
- Dialing code: 0771
- ISTAT code: 059018
- Patron saint: St. Silverius
- Saint day: June 20
- Website: Official website

Ponza is a comune (municipality) of the Province of Latina in the region of Lazio in Italy. It comprises the four islands of the western part of the Pontine archipelago in the Gulf of Gaeta (central Tyrrhenian Sea): Ponza itself, Palmarola, Zannone, and Gavi. It has 3,295 inhabitants.

The economy of Ponza is essentially based on fishing and summer tourism.

== Ponza ==
The main centre of the island is the port of Ponza, which stands towards the southern end of the eastern coast and is the seat of the commune. Other settlements include Guarini, Giancos, I Conti and Santa Maria in the centre of the island and Campo Inglese and Le Forna in the north.

== Palmarola ==
The second largest of the islands is Palmarola which lies some 10 kilometres (6 mi) to the west of Ponza. It is inhabited only in the summer months and is the site of a nature reserve. The church of San Silverio recalls Pope Silverius’ death while in exile on the island.

== Zannone ==
The island of Zannone is some 10 kilometres (6 mi) to the north-east of Ponza and is completely uninhabited: even overnight stays are prohibited. This forms part of the Circeo National Park.

== Gavi ==
The tiny island of Gavi lies only 120 metres (390 ft) off the northeastern tip of Ponza.

== Demographics ==
As of 2026, the population is 3,295, of which 52.3% are male, and 47.7% are female. Minors make up 13.2% of the population, and seniors make up 27.9%.

Historical population

Year	Pop.	±%
1861	3,197	—
1871	3,115	−2.6%
1881	3,779	+21.3%
1901	4,621	+22.3%
1911	4,901	+6.1%
1921	6,261	+27.7%
1931	6,827	+9.0%
1936	6,457	−5.4%

Year	Pop.	±%
1951	4,832	−25.2%
1961	4,664	−3.5%
1971	3,782	−18.9%
1981	3,210	−15.1%
1991	3,315	+3.3%
2001	3,110	−6.2%
2011	3,255	+4.7%
2021	3,305	+1.5%

Source: ISTAT

=== Immigration ===
As of 2025, immigrants make up 10.8% of the population. The 5 largest foreign countries of birth are Romania, the United States, Tunisia, Ukraine, and Georgia.

== Twin towns - sister cities ==
- Aglientu, Italy
- Ischia, Italy, since 2013
