= Casati Stampa murders =

1970 murder–suicide in Italy

Camillo II Casati Stampa di Soncino
- Marquis Casati Stampa and his wife Anna Fallarino, with the wife's lover Massimo Minorenti (inset)
- Born: 1927; Milan, Italy
- Died: 1970 (aged 42–43)
- Cause of death: Suicide
- Known for: Murder of wife & wife's lover
- Title: Marquis
- Children: Marquise Annamaria Casati Stampa

Details
- Victims: Anna Fallarino; Massimo Minorenti
- Date: 1970
- Weapons: Browning 12-gauge machine gun

The Casati Stampa murders refer to the 1970 murders, in Rome, Italy, committed by Camillo II Casati Stampa di Soncino, Marquis of Casate, of his wife Anna Fallarino and her lover Massimo Minorenti, followed by the suicide of the murderer, a crime that, at the time, "shocked Italy."

== Background ==
Casati Stampa, born in 1927, was descendant of one of the oldest Milanese families of Italian nobility, which had risen to prominence since the 15th century. His father was for a time married to heiress and patroness of the arts Luisa Adele Rosa Maria Amman. Stampa married young actress Letizia Izzo and they had a daughter, the marquise Annamaria.

Anna Fallarino, born in 1929, grew up in Amorosi of the Benevento province in Campania. At the age of 12, as her niece Mariateresa Fiumanò later revealed in a book, Fallarino was sexually abused by the local-parish priest. Fallarino tried for a career in cinema, making only a short appearance in the comedy Totò Tarzan. She married engineer Giuseppe "Peppino" Drommi and they had no children. (Note: Drommi, in 1971, at the time consul of Panama, remarried socialite countess Patrizia de Blanck y Menocal and in 1981 they had a daughter, Giada.)

In 1955, Stampa and Fallarino first met, by some accounts in Cannes, or by others at an event at the Palazzo Barberini, in Rome. They became lovers and, after succeeding in the annulment of their respective marriages by the Tribunale della Rota Romana (the Apostolic Tribunal of the Roman Rota), the highest appellate tribunal of the Catholic Church, they got married in a civil ceremony in 1959, and, in 1961, in a religious one.

From the early days of their marriage, Casati Stampa was inviting men to have sex with his wife while he was watching and often taking pictures, while he also kept a diary of these events. The couple, during summertime, were mostly staying in the "rugged" island of Zannone, located off the coast between Rome and Naples, in a villa situated on the summit of the island, in which they were throwing nightly "wild parties" that lasted until morning, involving "heavy drinking" and group sex.

== The crime ==
Among the men who were sexual partners of Casati Stampa's wife was Massimo Minorenti, a young Italian previously involved in far-right circles (Note: Anna Casati Stampa's name appeared in a 1968 letter of recommendation supplied to Mario Moretti when he applied for a job at Sit Siemens, where he was eventually hired. Moretti presented himself to the marquise's wife as a young man with far-right political convictions, while he was actually a leading figure in the Red Brigades. See Lucarelli, Valerio (2013). "Mario Moretti: spia o puro rivoluzionario?" [Mario Moretti: Secret agent or true revolutionary?]. from Buio Rivoluzione (Dark Revolution) (in Italian).) who, after briefly appearing in porn films, worked as an escort of "older rich women." Fallarino started seeing Minorenti without her husband being present, and Casati Stampa, learning of this, became jealous.

On Saturday 29 August 1970, the marquis, invited for a weekend of hunting by the Marzotto family, stays at their estate in Valdagno of Vicenza. In the evening, he calls his wife, who informs him she'll spend the evening with "some friends," including Minorenti, who would need from him a loan, she says, to open a car dealership in the city. In the early hours of Sunday 30 August, Casati Stampa goes out to the hunting fields and kills nearly two hundred ducks. He leaves and drives back to Rome, whereby he storms in a "distraught" condition their home on Via Puccini 9 (Note: The Casati Stampa home at via Puccini is a two-story penthouse, overlooking Villa Borghese and the pine forest that extends from Porta Pinciana to Valle Giulia. See Baresani (2022).) and asks servants not to disturb him. He enters the living room where his wife and Minorenti were sitting waiting for him and fires three shots with his 12-gauge Browning at Fallarino who is killed instantly and then two shots at Minorenti who tries in vain to protect himself behind a small table. He then turns the weapon on his head and fires. The servants, upon hearing the shots, call the police.

== Aftermath ==
The marquis' will had bequeathed everything to his wife. Following their deaths, a legal battle began between the two respective families for the inheritance. The autopsy having determined that Fallarino had expired before her husband, the fortune of Camillo II Casati Stampa of more than 2.4 billion lire (at the time worth about $3.9mln and in 2020 about $26mln) was awarded to his heir, daughter Annamaria, from his wedding to Letizia Izzo. Annamaria had married at eighteen Count Pierdonato Donà delle Rose and moved with him to Brazil. Among the fortune's assets was the Villa San Martino, in Lombardy's Arcore, which she sold in 1972 to Silvio Berlusconi, then a real-estate businessman. (Note: The villa in Arcore would subsequently feature prominently in the trials and allegations involving Silvio Berlusconi.)

A portion of the hundreds of photographs taken by Casati Stampa of his wife in various "compromising" settings found their way into newspapers and magazines some time after the crime.

In 2019, Salvatore Pagano, the villa's keeper, died from natural causes, having never revealed anything about the household's affairs.

Fifty years after the event, in 2020, author Maria Pia Selvaggio published Il delitto di via Puccini (The crime of Puccini street), offering a "fictionalized" account of the crime. The same year, director Umberto Rinaldi announced the production of a film based on the book, but the project did not materialize. Also in 2020, L'affaire Casati Stampa was published, in which its author Davide Amante claimed that "truly, there was a great love story behind [the crime] but of a non-conformist love." Organizers of tours to crime scenes in Rome started including visits to the address where the murders were committed.

On Zannone island, by the 2020s, no buildings remain except for a lighthouse and the deserted villa's remains. The island is the habitat of mouflon wild sheep, now a protected species.

== See also ==
- Candaulism – Paraphilia
- Compersion
- Murder–suicide – Committing murder and suicide
- Sexual jealousy – Psychological concept
- Uxoricide – Act of killing one's wife or girlfriend
- Voyeurism – Sexual interest in or practice of spying on people engaged in intimate behaviors
