= Santo Stefano lizard =

Conservation status
- Extinct (1965)

Scientific classification
- Domain: Eukaryota
- Kingdom: Animalia
- Phylum: Chordata
- Class: Reptilia
- Order: Squamata
- Family: Lacertidae
- Genus: Podarcis
- Species: P. siculus
- Subspecies: †P. s. sanctistephani

Trinomial name
- †Podarcis siculus sanctistephani (Mertens, 1926)

Synonyms
- Lacerta sicula sancti-stephani Mertens, 1926

Extinct subspecies of lizard

The Santo Stefano lizard (Podarcis siculus sanctistephani) lived on Santo Stefano Island, a small island near Ventotene in the Tyrrhenian Sea off the west coast of Italy, and part of the Pontine Islands. It became extinct in 1965, probably caused by feral cats and a snake species. These animals destroyed almost the whole population and any survivors seem to have interbred with an introduced subspecies. An epidemic of an unknown pathogen that followed wiped out the majority of the population and contributed to this subspecies' extinction.

== See also ==
- List of extinct animals of Europe
