= Alvania claudioi =

Scientific classification
- Kingdom: Animalia
- Phylum: Mollusca
- Class: Gastropoda
- Subclass: Caenogastropoda
- Order: Littorinimorpha
- Superfamily: Rissooidea
- Family: Rissoidae
- Genus: Alvania
- Species: A. claudioi

Binomial name
- Alvania claudioi Buzzurro & Landini, 2007

Species of mollusc

Alvania claudioi is a species of minute sea snail, a marine gastropod mollusc or micromollusc in the family Rissoidae.

== Description ==
The length of the shell attains 2.63 mm, its diameter 1.46 mm.

== Distribution ==
This species occurs in the Tyrrhenian Sea off the island Ventotene, Italy.
