= Roma Bene =

- Spanish film poster
- Directed by: Carlo Lizzani
- Written by: Nicola Badalucco; Edith Bieber; Carlo Lizzani
- Produced by: Nino Crisman
- Starring: Nino Manfredi; Virna Lisi; Senta Berger; Michèle Mercier; Irene Papas
- Cinematography: Giuseppe Ruzzolini
- Music by: Luis Enriquez Bacalov
- Distributed by: Compagnia Edizioni Internazionali
- Release date: October 8, 1971
- Running time: 100 minutes
- Country: Italy
- Language: Italian

Roma Bene is a 1971 Italian comedy-drama film directed by Carlo Lizzani and starring Virna Lisi, Nino Manfredi, Irene Papas and Senta Berger.

== Plot ==
The classic scene of the upper middle-class in Rome: a duchess, the industrial husband and the many apparently respectable characters. It is actually a parade of dingy types: the Baron is a jewel thief, among the others there are social climbers, unscrupulous nobles who staged fake kidnappings and extortion attempts, and even a wife who comes to commission the murder of the ship-owner husband. The fate of these people will be the same: death at sea, but their misdeeds instead will remain unaddressed and an overzealous police commissioner will be promoted and transferred.

== Cast ==
- Nino Manfredi as Police Commissioner Quintilio Tartamella
- Philippe Leroy as Giorgio Santi
- Virna Lisi as Duchess Silvia Santi
- Mario Feliciani as Teo Teopulos
- Irene Papas as Elena Teopulos
- Evi Maltagliati as Elena's mother
- Umberto Orsini as Prince Rubio Marescalli
- Senta Berger as Princess Dedé Marescalli
- Franco Fabrizi as Nino Rappi
- Michèle Mercier as Wilma Rappi
- Vittorio Caprioli as Baron Maurizio De Vittis
- Gastone Moschin as Monsignore
- Vittorio Sanipoli as the Chief of Police
- Annabella Incontrera as the lesbian lover
- Enzo Cannavale as Agent Tognon
- Peter Baldwin as Michele Vismara
- George Wang as Che-Fang
- Gigi Ballista as Vitozzi
- Minnie Minoprio as Minnie
- Ely Galleani as Vivi Santi

== Production ==
Lizzani got the inspiration for the film from the Casati Stampa murders. Principal cinematography started in Rome on March 1971.

== Reception ==
The film was a major success, grossing about 1,8 billion lire at the Italian box office.
