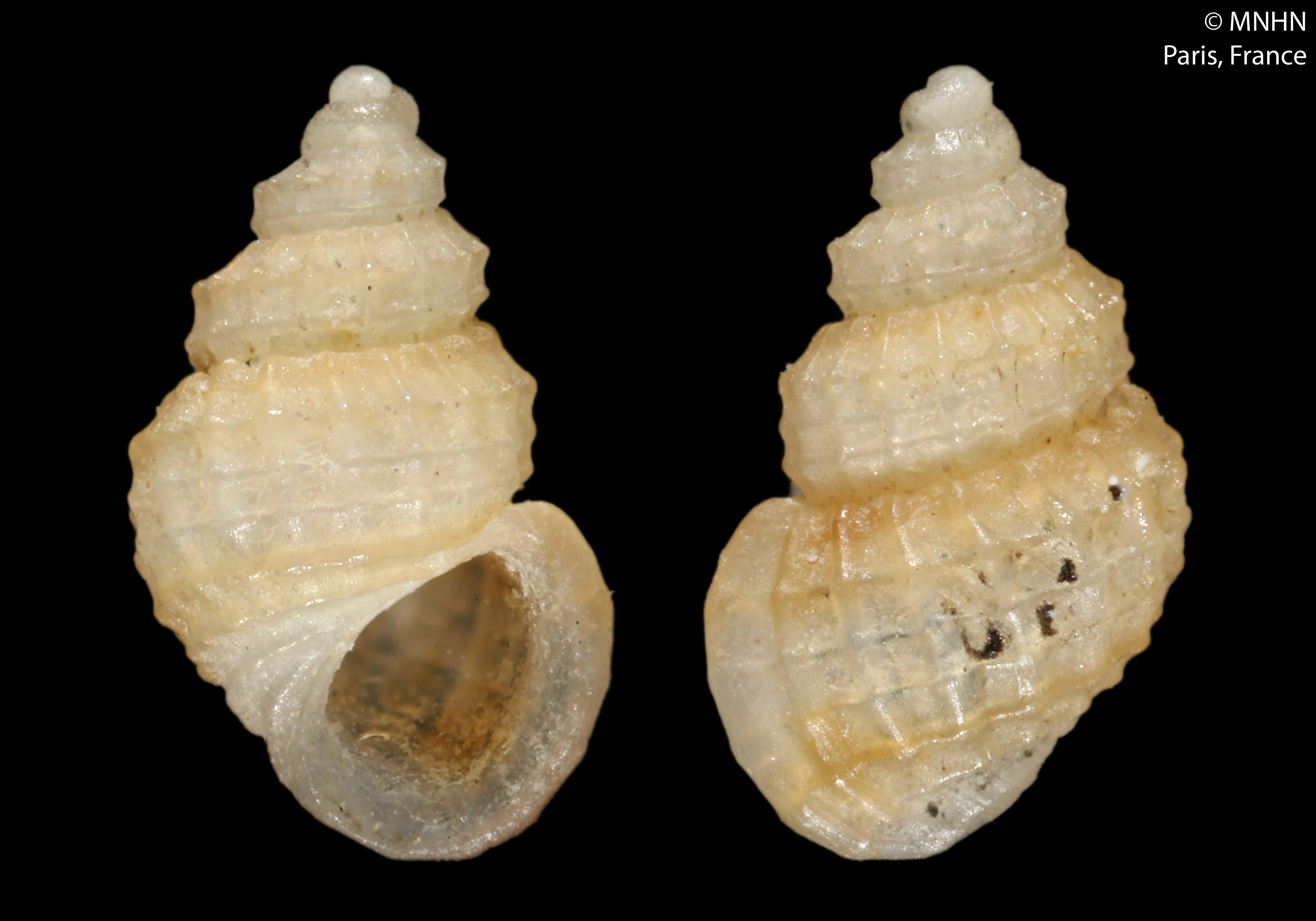
- Shell of Alvania desabatae (holotype at MNHN, Paris)

Scientific classification
- Kingdom: Animalia
- Phylum: Mollusca
- Class: Gastropoda
- Subclass: Caenogastropoda
- Order: Littorinimorpha
- Superfamily: Rissooidea
- Family: Rissoidae
- Genus: Alvania
- Species: A. desabatae

Binomial name
- Alvania desabatae Amati & Smriglio, 2016

= Alvania desabatae =

Species of gastropod

Alvania desabatae is a species of small sea snail, a marine gastropod mollusk or micromollusk in the family Rissoidae.

== Description ==
The length of the shell attains 2.35 mm.

== Distribution ==
This marine species occurs off the Ventotene island in the Tyrrhenian Sea.
