= Ventotene Lighthouse =

Ventotene
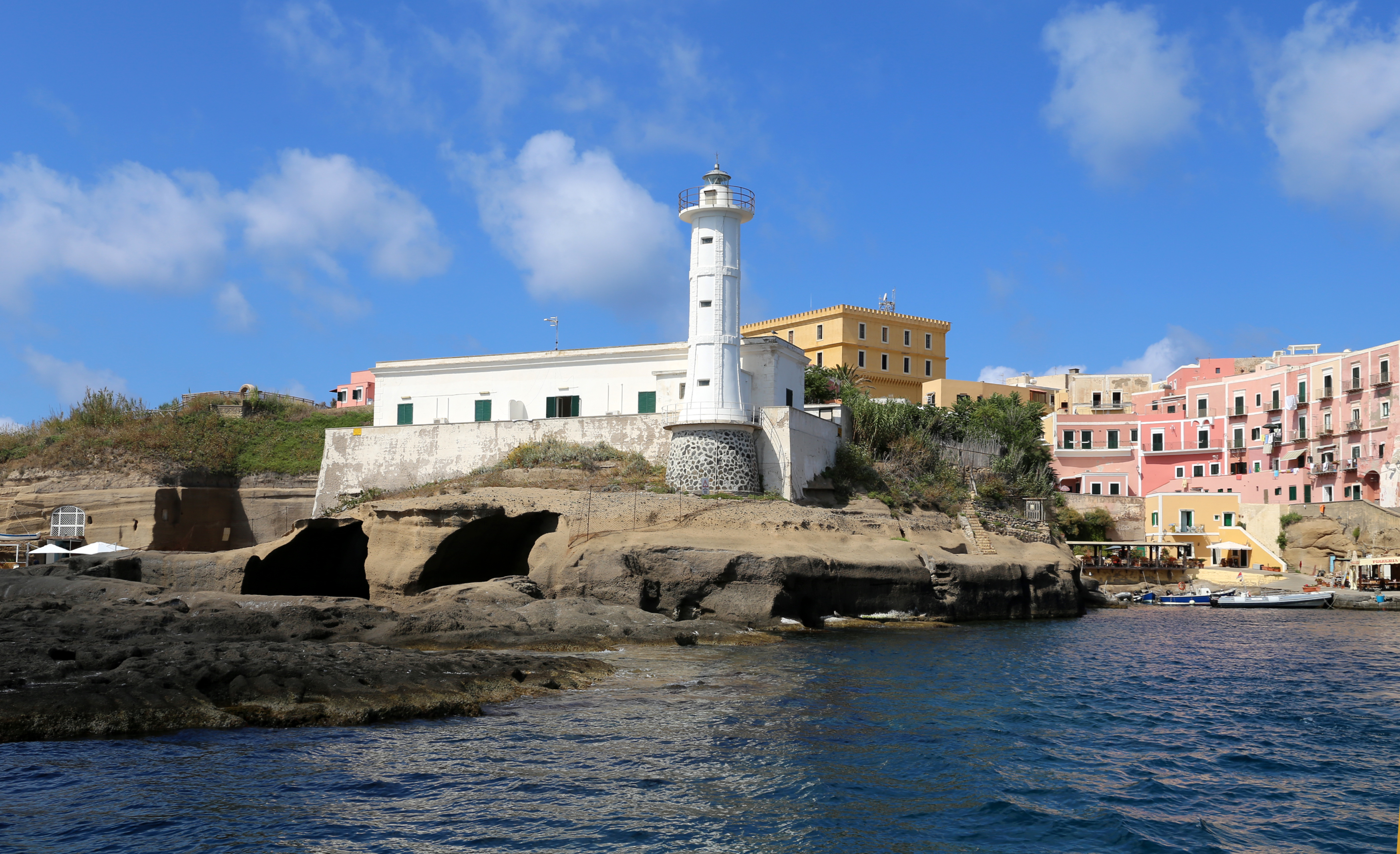
- Ventotene Lighthouse and Santo Stefano Island in the background
- Location: Ventotene; Province of Latina; Lazio; Italy
- Coordinates: 40°47′49″N 13°26′04″E

Tower
- Constructed: 1869 (first)
- Construction: masonry tower
- Height: 16 metres (52 ft)
- Shape: cylindrical tower with balcony and lantern
- Markings: white tower, grey metallic lantern dome
- Operator

Light
- First lit: 1891 (current)
- Focal height: 21 metres (69 ft)
- Lens: type TD 375 focal length: 187.5 mm
- Light source: main power
- Intensity: main: AL 1000 W reserve: LABI 100 W
- Range: main: 15 nautical miles (28 km; 17 mi) reserve: 11 nautical miles (20 km; 13 mi)
- Characteristic: Fl W 5s.
- Italy no.: 2286 E.F.

Ventotene Lighthouse (Italian: Faro di Ventotene) is an active lighthouse on the Ventotene Island placed nearby the Porto Romano.

== Description ==
The current lighthouse, built in 1891, is a masonry cylindrical tower 16 metres (52 ft) high attached to the seaward side keeper's house. The light is positioned at 21 metres (69 ft) above sea level andemits one white flash in a five seconds period visible up to 15 nautical miles (28 km; 17 mi). The lighthouse is completely automated and managed by the Marina Militare with the identification code number 2286 E.F.

== See also ==
- List of lighthouses in Italy
