= Santo Stefano Island =

Island in the Pontine Islands, Italy

Coordinates: 40°47′22″N 13°27′15″E

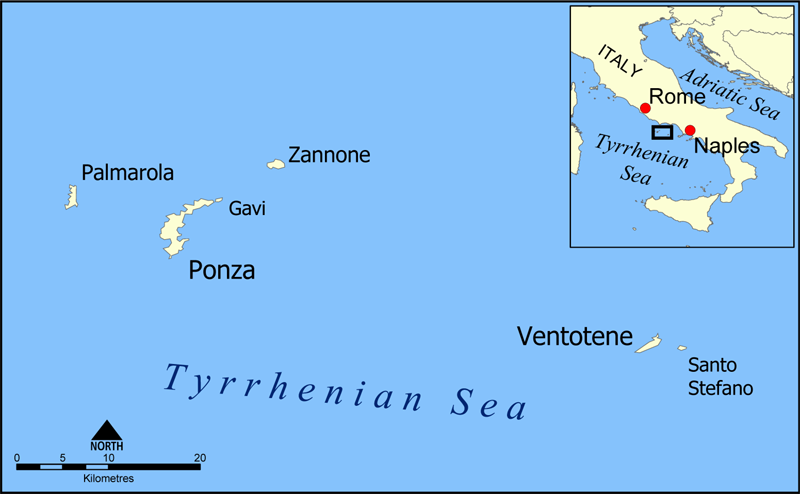
Santo Stefano and the Pontine Islands

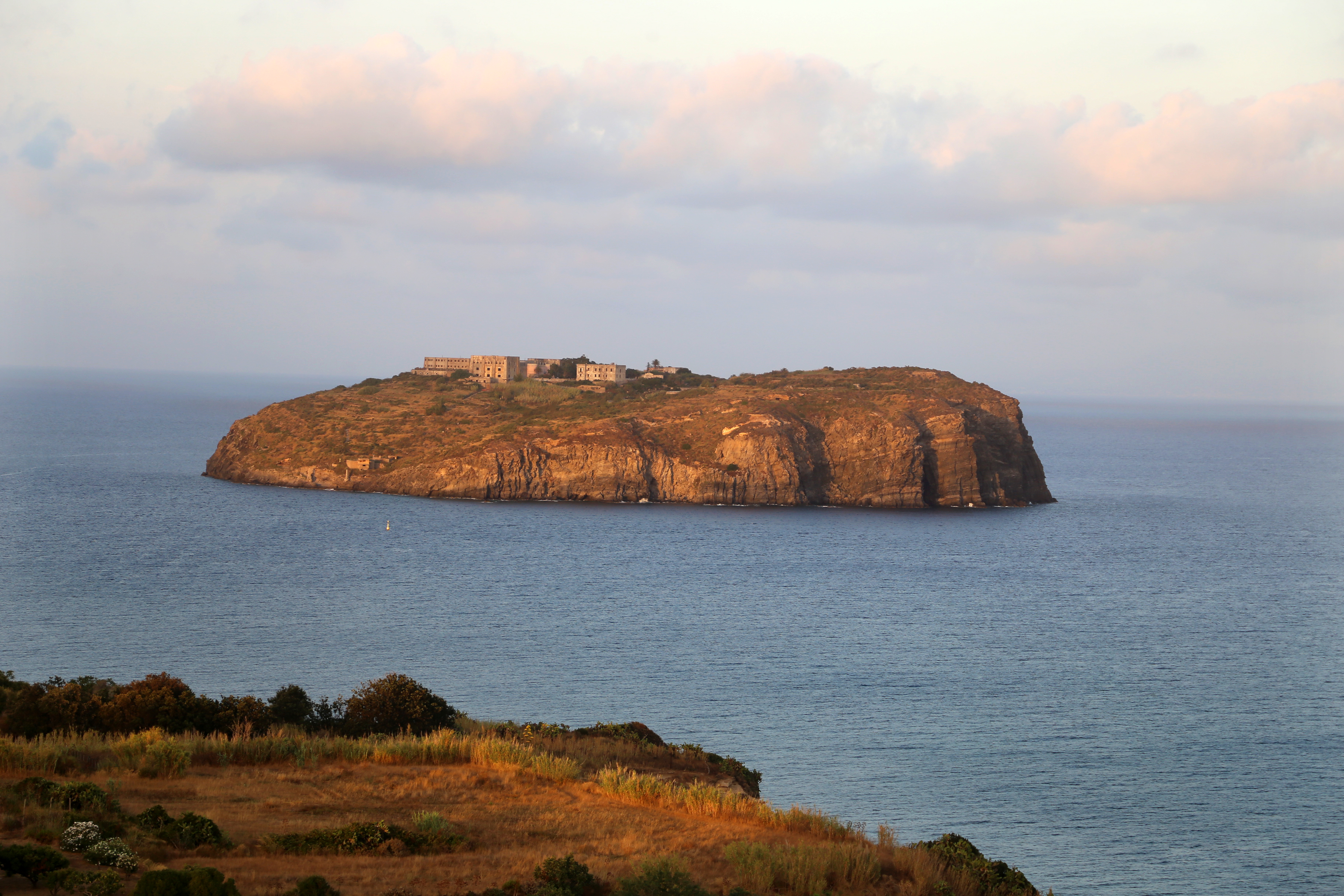
Santo Stefano Island

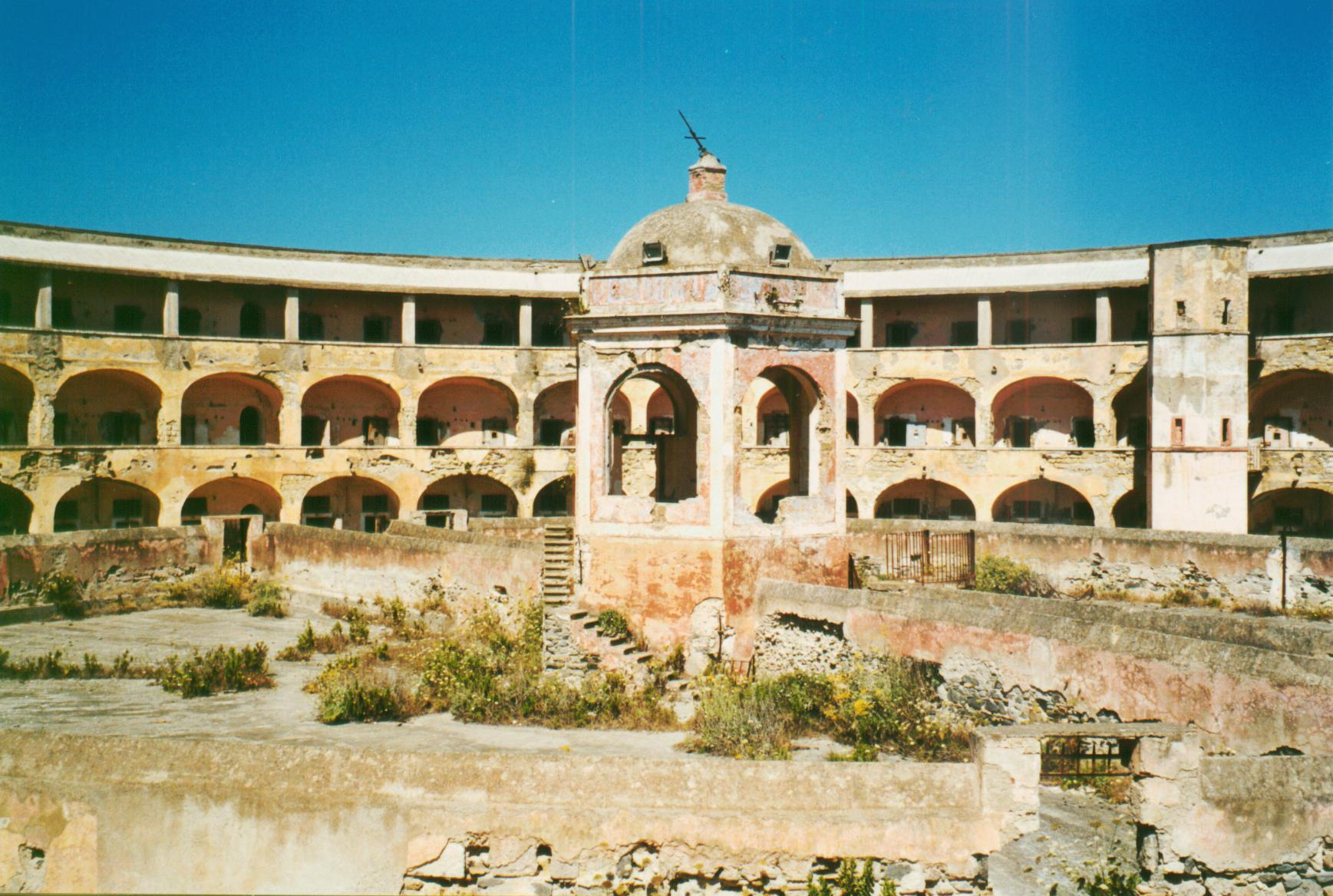
The abandoned prison of Santo Stefano

Santo Stefano (Italian: Isola di Santo Stefano) is an island in the Tyrrhenian Sea off the west coast of Italy, and part of the Pontine Islands. It is roughly circular, with a diameter of less than 400 metres (1,300 feet), and it is located 2 kilometres (1 1/4 miles) east of the nearby island of Ventotene. From 1797 to 1965, it was the site of the Santo Stefano Prison.

== Overview ==
Like the rest of the archipelago, the island was created by volcanic activity.

It has been uninhabited since the closure of the prison, except for tourists making day trips.

It has had several names, such as Partenope, Palmosa, Dommo Stephane and Borca since Roman times.

The island, which is partly privately owned, was put up for sale in 2012 for €20,000,000. This did not include the prison, which belongs to the Italian state.

On 26 July 2021, the European Observer reported that a refurbishment project was to be announced to turn the island into a European think-tank, academy and open-air museum as part of a European integration project.

In March 2025, an exhibit on the history of the prison and on the plans for renovation was announced for September 2025. A government official said that "21 cultural institutions and universities have signed agreements to produce content and organize cultural initiatives on Santo Stefano".

== Wildlife ==
This island once harbored an endemic lizard, the Santo Stefano lizard (Podarcis sicula sanctistephani). It became extinct in 1965, probably due to feral cats and a snake species.

== Santo Stefano Prison ==
The island is dominated by the Santo Stefano Prison built by the Bourbons, completed in 1797. It is a three-story building in a horseshoe configuration. The prison's design is based on Jeremy Bentham's Panopticon, which allows all prison cells to be observed by a single unseen guard, who may or may not be present, giving them the sensation of being constantly watched. The tower in the middle is not a watchtower, but a chapel, so inmates could observe the celebration of mass.

It originally had 99 cells, each four metres by four metres and accommodating four inmates. The cell size was later halved to double the number of cells. Built for 600 inmates, it had 800 in 1817 (and 400 on Ventotene).

In October 1860, some of the Bourbon troops left the island for the siege of Gaeta. During a revolt, some Camorra prisoners proclaimed the Republic of Santo Stefano. The prisoners legislated a statute and remained autonomous until January 1861, when a Navy contingent recovered the island.

Many famous political prisoners were incarcerated here, including Carmine Crocco, the most important brigand during Italian unification, and Gaetano Bresci, the anarchist who assassinated King Umberto I in 1900 and was imprisoned for a year before being found hanging in his cell, which his supporters believed was actually a murder. During the Fascist regime, many antifascists were imprisoned here, including Sandro Pertini, later the president of Italy, Umberto Terracini, Giorgio Amendola, Lelio Basso, Mauro Scoccimarro, Giuseppe Romita, Altiero Spinelli and Ernesto Rossi.

The prison was closed in 1965.

== See also ==
- List of islands of Italy
