= Once There Was a War =

1958 essay collection by John Steinbeck

First edition (publ. Viking Press)

Once There Was a War, published in 1958, is a collection of articles written by John Steinbeck while he was a special war correspondent for the New York Herald Tribune from June to December 1943.

Steinbeck's articles include descriptions of life on a troop transporter, an account of the liberation of a small Sicilian town, a description of how homesick US soldiers tried to grow their native vegetables in the English gardens where they billeted, and an account of how a detachment of US paratroopers tricked the German garrison at Ventotene into surrendering.

Steinbeck did not report 'straight news', as he put it: he did not cover battles, or interview national or military leaders. As befitted the author of The Grapes of Wrath, Steinbeck wrote about the experiences of the ordinary people, those who were doing the actual fighting, and those who did the vast number of unglamorous but vital support jobs which kept the armed forces operating.

In his Introduction, Steinbeck confesses that he felt 'a visitor' to the war, and was uncomfortable knowing that he could go home at any time, while the serving personnel could not. For this reason, he said, 'I never admitted to seeing anything myself, but always put my story in the mouth of another.' How much of his reporting is therefore of the 'eyewitness' class cannot be determined. For example, his descriptions of American and British torpedo boats in action against German forces seem like first-hand accounts, yet he nowhere refers to himself as present, despite his inclusion of convincing dialogue and detail. However, in his Travels with Charley, Steinbeck mentions wearing a naval officer's cap, 'Given me by a British torpedo boat captain, a very gentle gentleman and a murderer,' which phrase suggests that Steinbeck may well have observed action at first hand.
