= Zannone Lighthouse =

- Location: Zannone, Lazio, Italy
- Coordinates: 40°58′24″N 13°03′17″E

Tower
- Constructed: 1884
- Foundation: masonry base
- Construction: masonry tower
- Height: 13 metres (43 ft)
- Shape: octagonal tower with balcony and lantern atop 1-storey keeper's house
- Markings: white tower, grey metallic lantern dome
- Power source: solar power
- Operator: Marina Militare

Light
- First lit: 1884
- Focal height: 37 metres (121 ft)
- Lens: Type 500
- Light source: MAXIHALO 60 II EFF
- Range: 11 nautical miles (20 km; 13 mi)
- Characteristic: Fl (3) 10s.
- Italy no.: 2262 E.F.

Zannone Lighthouse (Italian: Faro Isola Zannone) is an active lighthouse located in the northern part of Zannone in the Pontine Islands on the Tyrrhenian Sea.

== Description ==
The lighthouse, built in 1858, consists of a masonry octagonal tower, 13 metres (43 ft) high, rising from 1-storey keeper's house. The tower is painted white and the lantern dome in grey metallic.

The light is positioned at 37 metres (121 ft) above sea level and emits three white flashes in a 10 seconds period, visible up to a distance of 11 nautical miles (20 km; 13 mi). The lighthouse is completely automated and managed by the Marina Militare with the identification code number 2262 E.F.

== See also ==
- List of lighthouses in Italy
