= Pope Silverius =

Head of the Catholic Church from 536 to 537

Pope Saint Silverius
- Bishop of Rome
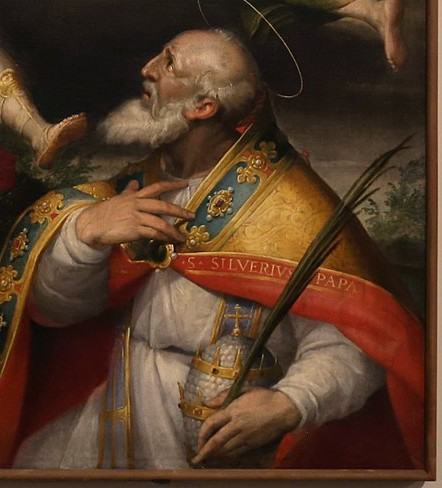
- Depiction by Orazio Samacchini, c. 1570
- Church: Catholic Church
- Papacy began: 8 June 536
- Papacy ended: March 537
- Predecessor: Agapetus I
- Successor: Vigilius

Personal details
- Born: Frosinone, Kingdom of Odoacer
- Died: 2 December 537 Palmarola, Eastern Roman Empire
- Parents: Pope Hormisdas

Sainthood
- Feast day: 20 June
- Patronage: Island of Ponza

Pope Silverius (died 2 December 537) was bishop of Rome from 8 June 536 to his deposition in 537, a few months before his death. His rapid rise to prominence from a deacon to the papacy coincided with the efforts of Ostrogothic king Theodahad (nephew to Theodoric the Great), who intended to install a pro-Gothic candidate just before the Gothic War. Later deposed by Byzantine general Belisarius, he was tried and sent to exile on the desolated island of Palmarola, where he starved to death in 537.

== Life ==
He was a legitimate son of Pope Hormisdas, born in Frosinone, Lazio, some time before his father entered the priesthood. Silverius was probably consecrated 8 June 536. He was a subdeacon when king Theodahad of the Ostrogoths forced his election and consecration. Historian Jeffrey Richards interprets his low rank prior to becoming pope as an indication that Theodahad was eager to put a pro-Gothic candidate on the throne on the eve of the Gothic War and "had passed over the entire diaconate as untrustworthy". The Liber Pontificalis alleges that Silverius had purchased his elevation from King Theodahad.

On 9 December 536, the Byzantine general Belisarius entered Rome with the approval of Pope Silverius. Theodahad's successor Witiges gathered together an army and besieged Rome for several months, subjecting the city to privation and starvation. In the words of Richards, "What followed is as tangled a web of treachery and double-dealing as can be found anywhere in the papal annals. Several different versions of the course of events following the elevation of Silverius exist, but his removal came quickly." In outline, all accounts agree: Silverius was deposed by Belisarius in March 537 and sent into exile after being judged by the wife of Belisarius, Antonina, who accused him of conspiring with the Goths. Not only did Belisarius exile Silverius, he also banished a number of distinguished senators, Flavius Maximus—a descendant of a previous emperor—among them. Vigilius, who was in Constantinople as apocrisiarius or papal legate, was brought to Rome to replace Silverius as the pontiff.

The fullest account is in the Breviarium of Liberatus of Carthage, who portrays Vigilius "as a greedy and treacherous pro-Monophysite who ousted and virtually murdered his predecessor." In exchange for being made Pope, Liberatus claims he promised Empress Theodora to restore the former patriarch of Constantinople, Anthimus, to his position. Silverius was sent into exile at Patara in Lycia, whose bishop petitioned the emperor for a fair trial for Silverius. Rattled by this, Justinian ordered Silverius returned to Rome to be tried accordingly. However, when Silverius returned to Italy, instead of holding a trial Belisarius handed him over to Vigilius, who according to the Liber Pontificalis banished Silverius to the desolate island Palmarola (part of the Pontine Islands), where he starved to death a few months later.

The account in the Liber Pontificalis is hardly more favorable to Vigilius. That work agrees with Liberatus that the restoration of Anthimus to the Patriarchate was the cause of Silverius' deposition, but Vigilius was initially sent to persuade Silverius to agree to this, not replace him. Silverius refused and Vigilius then claimed to Belisarius that Pope Silverius had written to Witiges offering to betray the city. Belisarius did not believe this accusation, but Vigilius produced false witnesses to testify to this, and through persistence overcame his scruples. Silverius was summoned to the Pincian palace, where he was stripped of his vestments and handed over to Vigilius, who dispatched him into exile. Procopius omits all mention of religious controversy in Vigilius' actions. He writes that Silverius was accused of offering to betray Rome to the Goths. Upon learning of this, Belisarius had him deposed, put in a monk's habit and exiled to Greece. Several other senators were also banished from Rome at the same time on similar charges. Belisarius then appointed Vigilius. Deprived of sufficient sustenance, Silverius starved to death on the island of Palmarola.

Richards attempts to reconcile these divergent accounts into a unified account. He points out that Liberatus wrote his Breviarium at the height of the Three-Chapter Controversy, "when Vigilius was being regarded by his opponents as anti-Christ and Liberatus was prominent among these opponents", and the Liber Pontificalis drew from an account written at the same time. Once these religious elements are removed, Richards argues that it is clear "the whole episode was political in nature." He points out for Justinian's plans to recover Rome and Italy, "that there should be a pro-Eastern pope substituted as soon as possible. The ideal candidate was at hand in Constantinople. The deacon Vigilius' principal motivation throughout his career, as far as can be ascertained, was the desire to be pope and he was not really concerned about which faction put him there."

== Canonization ==
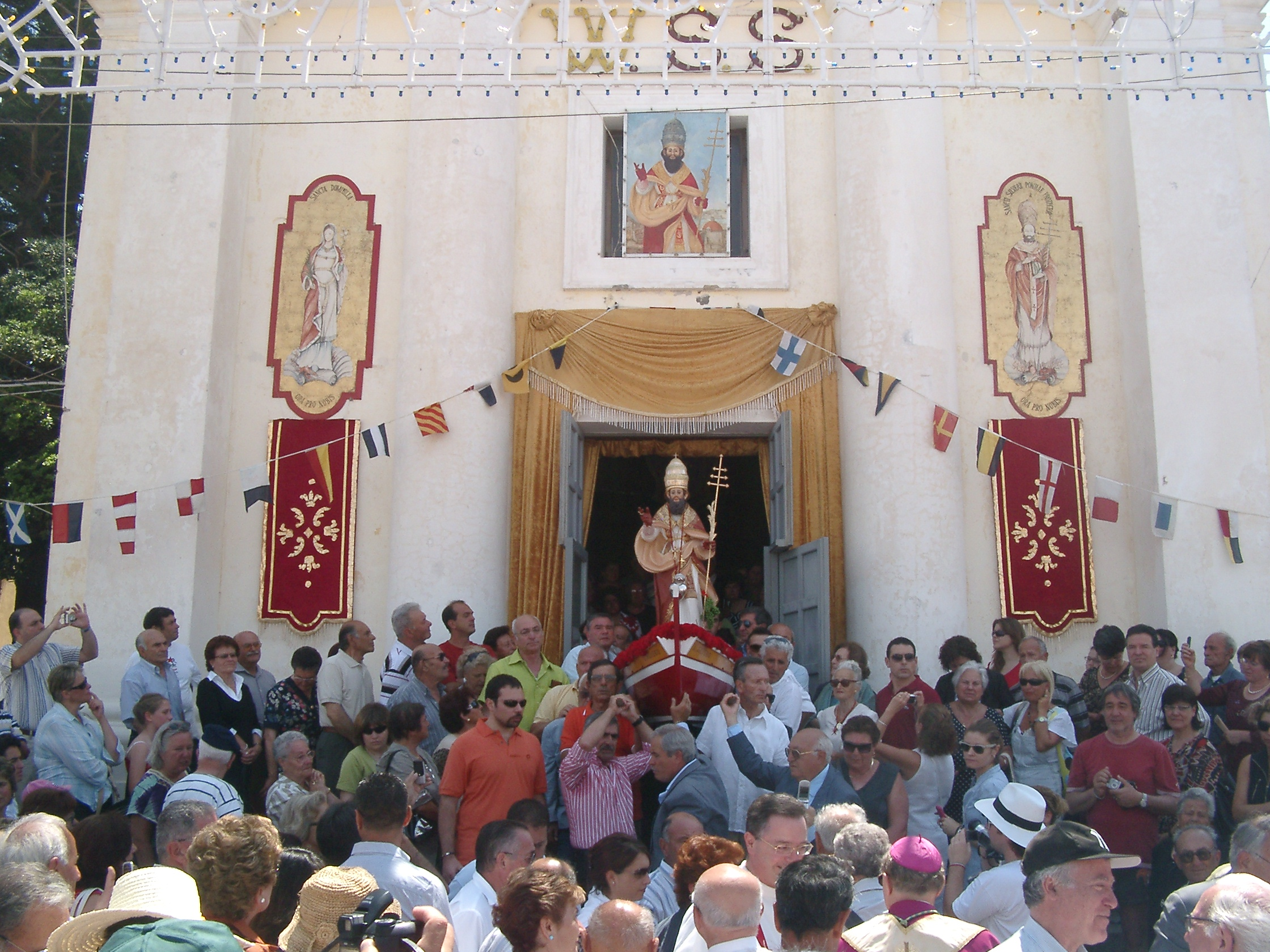
Feast day of Saint Silverius, Ponza. 20 June 2008

Silverius was later recognized as a saint by popular acclamation, and is now the patron saint of the island of Ponza, Italy. According to Ponza Islands legend, fishermen were in a small boat in a storm off Palmarola and they called on Saint Silverius for help. An apparition of Saint Silverius called them to Palmarola, where they survived. This miracle made him venerated as a saint. The first mention of his name in a list of saints dates to the 11th century. He is also called Saint Silverius (San Silverio). While Pope Silverius perished without fanfare and largely unlamented during the 6th century, the people from the neighboring island of Ponza have honored the virtuous St. Silverio, a heritage that reaches from the island to the United States, where many settlers from the island have settled in the Morrisania section of the Bronx. From there, they celebrated the Festival of San Silverio at Our Lady of Pity Church on 151st Street and Morris Avenue, just as they had for centuries, calling on him for help.

In 1987, the San Silverio Committee of Morris Park Inc. was founded, allowing those of Ponzese descent and those devoted to San Silverio to celebrate the feast closer to their home. Offering yearly novenas, and a traditional feast on 20 June, devotees gather in Saint Clare of Assisi Church for a Mass, followed by a procession throughout the neighborhood. The San Silverio Committee of Morris Park have offered their talents to the parish of Saint Clare's for many years, designing and building a 30-foot Neapolitan crèche at Christmas, and erecting a tomb for the Easter season.

Adding to the feast of San Silverio, the committee honors Saint Anthony and the Immaculate Conception with novenas, Mass and procession. The neighborhood has seen changes in recent years but is still populated with Italian restaurants and food stores, where the festival continues to unify the community. After the Church of Our Lady of Pity was deconsecrated in November 2017, the statue of San Silverio found a home at St. Ann's Church at 31 College Place, Yonkers, New York. The feast of San Silverio is observed there every year on 20 June with a special Mass and procession of the Statue of San Silverio. The statue is on permanent display for veneration by the faithful.

== See also ==
- List of Eastern Orthodox saints
- List of Catholic saints
- List of popes
- Pope Silverius, patron saint archive

== Literature ==
- Louise Ropes Loomis, The Book of Popes ("Liber Pontificalis"). Merchantville, NJ: Evolution Publishing. ISBN 1-889758-86-8 (Reprint of the 1916 edition. English translation with scholarly footnotes, and illustrations).
- Wilhelm Kohl (1995). "Silverius". In Bautz, Traugott (ed.). Biographisch-Bibliographisches Kirchenlexikon (BBKL) (in German). Vol. 10. Herzberg: Bautz. cols. 336–338. ISBN 3-88309-062-X.
- Claire Sotinel: Silverio, in: Enciclopedia dei Papi. 2000
- https://www.newadvent.org/cathen/13793a.htm CE

Catholic Church titles
Preceded by Agapetus I	Pope; 536–537	Succeeded by Vigilius
