= Casate Ticino =

Casate
- Frazione
- Location of Casate in Italy
- Coordinates: 45°29′00″N 08°49′00″E
- Country: Italy
- Region: Lombardy
- Province: Milan
- Comune: Bernate Ticino
- Elevation: 130 m (430 ft)

Population (2009)
  - Total: 1,100
- Demonym: casatesi
- Time zone: UTC+1 (CET)
  - Summer (DST): UTC+2 (CEST)
- Postal code: 20010
- Dialing code: +39 (02)
- Patron saint: Blessed Virgin Mary, Our Lady of Sorrows
- Saint day: December 8, September 15
- Website: Municipality of Bernate Ticino

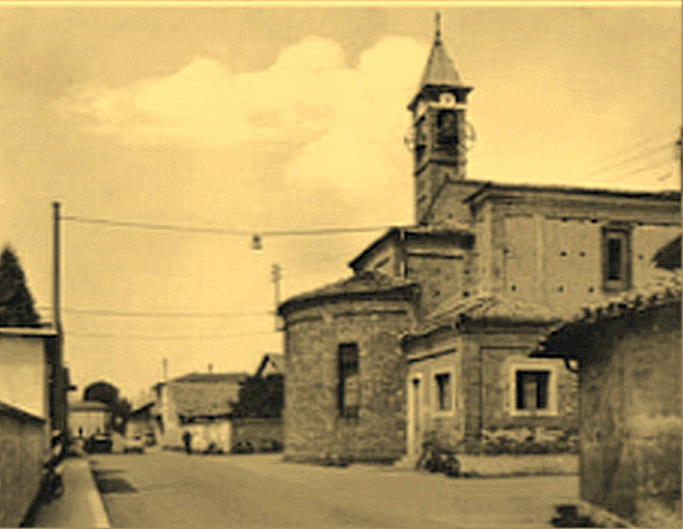
View of Casate, province of Milan, Italy. Postcard from the 50s

Casate ("Casá", in the local dialect) is an Italian village in the municipality of Bernate Ticino, near Milan, in Lombardy. As of 2009 its population was of 1,100 circa.

== History ==
=== Overview ===
Casate is first mentioned in 1603, in "Atti della visita pastorale" of Cardinal Federico Borromeo.

At the end of 1600 the abbot Ferdinand Crivelli decided to build a church, for the peasants of the small village. The church was consecrated in 1705, and a plaque still reads as set out in the place of worship:

QUO FACILIUS CULTORES AGRI
CIRCUMIECTI INTERESSENT REI SACRAE
ABBAS GENTIS CRIBELLIAE EX IURE PATRONAT(U)S
AEDEM VIRGINI MAGNAE SINE LABE CONCEPTAE
ANNO MDCCV
DEDICABAT

=== Origins of the name ===
The name "Casate" probably derives from common term "casates", farmhouses scattered in fields, in the dialect of the 1600–1700.

== Geography ==
=== Position ===
Casate is located east of Ticino river and west of Milan, seat of the province, which is 27 km far from the village.

The village borders are north to Cuggiono, east to Mesero, south and west with the town of Bernate Ticino.
