= Ventotene =

Ventotene Vientutene (Neapolitan)
- Comune
- Comune di Ventotene
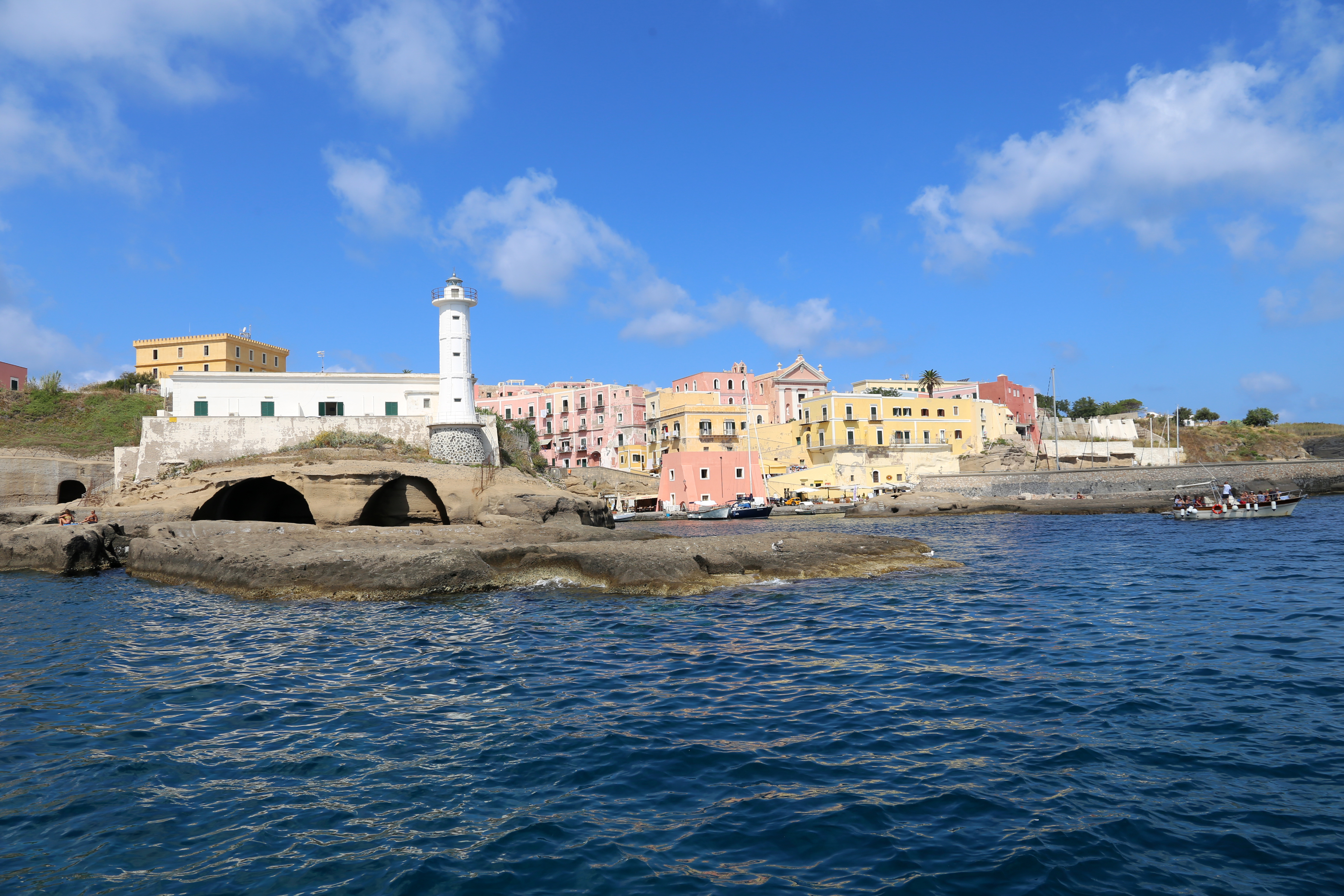
- View of Ventotene

- Coat of arms

- Ventotene within the Province of Latina

- Location within Italy Location within Lazio
- Coordinates: 40°47′51″N 13°25′48″E
- Country: Italy
- Region: Lazio
- Province: Latina (LT)

Government
  - Mayor: Carmine Caputo (Civic list)

Area
  - Total: 1.75 km^{2} (0.68 sq mi)
- Elevation: 18 m (59 ft)

Population (2026)
  - Total: 678
  - Density: 387/km^{2} (1,000/sq mi)
- Demonym: Ventotenesi
- Time zone: UTC+1 (CET)
  - Summer (DST): UTC+2 (CEST)
- Postal code: 04031
- Dialing code: 0771
- ISTAT code: 059033
- Patron saint: St. Candida
- Saint day: September 20
- Website: Official website

Ventotene (Italian: [ventoˈtɛːne]; locally Neapolitan: Vientutene; Latin: Pandataria or Pandateria; Ancient Greek: Πανδατερία, romanized: Pandatería, or Πανδατωρία, Pandatōría) is one of the Pontine Islands in the Tyrrhenian Sea, 46 kilometres (25 nautical miles) off the coast of Gaeta right at the border between Lazio and Campania in Italy.

The municipality of Ventotene, administratively in the province of Latina and the region of Lazio, includes the island of Santo Stefano, and has 678 inhabitants.

== History ==
=== Roman Empire ===
Ventotene, like all the Pontine Islands, was owned by the Emperor Augustus (r. 31 BC – 14 AD), who had a huge summer palace built on the island in the early part of his reign, including extensive thermae, terraces, gardens, an exedra and aqueducts, and which remained thereafter an imperial property. It is now known as the Villa Giulia as it was possibly the place to which he banished his daughter Julia the Elder in 2 BC as a reaction to her notorious adultery and where he could easily keep an eye on her. Augustus had two villas on the island but Julia was probably sent to the Villa Giulia located on the Punta d'Eolo on the north of the island, with all the facilities of an imperial retreat.

In 29 AD, emperor Tiberius banished Augustus' granddaughter Agrippina the Elder, who perished, probably of malnutrition, on 18 October 33 AD. After Agrippina the Elder's son Gaius (better known as Caligula) became emperor in 37 AD, he went to Pandateria to collect her remains and reverently brought them back to Rome. Agrippina the Elder's youngest daughter, Julia Livilla, was exiled to Pandateria twice: the first time by her brother Caligula for plotting to depose him, and the second time by her uncle, the emperor Claudius, at the instigation of his wife, Messalina, in 41 AD.

Sometime later, Julia Livilla was discreetly starved to death and her remains were probably brought back to Rome when her older sister Agrippina the Younger became influential as Claudius' wife. Another distinguished lady of the Julio-Claudian dynasty, Claudia Octavia, who was the first wife of the emperor Nero, was banished to Pandateria in 62 AD and then executed on the orders of her husband.

This is also the island to which St. Flavia Domitilla, the granddaughter of the emperor Vespasian, was banished.

=== Twentieth century ===
A prison camp was created under the Bourbons and restructured under Benito Mussolini on the nearby island of Santo Stefano. There, up to 700 opponents, including 400 communists, were incarcerated between 1939 and 1943. One of them was Altiero Spinelli, who wrote there a text now known as the "Ventotene Manifesto", promoting the idea of a federal Europe after the war.

During World War II, the island served as home to a 114-man German garrison, which defended a key radar station. On the night of 8 December 1943, an American PT boat slipped into Ventotene's harbour undetected and offloaded 46 American paratroopers from the 509th Parachute Infantry Battalion, led by naval lieutenant (and actor) Douglas Fairbanks Jr., who was tactical commander of the Beach Jumpers; a group that used all forms available of deception to deceive the enemy, and commando-trained. The paratroopers met with a local exile from the Italian mainland who then lied to the German commander that there was a regiment of paratroopers on the island, deposited by a fleet of Allied ships. Terrified, the German commander demolished his positions, weapons, and quickly surrendered to the weaker American force before realizing his mistake. Ventotene was liberated at 03:00 without a shot being fired. The story is reported by John Steinbeck in Once There Was a War.

In August 2016, then-Italian Prime Minister Matteo Renzi met with then-German Chancellor Angela Merkel and then-French President François Hollande on Ventotene, to lay a wreath at the tomb of Altiero Spinelli and review European Union policy in the light of the then-impending British withdrawal from the EU.

== Geography ==
The island, the remains of an ancient volcano, is elongated, with a length of 3 kilometres (2 miles) and a maximum width of about 800 metres (2,600 feet).

The municipality includes the small ancillary island of Santo Stefano, located 2 km (1 1/4 mi) to the east, which was the site of a massive prison, now closed. Further islands are Ponza, Palmarola and Zannone, located 40 km (25 mi) to the west.

=== Climate ===
Ventotene has a typical Mediterranean climate with hot, dry summers and mild, wet winters that tend to be very windy. Vento, as in the island's name, meaning wind in Italian, is apt to describe the prominent weather condition for this small island far out at sea. The temperature never drops below 0 °C (32 °F).

=== Nature Reserve ===
Ventotene and Santo Stefano are both part of a nature reserve created in 1999 in order to preserve the ecological, geomorphological and naturalistic-environmental characteristics and to promote activities compatible with the conservation of the reserve's natural resources. This means that new buildings cannot be erected, and reconstruction is limited.

=== Marine Reserve ===
The marine reserve, which covers a 10 km long coastal area, is divided into three zones with varying degrees of protection and permitted activities.

Ventotene is a popular destination for scuba divers due to its clear, warm waters and variety of marine life. Several diving centres take divers of all levels of competency to nearby destinations to see caves filled with prawns, or swim among fish which have become rather unafraid of people since fishing was banned in 1997. There are also guided tours to see Roman amphorae from ships sunk 2000 years ago and the large steamer Santa Lucia, which was sunk during World War II, resulting in nearly 100 dead. It lies at a depth of about40 m (130 ft). There is also a lot to be seen with the use of snorkeling gear at only a few meters depth around the island and its beaches.

=== Bird migration ===
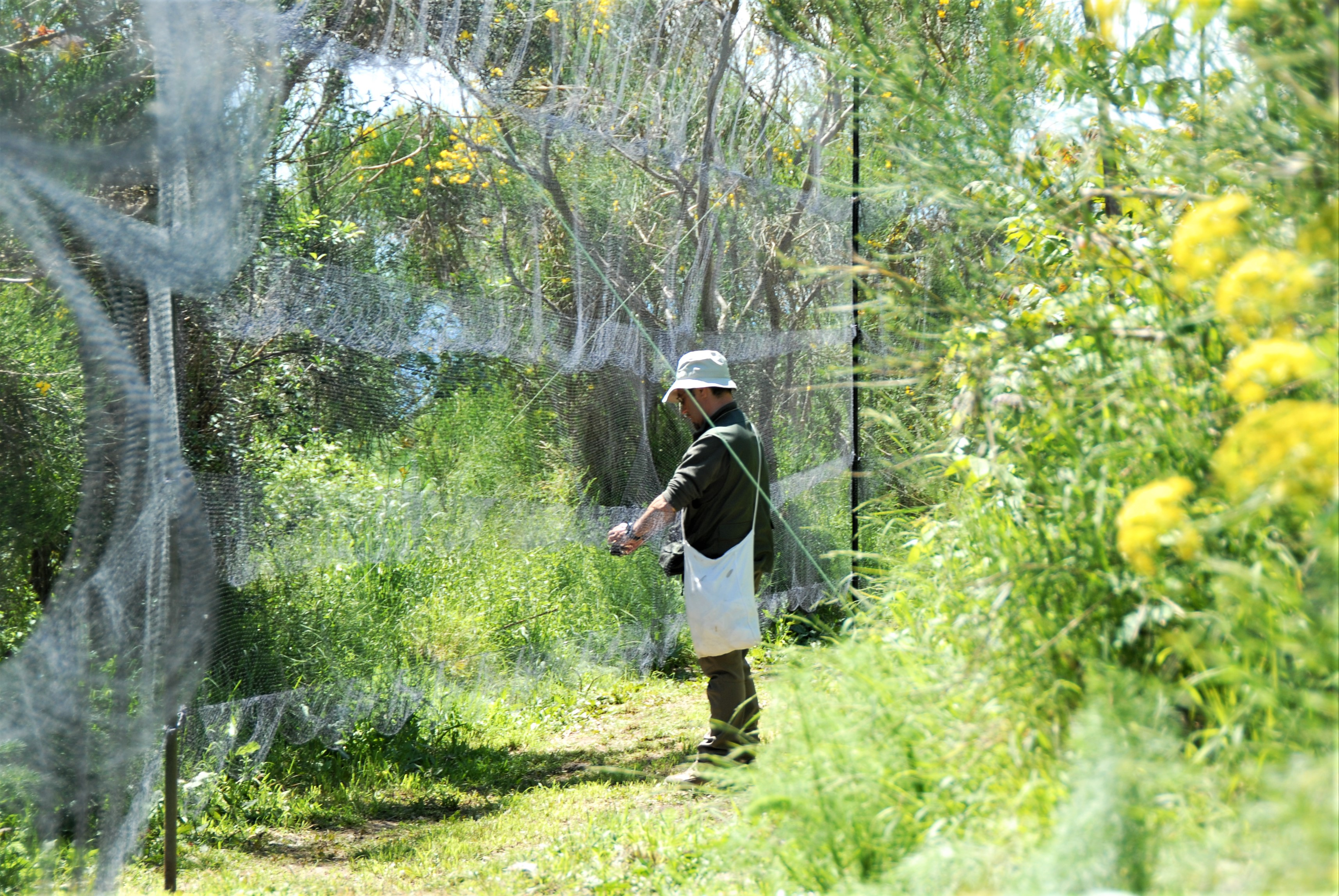
Birds being released from nets, ready for ringing

Ventotene is a well-known birdwatching location as the island serves as an essential stopover point for large numbers of migratory birds. The bird observatory, which was founded in 1988, rings approximately 20,000 birds a year. During the height of the spring migration in April and May, thousands of birds arrive daily from North Africa's coasts after having flown 400 – 500 km non-stop. The Pontian Archipelago offers the first chance to stop after the prolonged flight and, due to the tiny size of Ventotene, the concentration of birds of numerous species is extremely high. The exhausted birds rest and feed frenetically quite indifferent to human presence, allowing birdwatchers to observe and photograph them as in few other places in Italy.

The bird observatory is part of PPI (Progetto Piccole Isole), a project which has studied the bird migration across the Mediterranean since 1988 at 46 sites in seven countries. The results of these studies led to the creation of the Ventotene Bird Migration Museum in 2006.

== Demographics ==
Historical population
Year	Pop.	±%
1861	1,163	—
1871	2,049	+76.2%
1881	2,101	+2.5%
1901	1,986	−5.5%
1911	1,435	−27.7%
1921	1,302	−9.3%
1931	1,239	−4.8%
1936	1,379	+11.3%
1951	1,270	−7.9%
1961	1,068	−15.9%
1971	508	−52.4%
1981	498	−2.0%
1991	671	+34.7%
2001	633	−5.7%
2011	691	+9.2%
2021	704	+1.9%
Source: ISTAT

As of 2026, the population is 678, of which 56.2% are male, and 43.8% are female. Minors make up 9.4% of the population, and seniors make up 26.4%.

=== Immigration ===
As of 2025, immigrants make up 13.1% of the population. The 5 largest foreign countries of birth are Romania, Ukraine, Bangladesh, Brazil, and Bulgaria.

== Culture ==
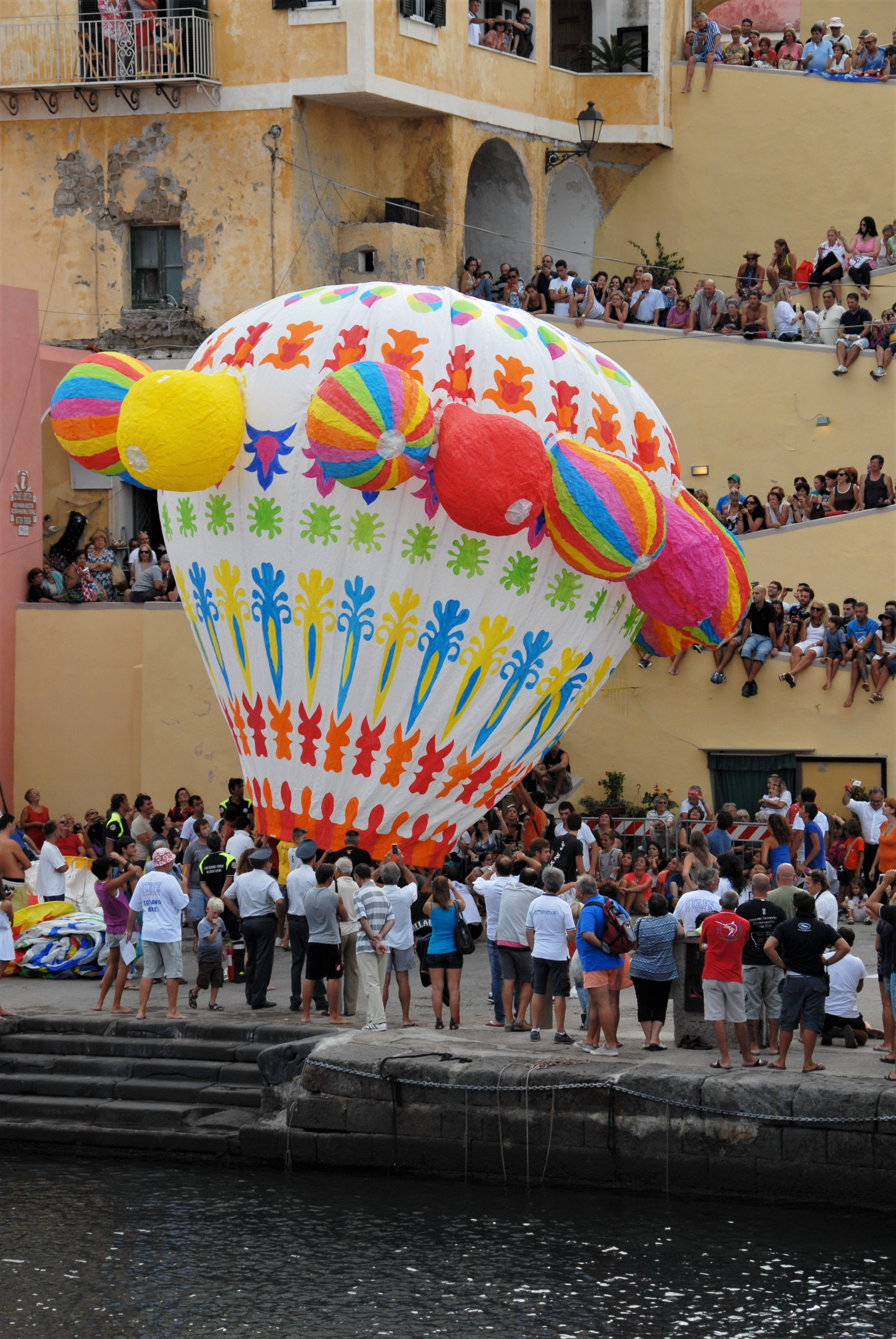
Launch of a hot air balloon at the Santa Candida festival

=== Santa Candida Festival ===
The celebration of the island's patron saint, Saint Candida, takes place on 20 September, but the festivities start ten days beforehand with the daily launch of a hot air balloon accompanied by a marching band. The decorated paper balloons, a type of giant sky lantern up to 10 m in height, are constructed by the island's youth during the summer and on the 19th there is a balloon competition as part of “The Games” that take place in the Roman port all afternoon. The festival culminates in a day-long feast and religious procession on the 20th, when a statue of Saint Candida, placed on a flower adorned boat, exits the church, and is carried around the island's narrow streets on the shoulders of eight men. As with all events during the festival, the band plays and firecrackers and fireworks are set off continuously. The celebrations end with two fireworks displays.

== Main sights ==
=== The Ruins of Villa Giulia ===
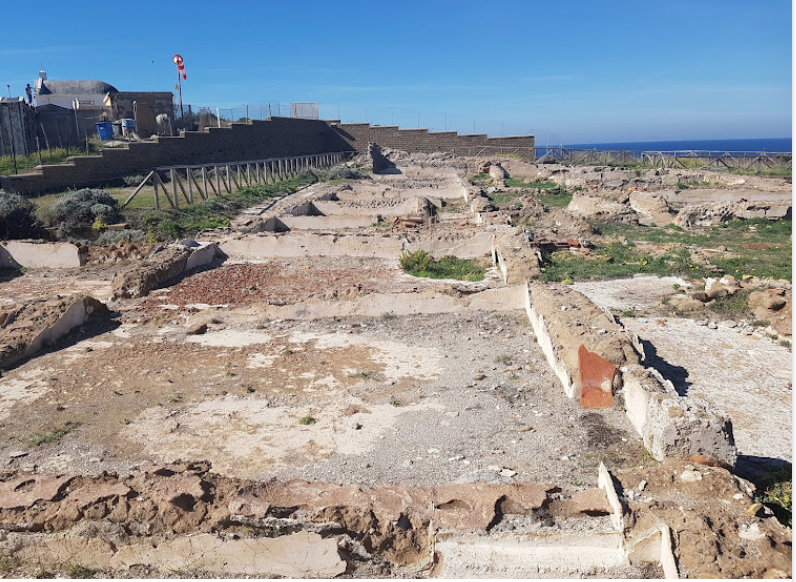
Domus farm area of Villa Giulia

In the early part of his reign, emperor Augustus had a summer palace built on the island, which at the time was private property. The remnants of the huge complex of over 3,000 m^{2} (32,000 ft^{2}), which included thermae, terraces, gardens, an exedra and aqueducts, can be seen at Punto Eolo. Over the centuries, the villa has been subject to systematic plundering and senseless excavations. However, excavations have revealed thermal baths, servants’ quarters, courtyards, water reservoirs and passages to the sea. The imperial summer residence has become known as Villa Giulia as it became the place of exile of Augustus's daughter Julia the Elder in 2 BC.

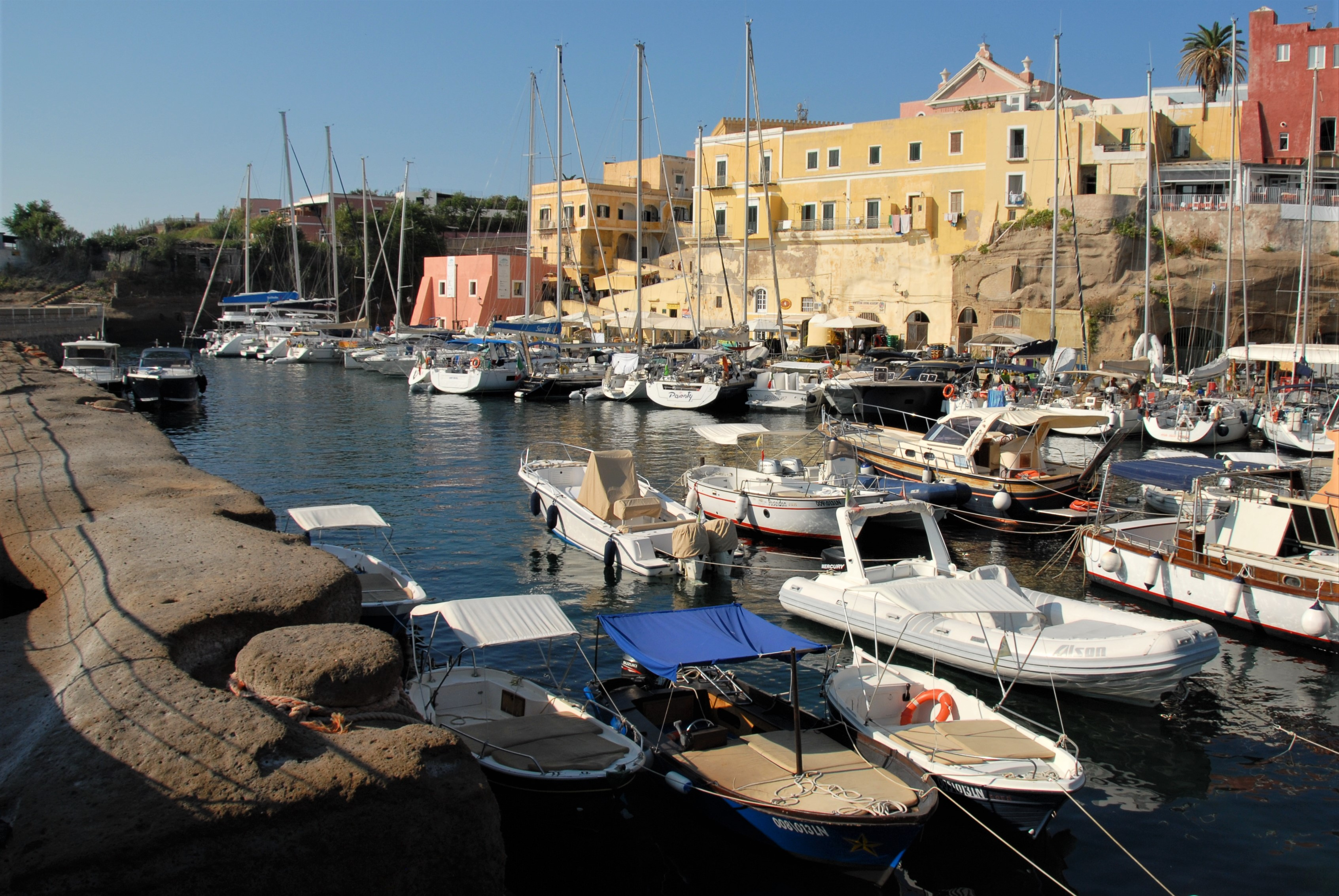
The Roman port with a mooring on the left

=== The Roman Port ===
The Roman port, which is still in use, was built to support emperor Augustus’ summer residence, as there was no natural harbour on the island. It was entirely excavated in the rock banks and about 60,000 m^{3} (2,100,000 ft^{3}) were removed to create a port with a narrow, protected inlet. It is approximately 180 m (590 ft) long by 85 m (279 ft) at its widest and 3 m (9.8 ft) deep. The quayside was lined by storerooms and depots hewn from the rock, nowadays converted to bars, restaurants, shops and diving centres.

=== The Fishery ===
At the foot of the lighthouse are the remnants of the Roman fishery excavated in the rock, consisting of three pools, one outside and two in rooms with arched roofs where fragments of decorated plaster and stuccoes remain. A sophisticated system of canals and shutters, devised for water exchange and the transfer of fish from one compartment to another, ensured a constant supply of many kinds of fresh fish to the imperial household, all year round and in all weather conditions.

The fishery is best viewed from the water, swimming with snorkeling gear, as the sea level today is about a metre (1 yard) higher than when it was constructed.

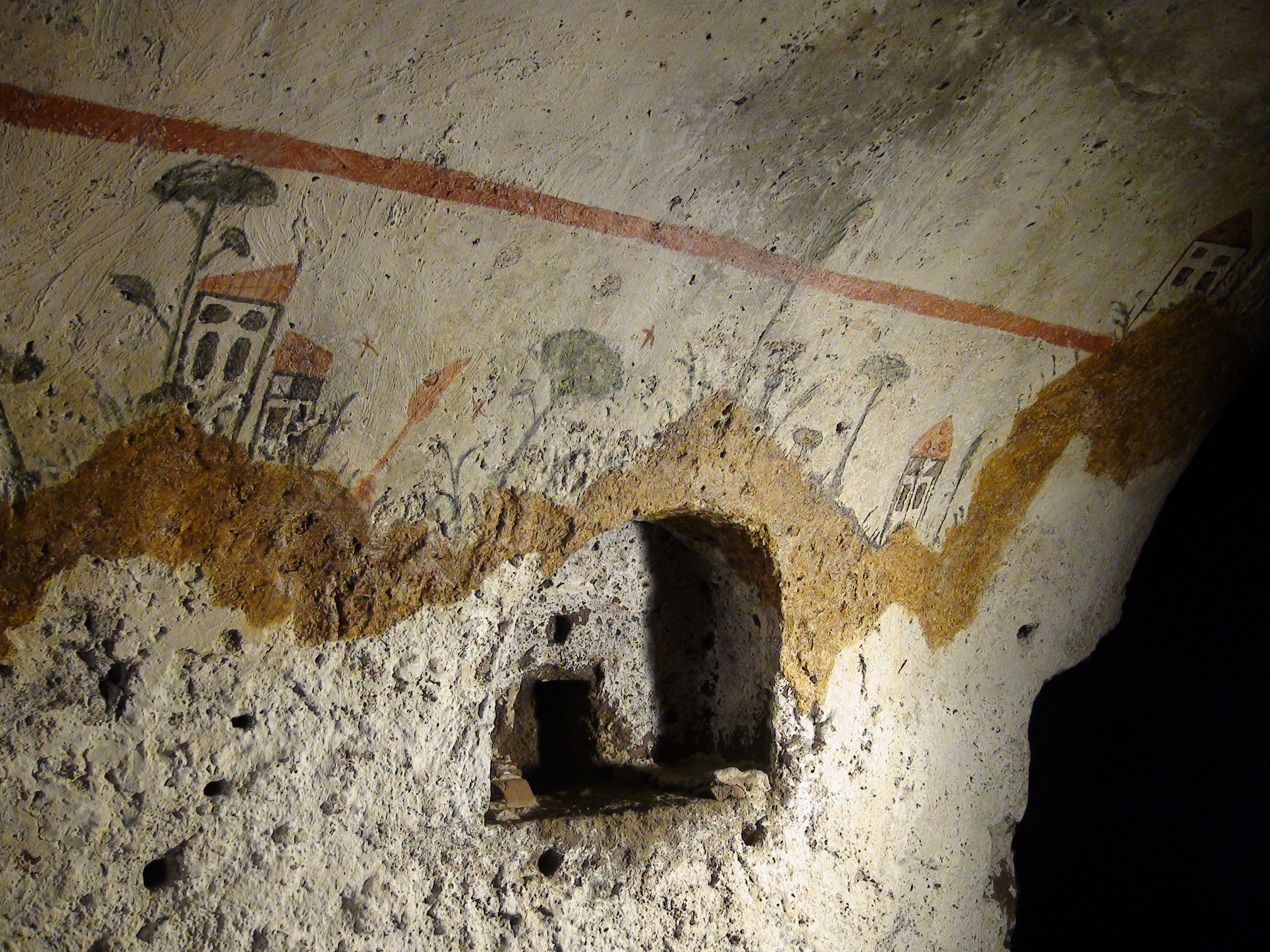
Wall paintings at the reservoir the Carcerati

=== The cistern of the Carcerati ===
As Ventotene has never had an adequate supply of fresh water, several enormous cisterns to collect rainwater were built in Roman times in the central parts of the island. They were excavated in the rock to a depth of approximately 10 m and consist of a system of vaulted roof tunnels, galleries, basins and corridors. One of these, known as the Carcerati (prisoners), can be visited on guided tours. The name derives from the convicts who were sent to the island in the late 18th century to build the present village and were housed in the by then empty reservoir. The walls of the galleries are covered with graffiti, inscriptions and drawings from various centuries, but particularly from the convicts who drew images of houses and nature to remember places they were never to see again.

=== The Archaeological Museum ===
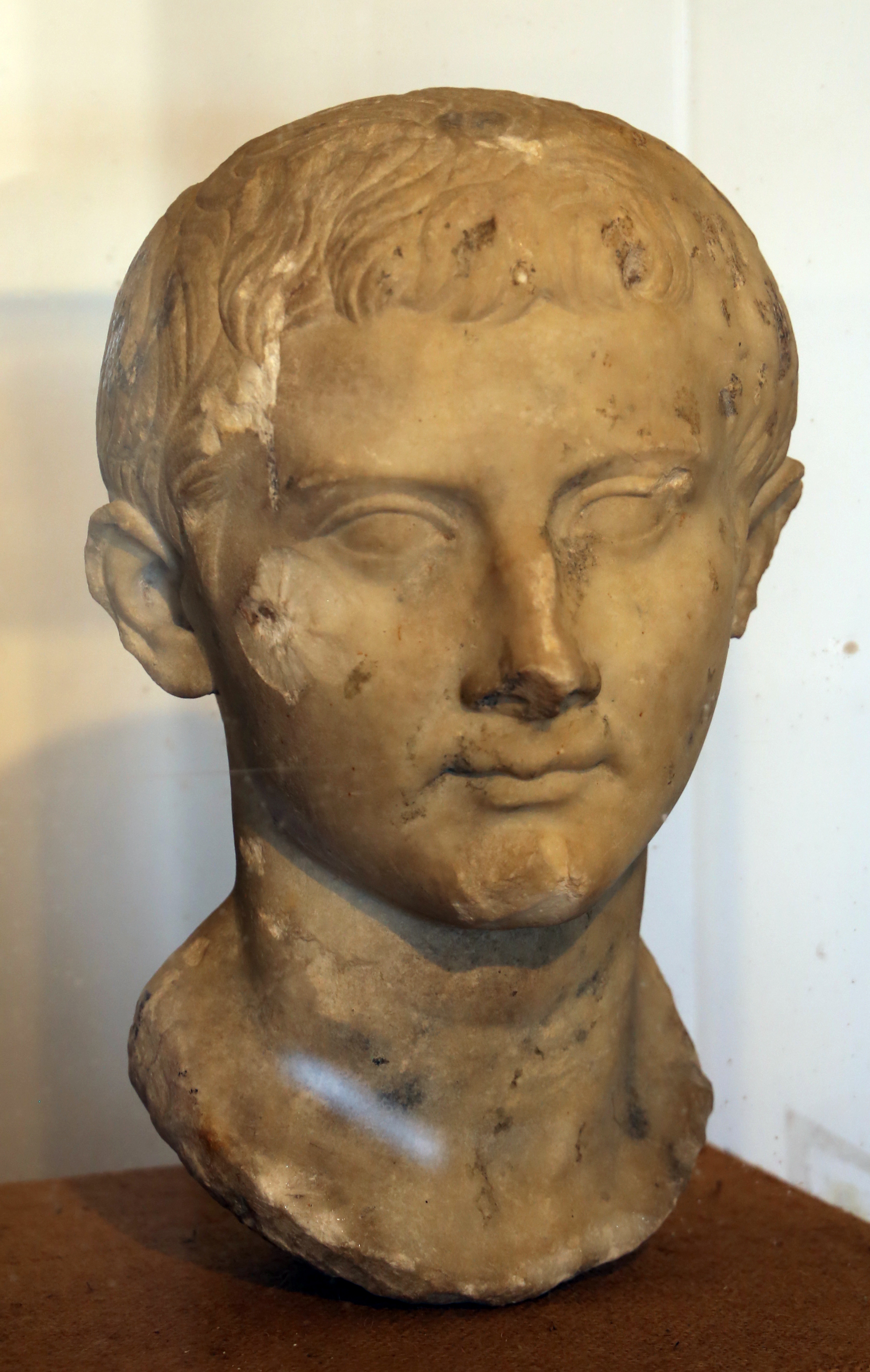
Emperor Tiberius at the Archaeological Museum

The Archaeological Museum of Ventotene is located on the ground floor of the Bourbon castle, seat of the Town Council. It contains finds from the island, the seabed and the wreckages of Roman ships around the island, as well as a large model of the island during the Augustan age with the Imperial residence and connected structures, such as the port and other villas. Unfortunately, all statues from Villa Giulia have disappeared or been sold in indiscriminate plundering over the centuries, and all that remains is a marble head bust of emperor Tiberius, on display in the museum.

In July 2009, archaeologists announced the discovery of a "graveyard" of five ancient Roman ships in the deep waters off Ventotene, with their pristine cargoes of olive oil, garum and metal ingots. One ship carried a full load of a kind of dish called a mortarium, in which foods were ground or mashed. Some of the recovered objects were immediately placed on view at Ventotene.

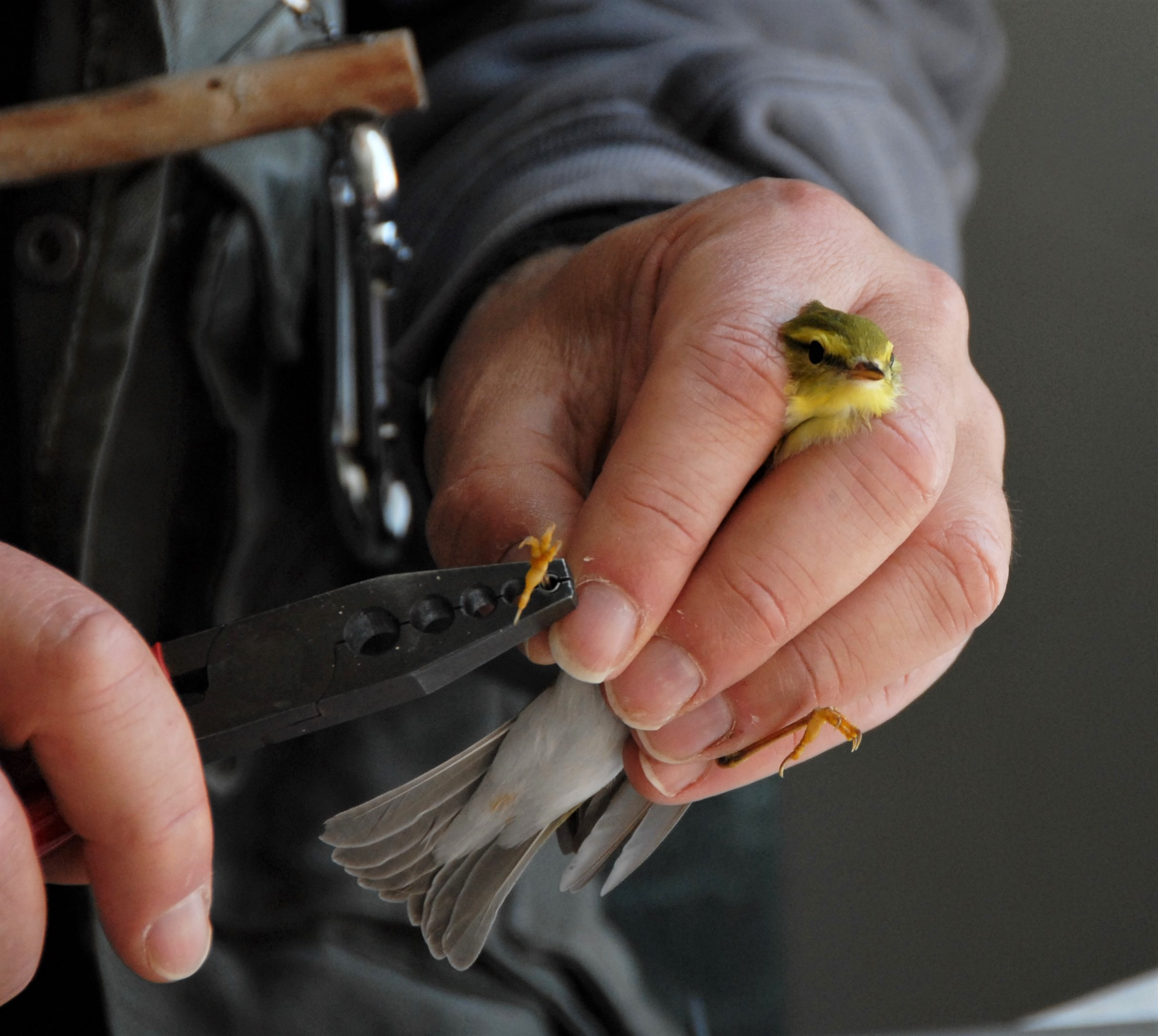
A wood warbler being ringed

=== The Bird Observatory and Migration Museum ===
Italy's only bird migration museum can be found at the high, southern end of the island in a building called Il Semaforo. The information at the museum is based on 20 years of the observatory's research and monitoring, and explains how, where and why birds migrate as they do and the importance of bird ringing. There are real-sized models of many of the species which use Ventotene as a stopover. During the spring and autumn migration, visitors can go along and watch while birds are weighed, measured and ringed.

== Transport ==
The island is connected by a daily ferry and hydrofoil service to Formia provided by the ferry company Laziomar. This is supplemented by summer services to Anzio and Terracina on the mainland, and the nearby island Ponza. During the summer months, SNAV also operates routes between Ventotene and Naples, as well as the island of Ischia.

== Gallery ==
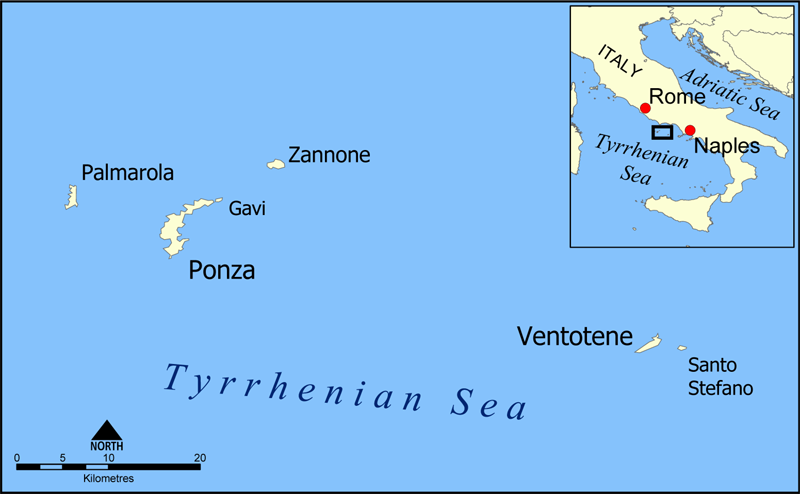
Ventotene and the Pontine Islands

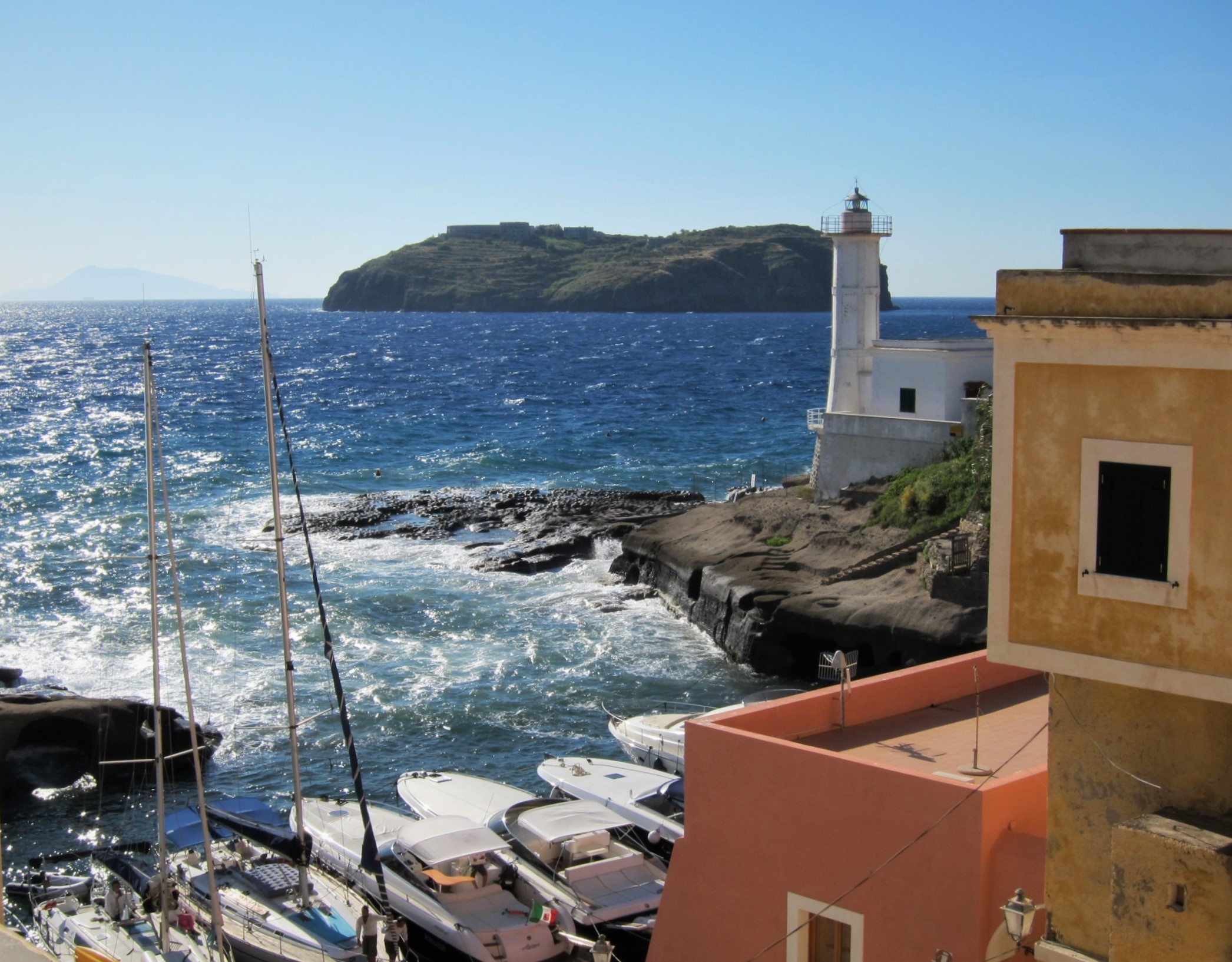
View towards the island of Santo Stefano

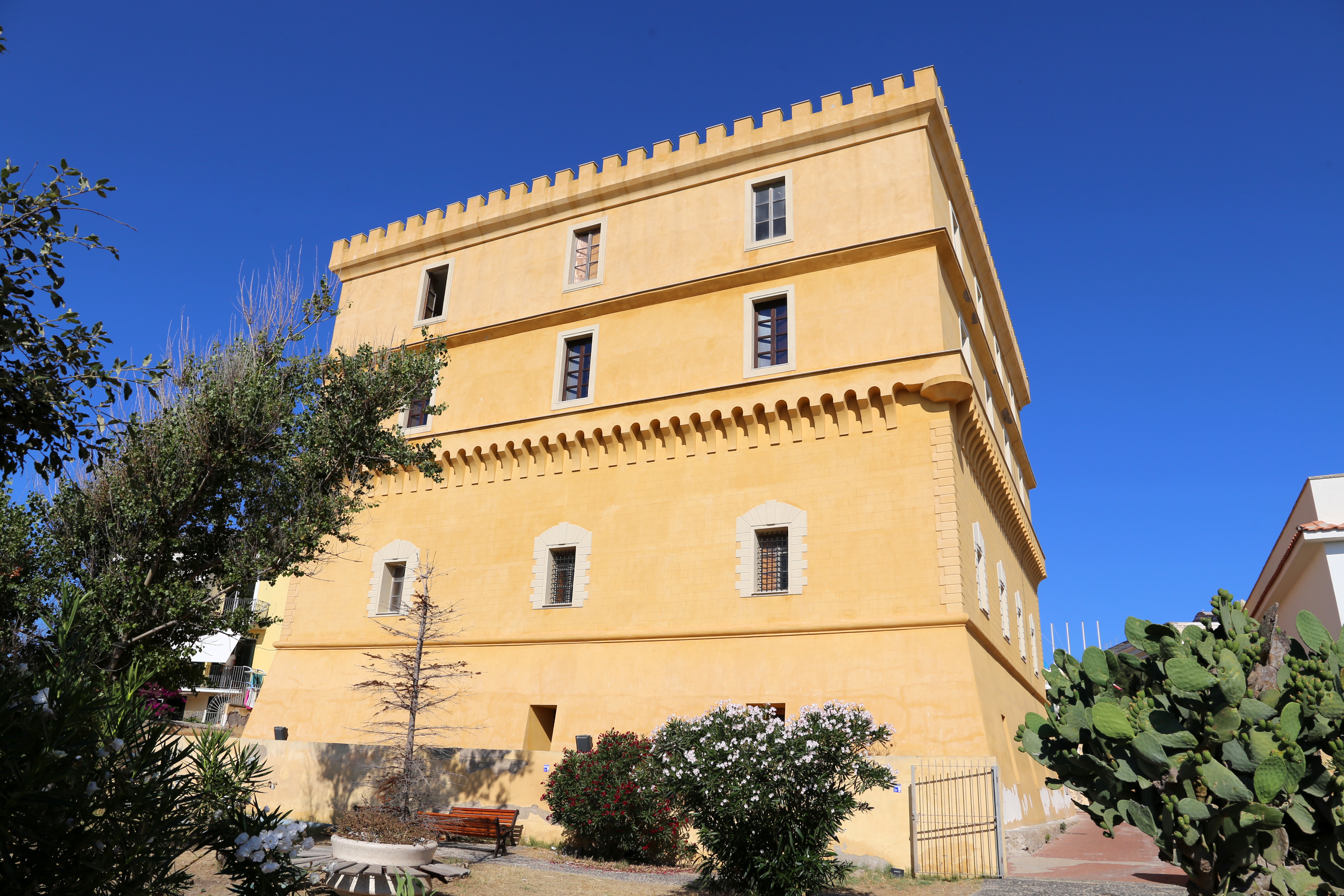
Piazza Castello

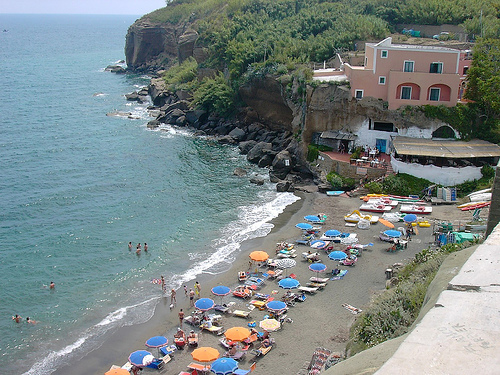
The Cala Nave Beach

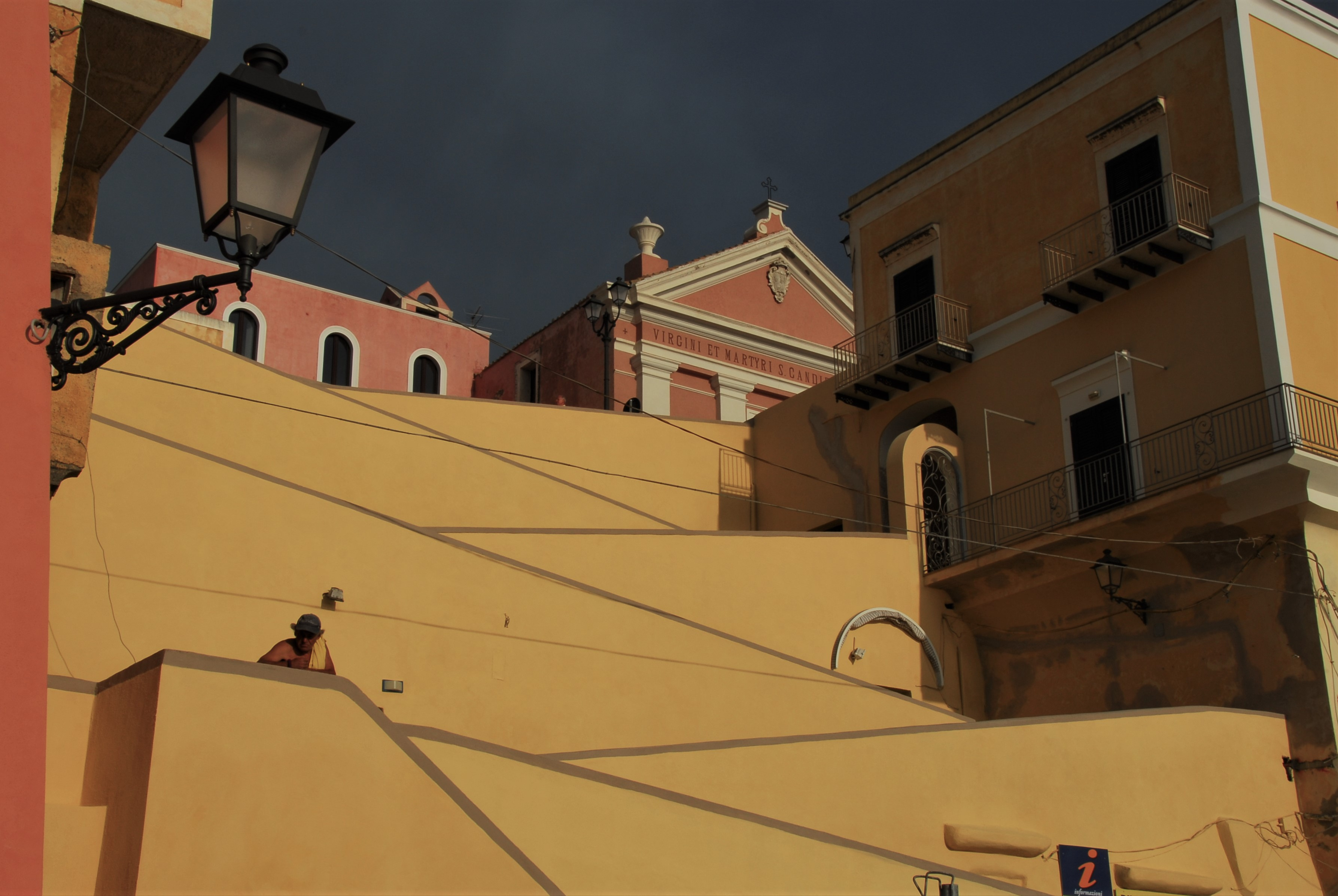
The zig-zag ramp leading from the port to the village

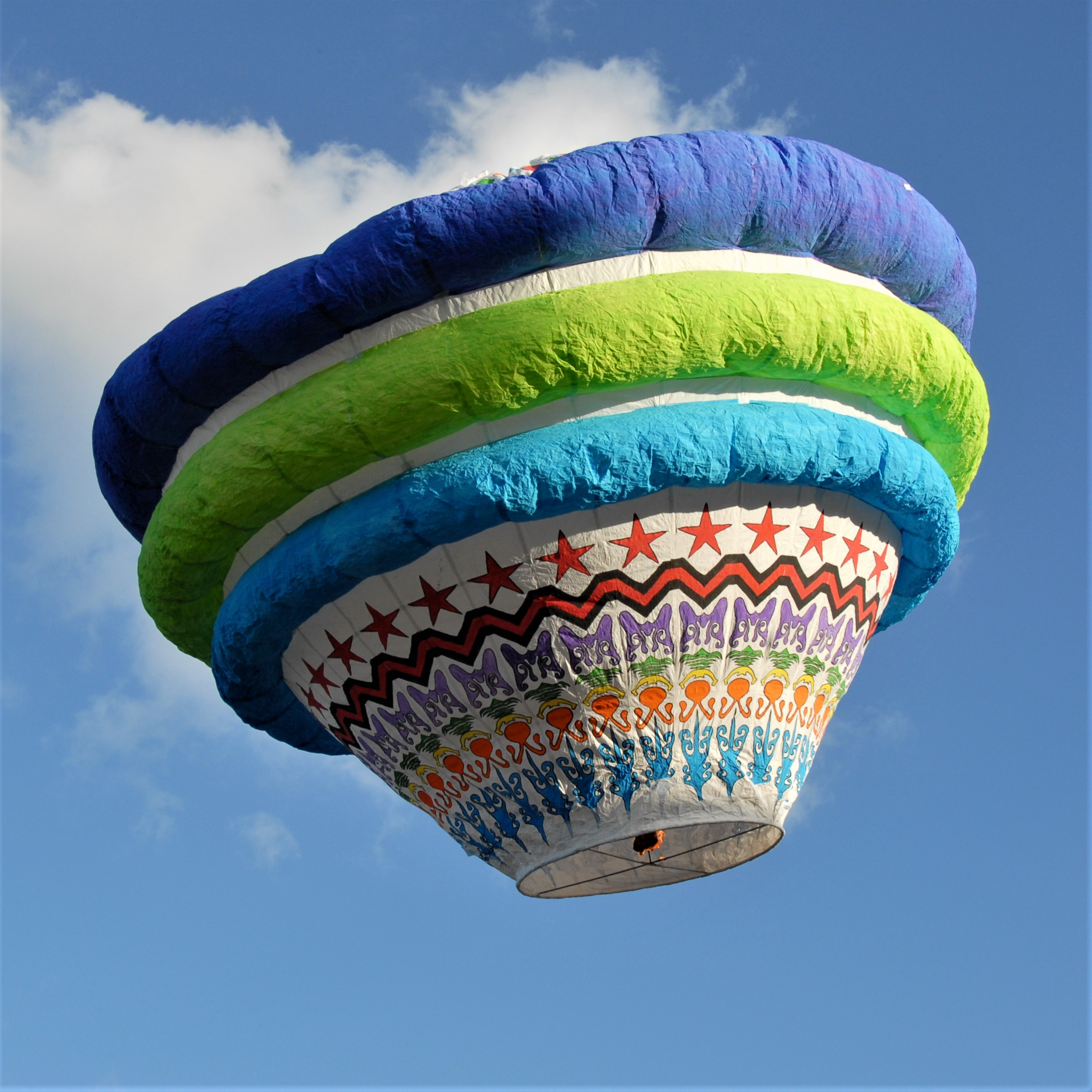
Hot air balloon at the Santa Candida festival

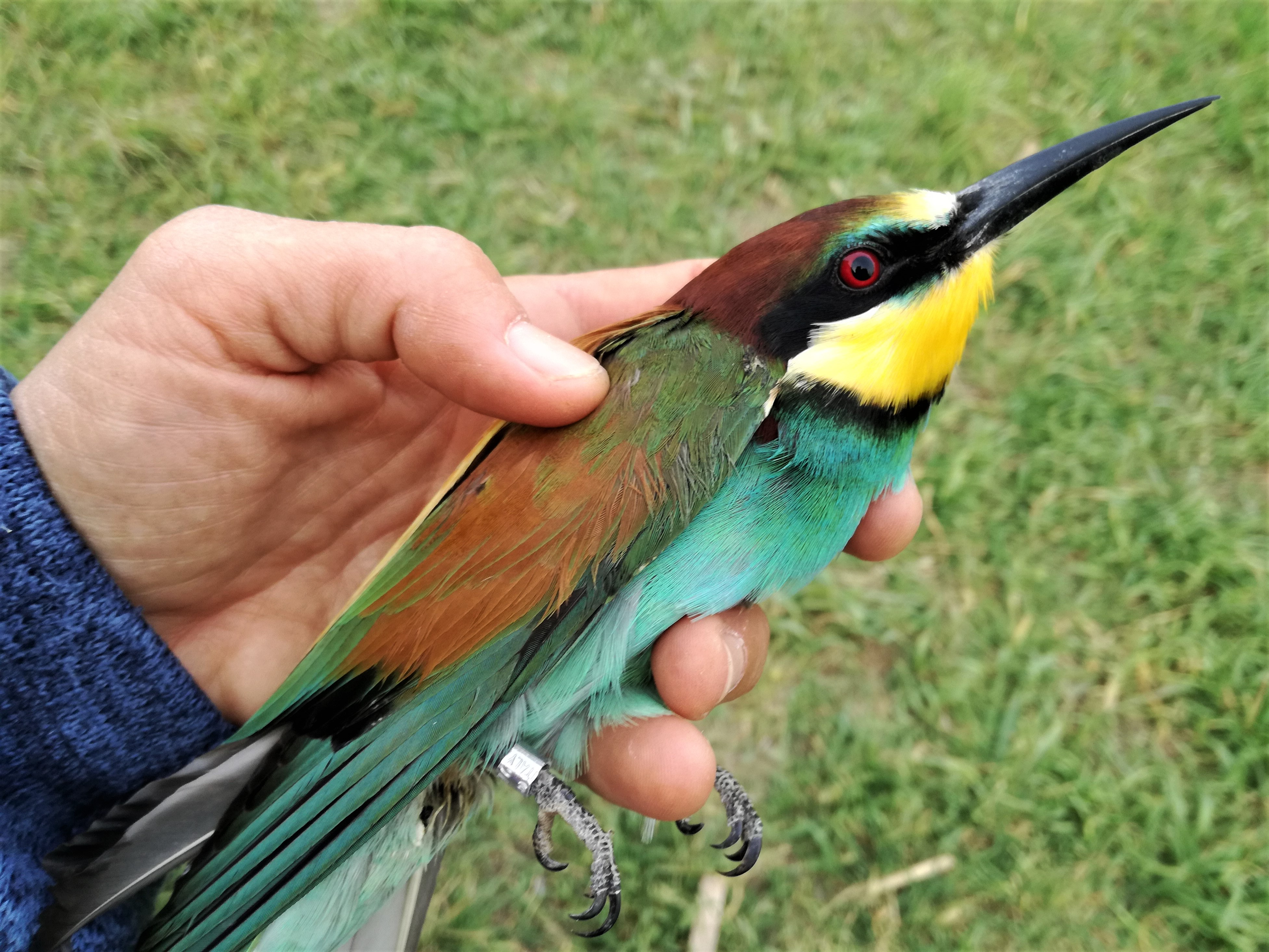
A bee-eater after bird ringing

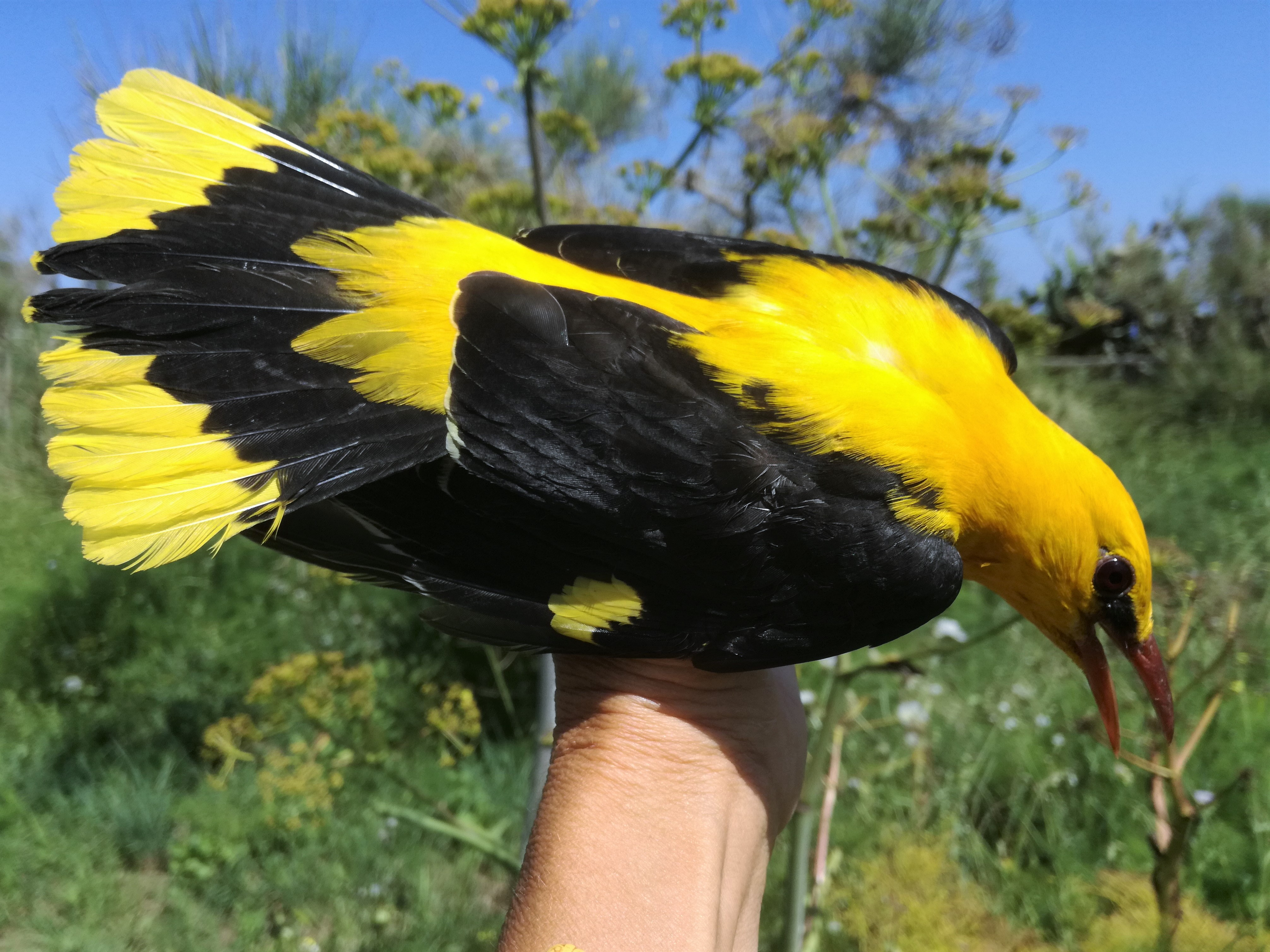
A golden oriole during the spring migration

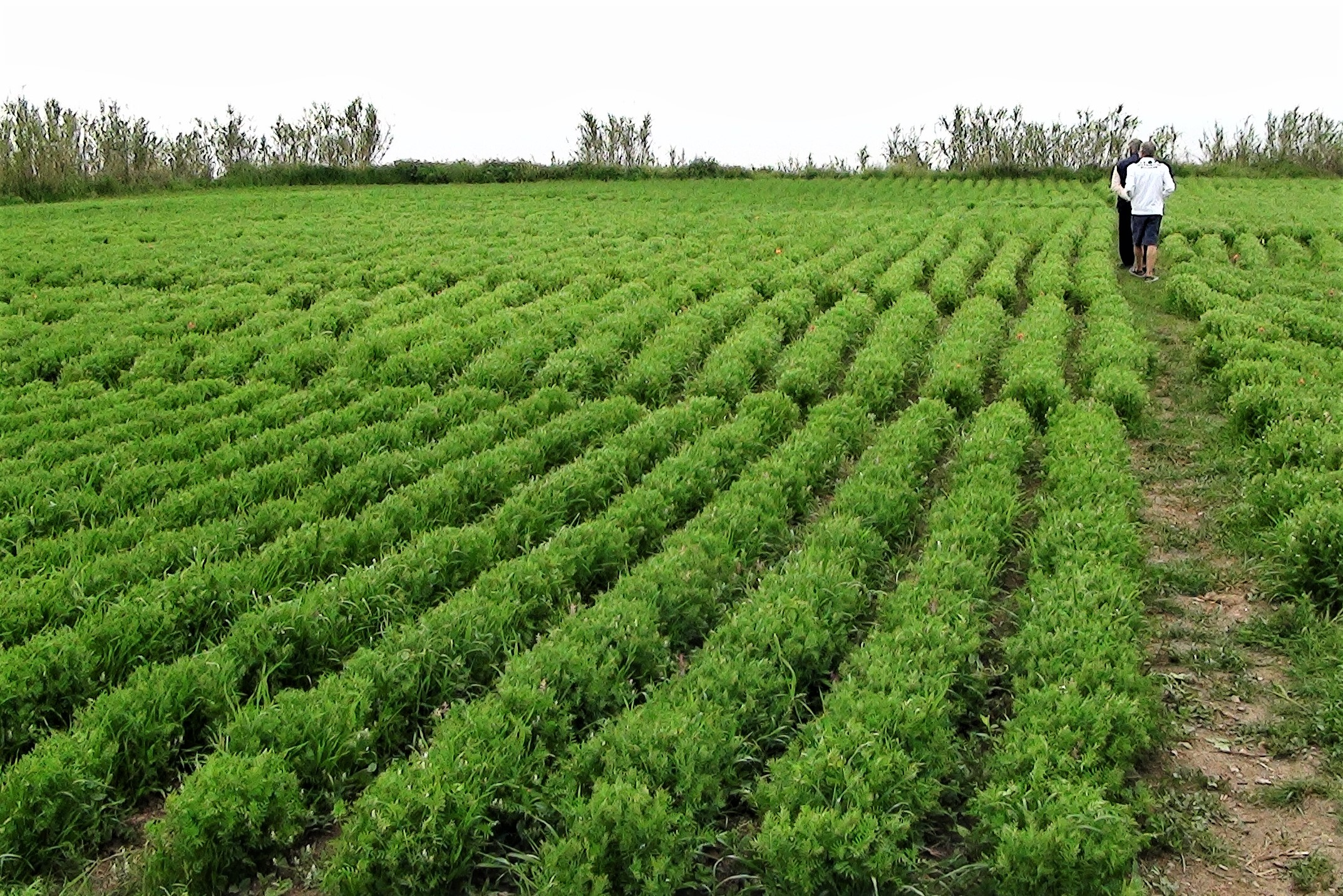
Field of the lentils for which the island is famed

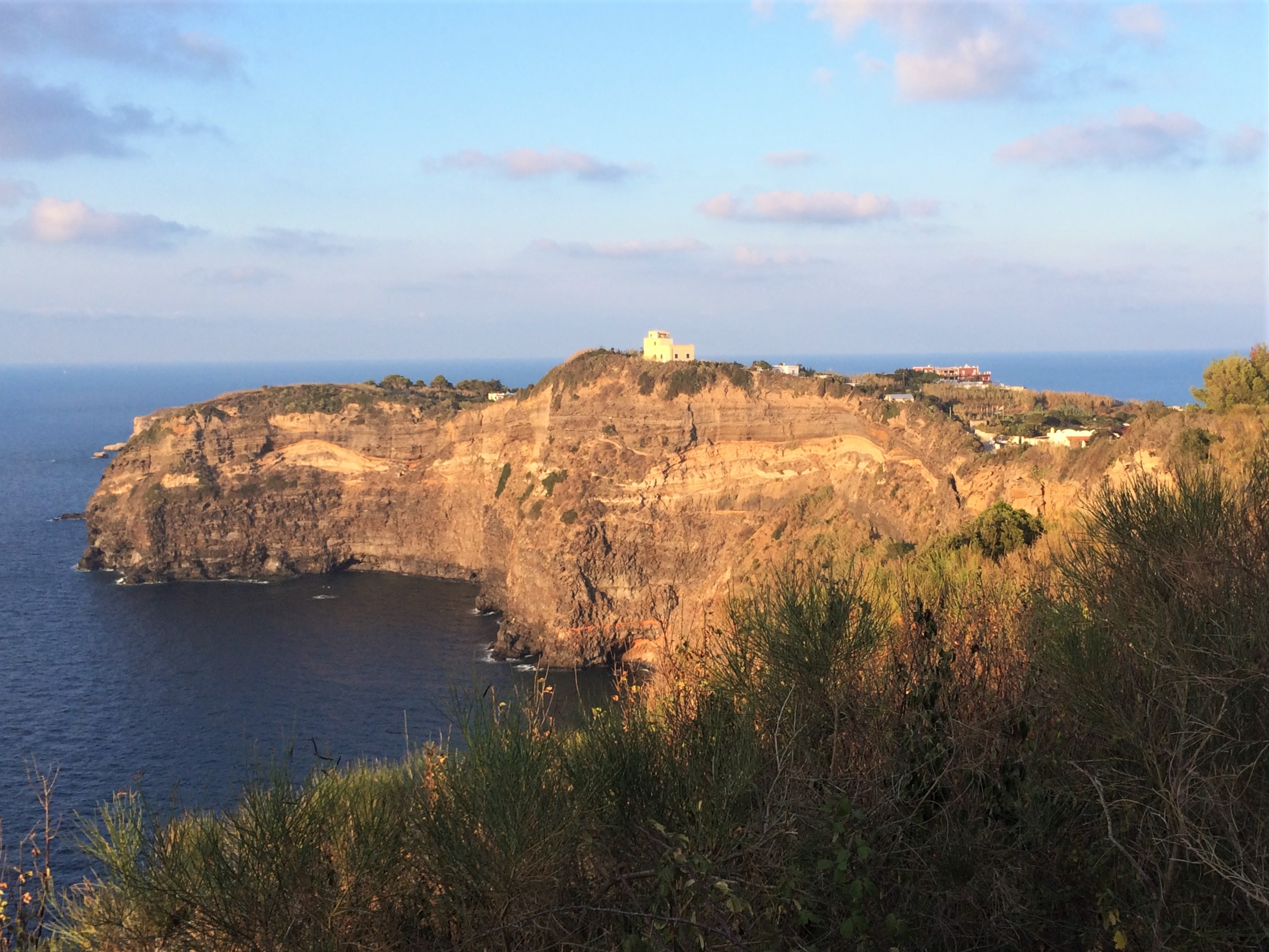
View over Ventotene and the Bird Observatory

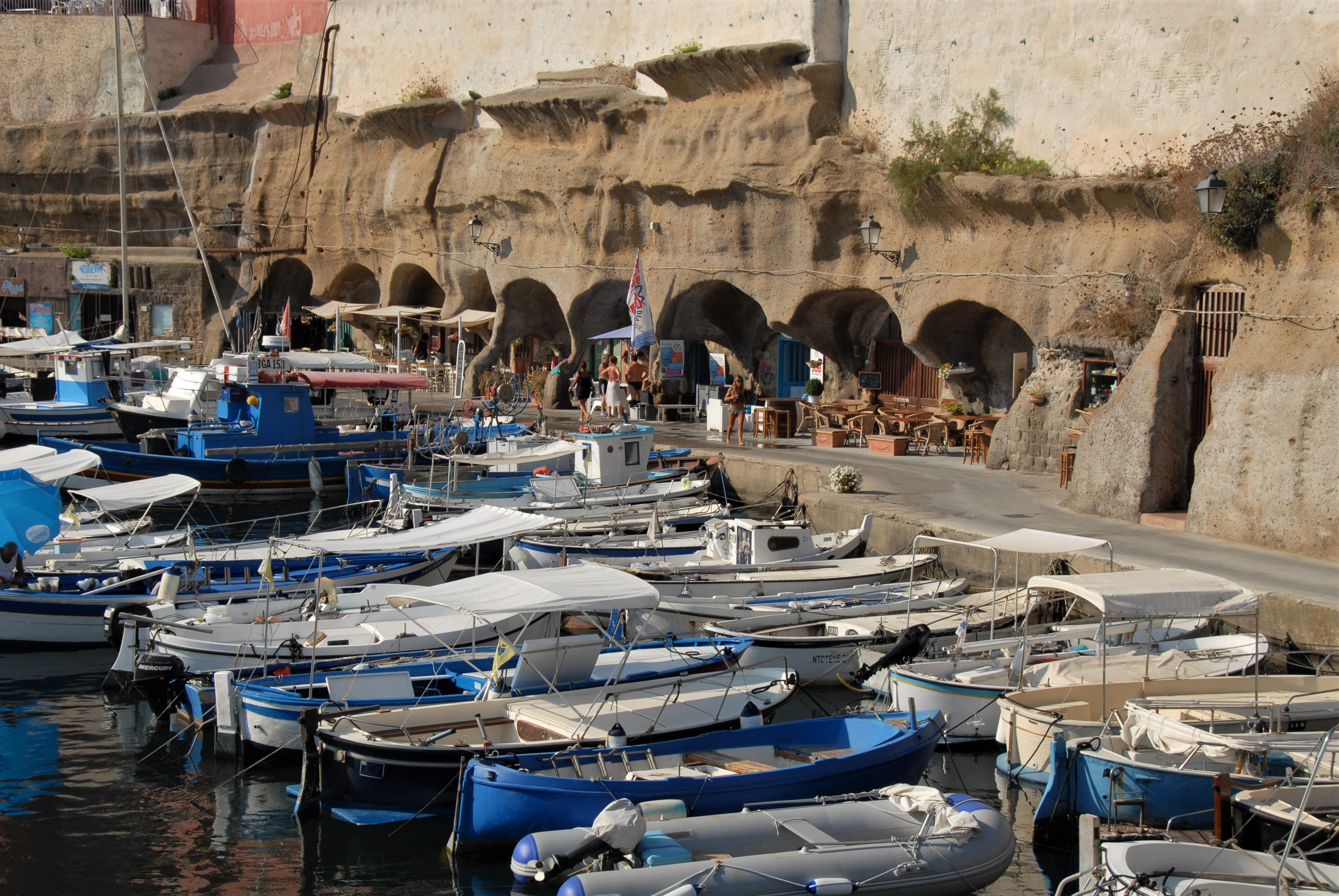
The ancient portico at Porto Romano, the Roman port

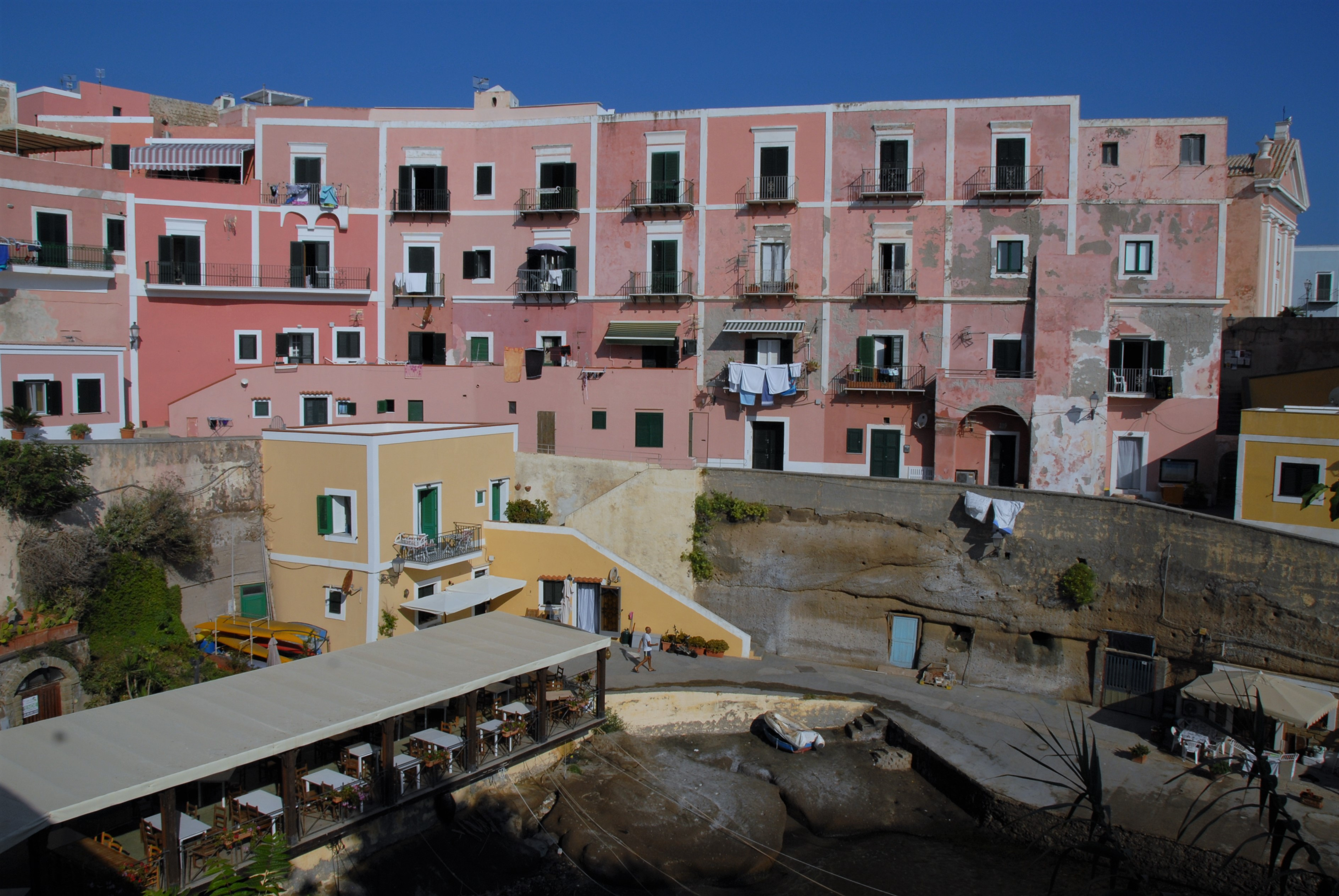
Il Pozillo, part of the Roman port

== See also ==
- List of islands of Italy
- Ventotene Manifesto
- Santo Stefano Island
- Pontine Islands
- Santo Stefano lizard
