= Palmarola =

Italian island

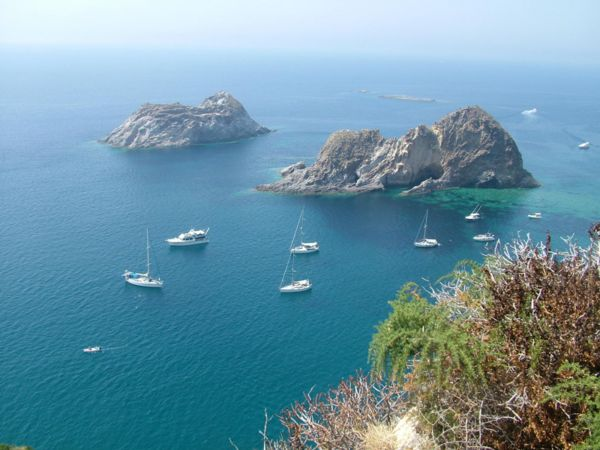

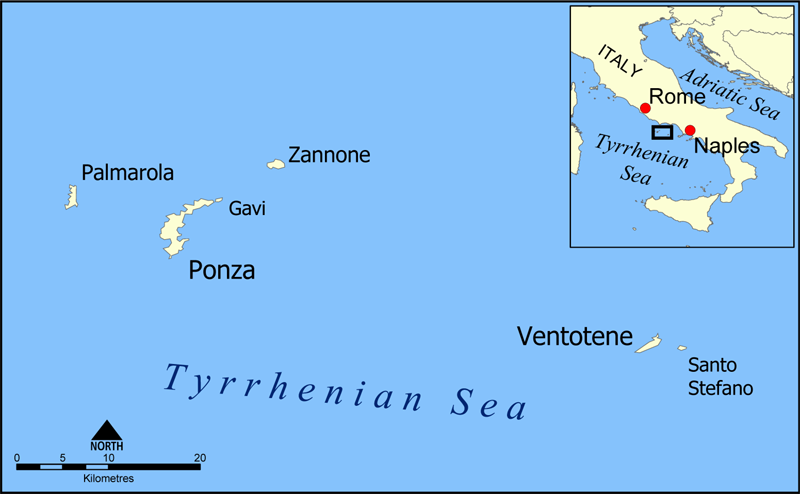
- Palmarola and the Pontine Islands

Geography
- Location: Tyrrhenian Sea
- Coordinates: 40°56′15″N 12°51′27″E
- Archipelago: Pontine Islands

Administration
- Italy

Demographics
- Population: 0

Palmarola is a craggy, mostly uninhabited island in the Tyrrhenian Sea off the west coast of Italy. It is the second-largest of the Pontine Islands and located about 10 kilometres (6.2 mi) west from Ponza. In antiquity it was known as Palmaria.

Palmarola has an extremely rocky coast dotted with natural grottos, bays, cliffs, and crags. The island is primarily a nature reserve, but there are a handful of ports where boats can land and one restaurant that cater to tourists during the summer season. Palmarola has a few small beaches.

The famous French explorer and oceanographer Jacques-Yves Cousteau appointed Palmarola as "The most Beautiful Island in the Mediterranean Sea"

Pope Silverius was exiled to and died on Palmarola in 538.

== Points of interest ==
- San Silverio Shrine, a Christian holy site, access to the site is somewhat difficult.
- Cava Mazzella, a natural cave

== See also ==
- List of islands of Italy
