= Zannone =

Island in the Tyrrhenian Sea

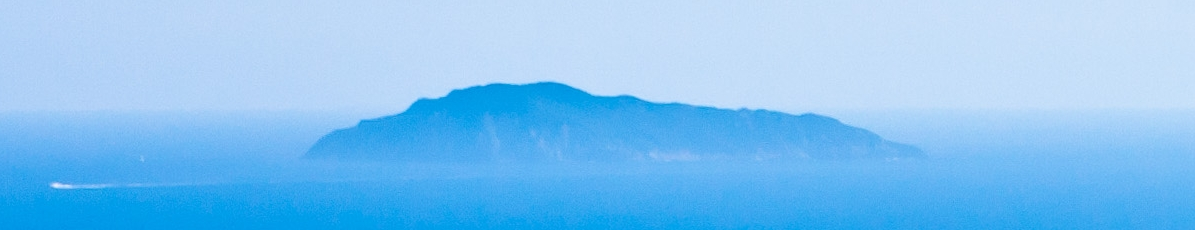
- Zannone viewed from Circeo
- Interactive map of Zannone

Geography
- Coordinates: 40°58′14″N 13°03′18″E
- Adjacent to: Tyrrhenian Sea
- Total islands: 1
- Area: 1 km^{2} (0.39 sq mi)

Administration
- Italy

Demographics
- Population: 0

Zannone (It. for "Big Fang") is an island in the Tyrrhenian Sea off the west coast of Italy. It is part of the Pontine Islands and belongs administratively to the comune of Ponza. The entire island is about 1 square kilometre (0.4 square miles) in size and about 10 km (6 mi) from Ponza island.

The uninhabited island, home to the Punta Varo Lighthouse, is supervised by the State Forestry Corps, which maintains a station and a small educational exhibit on top of Monte Pellegrino, the highest point on the island.

== Fauna and flora ==
Zannone is home to various endemic plant and animal species, preserved throughout the centuries thanks to man's scarce presence. It provides a safe stop for thousands of migratory birds and hosts a species of lizard that only exists there, the Podarcis siculus patrizii. Human settlements on the island date back to prehistory but no humans ever stayed long, because of docking difficulties and pirate incursions. It is the only Pontine island to be made of metamorphic and sedimentary rocks dating back to over two hundred million years ago, as well as of volcanic rocks.

It is part of the Circeo National Park, because of its beauty and several rare biomes.

== History ==
In ancient times, the island was frequented by the Greeks, as well as by the Romans who called it Sinonia.

On the island there are the ruins of a Cistercian convent dating back to the 13th century AD.

Zannone was visited in 1785 by Sir William Hamilton who described in detail his voyage there in a letter to Sir Joseph Banks.

Built on top of a hill is a colonial-style villa, now in ruins, the home of Marquis Casati Stampa and his wife Anna Fallarino, who were hosting orgies on the island, in the 1960s. At the time, many yachts and motorboats would land during weekends as dukes, barons, countesses, VIPs, and billionaires would drop by Zannone's famous couple.

The island was used historically as a private hunting reserve by members of the Italian aristocracy, who populated it with mouflon wild sheep, now a protected species.

== Access ==
Zannone has no tourist facilities. Visitors have free access to the island and its beaches, though camping or overnight stays by the general public are prohibited. Biologists, scientists, and birdwatchers are usually granted permission to camp there overnight.

== See also ==
- List of islands of Italy
