= Pontine Islands =

Archipelago in the Tyrrhenian Sea off Lazio, Italy

Coordinates: 40°53′5″N 13°9′15″E

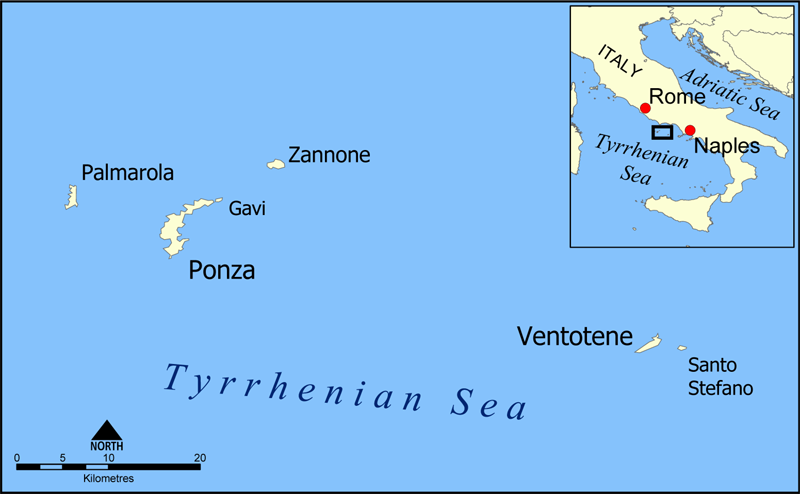
The Pontine Islands.

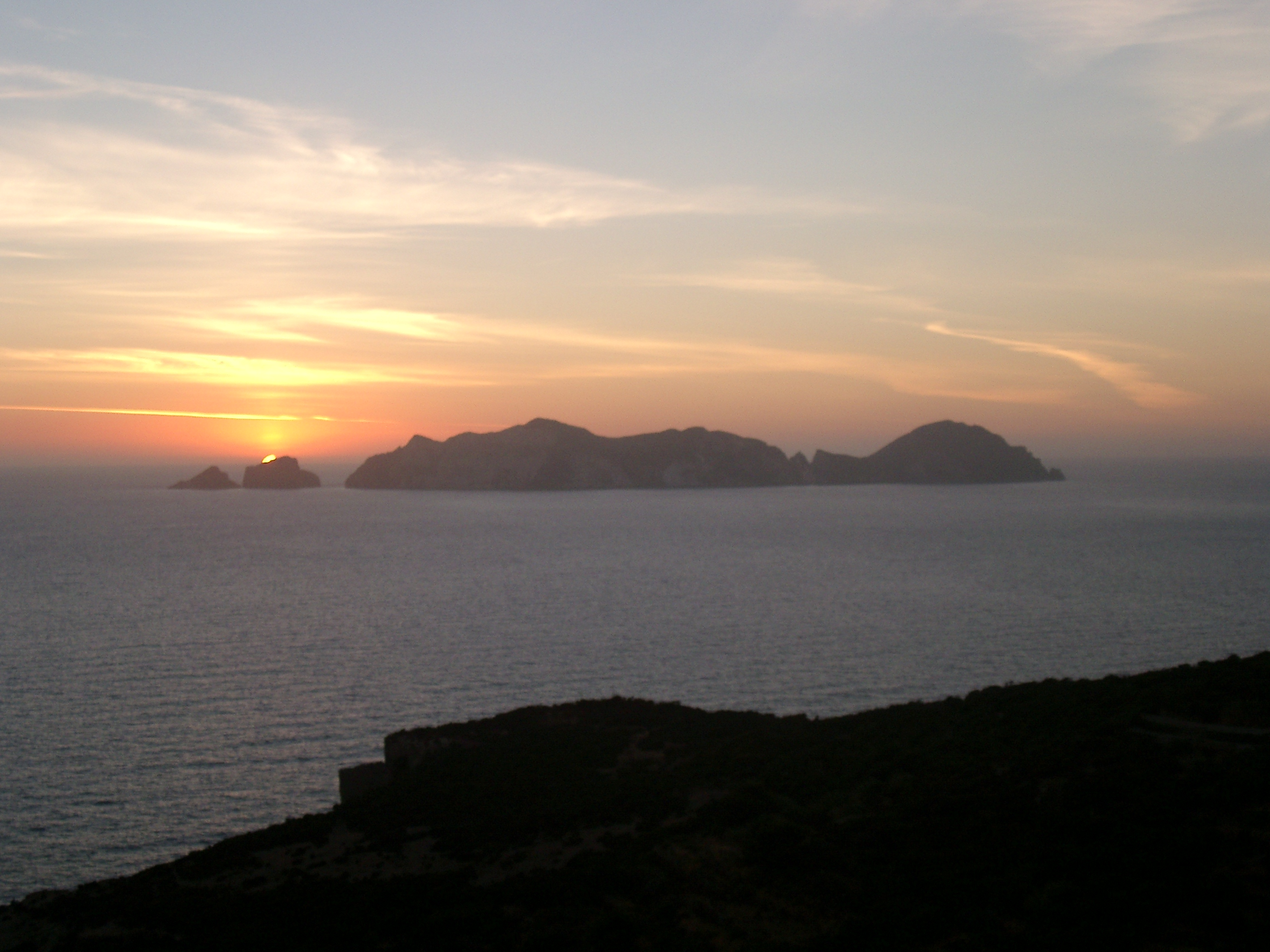
Palmarola.

The Pontine Islands (/ˈpɒntaɪn/, also US: /ˈpɒntiːn/; Italian: Isole Ponziane [ˈiːzole ponˈtsjaːne]) are an archipelago in the Tyrrhenian Sea off the coast of Lazio region, Italy. The islands were collectively named after the largest island in the group, Ponza. The other islands in the archipelago are Palmarola, Zannone, and Gavi to the northwest and Ventotene and Santo Stefano to the southeast. These two groups are separated by 22 nautical miles (41 km). From Sabaudia-Cape Circeo peninsula to Zannone the distance is 12 nautical miles (22 km), while Ventotene faces Gaeta (21 miles). The minimum distance between Santo Stefano and the isle of Ischia is 22 nautical miles (41 km). In ancient times they were called Pontiae (Πόντιαι).

The archipelago is volcanic and has been inhabited for thousands of years. Neolithic artefacts and Bronze Age obsidians have been excavated on the islands. The islands were used by the Etruscans who carved the "Blue Grottos". The earliest recorded history of the islands occurs with the Roman victory over the Volsci at 338 BC. According to a local legend, this was once the lost Kingdom of Tyrrhenia which sank with a narrow strip connected to mainland Italy.

During the reign of Augustus, residential expansion on the islands was encouraged and people spread from Ponza to Ventotene. Rome used the two islands as a retreat and a place to exile politically troubling citizens. Some two thousand years later the islands were used for the same reason by the Fascist regime. Agrippina the Younger, mother to the future Roman emperor, Nero, was exiled to the Pontine Islands by her brother, the then Roman emperor, Caligula, in 39 AD, before having the exile lifted by her uncle, the emperor Claudius upon his succession. Deposed Pope Silverius was exiled there in 537 shortly before his death.

The Pontine were abandoned during the Middle Ages after raids by Saracens and pirates. During the 18th century, the Kingdom of Naples re-colonized the islands, and they later became part of the Kingdom of Italy.

Ponza and Ventotene are populated, but the smaller islands are not, with the total population of the archipelago at 4,066 inhabitants as of 2009. Ventotene and Santo Stefano are land and sea conservation areas supervised by the Italian State.

Currently, tiny vineyards, wild herbs and flowers, and secluded beaches and grottos make them a popular tourist destination.

== See also ==
- List of islands of Italy
