= List of Ramsar sites in Italy =

The Ramsar Convention on Wetlands of International Importance Especially as Waterfowl Habitat is an international treaty for the conservation and sustainable use of wetlands. Adopted in 1971, it entered into force in 1975 and, as of February 2026, there are 172 contracting parties. In Italy, as enacted by DPR 13 marzo 1976, n. 448 (and the subsequent DPR 11 febbraio 1987, n. 184), there are 63 Ramsar sites as of February 2026, with a total surface area of 810.91 square kilometres (313.09 sq mi).

== Designated sites ==
Name	Region	Area	Designated	Image	Park status	Coords.	Ref.
Trapani and Paceco salt ponds	Sicily	971 ha	2017-10-19		N/A	37°59′N 12°30′E	
Torbiere d'Iseo [it]	Lombardy	325 ha	1984-12-05		N/A	45°39′N 10°01′E	
Valle Bertuzzi [it]	Emilia-Romagna	3,100 ha	1981-09-04		Regional Park	44°46′N 12°13′E	
Valle Cavanata	Friuli-Venezia Giulia	243 ha	1978-03-10		N/A	45°43′N 13°28′E	
Valle di Gorino [it]	Emilia-Romagna	1,330 ha	1981-09-04		Regional Park	44°48′N 12°21′E	
Valli del Mincio [it]	Lombardy	1,082 ha	1984-12-05		N/A	45°10′N 10°42′E	
Valli residue del comprensorio di Comacchio	Emilia-Romagna	13,500 ha	1981-09-04		Po Delta Regional Park [it]	44°37′N 12°11′E	
Vendicari	Sicily	1,450 ha	1989-04-11		N/A	36°48′N 15°06′E	
Punte Alberete [it]	Emilia-Romagna	480 ha	1976-12-14		Po Delta Regional Park [it]	44°30′N 12°13′E	
Palude di Bolgheri [it]	Tuscany	518 ha	1976-12-14		N/A	43°13′N 10°33′E	
Stagno di Molentargius [it]	Sardinia	1,401 ha	1976-12-14		Molentargius - Saline Regional Park	39°13′N 09°10′E	
Laguna di Orbetello	Tuscany	887 ha	1976-12-14		N/A	42°28′N 11°12′E	
Lake Barrea	Abruzzo	241.4 ha	1976-12-14		Abruzzo, Lazio and Molise National Park	41°45′N 13°58′E	
Busatello marsh [ro]	Veneto	443 ha	2017-10-03		N/A	37°59′N 12°30′E	
Massaciuccoli lake and marsh	Tuscany	11,135 ha	2017-06-22		N/A	43°45′N 10°18′E	
Oasis of the Sele – Serre Persano [it]	Campania	174 ha	2003-08-07		N/A	40°36′N 15°08′E	
Posada River Mouth [it]	Sardinia	736 ha	2021-02-25		N/A	40°38′N 09°43′E	
Oasis of Castelvolturno – Variconi [it]	Campania	195 ha	2003-08-07		N/A	41°01′N 13°56′E	
Biviere di Gela [it]	Sicily	256 ha	1988-04-12		N/A	37°00′N 14°20′E	
Isola Boscone [it]	Lombardy	201 ha	1989-04-11		N/A	45°01′N 11°13′E	
Lago di Caprolace	Lazio	229 ha	1976-12-14		Circeo National Park	41°21′N 12°58′E	
Lago dei Monaci	Lazio	94 ha	1976-12-14		Circeo National Park	41°22′N 12°55′E	
Lago di Sabaudia	Lazio	1,474 ha	1976-12-14		Circeo National Park	41°15′N 13°03′E	
Lago di Tovel	Trentino Alto Adige	37 ha	1980-09-19		N/A	46°15′N 10°57′E	
Laguna di Marano: Foci dello Stella [it]	Friuli-Venezia Giulia	1,400 ha	1979-05-14		N/A	45°44′N 13°06′E	
Laguna di Venezia: Valle Averto [it]	Veneto	500 ha	1989-04-11		N/A	45°21′N 12°09′E	
Le Cesine	Apulia	620 ha	1977-12-06		N/A	40°21′N 18°19′E	
Ortazzo e Ortazzino [it]	Emilia-Romagna	440 ha	1981-09-04		Po Delta Regional Park [it]	44°21′N 12°18′E	
Palude Brabbia [it]	Lombardy	459 ha	1985-12-05		N/A	41°24′N 12°54′E	
Palude del Brusà [it] - Le Vallette	Veneto	171 ha	2010-09-27		N/A	45°10′N 11°13′E	
Palude della Diaccia Botrona	Tuscany	2,500 ha	1991-05-22		N/A	42°46′N 10°55′E	
Piallassa della Baiona e Risega [it]	Emilia-Romagna	1,630 ha	1981-09-04		Po Delta Regional Park [it]	44°30′N 12°15′E	
Palude di Ostiglia [it]	Lombardy	123 ha	1984-12-05		N/A	45°06′N 11°06′E	
Pian di Spagna - Lago di Mezzola	Lombardy	1,740 ha	1976-12-14		N/A	46°10′N 09°25′E	
Saline di Cervia [it]	Emilia-Romagna	785 ha	1981-09-04		Regional Park	44°15′N 12°20′E	
Stagno di Mistras [it]	Sardinia	680 ha	1982-05-03		N/A	39°54′N 08°27′E	
Sacca di Bellocchio [it]	Emilia-Romagna	223 ha	1976-12-14		Po Delta Regional Park [it]	44°37′N 12°16′E	
Stagno di Cagliari	Sardinia	3,466 ha	1976-12-14		N/A	39°12′N 09°03′E	
Valle Santa [it]	Emilia-Romagna	261 ha	1976-12-14		Po Delta Regional Park [it]	44°34′N 11°50′E	
Torre Guaceto [it]	Apulia	940 ha	1981-07-21		N/A	40°43′N 17°48′E	
Valle Campotto e Bassarone [it]	Emilia-Romagna	1,363 ha	1979-03-28		Po Delta Regional Park [it]	44°35′N 11°50′E	
Trappola marshland – Ombrone River mouth	Tuscany	536 ha	2016-10-13		Maremma Regional Park	42°40′N 11°01′E	
Lago di Fogliano [it]	Lazio	395 ha	1976-12-14		Circeo National Park	41°24′N 12°54′E	
Stagno di Cábras [it]	Sardinia	3,575 ha	1979-03-28		N/A	39°57′N 03°30′E	
Stagno di S'Ena Arrubia [it]	Sardinia	223 ha	1976-12-14		N/A	39°49′N 08°33′E	
Lago di Nazzano [it]	Lazio	265 ha	1976-12-14		N/A	42°13′N 12°37′E	
Lago di San Giuliano	Basilicata	2,118 ha	2003-08-07		N/A	40°37′N 16°28′E	
Bacino dell'Angitola	Calabria	875 ha	1989-04-11		N/A	38°44′N 16°14′E	
Saline di Margherita di Savoia	Apulia	3,871 ha	1979-08-02		N/A	41°24′N 16°03′E	
Palude di Colfiorito [it]	Umbria	157 ha	1976-12-14		Colfiorito Regional Park [it]	43°00′N 12°52′E	
Stagno di Corru S'Ittiri [it], Stagni di San Giovanni [it] e Marceddì [it]	Sardinia	2,610 ha	1979-03-28		N/A	39°44′N 08°30′E	
Stagno di Pauli Maiori [it]	Sardinia	287 ha	1979-03-28		N/A	39°52′N 08°37′E	
Stagno di Sale Porcus [it]	Sardinia	330 ha	1982-05-03		N/A	40°00′N 08°25′E	
Vincheto di Cellarda [it]	Veneto	99 ha	1976-12-14		N/A	46°00′N 11°58′E	
Pantano di Pignola [it]	Basilicata	172 ha	2003-08-07		N/A	40°34′N 15°43′E	
Lagustelli di Percile [it]	Lazio	256 ha	2008-08-27		Monti Lucretili Regional Park	42°06′N 12°55′E	
Lago di Burano	Tuscany	410 ha	1976-12-14		N/A	42°24′N 11°22′E	
Foce dell'Isonzo [it] – Isola della Cona [ro]	Friuli-Venezia Giulia	2,340 ha	2018-07-10		N/A	45°45′N 13°31′E	
Padule Orti-Bottagone [it]	Tuscany	151 ha	2013-10-21		N/A	42°58′N 10°36′E	
Ex Lago e Padule di Bientina [it]	Tuscany	1,784 ha	2013-10-21		N/A	43°47′N 10°38′E	
Lago di Sibolla	Tuscany	128 ha	2013-10-21		N/A	43°49′N 10°42′E	
Padule di Fucecchio [it]	Tuscany	2,500 ha	2013-10-21		N/A	43°48′N 10°48′E	
Padule di Scarlino	Tuscany	206 ha	2013-10-21		N/A	42°54′N 10°48′E	

== See also ==
- Ramsar Convention
- List of Ramsar sites worldwide
- List of national parks of Italy
