= Ad Turres =

Ad Turres was the name of several different places in antiquity:

- Ad Turres (Bruttium), a town of Bruttium
- Ad Turres (Byzacena), a town of Byzacena
- Ad Turres (Liburnia), a town of Liburnia; now Crikvenica, Croatia
- Ad Turres (Etruria), a town of Etruria
- Ad Turres, a town of Illyria; now Tasovčići, near Čapljina, Bosnia and Hercegovina
- Ad Turres (Latium), a town of Latium; on the coast near or at San Felice Circeo
- Ad Turres Albas, a town of Latium

== See also ==
- Turres, the name in antiquity of Pirot, Serbia, a town between Naissus and Serdica
- Turres, a character in Dragon Ball
