= Fossellone Cave =

Sea cave in San Felice Circeo, Italy

- Grotta del Fossellone
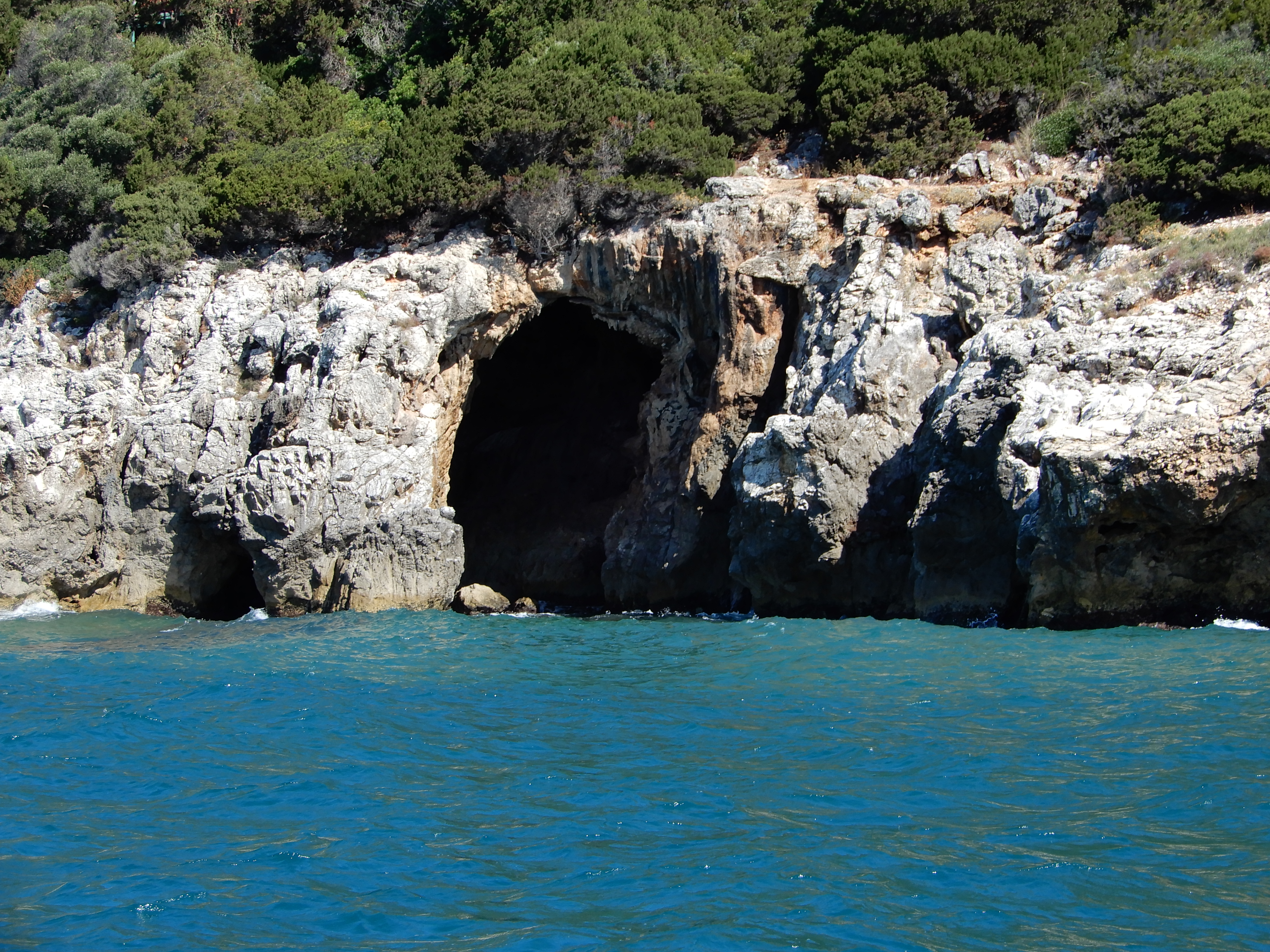
- View of the cave

- Location within Italy
- Location: San Felice Circeo, Italy
- Coordinates: 41°13′25.52″N 13°04′47.06″E
- Access: Public

The Fossellone Cave (Italian: Grotta del Fossellone) is a sea cave located in San Felice Circeo, Italy.

== Location ==
The cave is located along the coast on the southern side of Mount Circeo in the comune of San Felice Circeo. Situated a few dozen meters west of the Impiso Cave, it can be accessed both by sea and by land via a footpath.

== Description ==
It is so called because of its large circular opening, clearly visible from the sea, which was formed by the partial collapse of the vault. It consists of a central chamber and several smaller lateral chambers.

== Archeological discoveries ==
The cave holds archaeological significance because of the discoveries made there which have been crucial for understanding prehistoric human occupation in the region, and especially that of the Neanderthals who populated the area during the Paleolithic period. The first systematic investigations began in 1937 under the direction of Alberto Carlo Blanc, with the participation of internationally renowned scholars such as Henri Breuil and Hugo Obermaier. Excavation activities were interrupted during World War II, resumed in 1947, and continued for several years, revealing a complex and well-preserved stratigraphy that documents multiple phases of human occupation.

== Gallery ==
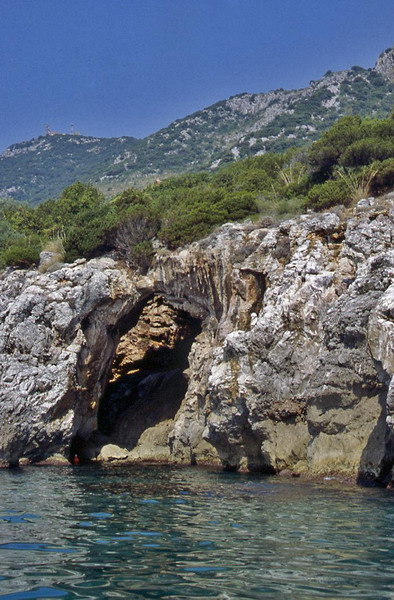

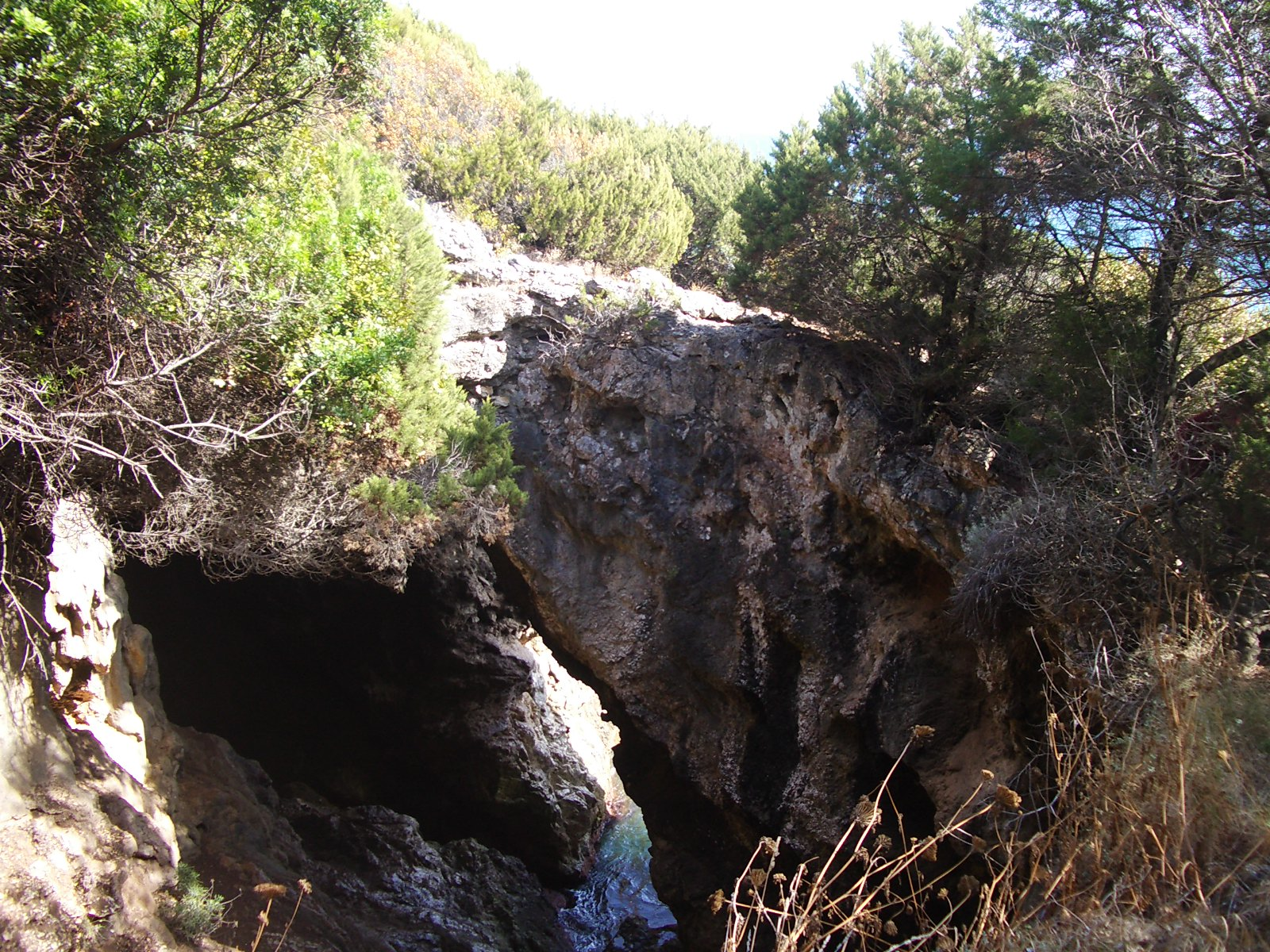

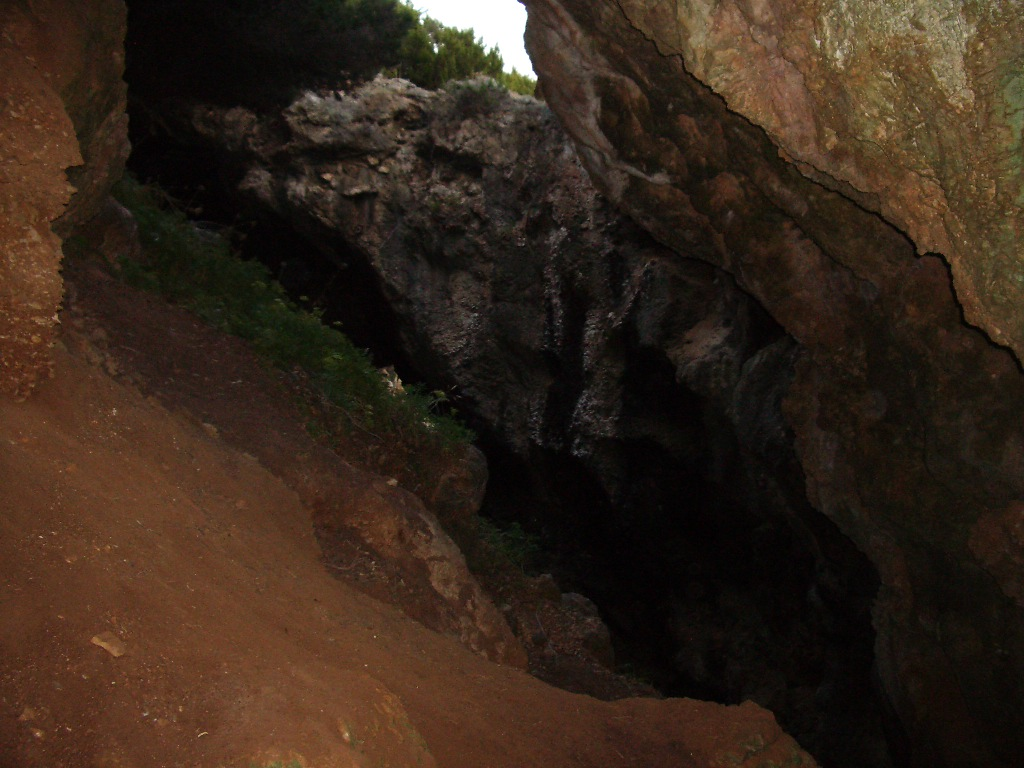

== See also ==
- List of caves in Italy
