= Villa Aguet =

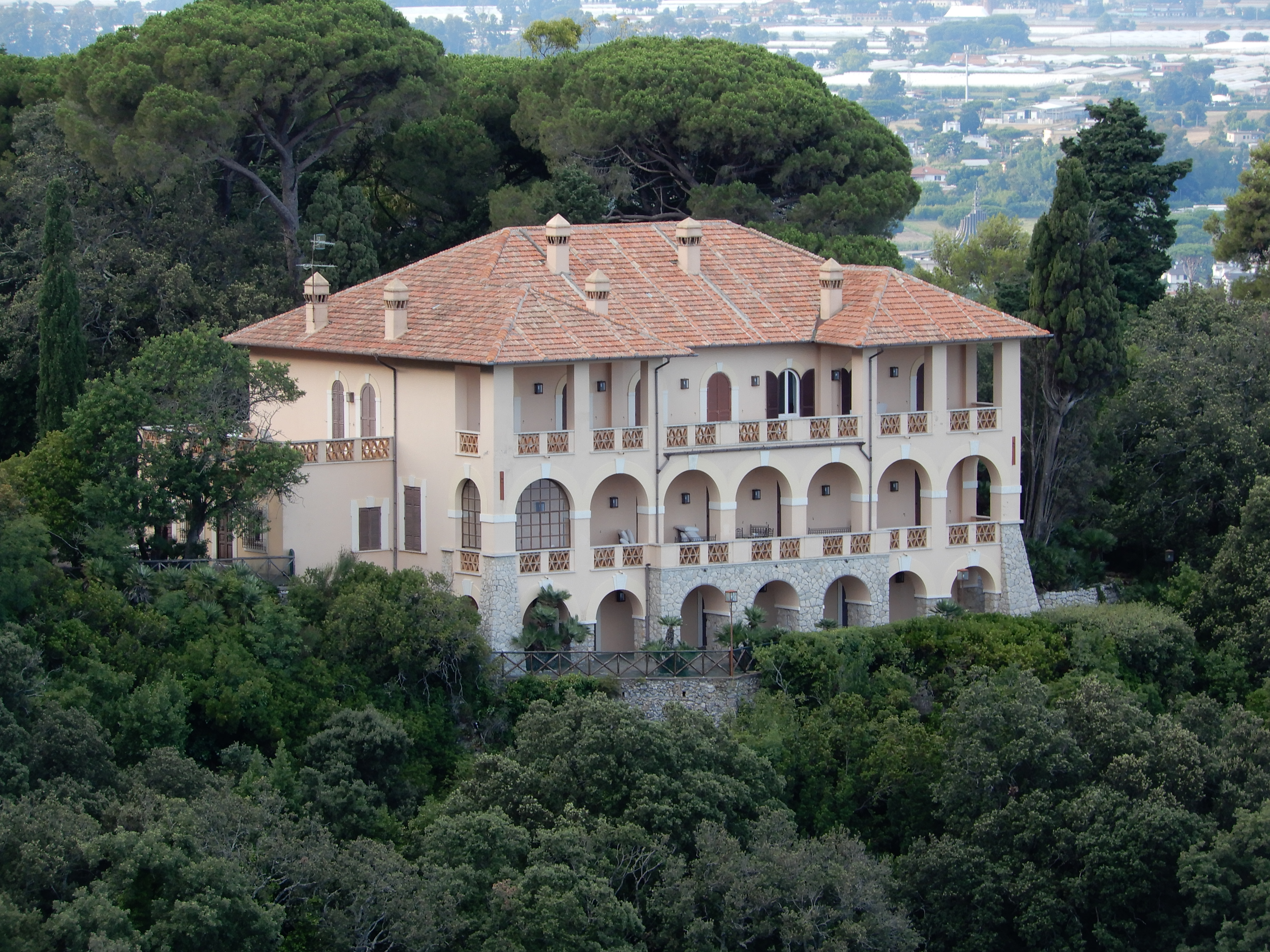
- Villa Aguet in San Felice Circeo
- Click on the map for a fullscreen view

General information
- Location: San Felice Circeo, Italy
- Coordinates: 41°13′46.94″N 13°05′24.16″E

Villa Aguet is a historic villa located in San Felice Circeo, Italy.

== History ==
La villa was built at the request of the Polish prince Stanislas Poniatowski at the beginning of the 19th century during the period when he owned the fief of San Felice Circeo.

The property later belonged to baron James Aguet, a Swiss nobleman and businessman, its current namesake.

== Description ==
The villa is situated in a panoramic position on the slopes of Mount Circeo, not far from the historic center of San Felice Circeo. The building, which features loggias on the sea-facing facade, spans three levels and is surrounded by a large private park.

== Gallery ==
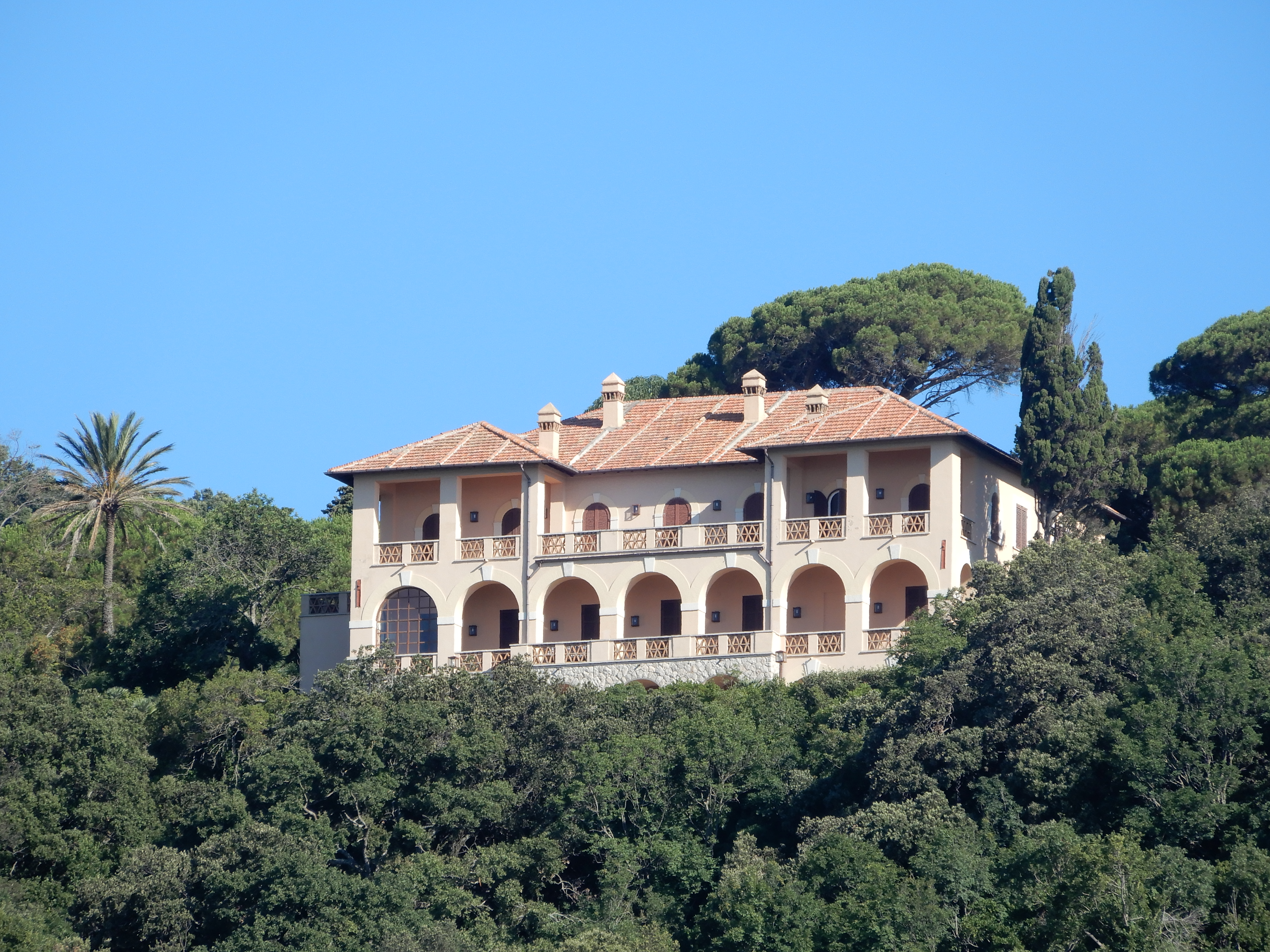

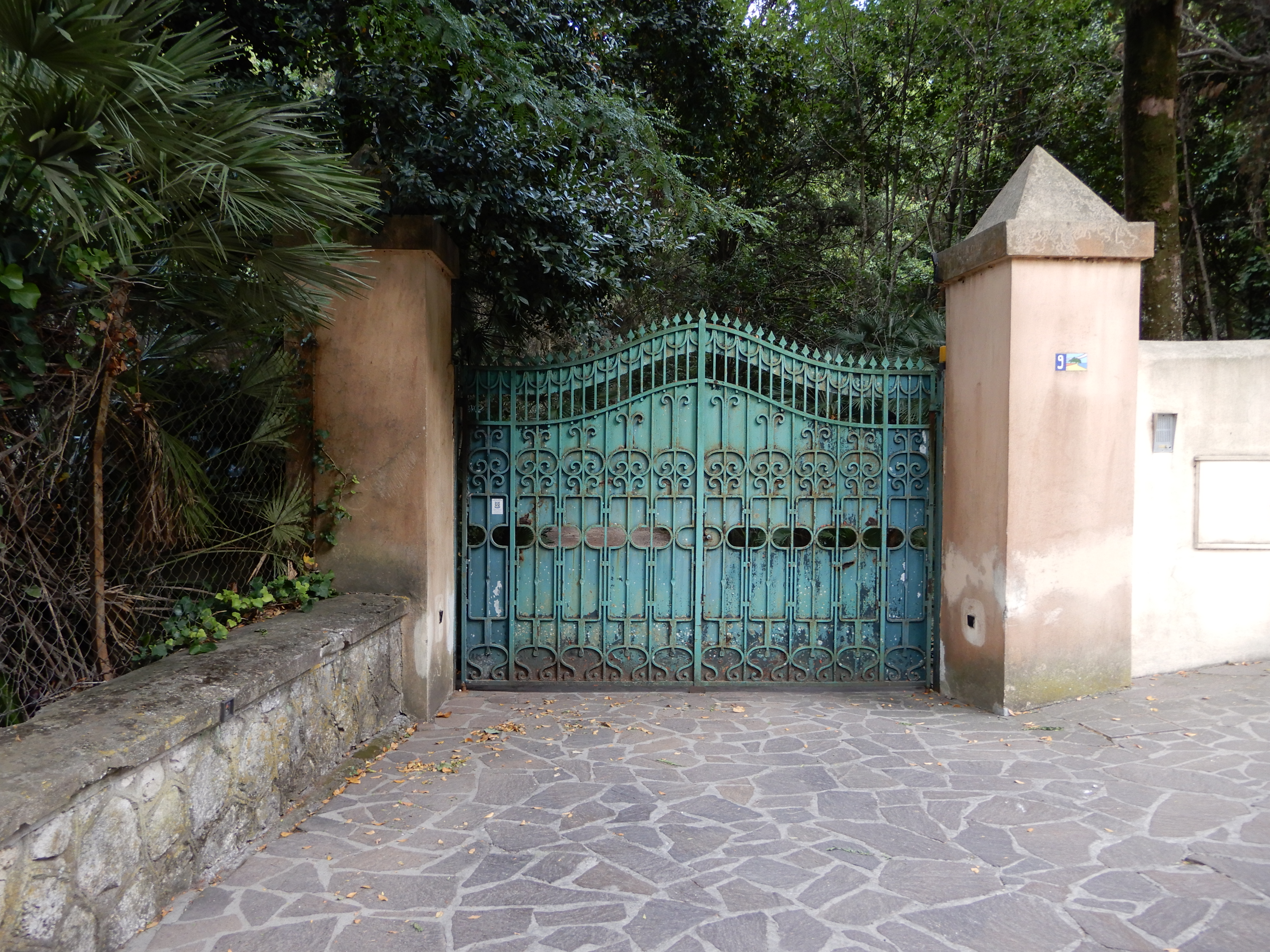

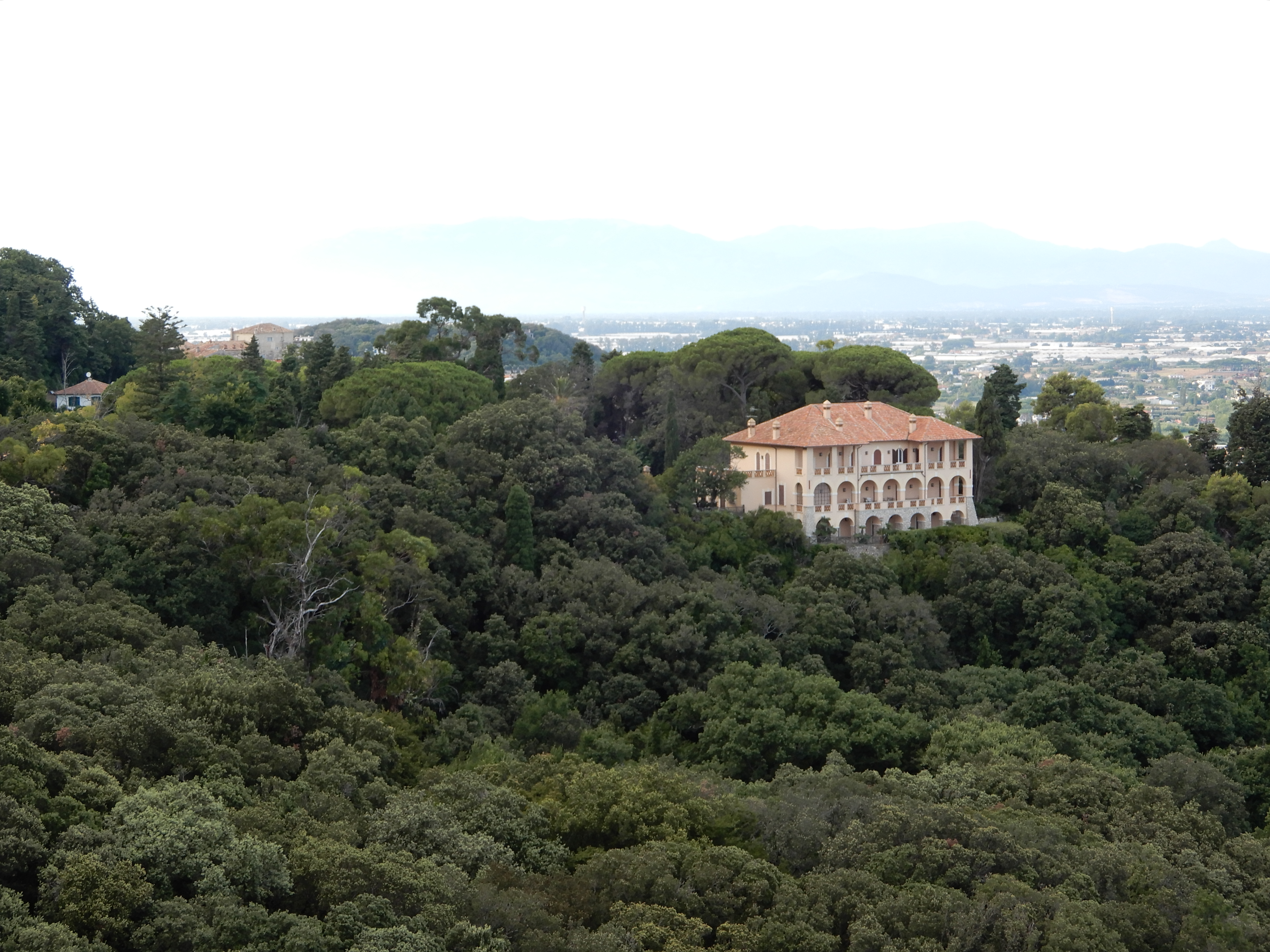
