= Circeo National Park =

Italian national park

- Parco Nazionale del Circeo
- IUCN category II (national park)
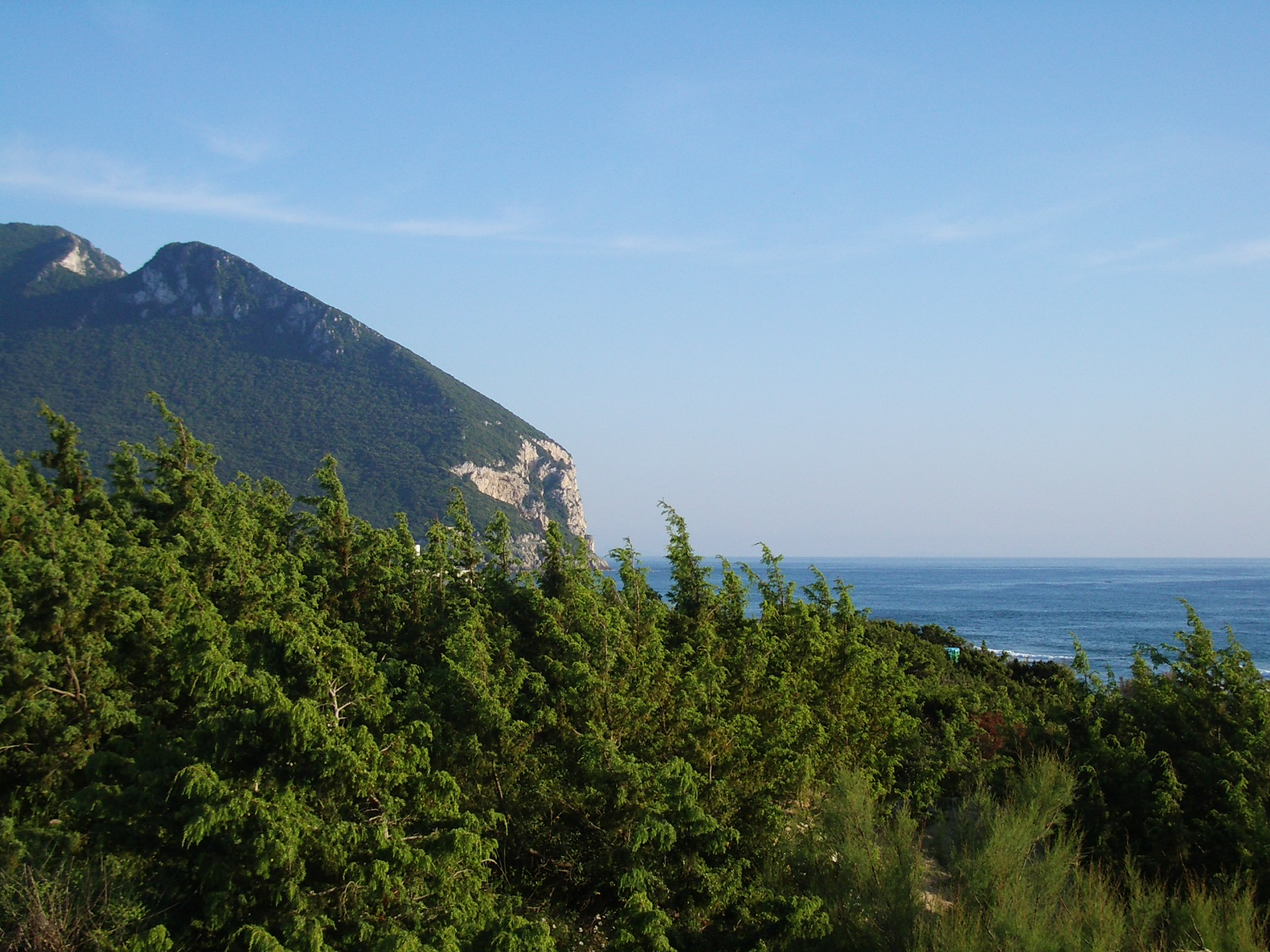
- Maquis shrubland with the Mount Circeo promontory in the background.

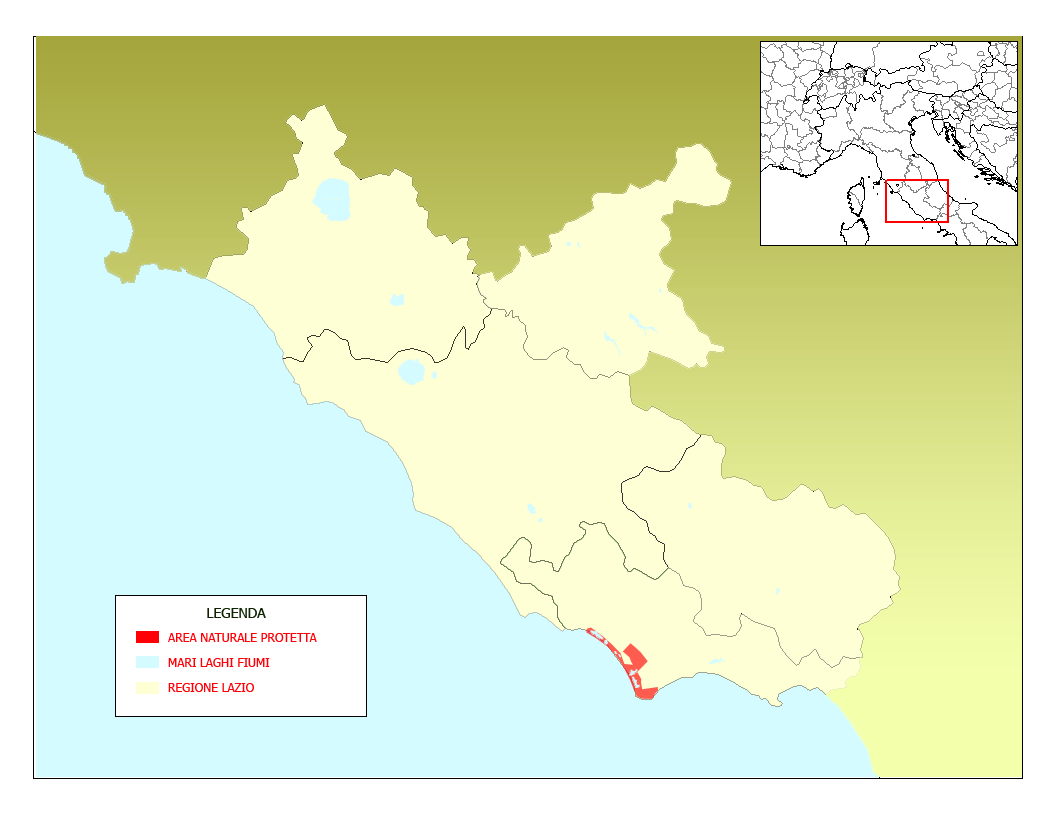
- Parco del Circeo map
- Location: Lazio
- Nearest city: San Felice Circeo
- Coordinates: 41°14′6″N 13°3′50.4″E
- Area: 84.40 km^{2} (32.59 sq mi)
- Established: 1934
- Governing body: Ministero dell'Ambiente
- Website: www.parks.it/parco.nazionale.circeo/Eindex.html

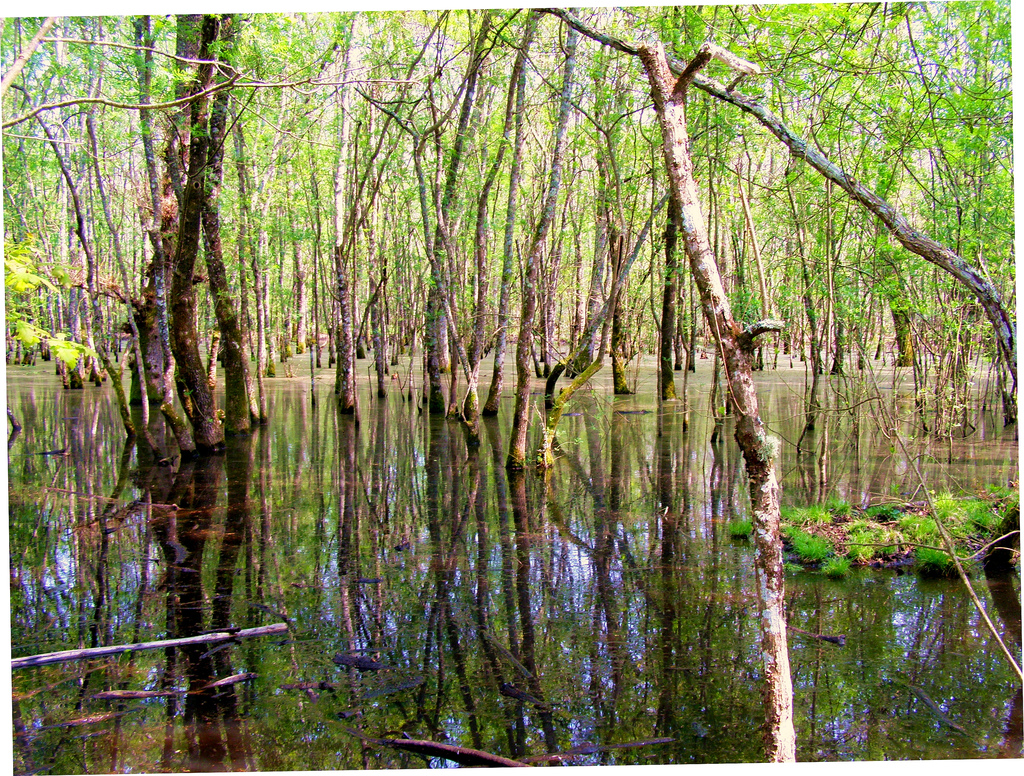
A typical piscina in the park's plain forest.

Circeo National Park (Italian: Parco Nazionale del Circeo) is an Italian national park founded in 1934. It occupies a strip of coastal land from Anzio to Terracina, including also a sector of forest in the mainland of San Felice Circeo, and the island of Zannone.

The park was established by order of Benito Mussolini, under advice from Senator Raffaele Bastianelli, to preserve the last remains of the Pontine Marshes which were being reclaimed in that period. It is the only national park in Italy to occupy only a plain and coastal area. It reaches from approximately Pontinia in the north to Sabaudia in the south.

== Territory ==
The park can be divided into five main habitats: the forest, the promontory, the littoral dune, the humid area and the island of Zannone.

=== Forest area ===
The forest included in the park, occupying a grossly square sector between the SS 148 Pontina state road and the coast of San Felice Circeo, is the last relic of the so-called ancient "Selva di Terracina", once occupying much of what is now the central province of Latina. Now reduced to an area of c. 3,300 hectares, it is anyway the largest plain forest in Italy.

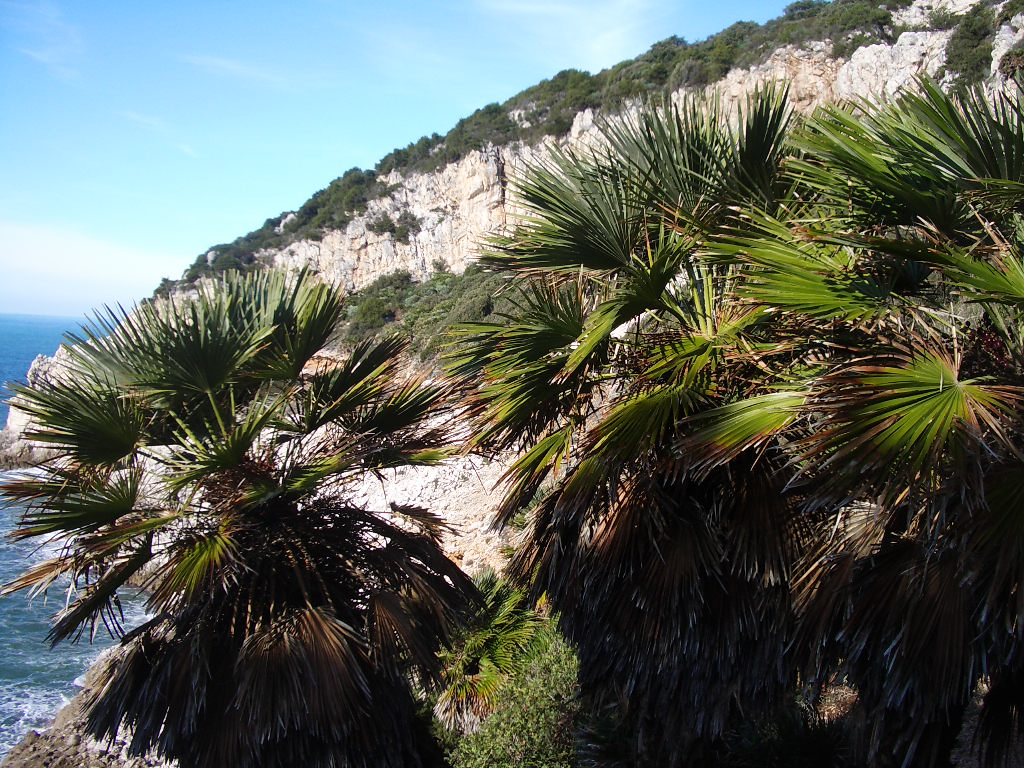
Mediterranean fan palms in the southern slopes of Mount Circeo.

It is characterized by the peculiar piscine ("swimming pools"), temporary marshy areas forming in the autumn season due to the accumulation of rainwater, and the lestre, where once the sparse population built their villages. Vegetation includes maquis shrubland, continental species such as Turkish oak, fraxinus and common oak, as well as typical Mediterranean trees including the holm oak, the bay laurel and the cork oak.

Understory is also rich, featuring common hawthorn, blackthorn, wild apple, pear and strawberry trees, erica, Ruscus aculeatus and numerous others.

The berry vegetation allows the presence of a rich fauna, including wild boar, fallow deer, hare, european badger, red fox, weasel, green whip snake, Natrix maura, land and marsh Testudo, Triturus newt, toad and frog among the others.

=== Promontory ===
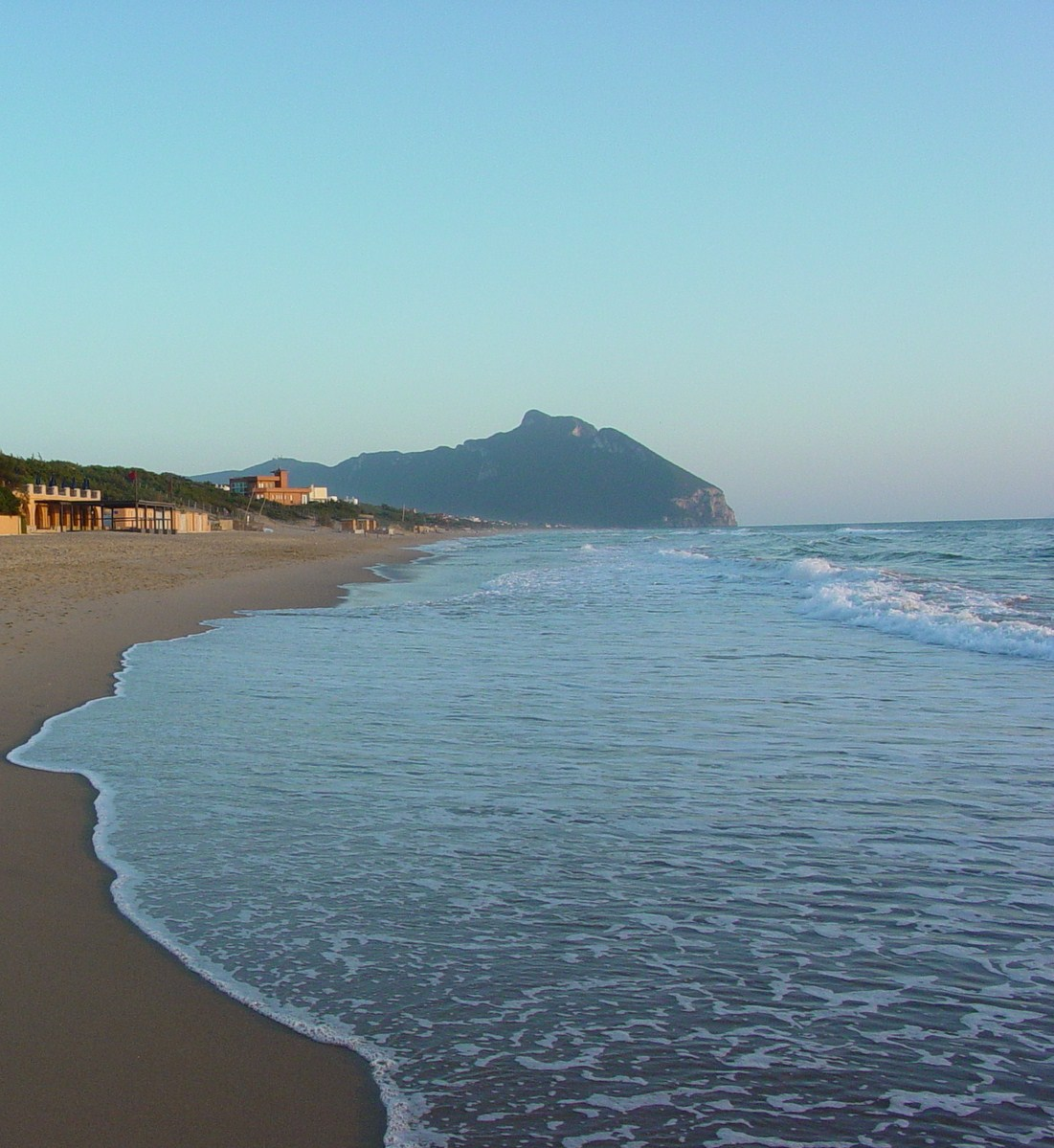
Mount Circeo as seen from the beach of dunes in Sabaudia, Italy.

The promontory of Circeo, with a maximum height of 541 m, is a Mesozoic limestone-dolomite massif with a peculiar island shape, and gives its name to the whole park.

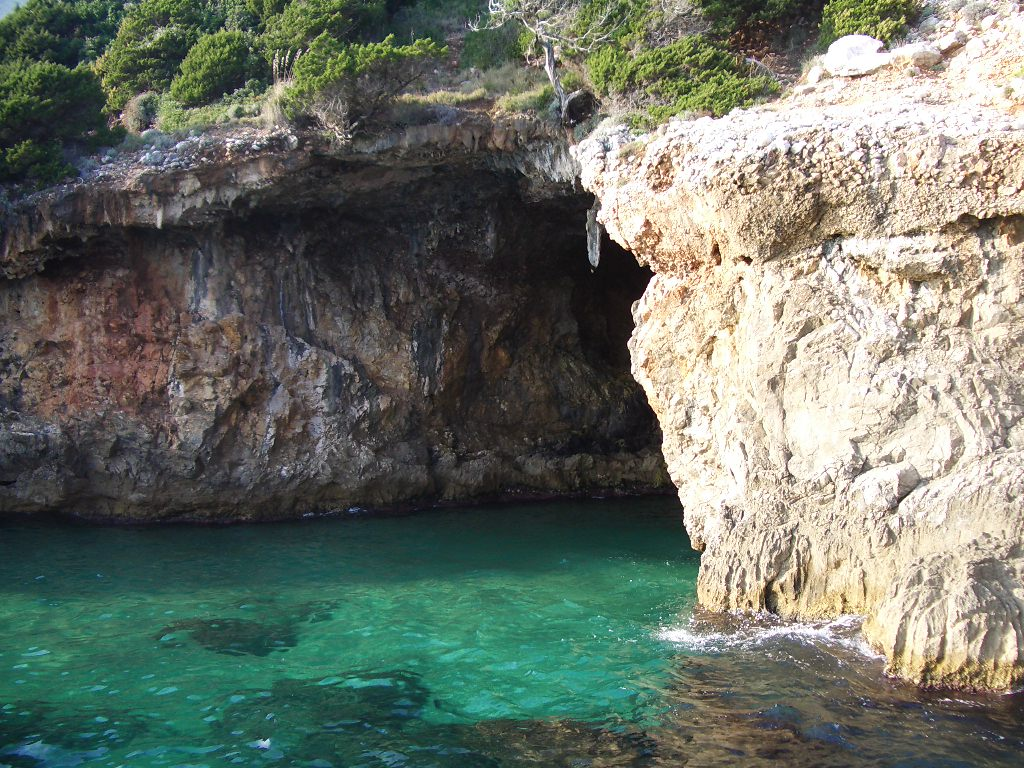
Grotta dell'Impiso.

From a naturalistic point of view, it can be divided into two different sectors. The northern slopes of the promontory have a more humid climate and are covered by a thick shrub of holly oak in the upper sector, which, at the lower heights, is associated with manna arsh, Ostrya carpinifolia, downy and Italian oak. The understory includes erica, broom and strawberry tree, while where the mount descends to the plain is a 25 ha cork oak wood. The southern slopes have a milder climate and are characterized by Mediterranean rock vegetation (holm oak, Phoenicean juniper, euphorbia tree, myrtus, Pistacia lentiscus, rosemary and erica, while amongst the lower plants are the rock samphire, Helichrysum and Centaurea.

Wildlife, aside from the European badger, wild boar and beech marten, includes numerous bird species such as peregrine falcon and the common kestrel.

Among the numerous coastal caves of naturalistic interest are the Grotta Guattari, where in 1939 a skull of Homo neanderthalensis was found, the Goats Cave (Italian: Grotta delle Capre), the Impiso Cave (Italian: Grotta dell'Impiso), the Grotta del Fossellone and the Grotta Breuil; the latter was also inhabited by the Neanderthal Man.

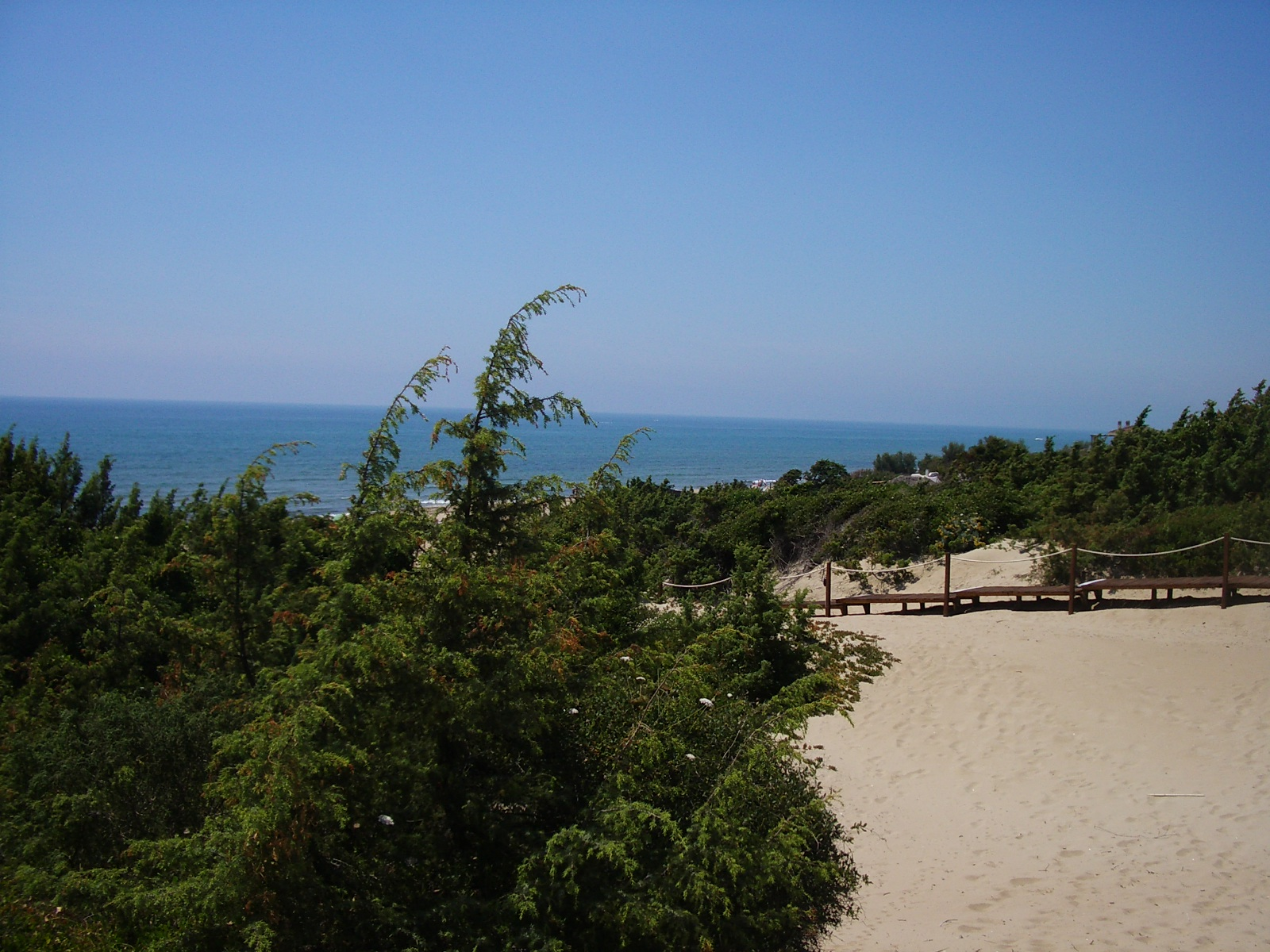
The coastal dune of the park.

=== Sea dunes ===
The park is home to a 22 km-long coastal sand strip, from the limestone cliffs of the Mount Circeo, in correspondence of the Torre Paola watchtower, up to Capo Portiere. The sand, characterized by fine sand, is backed by a typical maquis shrubland with a maximum depth of 27 meters. The section nearer to the sea is home to short vegetation, housing a number of small size wildlife including the European badger, foxes, lizards and beetles.

Farther from the sea are bigger plants, such as the prickly juniper and mastic, up to true trees like the maritime pine and the holm oak, or, near the lakes (see following section), the alder, fraxinus, poplar and willow.

=== Humid areas ===
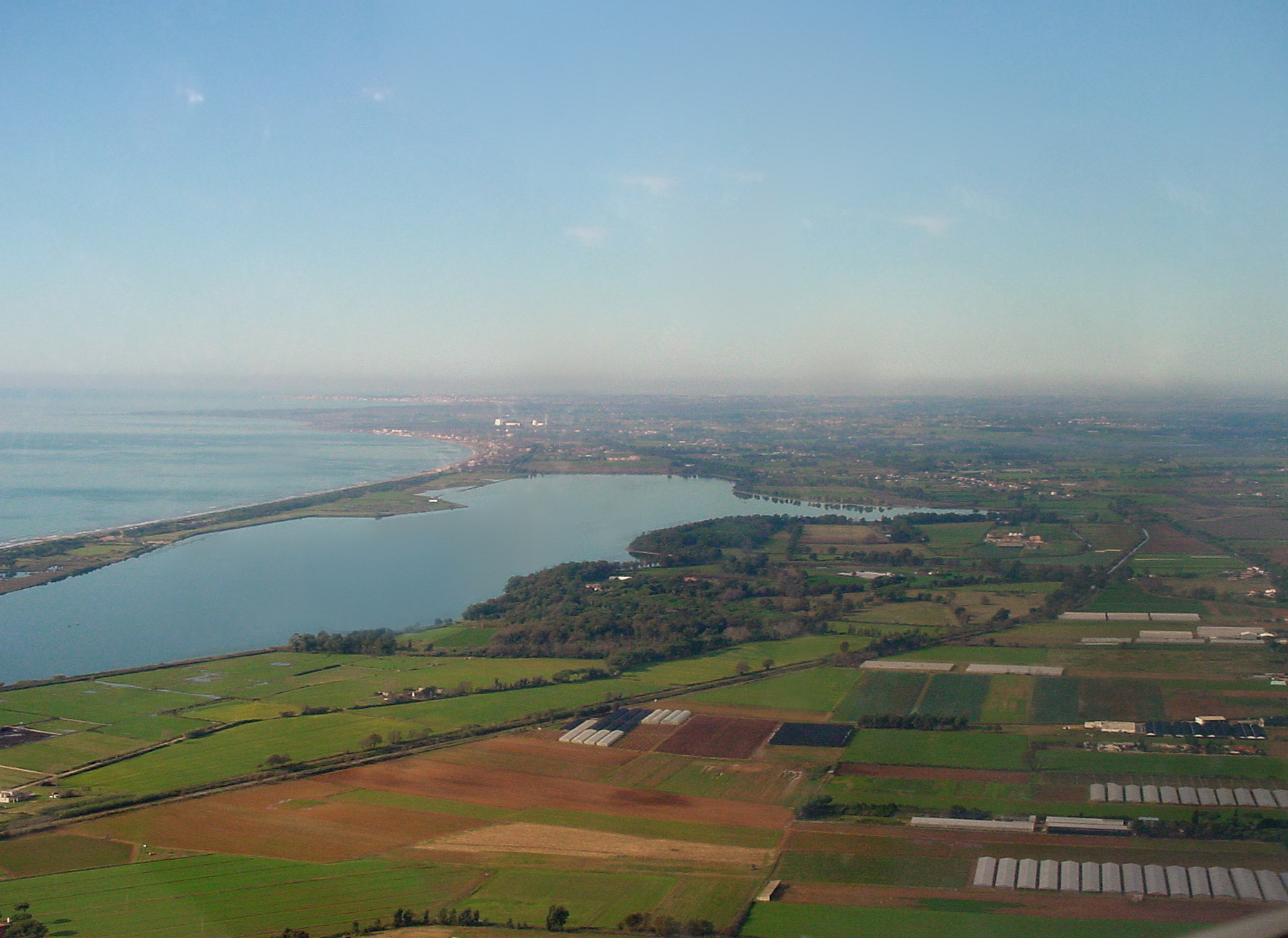
Aerial view of the coastal lakes.

The humid area of the Circeo park includes four coastal salt lakes: Paola, Caprolace, Monaci and Fogliano, which are what remains of the Pontine Marshes and currently are home to a vast wildlife of aquatic birds (cattle egret, crane, goose, northern lapwing, skylark, curlew), as well as to rare species such as the marsh turtle. With a maximum depth of two meters, they are connected to the sea through a series of canals.

Other species present in the area include badger, wild boar, fox, crested porcupine, wild weasel, and European hedgehog. Vegetation is composed, on the lakes' shores, by salicornia (Arthrocnemum glaucum), inula and tamarisk among the others.

Apart the lakes, there are some further smaller marshy area in which Italian Mediterranean buffalo shepherding is practiced.

=== Zannone ===
Zannone is a small island belonging to the Ponziano archipelago, annexed to the park in 1979. Uninhabited, it is covered by woods of oaks and holm oaks, and is the only island in the archipelago to have kept its original vegetation cover. The latter include strawflower, mastic, myrtus, common broom, erica, euphorbia, strawberry tree and bay laurel.
