= Ad Turres Albas =

Ancient city of Latium

Ad Turres Albas was an ancient city of Latium. Ad Turres Albas originally belonged to the Volsci, and stood on the coast and on the Via Severiana, 9 miles from Circeii and 9 miles from Astura. The location of Ad Turres Albas is not precisely known: the editors of the Barrington Atlas of the Greek and Roman World place it at near the modern Lago di Caprolace in the Province of Latina, Lazio, Italy.
