= Capo Circeo Lighthouse =

Lighthouse in Lazio, Italy

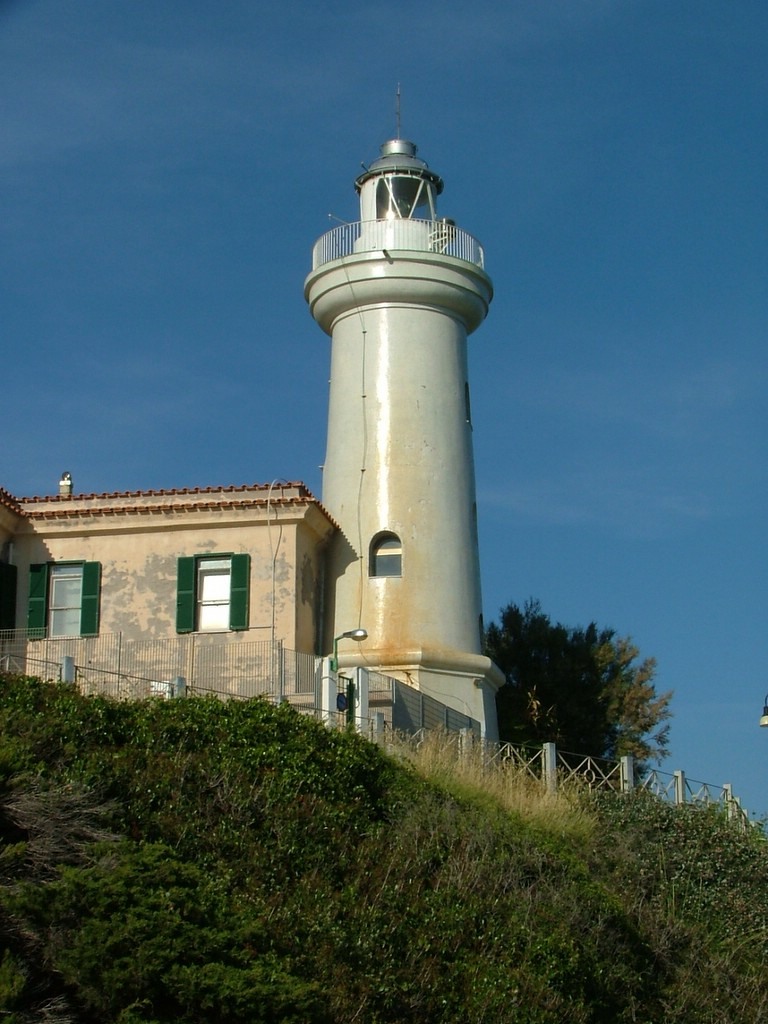
- Capo Circeo lighthouse
- Location: San Felice Circeo; Lazio; Italy
- Coordinates: 41°13′20″N 13°04′07″E

Tower
- Constructed: 1866
- Foundation: octagonal prism basement
- Height: 18 metres (59 ft)
- Shape: cylindrical tower with gallery and lantern
- Markings: white tower, grey metallic lantern dome
- Power source: mains electricity
- Operator: Marina Militare

Light
- Focal height: 38 metres (125 ft)
- Lens: Type OR S3
- Intensity: main: AL 1000 W LABI 100 W
- Range: main: 23 nautical miles (43 km; 26 mi) reserve: 18 nautical miles (33 km; 21 mi)
- Characteristic: FI W 5s.
- Italy no.: 2258 E.F

Capo Circeo Lighthouse (Italian: Faro di Capo Circeo) is an active lighthouse in Lazio, Italy, located on Capo Circeo, about 3 kilometres west of San Felice Circeo.

== History ==
The lighthouse has been active since 1866, and was built under the pontificate of Pope Pius IX. The lighthouse is composed of a keeper's house with an adjacent tower 18 metres high.

The lighthouse has a rotating view that emits flashes of white light every 5 seconds. The height of the focal plane above sea level is about 38 metres. The lighthouse has a rated capacity of 23 nautical miles (43 km). It is part of the Command Area Lighthouses of the Navy based in Naples, which deals with all the lights of the southern Tyrrhenian Sea.

== Gallery ==
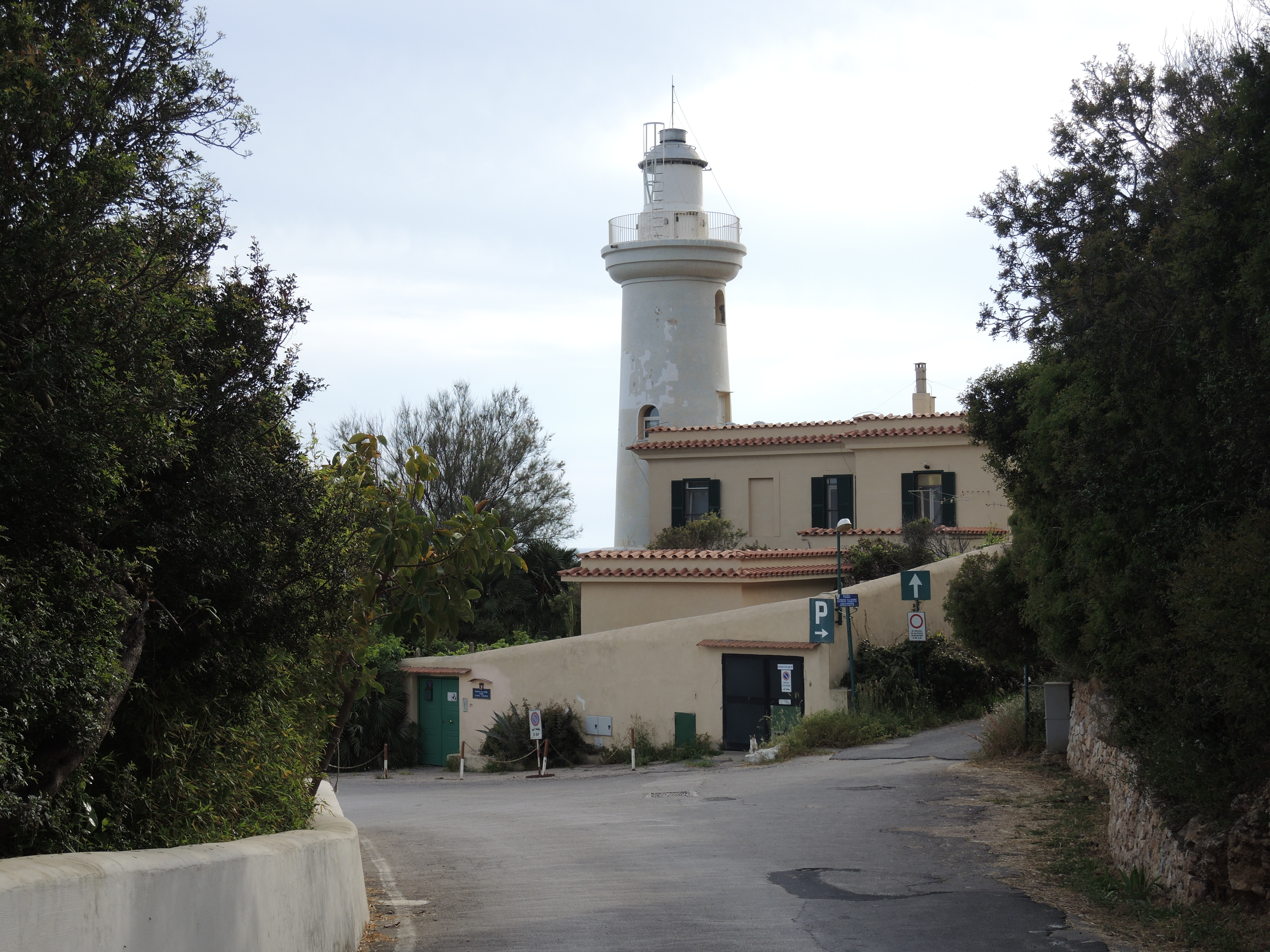

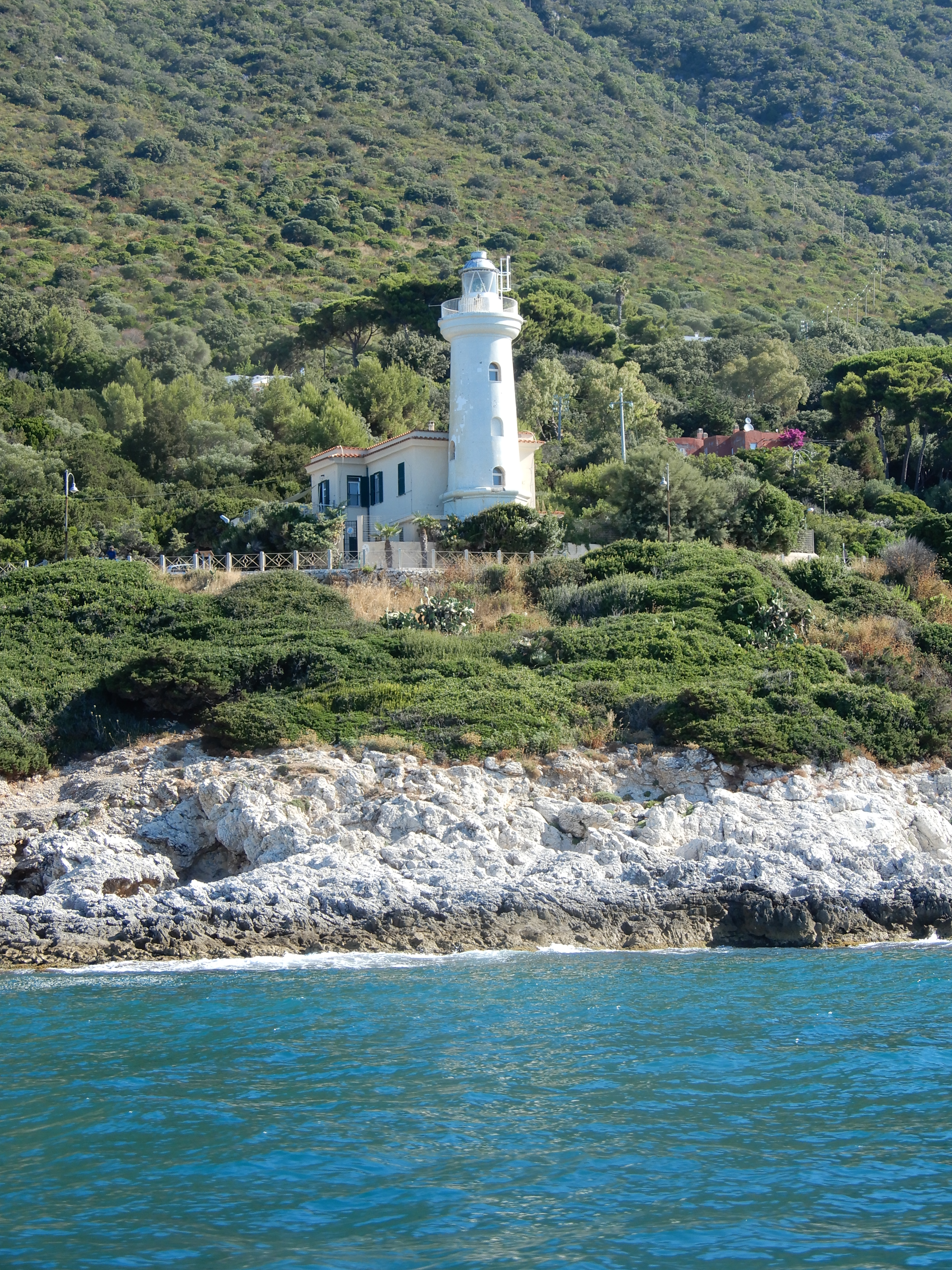

== See also ==
- List of lighthouses in Italy
