= Goats Cave =

Cave in Italy

- Grotta delle Capre
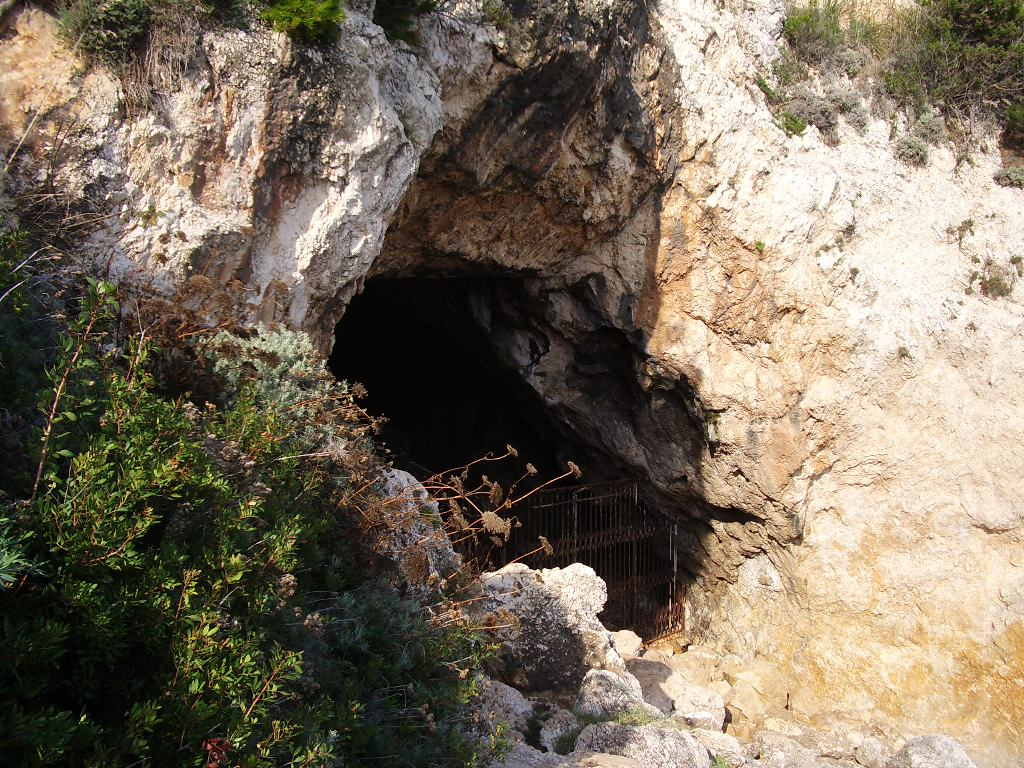
- View of the cave's entrance

- Location within Italy
- Location: San Felice Circeo, Italy
- Coordinates: 41°13′26.62″N 13°04′58″E
- Entrances: 1
- Access: Public

The Goats Cave (Italian: Grotta delle Capre) is a cliff-side cave located in San Felice Circeo, Italy.

== Location ==
The cave is located a few meters above sea level along the coast on the southern side of Mount Circeo in the comune of San Felice Circeo. Situated a few dozen meters east of the Impiso Cave, it can be accessed by land or sea.

== Description ==
The cave is approximately 35 metres (115 ft) wide and between 15 metres (49 ft) to 20 metres (66 ft) high in the middle of the vault. The cavity is rich in tunnels and chambers, the most prominent of which begins at the far end of the cave and penetrates deeply into the mountain's mass.

It likely derives its name from the fact that in the past it was used by shepherds as a shelter for their flocks of goats.

== Gallery ==
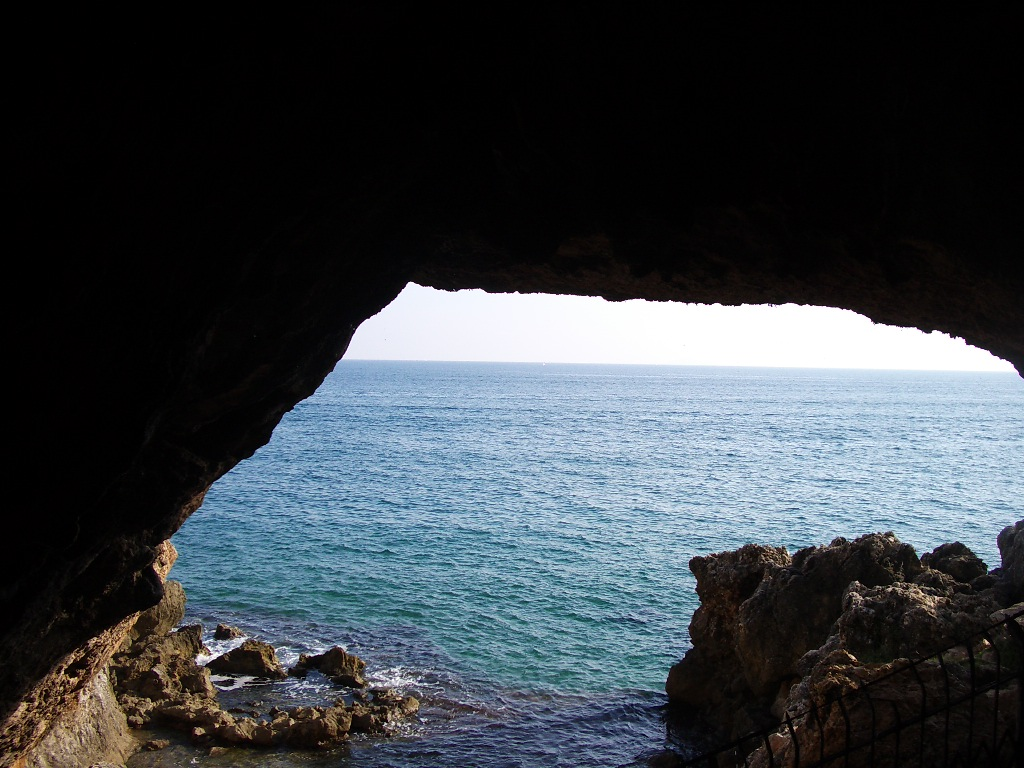

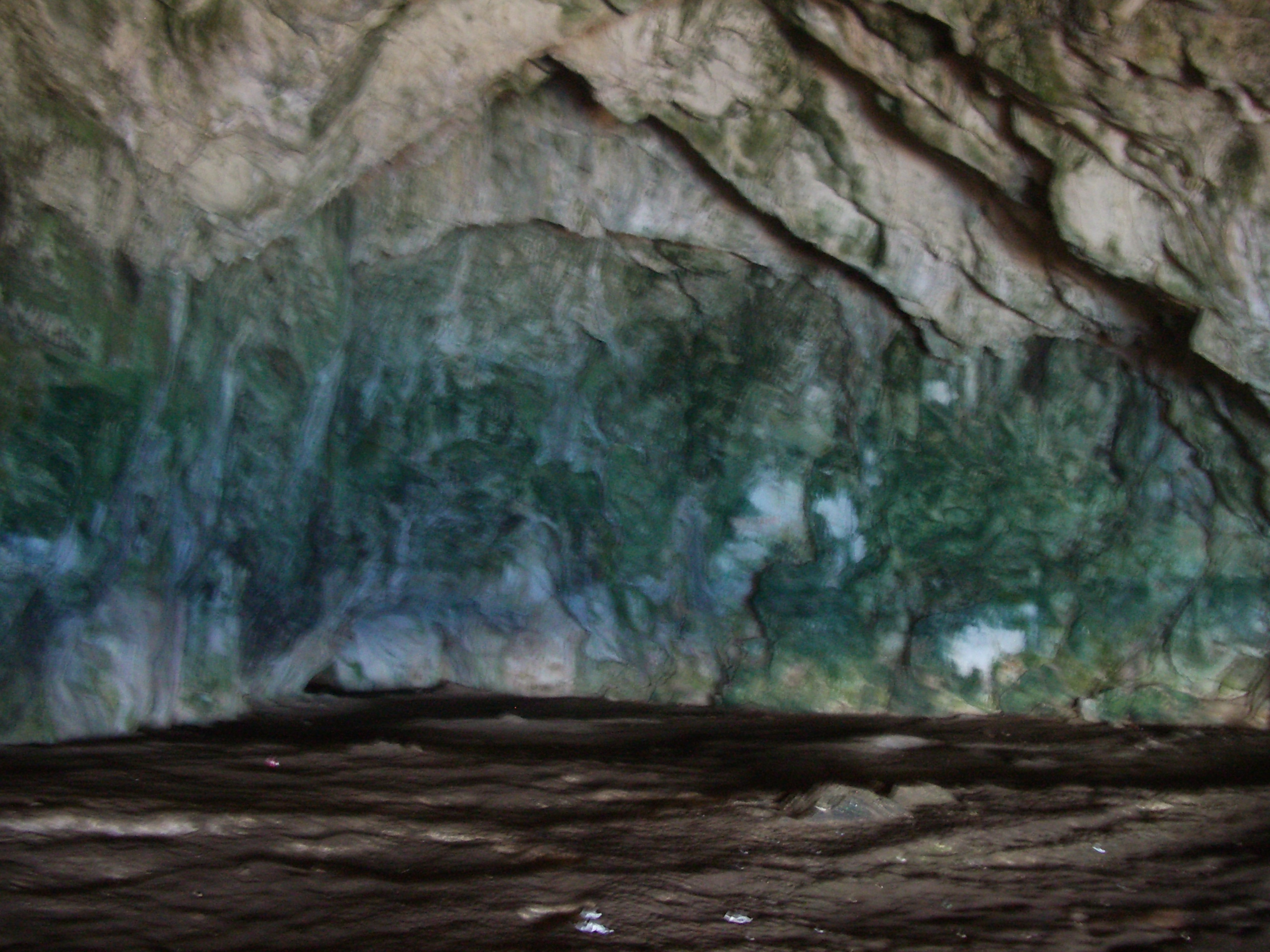

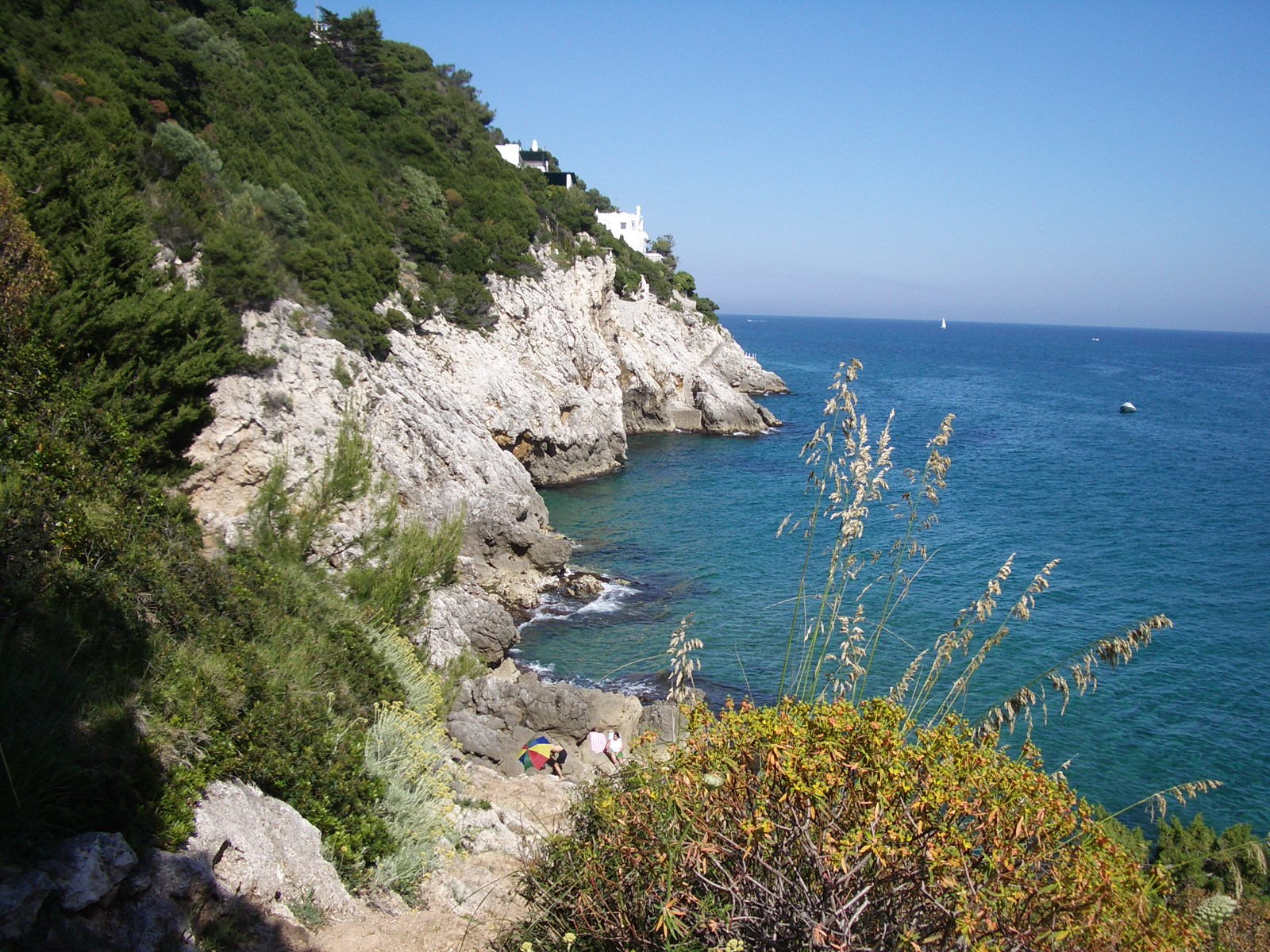

== See also ==
- List of caves in Italy
