= Ad Turres (Latium) =

Ancient city of Latium

Ad Turres was an ancient city of Latium. Ad Turres originally belonged to the Volsci, and stood on the Via Severiana, 4 miles from Circeii and 9 miles from Tarracina. The location of Ad Turres is not precisely known: the editors of Hazlitt's Classical Gazetteer place it at Torre Olevola, the editors of the Barrington Atlas of the Greek and Roman World tentatively place it at San Felice Circeo. Both places are in the modern Province of Latina, Lazio, Italy.
