= Ad Turres (Etruria) =

Ancient town in central Italy

Coordinates: 41°55′40″N 12°10′45″E

Ad Turres was an ancient city of Etruria. Ad Turres stood on the Via Aurelia, 10 miles from Lorium and 12 miles from Pyrgi. The location of Ad Turres is not precisely known; the editors of the Barrington Atlas of the Greek and Roman World tentatively place it near Palidoro, comune of Rome, Province of Rome, Lazio, Italy. The site is included on the Peutinger Table.

== Sources ==
- Hazlitt's Classical Gazetteer
- Talbert, Richard, ed. (2000). "Map 43". Barrington Atlas of the Greek and Roman World. Princeton University Press. ISBN 978-0-691-03169-9, with accompanying Map-by-Map Directory.
