= Lake Sabaudia =

Lake in Italy

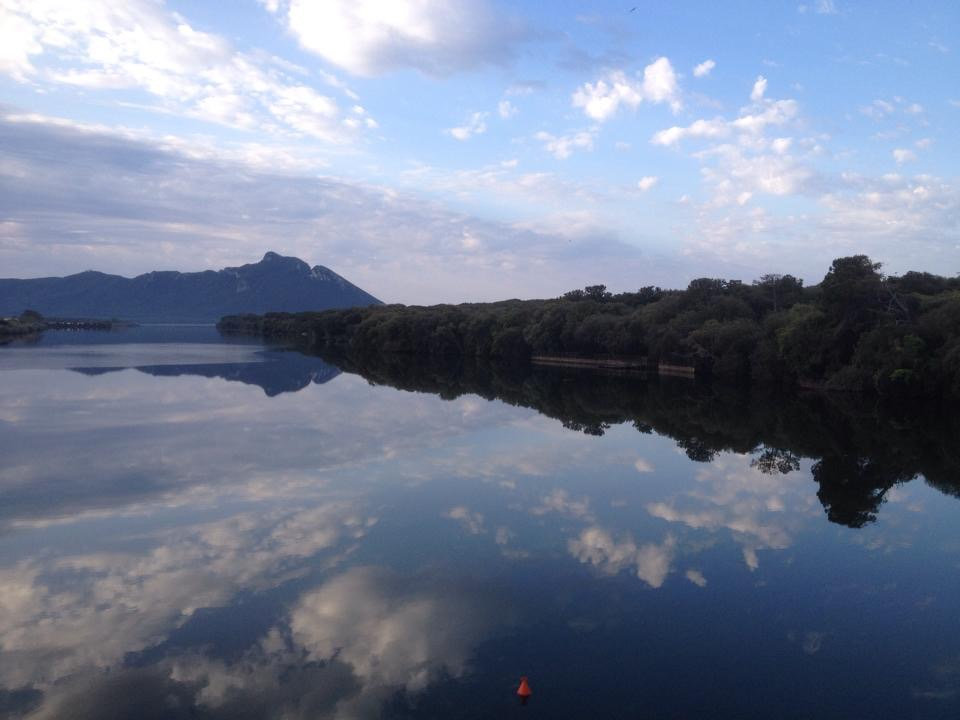
- Lake Sabaudia with Mount Circeo

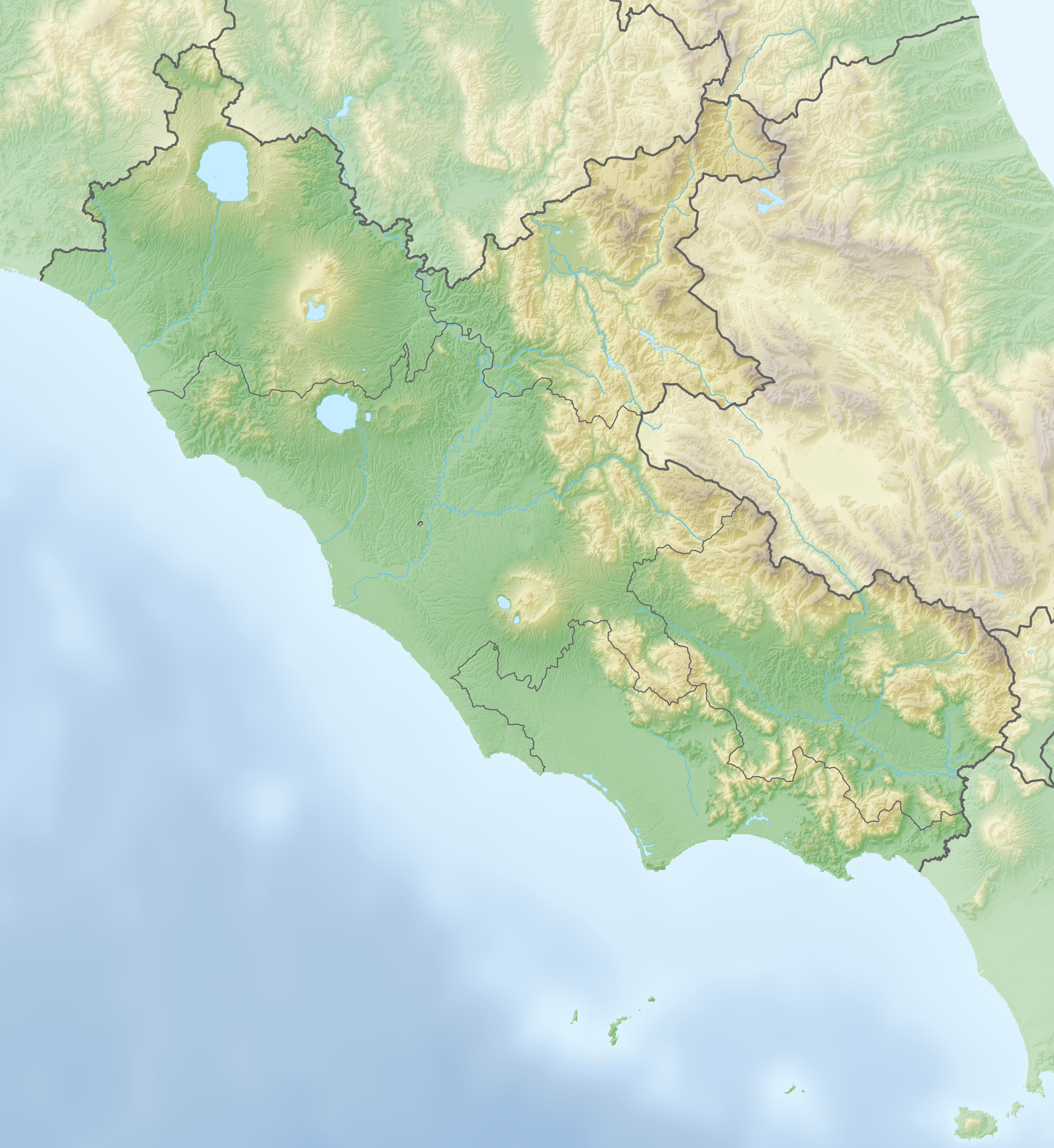
- Location within Lazio
- Location: Province of Latina, Lazio
- Coordinates: 41°16′44″N 13°01′38″E
- Basin countries: Italy
- Settlements: Sabaudia

Lake Sabaudia (Italian: Lago di Sabaudia), also known as Lake Paola (Italian: Lago di Paola), is a coastal lake in central Italy. Located in the comune of Sabaudia along the coast of the Tyrrhenian Sea, the lake entirely falls within the limits of Circeo National Park.

Sabaudia, Caprolace, Monaci, and Fogliano are the four coastal lakes within Circeo National Park. Lake Sabudia is partially bordered by the Sabaudia dunes, a 15-kilometer strip of coastal beach that runs between Sabaudia lake and the Tyrrhenian Sea.

In 1963–1964, the Giovanni XXIII Bridge was built across the lake linking the sand dune to the town of Sabaudia.

== Gallery ==
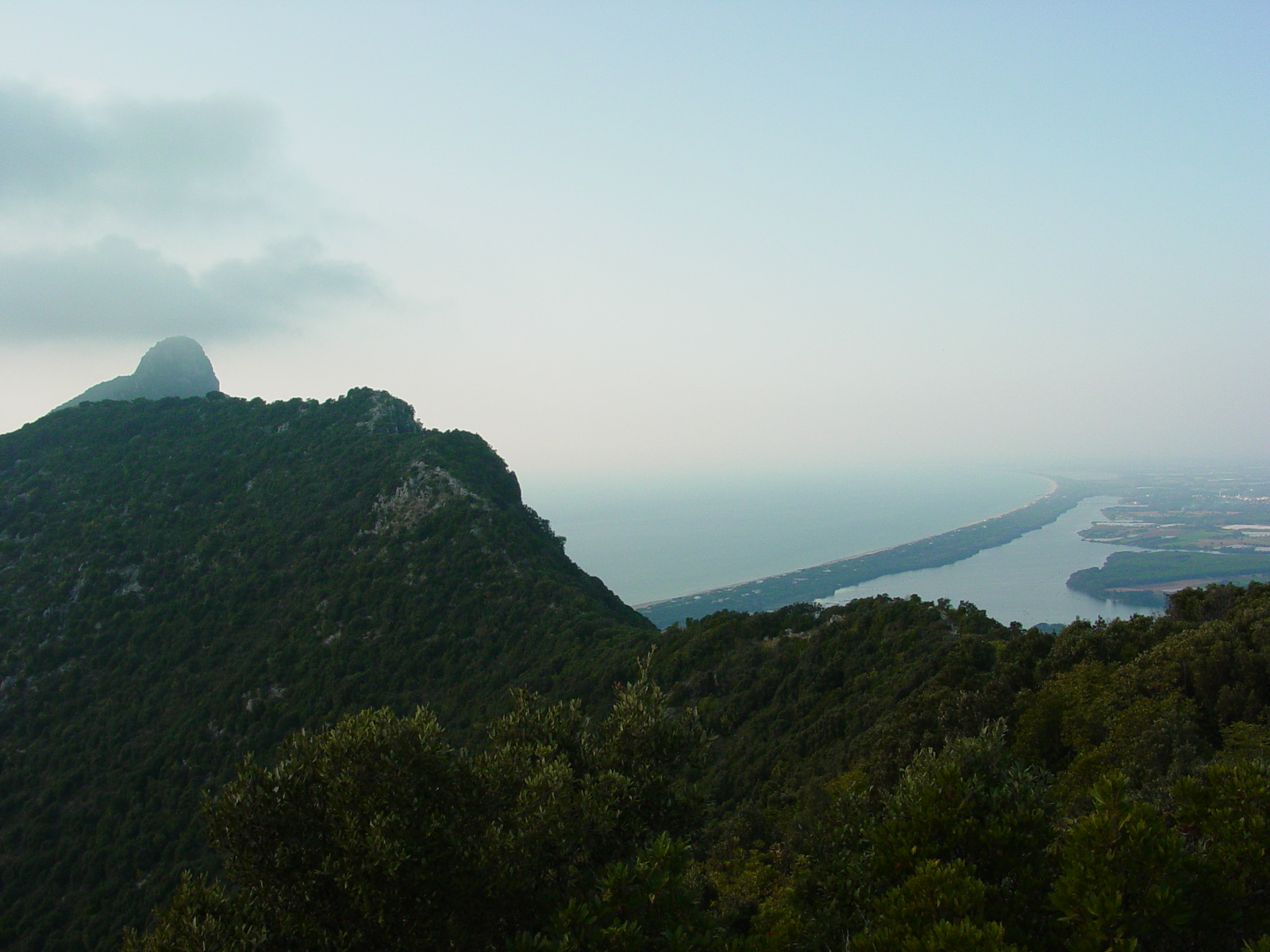

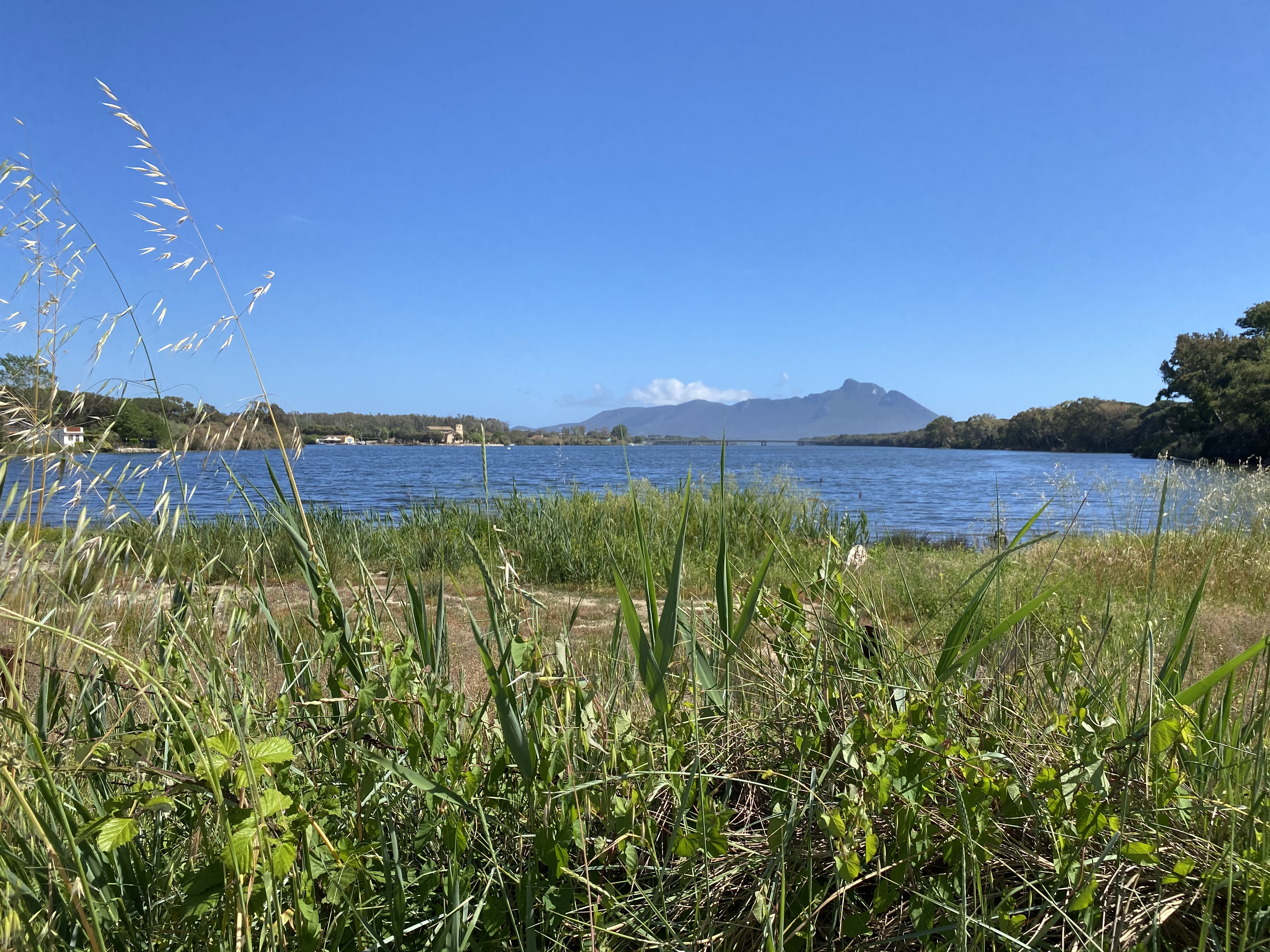

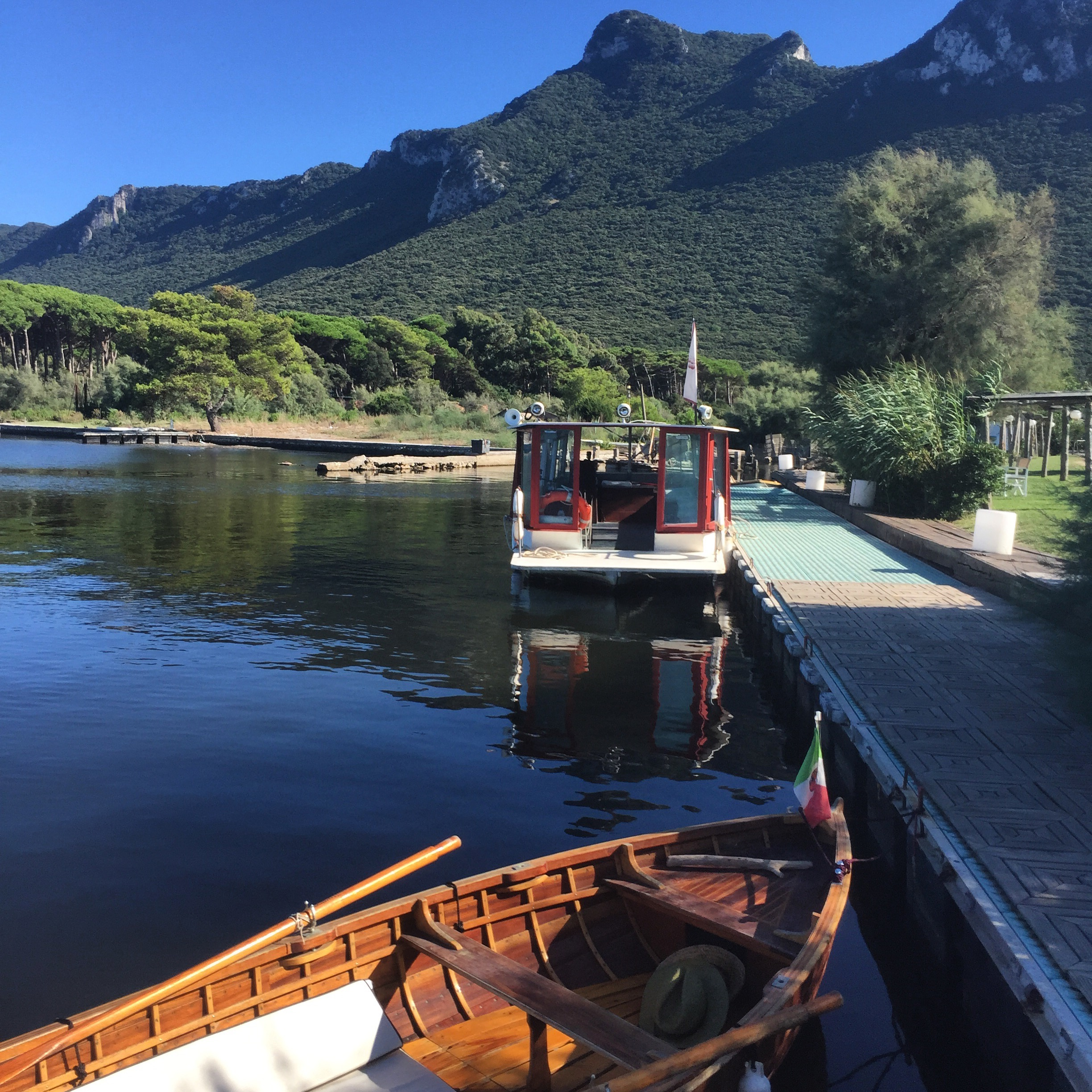
