= Ad Turres (Bruttium) =

Ancient town of Southern Italy

Ad Turres was an ancient town of Bruttium on Via Aquilia, 18 miles from Ad Sabbatum and 13 miles from Angitula. It has been identified with either Maida (by Hazlitt's Classical Gazetteer) or Lamezia Terme (Talbert, Richard, ed. (2000). "Map 46". Barrington Atlas of the Greek and Roman World. Princeton University Press. ISBN 978-0-691-03169-9.).
