= Impiso Cave =

Sea cave in San Felice Circeo, Italy

- Grotta dell'Impiso
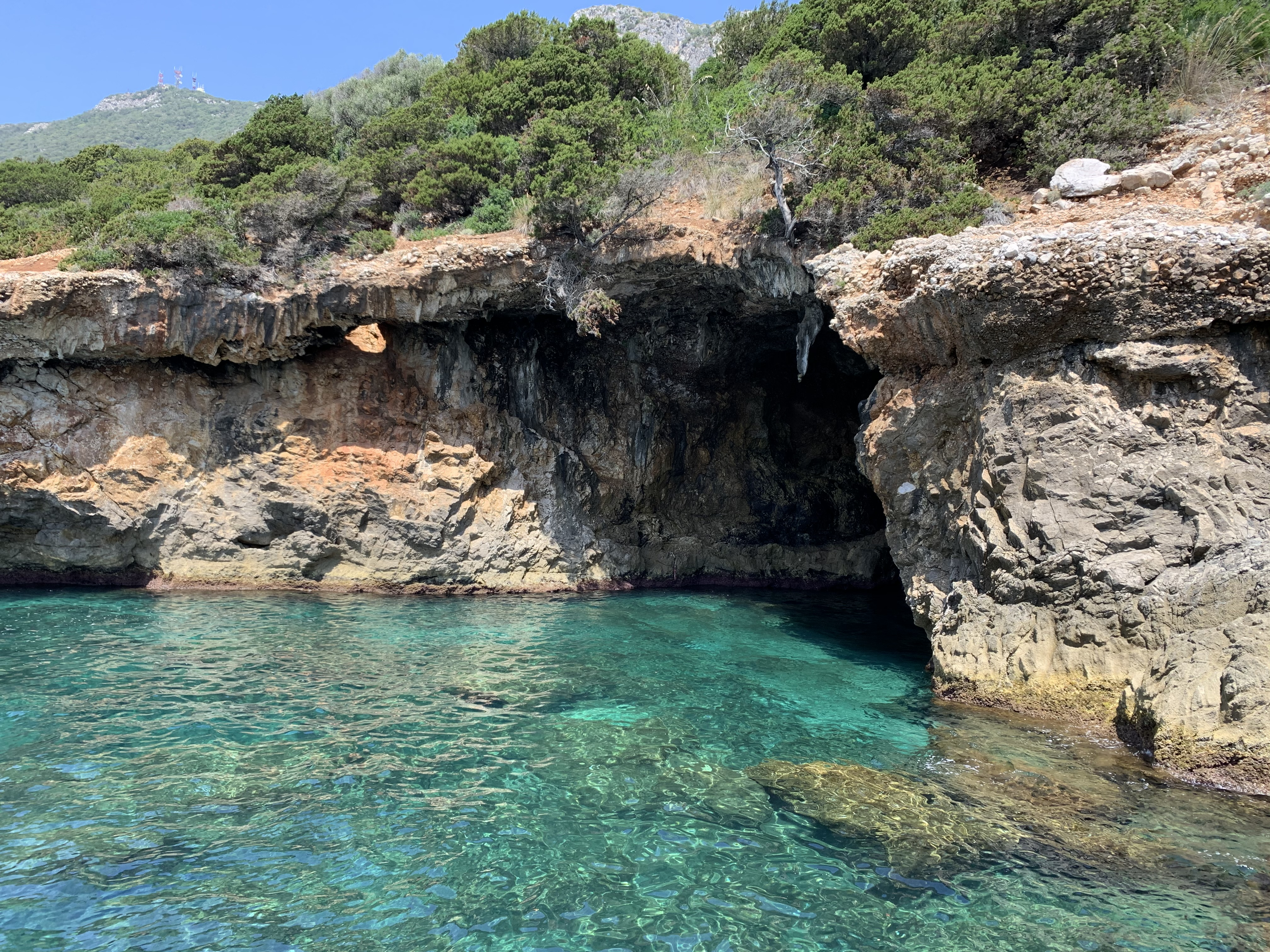
- View of the cave

- Location within Italy
- Location: San Felice Circeo, Italy
- Coordinates: 41°13′25.56″N 13°04′52.67″E
- Entrances: 1
- Access: Public

The Impiso Cave (Italian: Grotta dell'Impiso) is a sea cave located in San Felice Circeo, Italy.

== Location ==
The cave is located along the coast on the southern side of Mount Circeo in the comune of San Felice Circeo. Situated a few dozen meters west of the Goats Cave, it can only be accessed by sea.

== Description ==
It is so called because of the presence of a large stalactite hanging from the ceiling of its vault, which resembles a hanged man, translated as impiso in Italian.

== See also ==
- List of caves in Italy
