= Molentargius - Saline Regional Park =

Protected area in Sardinia, Italy

Designations

Ramsar Wetland
- Official name: Stagno di Molentargius
- Designated: 14 December 1976
- Reference no.: 133

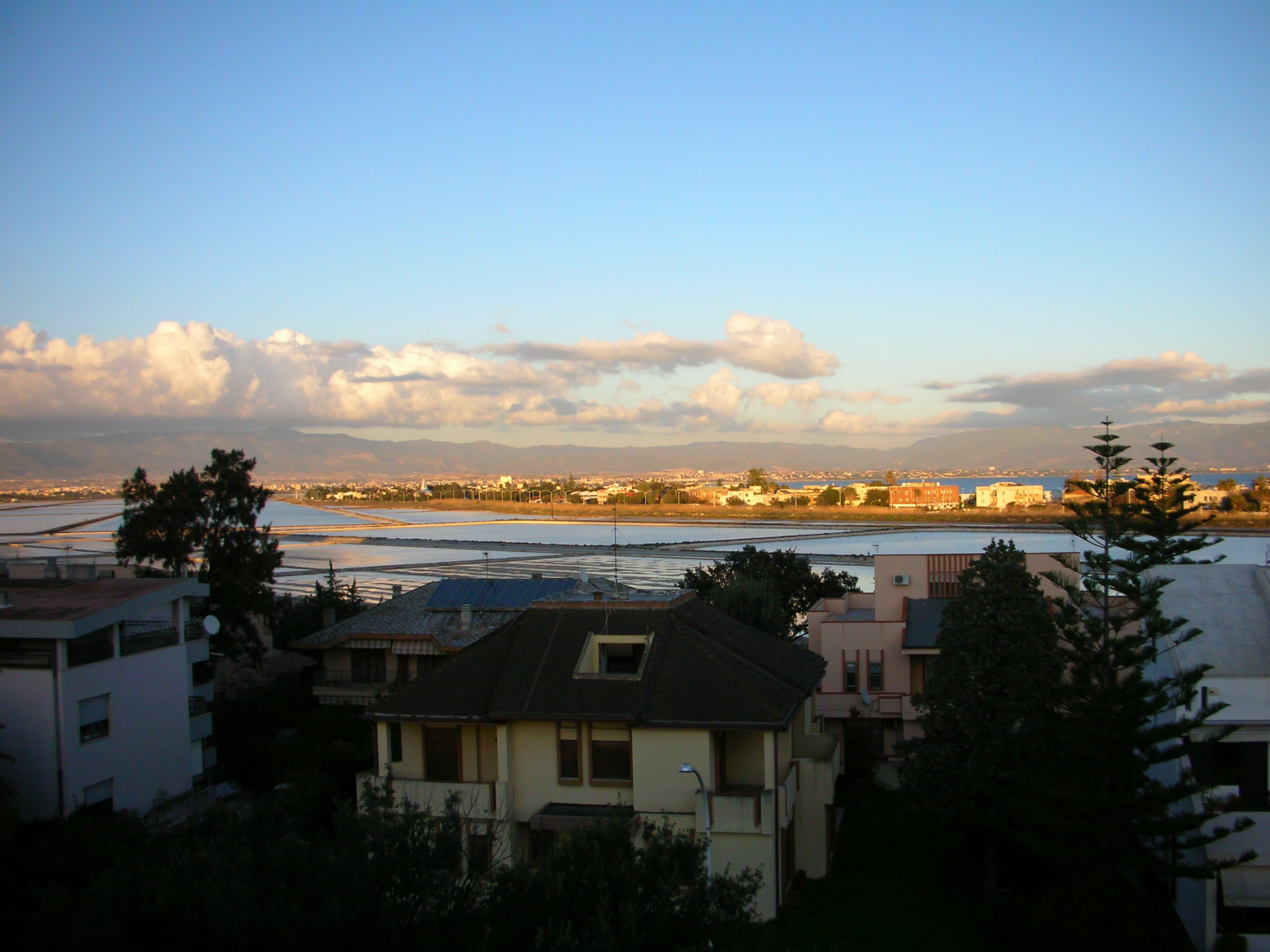
View towards the Molentargius salt mills.

Molentargius - Saline Regional Park (Italian: Parco naturale regionale Molentargius - Saline) is a regional park in Sardinia, Italy. It was established in 1999 to protect and enhance a site of international interest, already included in the Ramsar Convention since 1977 because of its relevance to stopover, wintering, and nesting waterfowl bird species.

Molentargius, in Sardinian language, means "donkeys handlers" as salt extraction was the richest industry of the Cagliari area for millennia, the salt being transported by donkeys. The park is a wetland extending over an area of about 1600 hectares, surrounded by the urbanized areas of Cagliari and the other towns of the metropolitan area and the waterfront of Poetto Beach.

The uniqueness of this area is the presence of reservoirs of both freshwater and saltwater, separated by a plain characterized by prevailing aridity called Is Arenas ("The Sands"). Areas with fresh water are the Bellarosa Minore and Perdalonga ponds, which were created to expand rainwater tanks. Areas of saltwater ponds include the production system of the former Statal Saline of Cagliari, consisting of the Bellarosa Maggiore or Is Molentargius (water storage tank evaporation), the Pond of Quartu (second and third tanks evaporation), the other salting basins (saline of Cagliari).

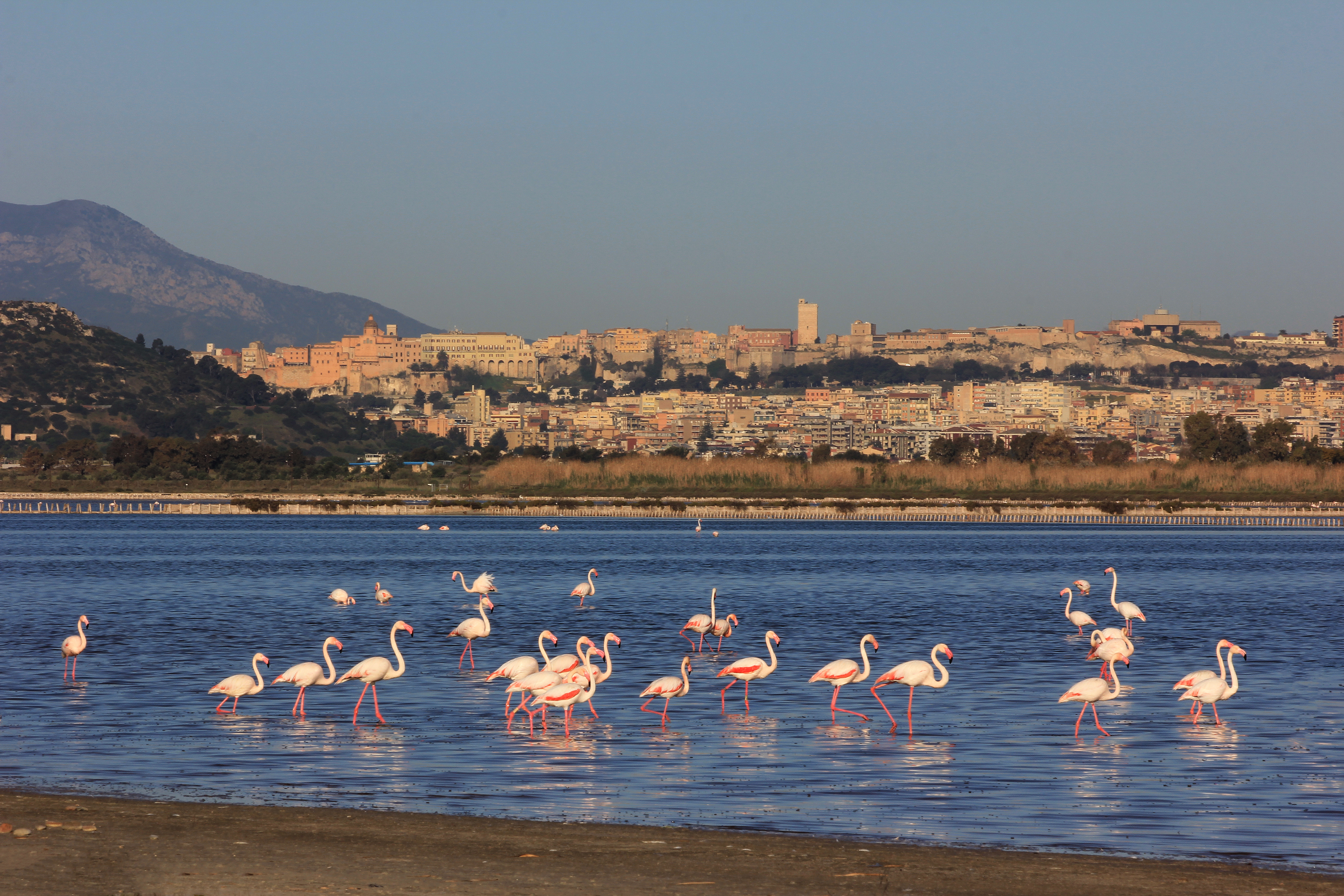
Greater flamingos have been nesting in the park since 1993

From 1850 to now, 230 bird species belonging to 53 families have been recorded in the Molentargius area.
