= Lago di Sibolla =

Lake in Tuscany, Italy

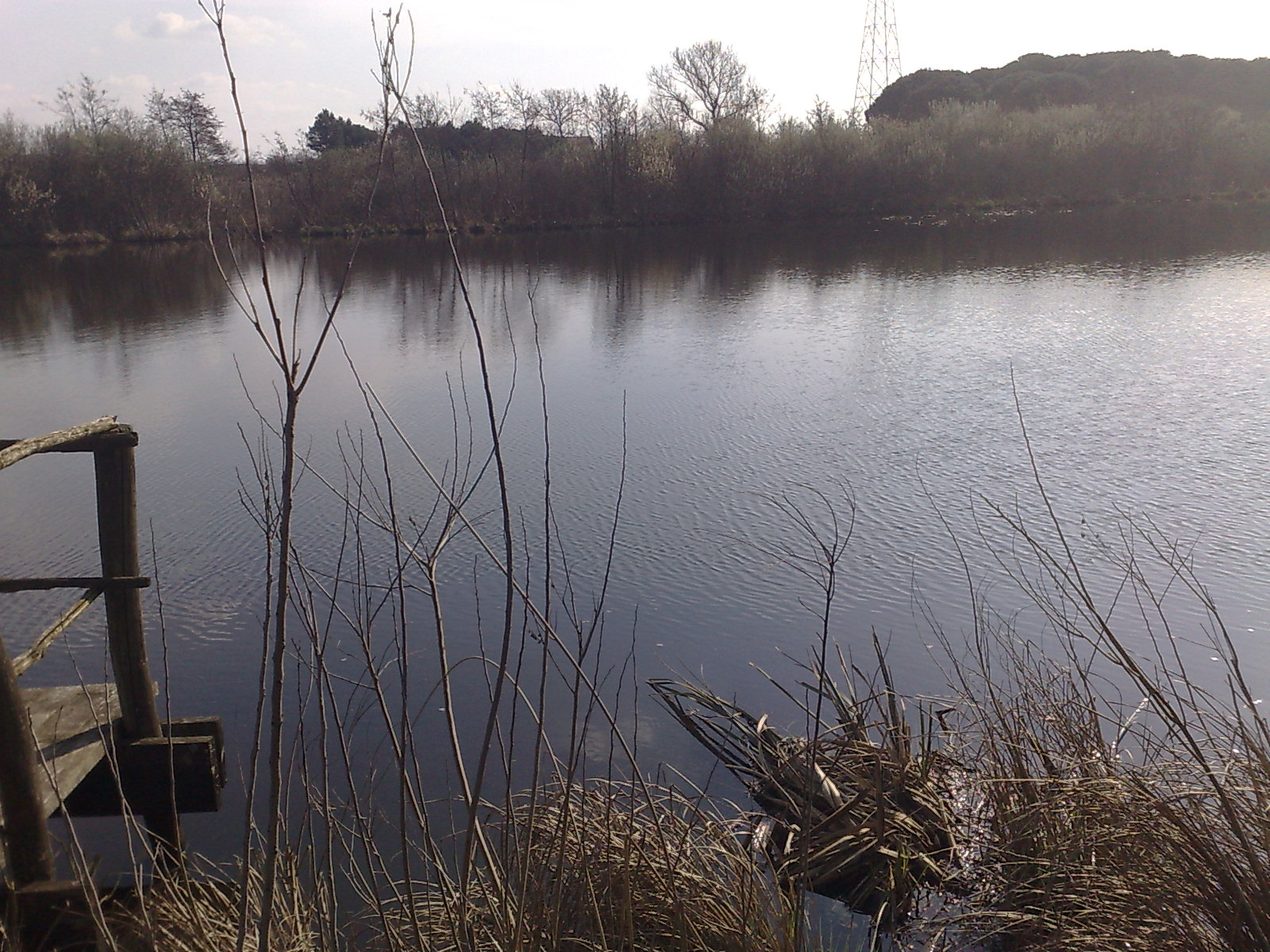

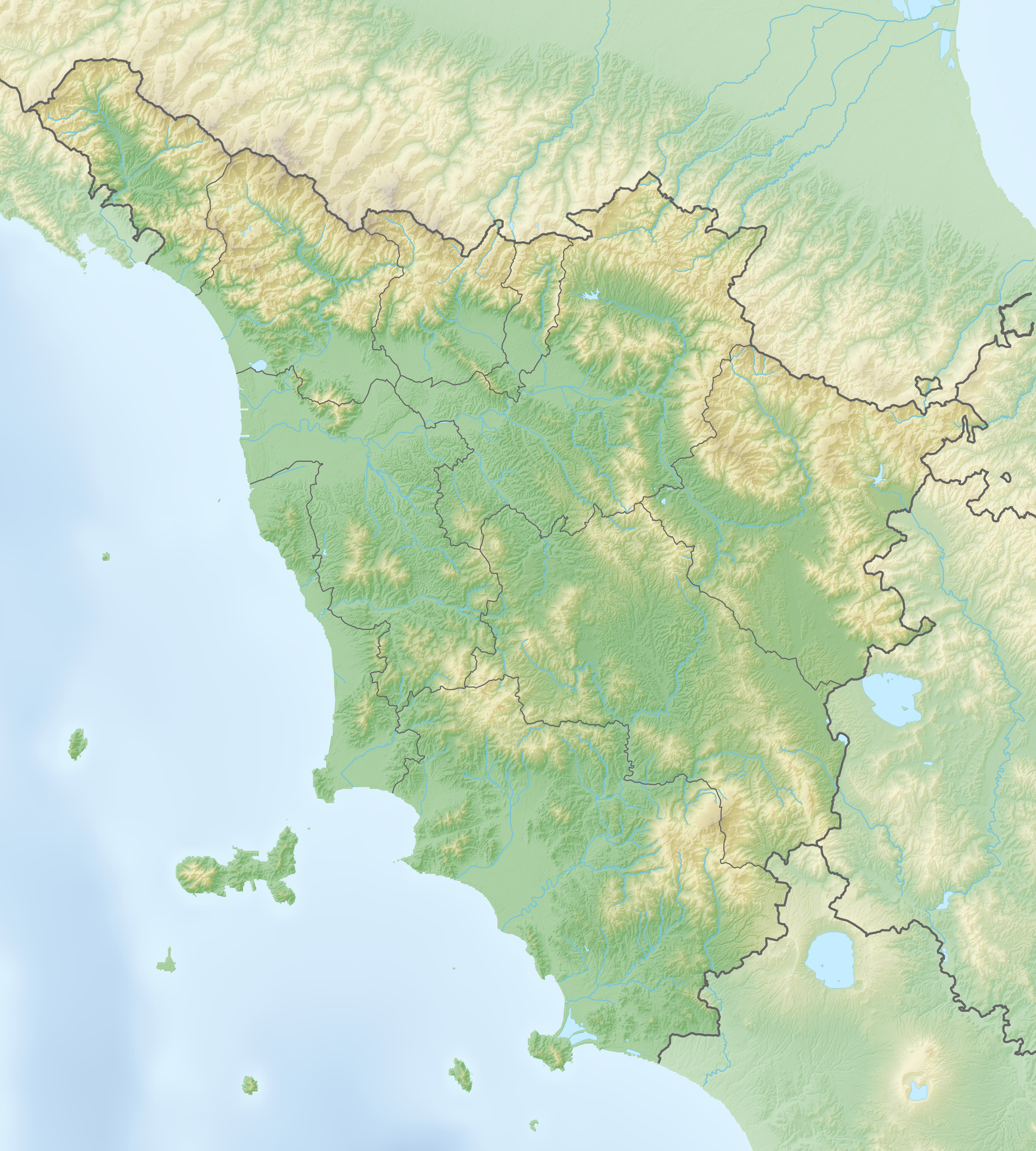
- Location within Tuscany
- Location: Province of Lucca, Tuscany
- Coordinates: 43°49′30.41″N 10°42′5.47″E
- Basin countries: Italy
- Surface area: 0.012 km^{2} (0.0046 sq mi)

Lago di Sibolla (Lake Sibolla) is a small freshwater lake and nature reserve located in the municipality of Altopascio, within the Province of Lucca, Tuscany, Italy. Recognized as a wetland of international importance under the Ramsar Convention, it is considered one of the most significant marshy biotopes in Tuscany and Europe due to its unique paleobotanical features.

== Geography and Hydrology ==
The lake is situated in the lower Valdarno, specifically in the northern part of the Bientina valley. It is a "relict" basin, representing the last undisturbed remnant of the vast marshlands that once occupied the Bientina and Fucecchio basins prior to major land reclamation efforts in the 18th and 19th centuries.

The hydrology of Sibolla is distinct; it is primarily fed by underground springs, which maintain a consistent temperature and chemical purity. This constant inflow has allowed the lake to preserve a microclimate that serves as a biological refuge for species that have otherwise disappeared from the Mediterranean region.

== Flora and Fauna ==
The site is designated as a Special Area of Conservation (SAC) under the European Union Habitats Directive. Its primary scientific value lies in the presence of rare boreo-alpine flora, which are relics from the last Ice Age.

The reserve is one of the few places in Italy where the carnivorous plant Drosera rotundifolia can still be found. Other notable species include Hottonia palustris (water violet) and Menyanthes trifoliata (bogbean).

The lake hosts the most important heronry in peninsular Italy, providing nesting grounds for over 1,000 pairs of herons and ibises, including the squacco heron and the little bittern. The wetland also supports a diverse population of insects, as well as the European pond terrapin.

== Conservation ==
The Lago di Sibolla Nature Reserve covers approximately 60 hectares. Despite its protected status, the ecosystem faces modern threats from surrounding industrial activities in Altopascio and the proximity of the A11 highway. Management plans focus on maintaining the hydrogeological balance and controlling invasive species to preserve its fragile biodiversity.
