= Lago di Caprolace =

Lake in province of Latina, Italy

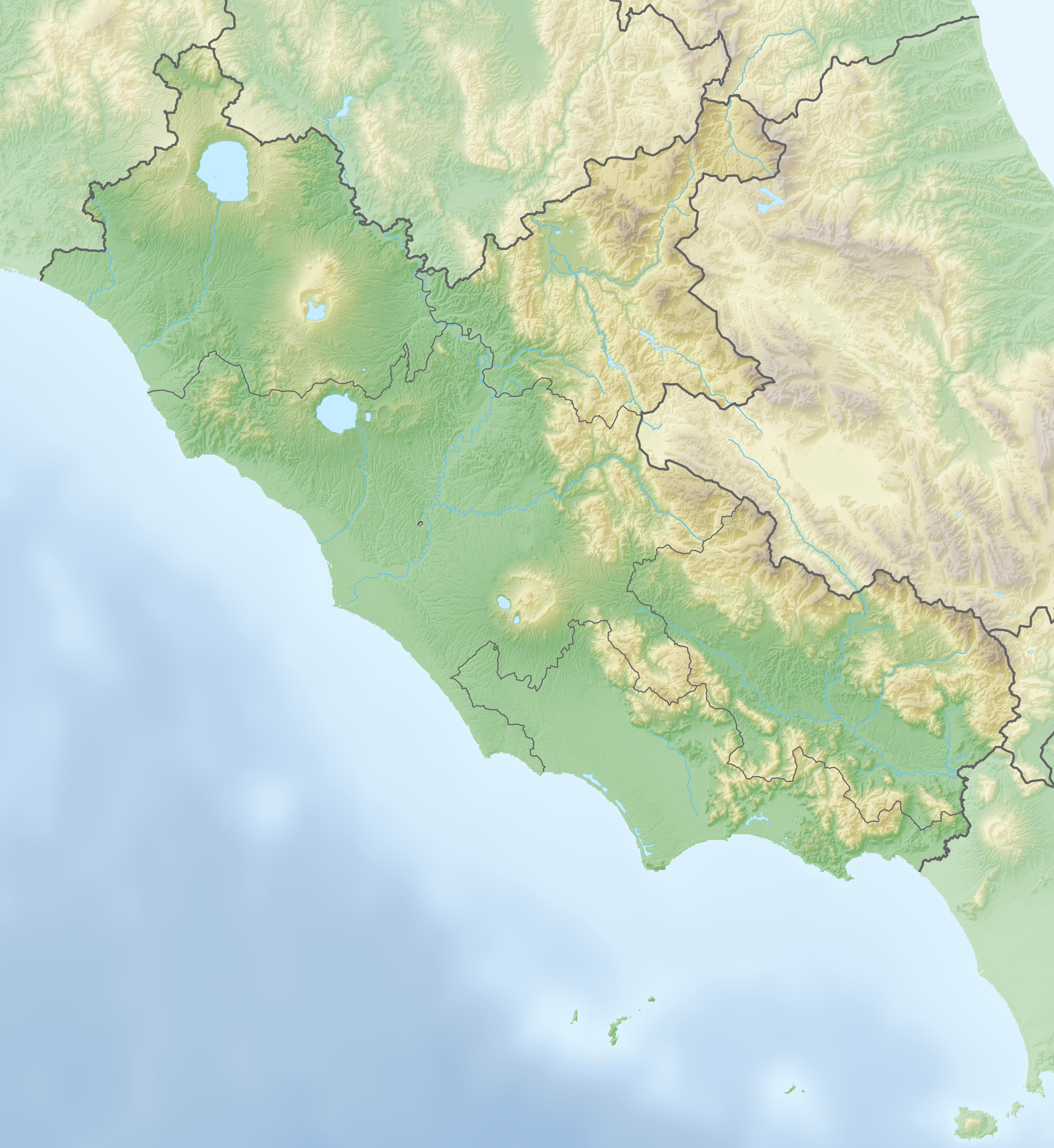
- Location within Lazio
- Location: Province of Latina, Lazio
- Coordinates: 41°21′00.68″N 12°58′29.64″E
- Primary inflows: Canale di Fossa Augusta
- Primary outflows: artificial channel
- Basin countries: Italy
- Surface area: 2.3 km^{2} (0.89 sq mi)
- Surface elevation: 1 m (3 ft 3 in)

Ramsar Wetland
- Official name: Lago di Caprolace
- Designated: 14 December 1976
- Reference no.: 129

Lago di Caprolace is a lake in the Province of Latina, Lazio, Italy. At an elevation of 1 m, its surface area is 2.3 km^{2}.
