= San Felice Circeo =

- Comune
- Comune di San Felice Circeo
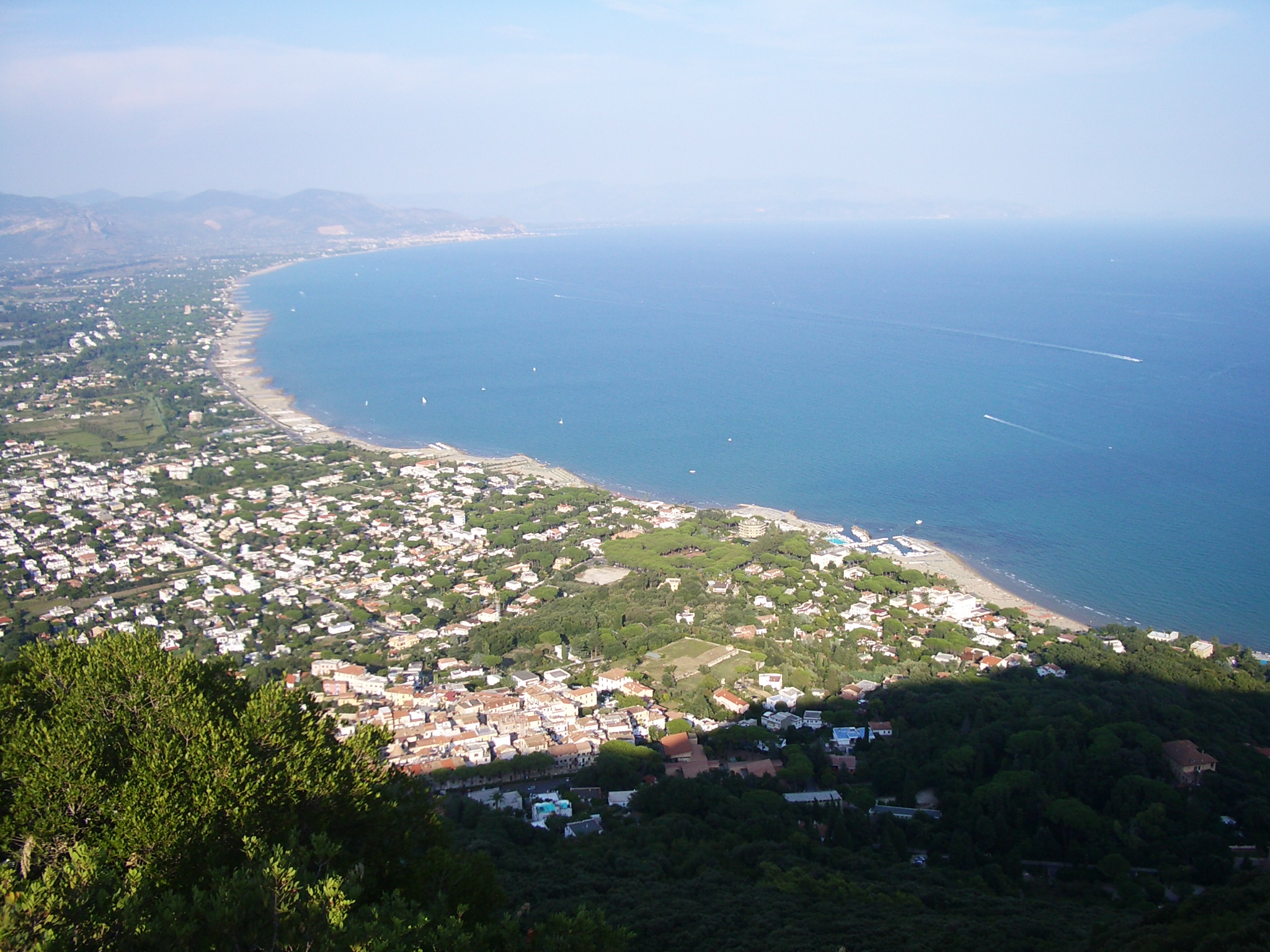
- View of San Felice Circeo

- Coat of arms

- Location within Italy Location within Lazio
- Coordinates: 41°14′20″N 13°05′47″E
- Country: Italy
- Region: Lazio
- Province: Latina (LT)
- Frazioni: Borgo Montenero, Colonia Elena, La Cona, Mezzomonte, Pantano Marino, San Vito

Government
  - Mayor: Monia Di Cosimo (Civic list)

Area
  - Total: 32.63 km^{2} (12.60 sq mi)
- Elevation: 98 m (322 ft)

Population (31 May 2015)
  - Total: 10,018
  - Density: 307.0/km^{2} (795.2/sq mi)
- Demonym: Sanfeliciani
- Time zone: UTC+1 (CET)
  - Summer (DST): UTC+2 (CEST)
- Postal code: 04017
- Dialing code: 0773
- ISTAT code: 059025
- Patron saint: San Felice Martire
- Saint day: July 29
- Website: Official website

San Felice Circeo is a town and comune in the province of Latina, in the Lazio region of central Italy. It was an ancient city called Circeii. It is one of I Borghi più belli d'Italia ("The most beautiful villages of Italy").

It is included in the Circeo National Park. Sites include the Grotta Guattari, one of the oldest Neanderthal sites in Italy, in which remains of nine Neanderthals were discovered.

Capo Circeo Lighthouse is 3 kilometres (1.9 mi) from the old town.

== History ==
In the treaty signed between Carthage and Rome in 509 BC, the Carthaginians agreed not to harm Circeii.

In 209 BC, during the Second Punic War, Circeii was one of twelve Latin colonies to refuse any more military contributions towards Rome and in 204 it was severely punished as a result, by furnishing double the greatest number of foot soldiers they had ever provided and 120 horsemen, all chosen from the wealthiest of the inhabitants, and to be sent out of Italy. Also an annual tax was imposed.

The Roman Triumvir Lepidus was exiled here after his fall in 36 BC by his former colleague, and future Emperor, Octavian.

In September 1975 the so-called Circeo massacre took place in San Felice Circeo, the rape of two young women, one of whom was also murdered, which received significant media attention in Italy.
