= Pontine Marshes =

Former marshland near Rome, Italy

Coordinates: 41°28′N 12°54′E

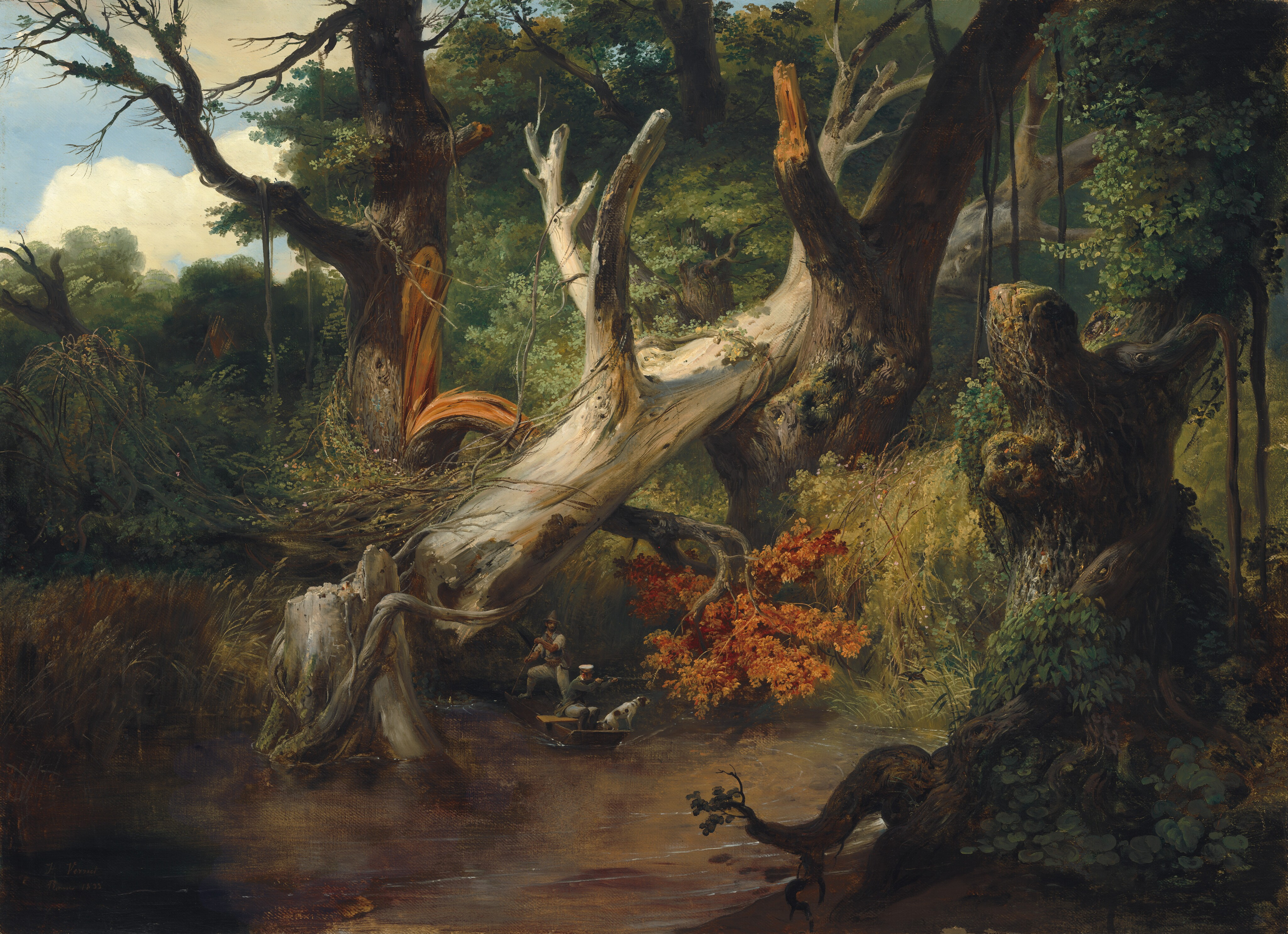
Hunting in the Pontine Marshes, oil on canvas by Horace Vernet, 1833

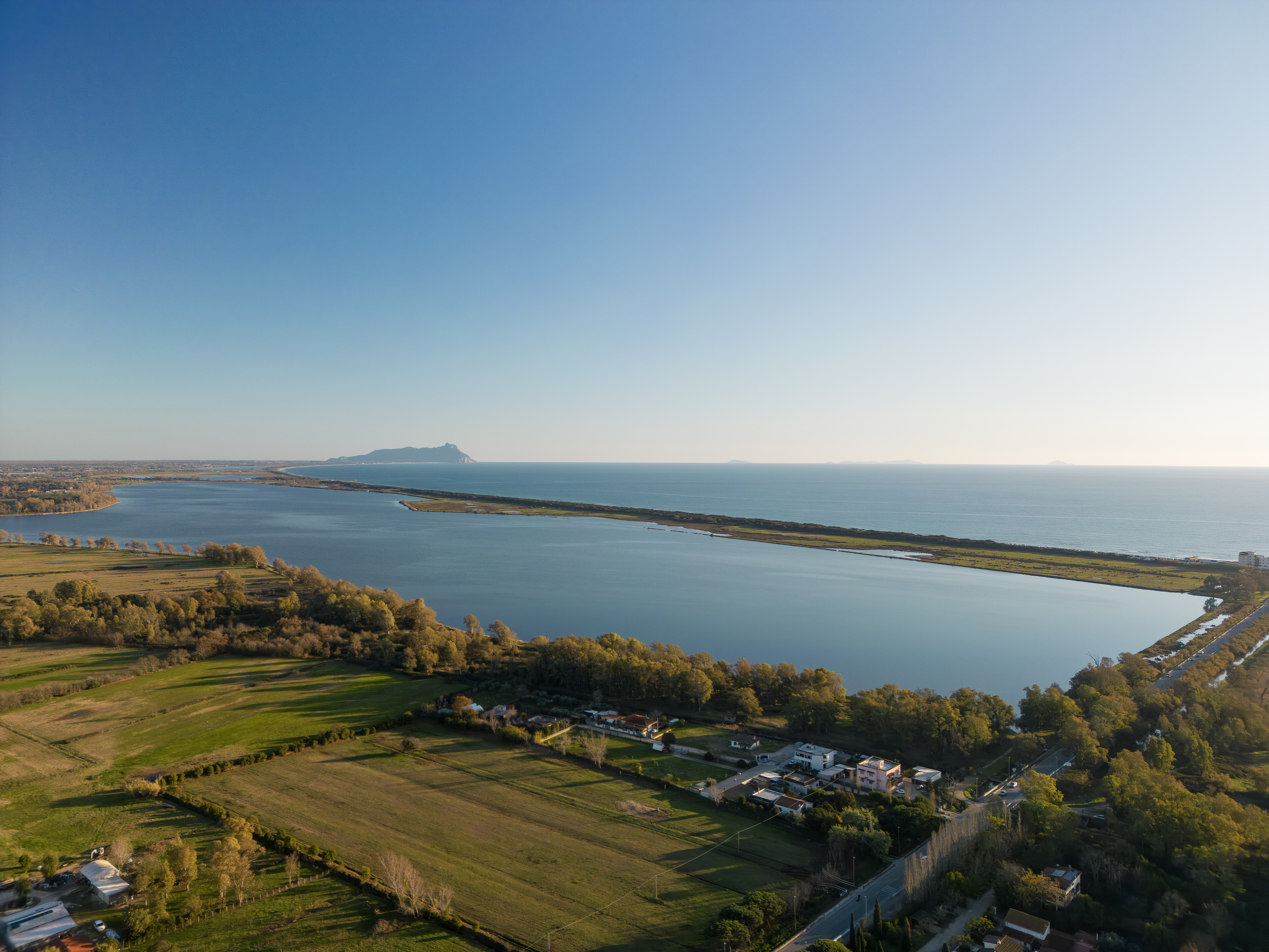
Lake Fogliano, a coastal lagoon in the Pontine Plain

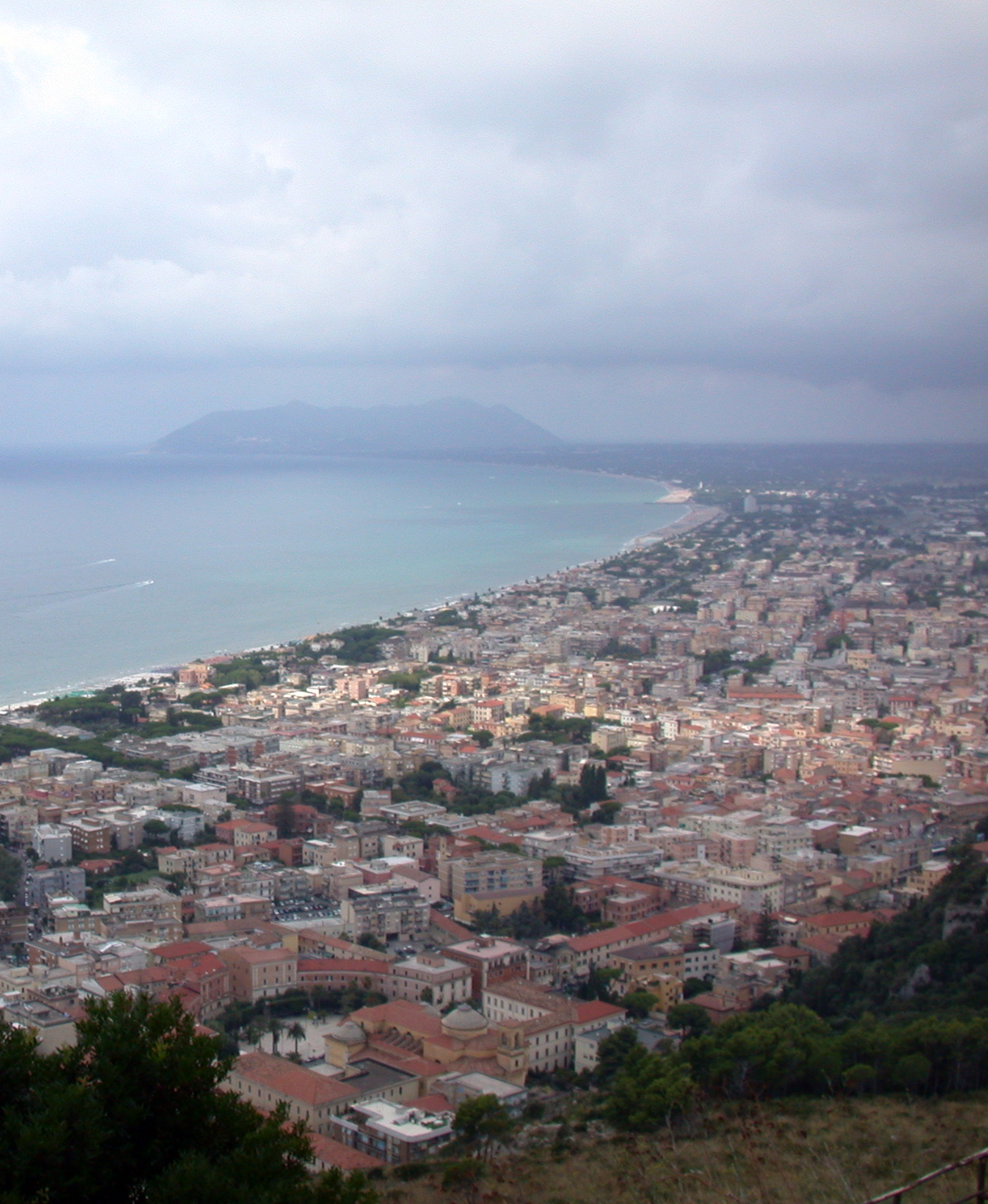
Terracina today, looking northward at the promontory: the former marsh to the right of it stretches over the horizon. In the lower right corner, the Volscian Mountains descend to the edge of the narrow strip on which Terracina is situated.

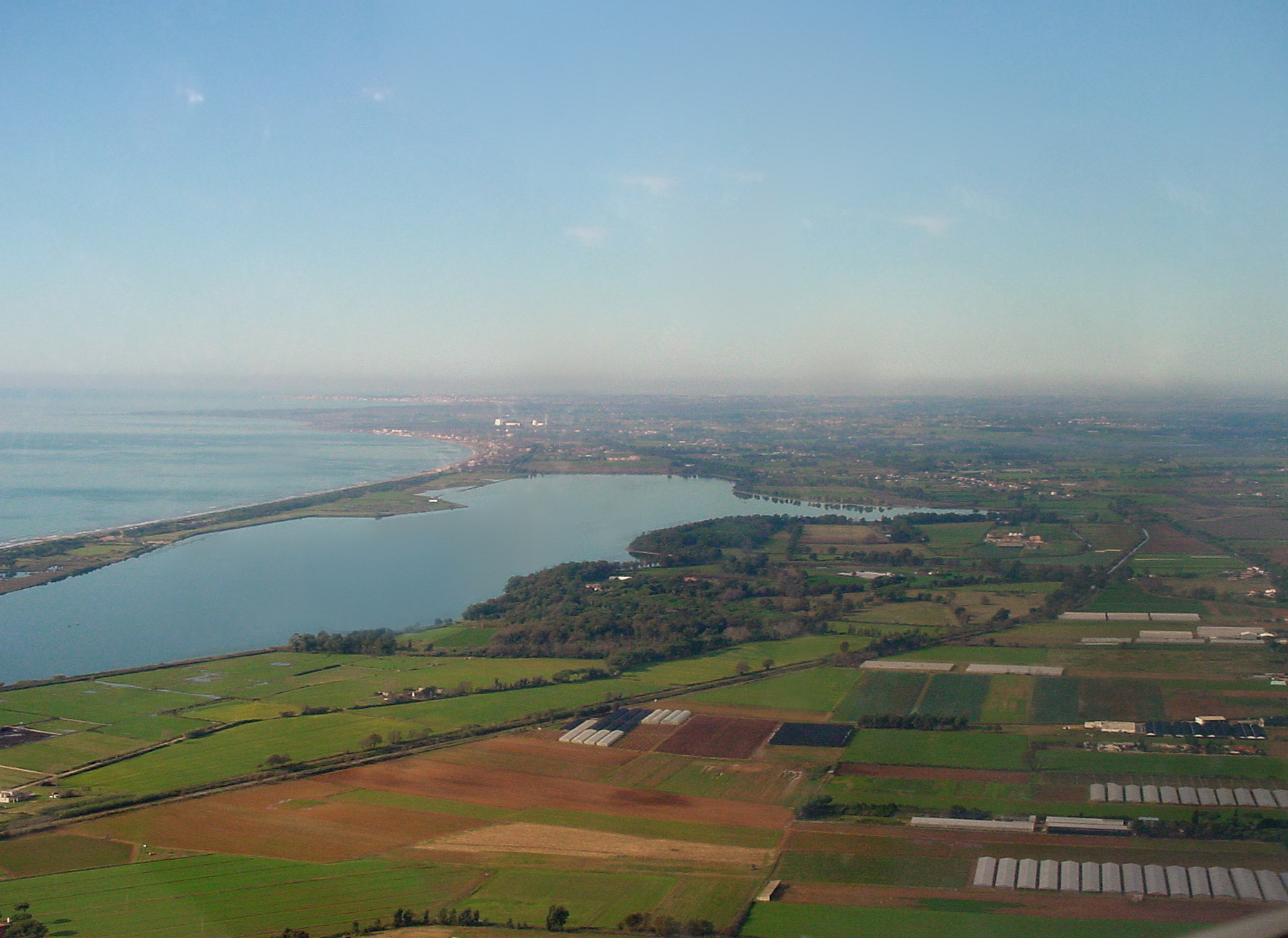
National Park of Circeo, on the coast of the Pontine Fields: the view is an aerial photograph. Visible in the foreground is Lago di Fogliano, one of the laghi costieri, "coastal lagoons".

The Pontine Marshes (/ˈpɒntaɪn/ PON-tyne, US also /ˈpɒntiːn/ PON-teen; Italian: Agro Pontino [ˈaːɡro ponˈtiːno], formerly also Paludi Pontine; Latin: Pomptīnus Ager [sg.] by Titus Livius, Pomptīna Palūs [sg.] and Pomptīnae Palūdēs [pl.] by Pliny the Elder) is an approximately quadrangular area of former marshland in the Lazio Region of central Italy, extending along the coast southeast of Rome about 45 km (28 mi) from just east of Anzio to Terracina (ancient Tarracina), varying in distance inland between the Tyrrhenian Sea and the Volscian Mountains (the Monti Lepini in the north, the Monti Ausoni in the center, and the Monti Aurunci in the south) from 15 to 25 km (9 1/2 to 15 1/2 mi). The northwestern border runs approximately from the mouth of the river Astura along the river and from its upper reaches to Cori in the Monti Lepini.

The former marsh is a low tract of mainly agricultural reclaimed land created by draining and filling, separated from the sea by sand dunes. The area amounts to about 80,000 hectares (200,000 acres). The Via Appia, a Roman military road constructed in 312 BC, crosses the inland side of the former marsh in a long, straight stretch flanked by trees. Before then, travelers had to use the Via Latina along the flanks of the mountains; Terracina could not be reached across the marsh.

Further southward along the coast as far as Minturno is another stretch of former coastal marsh called the South Pontino, the largest section being between Terracina and Sperlonga, as far inland as Fondi. It was part of ancient Latium adiectum and still belongs to Lazio. Bordered by the Aurunci Mountains, this land is mainly reclaimed, as well, but the more frequent incursion of hills permitted more dense settlements. Leaving Terracina, the Via Appia crosses it, as well.

The marsh was an extensive alluvial plain at about sea level (some above, some below) created by the failure of the streams draining the mountains to find clearly defined outlets to the sea through the barrier dunes. Above sea level, it was a forested swamp; below, it was mud flats and pools. Sparsely inhabited throughout much of their history, the Pontine Marshes were the subject of extensive land reclamation work performed periodically. The tribe of the Volsci began with minor draining projects in the vicinity of Tarracina in connection with their occupation of it in the pre-Roman period.

The road proved difficult to keep above water. Under Augustus, a compromise was reached with the construction of a parallel canal. The part of the marsh above sea level was successfully drained by channels, and new agricultural land of legendary fertility came into being. Whenever the channels were not maintained, the swamp reappeared. Meanwhile, frequent epidemics of malaria at Rome and elsewhere kept the reclamation issue alive. Under Benito Mussolini's regime in the 1930s, the problem was nearly solved by placing dikes and pumping out that portion of the marsh below sea level. It continues to need constant maintenance. Italian confidence in the project was so high, the city placed by Mussolini in 1932 in the center of the marsh, Latina, formerly named Littoria, became the capital of a new province, Latina.

== Geology ==
The Agro Pontino geologically is one of four geomorphic divisions of a somewhat larger area, the Pontine Region, also comprising the Monti Albani, the Volscian Mountains and Monte Circeo; in short, all of Roman Latium. The marsh itself was located in Latium Novum, the eastern part of the region, which the Romans removed from the sovereignty of the Volsci. The two terms create some confusion in the literature, as the region was often heavily settled, but the marsh supported no resident population.

=== Pliocene ===
The underlying landform is a horst–graben, in which expansion of the crust causes a section to drop, creating a rift valley. Underneath the marsh is such a valley, while the steeply-sided Volscian Mountains and the floor under the outer dunes are the corresponding horsts. The graben was formed over a period approximated by the end of the Pliocene about 2.588 million years ago. The natural outcome of this graben topography was the creation of outer barrier islands and a lagoon that gradually filled with runoff sediment transported from the mountains.

=== Pleistocene ===
The rift valley remained a depression in the Tyrrhenian Sea for about two million years and then in the Tuscolano-Artemisio phase, dated 600–360 thousand years BP, a series of volcanic changes began leading to the current landform: the first four eruptive cycles of a new volcano in the vicinity of the Monti Albani, which spread pyroclastic rock and formed a caldera. In the Campi di Annibale phase, 300–200 thousand years BP, a stratovolcano formed in the caldera. Approximately contemporaneously, in the Middle Pleistocene, 781–126 thousand years BP, beds of sand and clay, termed the Latina Complex, appeared above sea level over the outer karst, enclosing a lagoon. The beaches survive at the Latina Level from about 560 thousand years BP.

The Tyrrhenian II transgression of ocean water into the lagoon left the Minturno level and complex, a dune barrier of about 13 m (43 ft), dated 125–100 thousand years BP. Behind the beach, deep peat and clay deposits alternating with alluvial sediments evidence the lagoon. It was deepest at the Terracina end diminishing to the surface at Cisterna, where beds of travertine, sand fused by volcanic activity, reach the surface. At this time, Latium Vetus had been formed as a volcanic land mass, while Latium Novum was a lagoon, the future marsh.

The Tyrrhenian III transgression left the Borgo Ermada Complex and Level, about 90 thousand years BP. It consisted of elongated sand ridges parallel to the shore, 8 to 15 m (26 to 49 ft) high. During the regression phase, fluvial incisions indicate by then at very latest, the lagoon was totally enclosed. After it drained, aeolian (wind-driven) sand covered the notches.

At around 22 thousand years BP, the volcanic complex became active for the last time, erupting in hydromagmatic explosions that created the beds of Lakes Albano and Nemi, both crater lakes.

=== Holocene ===
The most recent beach, the Terracina Complex and Level, which began the Holocene about 11700 years BP, was a single ridge behind which clay, peat, and peaty clay were being deposited at sea level. No land was yet above it. The region was a shallow lagoon interspersed with marshland. Fluvial incisions in the beach let out the excess water, which was brackish and contained salt-water mollusks, leading to the question of where the excess water came from and why alluvial fans had not buried the region. The answer is in the composition of the Volscian Mountains, which are limestone, porous, and excessively cracked and faulted. All but the heaviest rainfalls sink into the rock only to appear as a large volume of spring and groundwater at the foot of the mountains. Transport of sediment was minimal. In one estimate, 20 m^{3}/s (710 cu ft/s) flow from springs over a distance of 20 km (12 mi). In another estimate, 80% of the rain falling on the Monti Lepini is absorbed, with a single spring at Ninfa exuding 2,000 L/s (71 cu ft/s). These facts explain why the main fill of the lagoon is peat, silt, and clay, and not thicker-grained alluvial deposits, and why it took so long.

Alluvial deposits known as the Sezze Fan began about 4000 BC in the marsh below Sezze. The increased rainfall required to move the sediment is attributed to the Atlantic Period, a time of warmer and moister climate dated around 5000–3000 BC. Pollen from the marsh indicates the replacement of mixed oak by alder and willow. The modern rivers incised the marsh: the Ufente, the Sisto, and the Amaseno, which had shifting rather than stable tributaries. The marsh drains to the southeast, with channels parallel to the coast, exiting between Circeo and Terracina. Although settlement on the mountain slopes began much earlier, deforestation by the Volsci began in the sixth century BC. The marsh rapidly acquired the alluvial deposits of the Amaseno Fan over the peat, bringing much of it above water. No buried soils indicate any cultivation of dry land in the marsh.

== Archaeology ==
Archaeological work on the marsh has been extensive, including surveys, excavations, and core samples. Four land systems have been defined: Fogliano coastal, the beach system; Borgo Grappa Beach Ridge, the region just inland from the beach, rather extensive in the Circeo section; the Latina Plain, the main part of the fields; and the Monti Lepini, the flank of the mountains. The center of the marsh, earlier the lagoon, although currently urban, does not provide any ancient evidence of habitation. The land (or the lake) was undoubtedly uninhabited except possibly for itinerant fowlers and fishers, but further, any evidence of human activity there would be deep in the underlying peat. In the fringes, however, most anciently at the north edge of the lagoon and in the coastal fringe, in both the Fogliano and Borgo Grappa land systems, evidence of hunting-gathering dates from the Middle Pleistocene. Evidently, man has witnessed the entire history of the lagoon and marsh from its first formation, when he hunted and fished along its shores.

=== Paleolithic ===
Paleolithic material comes from Campoverde at the north edge of the Pontino Agro. It is dated by typology, as none has been found in context. The assemblage of amateur collections of surface artifacts "shares affinities with various Lower Palaeolithic industries of Latium. Chronologically referred to the second half of the Middle Pleistocene;" that is, about 500 thousand years BP. These are primarily flint cores and 5–6 cm (2–2 1/2 in) flakes, consisting of denticulate tools, side scrapers, borers, retouched flakes, some microliths, and others. Also from Campoverde come animal bones excavated unscientifically from a trench during construction and one human tooth. The latter is too large to be of modern humans and has been assigned the genus Homo. The animals include Elephas antiquus, Mammuthus primigenius, Equus ferus, Bos primigenius, Cervus elaphus, Capreolus capreolus, and others.

A skull of Neanderthal man was found in a grotto on Monte Circeo in Italy on February 25, 1939, by a team of paleontologists headed by Alberto Carlo Blanc dating to about 65 thousand years BP. On May 8, 2021, 9 Neanderthal skeletons were discovered in the same cave by a team of archaeologists. The team concluded that the Neanderthals were killed by a pack of hyenas.

== History ==
=== Roman times ===
The geographers and historians of the early Roman Empire describe the marsh.

Livy reported that after the Secessio plebis of 494 BC, a strike by the common people for political rights, a famine occurred at Rome due to decreased economic activity. Grain buyers were sent to "the people of the Pomptine marshes" and elsewhere to acquire new supplies, but were met with refusal. The Volsci attempted to exploit this momentary weakness by raising an army of invasion but were struck down by an epidemic, of what sort, or whether historians can conclude to be malaria, remains unsaid. The Romans, buying grain in Sicily, reinforced their colony at Velitrae and planted a colony at Norba, "which thus became a fortified point for the defense of the Pomptine region." In 433 BC, Rome was struck by an epidemic and again sent buyers to the Pontine, this time successfully. Apparently, at least some of the marsh was under cultivation, which the high density of Roman settlements along the two northern roads might lead one to expect.

Strabo says:

"In front of Tarracina lies a great marsh, formed by two rivers; the larger one is called the Aufidus (Ufente). It is here that the Appian Way first touches the sea ... Near Tarracina, as you go toward Rome, there is a canal that runs alongside the Appian Way, and is fed at numerous places by waters from the marshes and the rivers ... The boat is towed by a mule."

In Strabo's view, Latium extends south of Tarracina to Sinuessa. Through the marsh, with reference to the Via Appia and the Via Latina, "the rest of the cities of Latium ... are situated either on these roads or near them, or between them." He lists a number of settlements of the Monti Lepini Land System, from southeast to northwest: Setia, Signa, Privernum, Cora, Pometia, and a number of others in the north of the Roman Campagna on the Via Latina.

Pliny the Elder's statement on the topic of the marshes:

"Another marvel not far from Circello is the Pomptine Marsh, a place that Mucianus, who was three times consul, has reported to be the site of 24 cities. Then comes the river Aufentum, above which is the town of Tarracina ..."

is notable for what it does not say, which is the names and locations of the cities. Many more than 24 Roman settlements were built in the marsh, but it is not possible to find 24 of the size of Terracina or Antium without counting Latium Vetus or the coastal lands south of Terracina.

According to Plutarch, Julius Caesar had ambitious plans for the marsh, which if realized or realizable would have diverted the Tiber through it:^{[how is this implied by the source? "besides this" suggests a separate point being introduced]}

"During the expedition [a planned campaign around Europe] he intended ... to receive the Tiber immediately below the city in a deep cut, and giving it a bend toward Circaeum to make it enter the sea by Tarracina, ...besides this he designed to draw off the water from the marshes about Pomentium and Settia, and to make them solid ground, which would employ many thousands of men in the cultivation ..."

=== Renaissance ===
In 1298, Pope Boniface VIII had a canal dug to connect the Ninfa River with the Cavata River, which drained much of the land in the Dukedom of Sermoneta, recently bought by his nephews. The increase in water in the Cavata caused severe flooding in the marsh near Sezze. Before he died in 1447, Pope Eugene IV attempted to solve the now-longstanding water dispute between Sermoneta and Sezze by digging another canal to connect and control the rivers of those regions, but the project ended when he died.

Pope Leo X, a Medici, proposed to finish the project but was opposed by the Duke of Sermoneta over the fishing rights. In 1514, he decided to drain the region around Terracina instead, assigning the task to his brother Giuliano de Medici, commander of the papal army. The Medicis would retain all reclaimed land. In 1515, Giuliano hired Leonardo da Vinci to design the project. It provided the Ufente River with outlets through the Canale Giuliano and Canale Portatore. Giuliano died in 1516, and the city of Tarracina combined with Sermoneta and Sezze to halt work, over the issue of property rights. The people of the marsh were not going to allow the Medicis to take their land.

Popes Martin V, Sixtus V, and Pius VI all attempted to solve the problem. Pius VI reconstructed the road. In 1561, Pope Pius IV employed the services of the mathematician Rafael Bombelli, who had gained a reputation as a hydraulic engineer in reclaiming marshland in the Val di Chiana in the Tuscan Apennines, but the project also came to naught.

The ambitious Sixtus V also made unsuccessful attempts at reclamation of the area and died of malaria after a visit to the Pontine Marshes.

=== 18th century ===
On February 17, 1787, Johann Wolfgang Goethe visited the region with his painter-friend Johann Heinrich Wilhelm Tischbein. He reports in his book, The Italian Journey, that they "have never seen so bad of an appearance as they are usually described in Rome". Goethe became interested in the dewatering attempts, after observing that it is "a large and extensive task". He probably used this image in this scene in his Faust II, Act V: "A marsh extends along the mountain-chain, That poisons what so far I’ve been achieving; Were I that noisome pool to drain, 'Twould be the highest, last achieving. Thus space to many millions I will give. Where, though not safe, yet free and active they may live.{{citation needed}}"

=== 19th century ===
Mount Circeo, as seen from Terracina in a painting by Giovanni Costa (1896), with the Pontine Marshes in the foreground

Near the end of the 19th century, a Prussian officer, Major Fedor Maria von Donat (1847–1919), had an idea; he would build a channel that followed the base of the mountains, cutting through a sand dune at Terracina. This would collect the water flowing from the mountain before it reached the lowest levels where it stagnated. The water collected in the canal system would then be pumped into the Mediterranean. The electricity needed to power the canal system would be collected through dams in the mountains with hydroelectric power plants. The German patent office patented the project under the number 17,120. He expected to dry out the marshes within a five-year time span.

Major von Donat published his idea in Rome and Berlin, and succeeded in gaining the attention of Emil Rathenau, the general manager of AEG in Berlin. Rathenau saw market potential for electric investments, so he and some industrialists in Berlin, as well as private financiers, created the "Pontine Syndicate Ltd" in 1900. Seventy million gold marks were set aside for the project. (With one mark being five grams of pure silver, the amount is equivalent to $17.5M in 1900 US dollars.) One of the conditions was that the Italians would have to match the funds on the project.

In 1898, Fedor von Donat resigned from his position as battalion commander and moved to Rome with his family. There, he lobbied the government for his project, as well as four large landowners, connections in financial circles, and the Vatican. He leased 95 hectares (240 acres) of the marsh near Terracina and established a model farm, "Tenuta Ponte Maggiore". With the help of waterwheels of ancient Egyptian type, revolved by three oxen, he was able to prove that the moorland had a high percentage of organics in its soil, of over 70 points; this proved that three harvests per year were possible. He protected his 80 workers from malaria with a daily dose of quinine. He invited Roman journalists to a press conference on his property. In 1902, large German newspapers, as well as foreign papers, carried long articles about the project. They often carried a sense of national pride about the development project. Donat argued above all for the extermination of malaria in the countryside surrounding the capital. Malaria prevented the expansion of Rome to the south, the settling of which could provide a new province for Italy without a colonial war. The urbanization of the marshes could prevent emigration of 200,000 Italians. Around 1900, one could count fewer than 1,000 inhabitants for a coastal region larger than 700 km^{2}. By a law passed in 1899, the proprietors were bound to arrange for the safe outlet of the water from the mountains, keep the existing canals open, and reclaim the district exposed to inundation, for a period of 24 years.

Donat's plan failed. This time it was not the technical inadequacy as with the predecessors, but political deliberations that stood in the way of the project. The liberal government hesitated and gave the North preference, where large marshes in the valley of the Po also needed to be reclaimed. Violent resistance by the four large property owners in the Pontine Marshes was the reaction to the necessary expropriation and leasing to the German syndicate of a large part of their marsh country. The cofinancer, the Banca Commerciale in Milan, delayed starting the task. Donat, whose lobbying had operated on his own funds, exhausted his wife's fortune of 75,000 gold marks by 1903. Unsuccessful, he returned to Germany. The Pontine Syndicate was dissolved on September 4, 1914. With it, a premature but bold attempt at a transnational investment to gain more land ended.

=== 20th century ===
In 1928, the population of the marshes was 1,637. They were people who lived in shanties across the fields, herded, practiced agriculture, and were in poor health most of the time. The Italian Red Cross related that, during the malaria season, 80% of those having spent one night in the marsh became infected.

==== Bonifica integrale ====
Starting in 1922, the Italian government's Department of Health, working with the Opera Nazionale Combattenti, (Note: It was a veteran's organization, founded in 1917 and reformulated in 1923 and 1926. One of its functions was to find land for veterans.) developed a new initiative to combat malaria called the bonifica integrale. (Note: Although Giuseppe Tassinari, the party's agricultural expert, attributed the terms to Mussolini, they were developed by the Department of Health, 1917–1923. Snowden 2006, p. 150.) It featured three stages, the first being the bonifica idraulica, which would drain the swamp and control the waters. Mussolini and his party called it "the battle of the swamps" because it required the recruitment, deployment, and supply of an army of workers. In the second stage, the bonifica agraria, homesteads with stone houses and public utilities were to be constructed and the land was to be parcelled among settlers. The third stage, bonifica igienica, took measures against the mosquitos (Anopheles labranchiae), such as screens and whitewash (so the mosquitos could be easily identified and killed), and against malaria, such as distributing quinine and setting up health services.

In 1922 also, Benito Mussolini was made prime minister by the king. In 1926, the Department of Health undertook a pilot project of the new strategy in the delta of the Tiber River, reclaiming land and creating 45 new homesteads with great success, after which Mussolini climbed aboard. At his request to the Director-general of the Department of Health, Alessandro Messea submitted a plan for the Pontine Marshes. In 1928, Mussolini brought it before parliament; it became "Mussolini's Law", and began to be implemented in 1929. In 1939, at the incorporation ceremony of the last new city, Pomezia, the project was declared complete.

Beginning in 1930, the bonifica idraulica cleared the scrub forest, (Note: Mainly Quercus suber, Q. robur, shrubby Olea europaea, Erica arborea, and Myrtus species) constructed a total of 16,500 km (10,300 mi) of checkerboard canals and trenches, dredged rivers, diked their banks, filled depressions, and constructed pumping stations to change the elevation in the canals where necessary. The final channel, the Mussolini Canal, empties into the Tyrrhenian Sea near Anzio. The project reached a peak in 1933 with 124,000 men employed. The previous agrarian population was moved out under protest in the name of progress. Workers were interned in camps surrounded by barbed wire. The camps were overcrowded, wages were low, hours were long, food was bad, sanitation was poor, healthcare was missing, and medical attention was lacking. Workers could quit, however, and turnover was high. In 1935, at the completion of the phase, they were all dismissed without notice. Many were infected with malaria.

The government placed about 2,000 families (most from northern Italy) in standardised but carefully varied two-storey country houses of blue stucco with tiled roofs. Each settler family was assigned a farmhouse, an oven, a plough and other agricultural tools, a stable, some cows, and several hectares of land, depending on local soil fertility and the size of the family. Mussolini used the 10-year operation for propaganda purposes, and was often photographed between workers, shirtless with a shovel in his hand, or threshing wheat at harvest time; these occasions were regularly filmed by the Istituto Luce for inclusion in nationally shown propaganda newsreels.

The new towns of Littoria (1932, now Latina), Sabaudia (1934), Pontinia (1935), Aprilia (1937), and Pomezia (1939) were founded, side by side with several other small borghi (rural villages).

==== Battle of Anzio ====
On September 8, 1943, Italy changed sides in World War II, the king having already issued an order for Mussolini's arrest. Rescued by the Germans, Mussolini became the head of the Republic of Salò, a puppet regime over northern Italy. The defense of Italy and the suppression of its insurgent population were left to the Wehrmacht. After the loss of Sicily, they successfully defended the Gustaf Line south of the marshes, necessitating an Allied landing at Anzio and Nettuno in an effort to outflank the Germans. Malaria had returned to the Agro Pontino: quinine and other medicines were in short supply or withheld by the Germans, the food was bad, a shortage of metal prevented repair of the screens, and veterans returning from the Balkans brought back resistant strains of the disease.

The Germans stopped the pumps and opened the dikes, refilling the marsh with brackish water. They were being advised by the German malariologists Erich Martini and Ernst Rodenwaldt that the return of the salt water would encourage the return of the Anopheles labranchiae mosquito, which thrives in salty environments. The water would also destroy agriculture, removing essential supplies of food and fresh water from the vicinity, an act that had minimal military effect but devastated the population. Although it is true that the bog impeded movement of heavy equipment, the Germans did not flood the marsh for that reason; the equipment under heavy shelling from some of the largest artillery pieces the Germans had was going nowhere, anyway. The flooding was an act of biological warfare and was opposed by Italian former colleagues of the Germans in malariology, but someone on Kesselring's staff—unknown to this day—issued the order.

The allies and the Germans equally, therefore, found themselves fighting in a mosquito-infested bog. The new homes were being used as refuges for infantry and cover for tanks. Ernie Pyle relates:

On these little farms of the Pontine marshes Mussolini built hundreds of ... stone farmhouses ... Now and then I saw a farmer plowing while German shells landed right in his field. We tried to evacuate people ... But some of them simply refused to leave their homes. Sometimes the Germans would pick out one of the farmhouses, figuring we had a command post in it, I suppose, and blow it to smithereens. Then, and only then, did some Italian families move out ... on any side road we couldn't drive five minutes without seeing the skeleton of a cow or a horse.

==== Agro Pontino ====
The Battle of Anzio left the marsh in the state of devastation; nearly everything Mussolini had accomplished was reversed. The cities were in ruins, the houses blown up, the marshes full of brackish water, the channels filled in, the plain depopulated, the mosquitos flourishing, and malaria on the rise. The major structures for water control survived, and in a few years, the Agro Pontino was restored. In 1947, the province of Littoria, created by Mussolini, was renamed to Latina. The last of the malaria was conquered in the 1950s, with the aid of DDT.

Today, a duct system runs through the dried-out area. Wheat, fruit, and wine grapes are cultivated in the Pontine region. The "Agro Pontino" is a flourishing landscape with modern cities with both prewar and postwar architecture. By 2000, about 520,000 inhabitants lived in this formerly deserted region. However, without constant vigilance, dredging the canals, and repairing and updating the pumps all of this can be undone. The specter of distant problems remains: the prospect of chemical pollution of the environment, DDT-resistant mosquitoes, and medicine-resistant strains of malaria.

== See also ==
- Cisterna di Latina
- Geography of Italy
- Province of Latina
- Lake Fogliano

== Bibliography ==
- LaRosa, M.; Mazza, P.; Rustioni, M. (2001), "The elephant remains from the Agro Pontino, Latina, Central Italy", The World of Elephants (PDF), Rome: Sovraintendenza del Comune di Roma
- Linoli, Anatolio (2005), "Twenty-six Centuries of Reclamation & Agricultural Improvement on the Pontine Marshes", in Ohleg, Christof (ed.), Integrated Land and Water Resources Management in History (PDF), Schriften der Deutschen Wasserhistorischen Gesellschaft (DWhG) Sonderband 2, DWhG, pp. 27–56, archived from the original (PDF) on 2011-07-16
- Snowden, Frank M (2006). The Conquest of Malaria: Italy, 1900–1962. New Haven: Yale University Press.
- Van Joolen, Ester (2003). "Chapter 1, Introduction" ( (PDF)). Archaeological land evaluation: a reconstruction of the suitability of ancient landscapes for various land uses in Italy focused on the first millennium BC (Dissertation). Groningen, Netherlands: University of Groningen. Archived from the original on 2011-09-28.
- Van Joolen, Ester (2003). "Chapter 3, Landscape reconstruction and description of the research areas: Salento Isthmus, Pontine region, and Sibaritide Land systems: landforms and soils" ( (PDF)). Archaeological land evaluation: a reconstruction of the suitability of ancient landscapes for various land uses in Italy focused on the first millennium BC (Dissertation). Groningen, Netherlands: University of Groningen. Archived from the original on 2012-02-25.
- Graf von Hutten-Czapski, Bogdan (1936). 60 Jahre Politik und Gesellschaft. Berlin: E. S. Mittler. OCLC 19955938.
- Stewart-Steinberg, Suzanne (May 2016). "Grounds for reclamation: fascism and postfascism in the Pontine Marshes". differences: A Journal of Feminist Cultural Studies. 27 (1). Duke University Press: 94–142. doi:10.1215/10407391-3522769.
