= Fico Tower =

- Torre Fico (Italian)
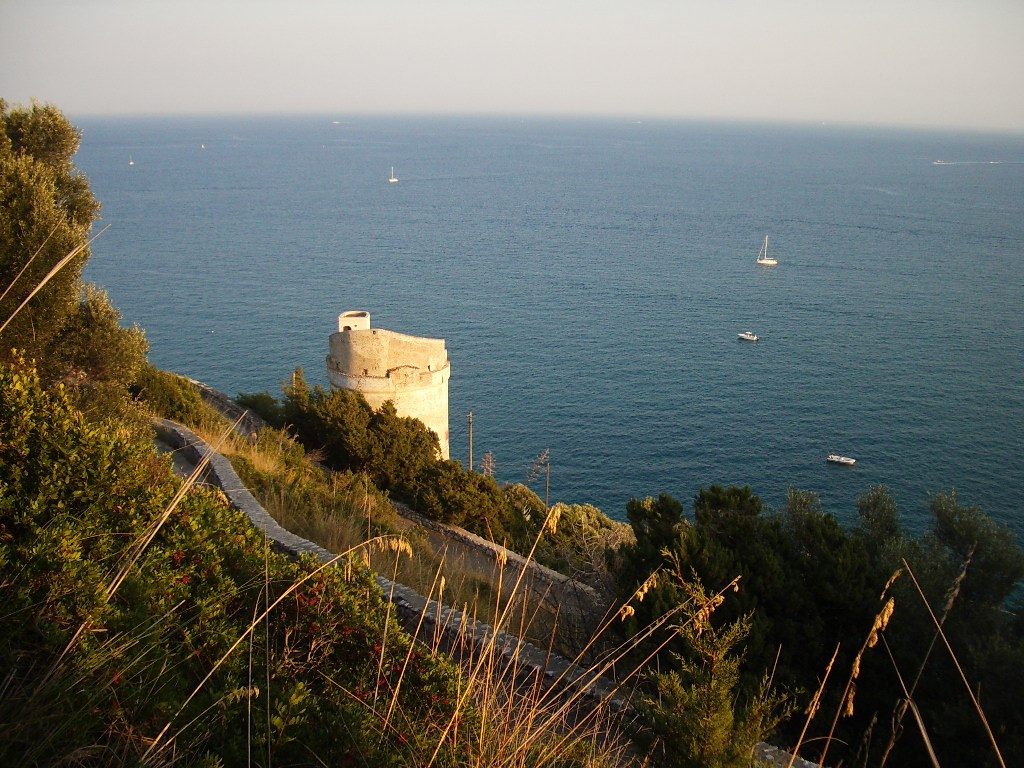
- Fico Tower in San Felice Circeo
- Click on the map for a fullscreen view

General information
- Location: San Felice Circeo, Italy
- Coordinates: 41°13′28.08″N 13°05′22.17″E

The Fico Tower (Italian: Torre Fico) is a historic coastal tower in San Felice Circeo, Italy.

== History ==
First built in 1563, it is one within a first group of four coastal watchtowers, also including the Paola Tower, the Moresca Tower and the Cervia Tower, built on the coast of Mount Circeo to protect the area from Saracen pirate raids. Their construction was ordered by Pope Pius IV who in 1562 issued a brief entrusting the lords of Sermoneta and San Felice with this task. The name of the tower likely originates from the abundant presence of prickly pear cacti, called fichi d'India in Italian, which still cover the rocky wall where it is located.

The tower was destroyed by the British in 1809 during the Napoleonic Wars. Pope Pius VII ordered its reconstruction in 1816, which was achieved the following year.

== Description ==
The building is located on the easternmost point of the Mount Circeo headland overlooking the beach below and the Gulf of Gaeta to its east. The tower has a circular plan.
