= Giovanni Battista Costa =

Giovanni Battista Costa may refer to:

- Giovanni Battista Costa (bishop) (1650–1714), Roman Catholic prelate and Bishop of Sagone
- Giovanni Battista Costa (painter, fl. c. 1670) (fl. c. 1670), Italian painter, active in Milan
- Giovanni Battista Costa (painter, born 1833) (1833–1893), Italian painter, active in Florence

== See also ==
- Giovanni Costa (disambiguation)
