= Grotta delle Felci =

Cave and archaeological site in Italy

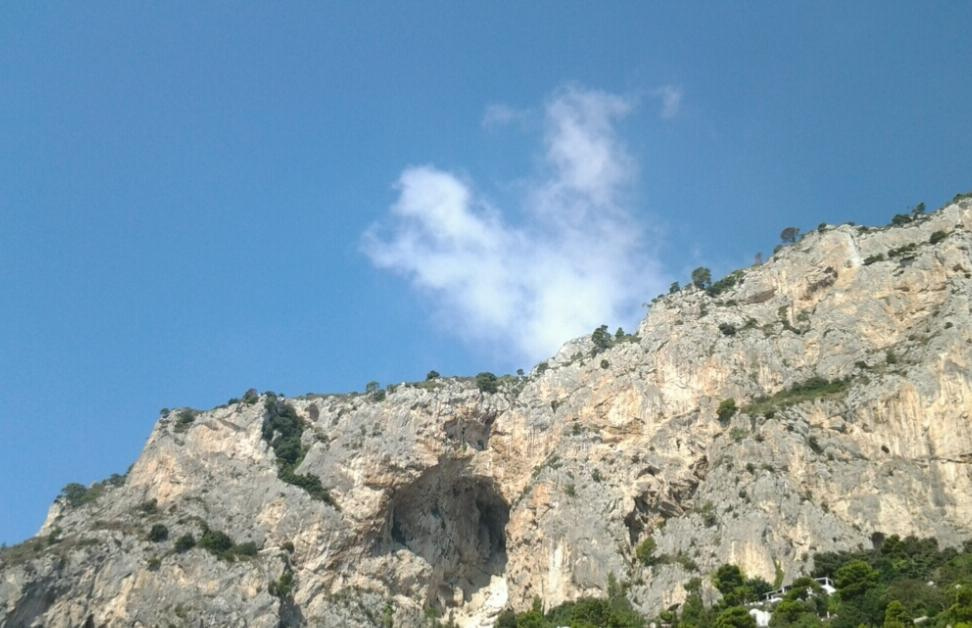

- Location within Italy
- Location: Capri, Campania, Italy
- Coordinates: 40°32′50″N 14°13′58″E
- Geology: Sea cave
- Entrances: 1

The Grotta delle Felci (Italian for "Fern Grotto") is a cave located on one of the oldest regions on the island of Capri, in Campania, Italy. The cave, overlooking the sea on the southern side of the island, is located about 200 metres above sea level. The cave is 370 square metres in volume, and has been extensively excavated since the 19th century.

Excavations on the cave were first begun in 1882 by Ignazio Cerio. Some of the remains from these excavations are kept at the Centro Caprense: Ignazio Cerio Museum, and the Museum of Anthropology of the University of Naples. 549 archaeological findings and fossils have been found internally, many of which have been dated to the Neolithic period.

== History ==
From the archaeological research already undertaken at the Grotta delle Felci, human life seems to have been present in the cave from at least the Neolithic Period. Some of the ceramics found in the lower levels of the cave, suggests that the Grotta delle Felci may have been used as a burial chamber.

The cave was given the name of the "Fern Grotto", due to the large number of Maidenhair Ferns which are prevalent on the island of Capri, particularly so in the area surrounding the mouth of the cave.

As previously mentioned, the cave was first excavated by Ignazio Cerio during the 19th century in 1882, identifying the Grotta delle Felci as being of interest to archaeologists. The cave was then subject to further explorations by Ugo Rellini in 1921-22, where more Bronze Age and Neolithic pottery was located. One of the more significant finds, was from an excavation by Alberto Carlo Blanc, who led a team from the Italian Institute of Palaeontology in 1941. The remains of a small Cervid (deer) was found, and identified to be from the Upper Pleistocene period. The deer was identified as having a type of dwarfism, which was endemic to Capri, suggesting that by the Upper Pleistocene period Capri was separated from the mainland.

More recently, there have been further excavations during 1975 by the Speleological Group of the CAI Naples, and a research project titled C.A.P.R.I.3 in 2014, reinvestigating some of the excavations from the 1940's.

Findings from these excavations are mainly held at the Centro Caprense: Ignazio Cerio Museum and the Museum of Anthropology of the University of Naples, however there are also some pieces held in the British Museum.

== Archaeological finds ==
Over the several excavations which have been carried out in the Grotta delle Felci, there have been 549 archaeological finds which have been made, dating potentially from the Palaeolithic period. Around 500 pebbles have been found with anthropomorphic paintings on them, which were found during Blanc's 1941 excavation. These are likely to have been largely from the Neolithic period, however were also seen by Palaeolithic/Mesolithic hunter-gatherers using Azilian techniques, where art was made on small pebbles with extremely small tools.

There are also the remains of obsidian tools and blades which have been found within the cave, dating back to the Neolithic and Bronze Ages, some of which are currently held in the British Museum. These blades had a mixture of straight and serrated edges.

There are also ceramic vases and pieces of pottery which have been excavated, which can be used to infer that some sort of ceremonies were potentially undertaken in the caves. This is further supported by the presence of cups and basins, which would have been commonly used in ceremonies. The Trichrome painted ceramics towards the lower levels of the cave have been associated with at least 6 other burials, and this painting technique is often seen in the Serra d'Alto cultures. This alongside the human remains, suggests that the Grotta delle Felci was likely to have been used in religious burials.

Some jewellery has also been excavated from the caves, including a limestone bracelet, and a small jewel.

== Transport ==
The Grotta delle Felci is currently only accessible on foot. There are public buses which can take you to the Marina Piccola, and from there follow the path along the Grotta delle Felci. The path will narrow, until it reaches the Grotta dell'Arco, which you can continue to follow to reach the Grotta delle Felci.

== See also ==
- Grotta del Pisco
