= Grotta del Pisco =

Cave in Italy

Coordinates: 40.5488°N 14.2231°E

The Grotta del Pisco is a cave on the southwestern side of the island of Capri, Italy. Impasto ware fragments found at the Anacapri site are from the Copper Age. Gaudo culture artifacts were identified here and at the Grotta delle Felci.
