= Paola Tower =

Historic coastal tower in San Felice Circeo, Italy

- Torre Paola (Italian)
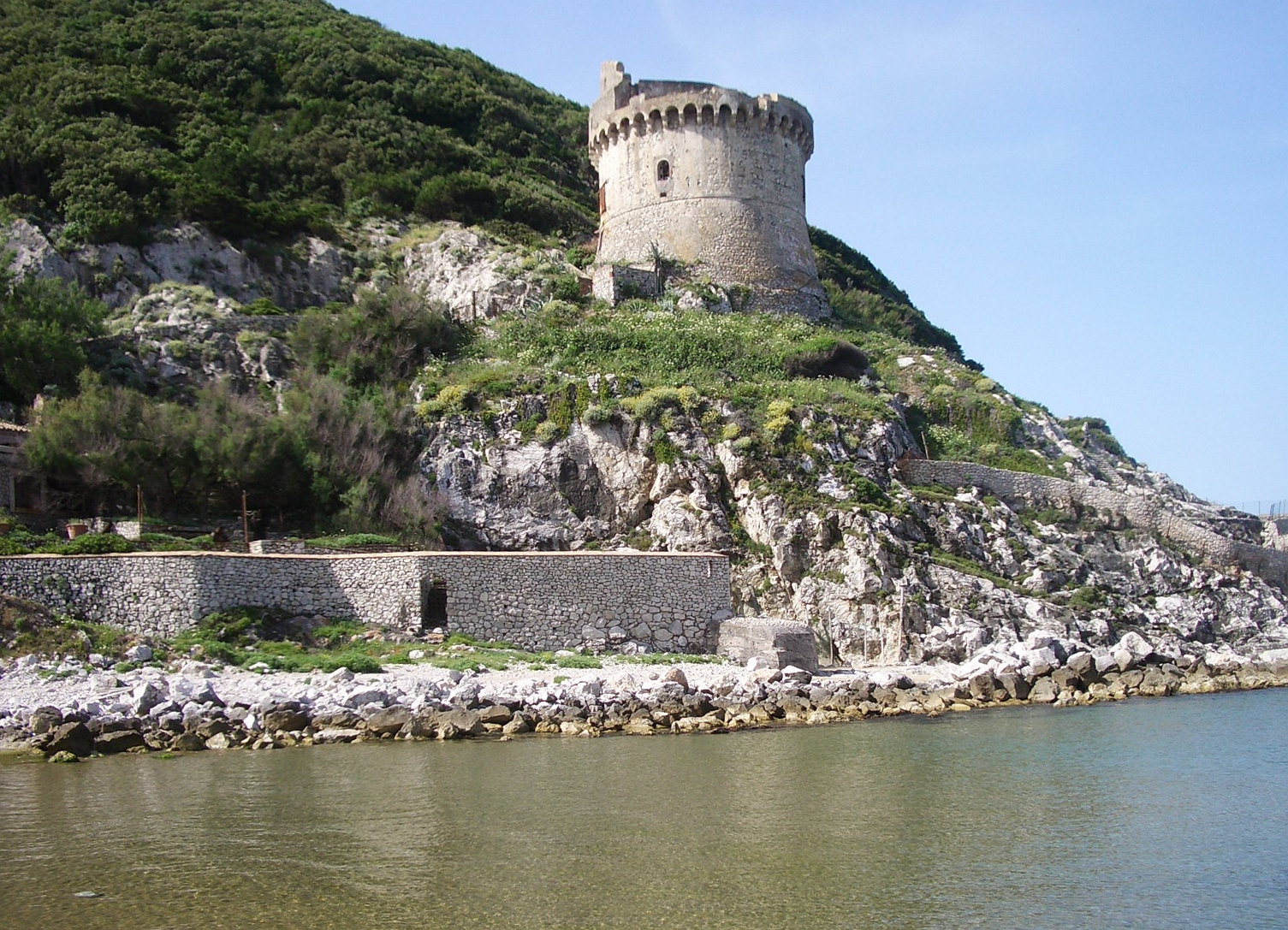
- Paola Tower in San Felice Circeo
- Click on the map for a fullscreen view

General information
- Location: San Felice Circeo, Italy
- Coordinates: 41°14′46.37″N 13°02′05.49″E

The Paola Tower (Italian: Torre Paola) is a historic coastal tower in San Felice Circeo, Italy.

== History ==
Built in 1563, it is one within a first group of four coastal watchtowers, also including the Moresca Tower, the Cervia Tower and the Fico Tower, built on the coast of Mount Circeo to protect the area from Saracen pirate raids. Their construction was ordered by Pope Pius IV who in 1562 issued a brief entrusting the lords of Sermoneta and San Felice with this task.

The tower was attacked by the British in 1809 during the Napoleonic Wars. Differently from other watchtowers on Mount Circeo, the tower repelled the attack and avoided major damages or demolition under the lead of its commander, Ubaldi Piemontese.

== Description ==
The building is located on the westernmost point of the Mount Circeo headland overlooking the beach below and Lake Sabaudia to its west. The tower has a circular plan and is connected to a large sea cave which can also be accessed by water.

== Gallery ==
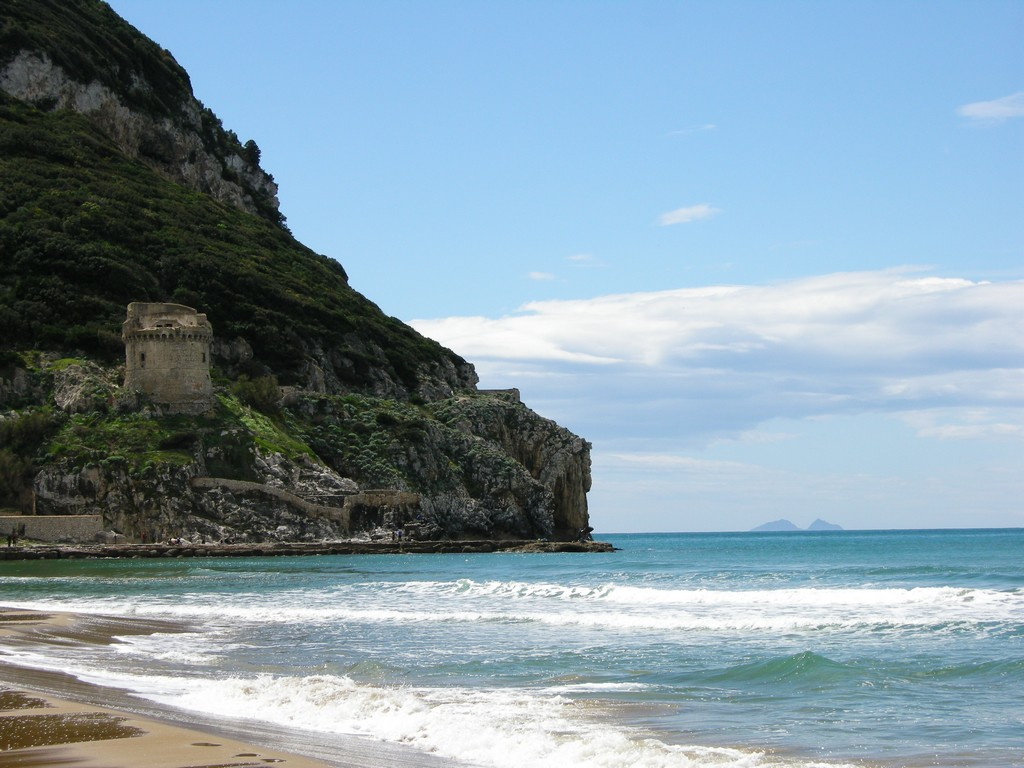

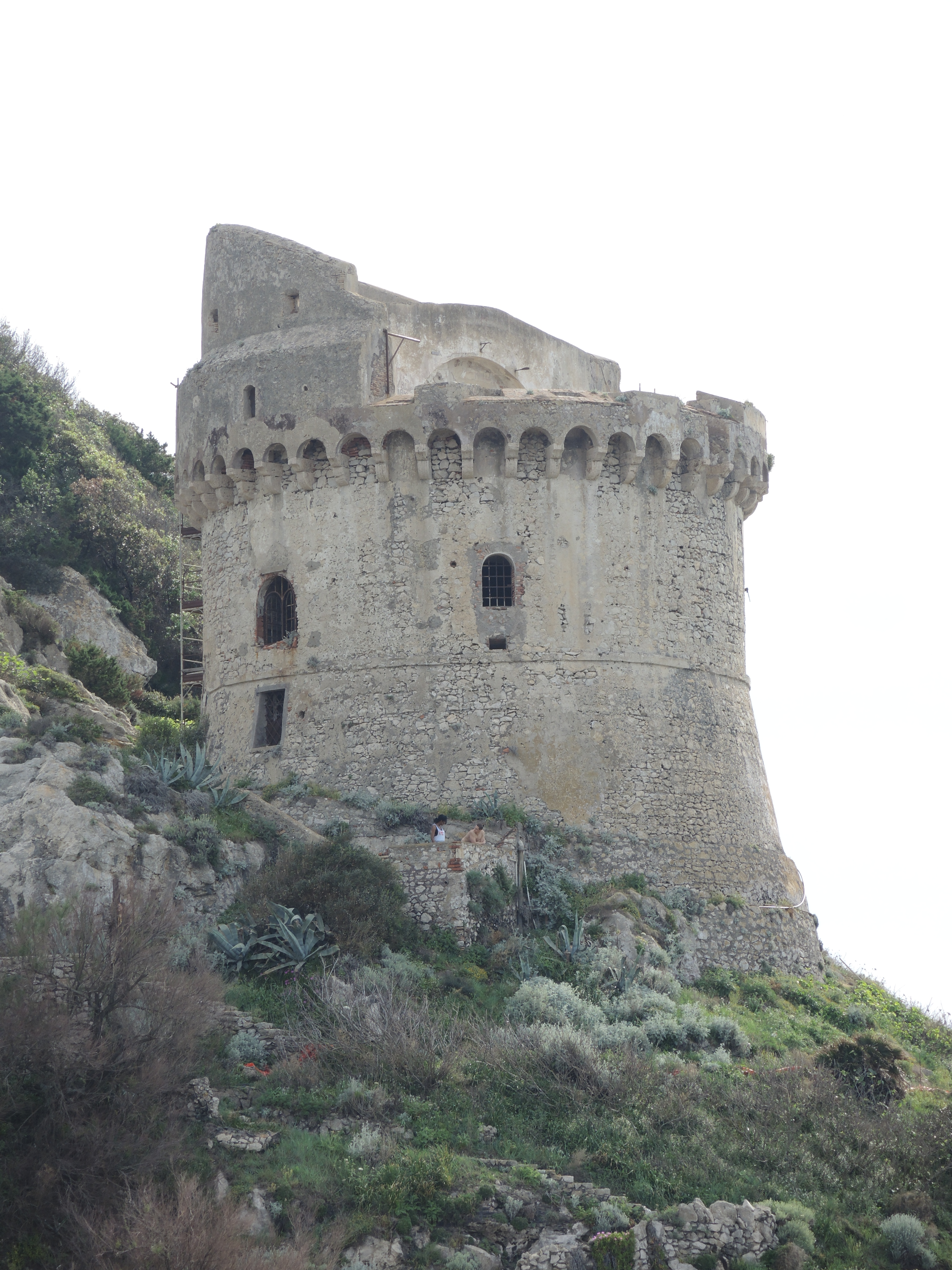

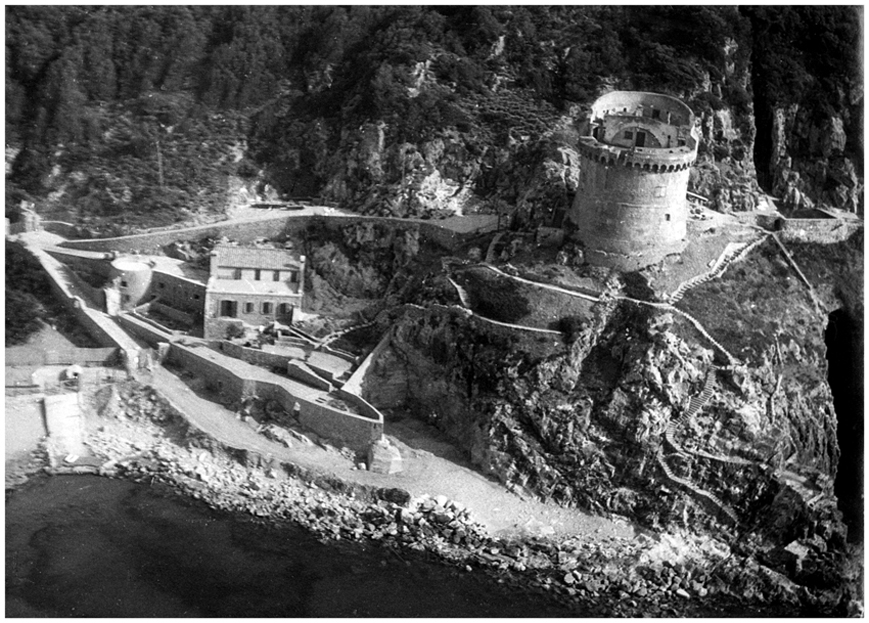
