= Mount Circeo =

Mountain in Italy

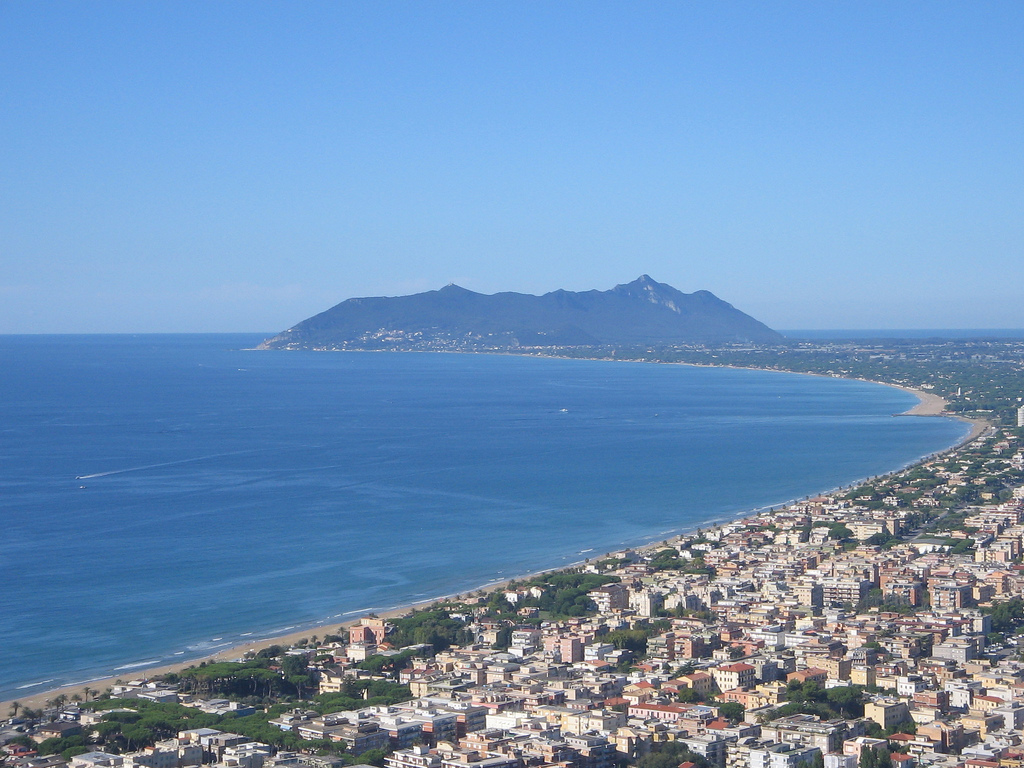
- Mount Circeo as seen from Terracina, Italy

Highest point
- Prominence: 541 m (1,775 ft)
- Coordinates: 41°14′00″N 13°03′00″E

Geography
- Location within Italy
- Location: San Felice Circeo, Lazio, Italy

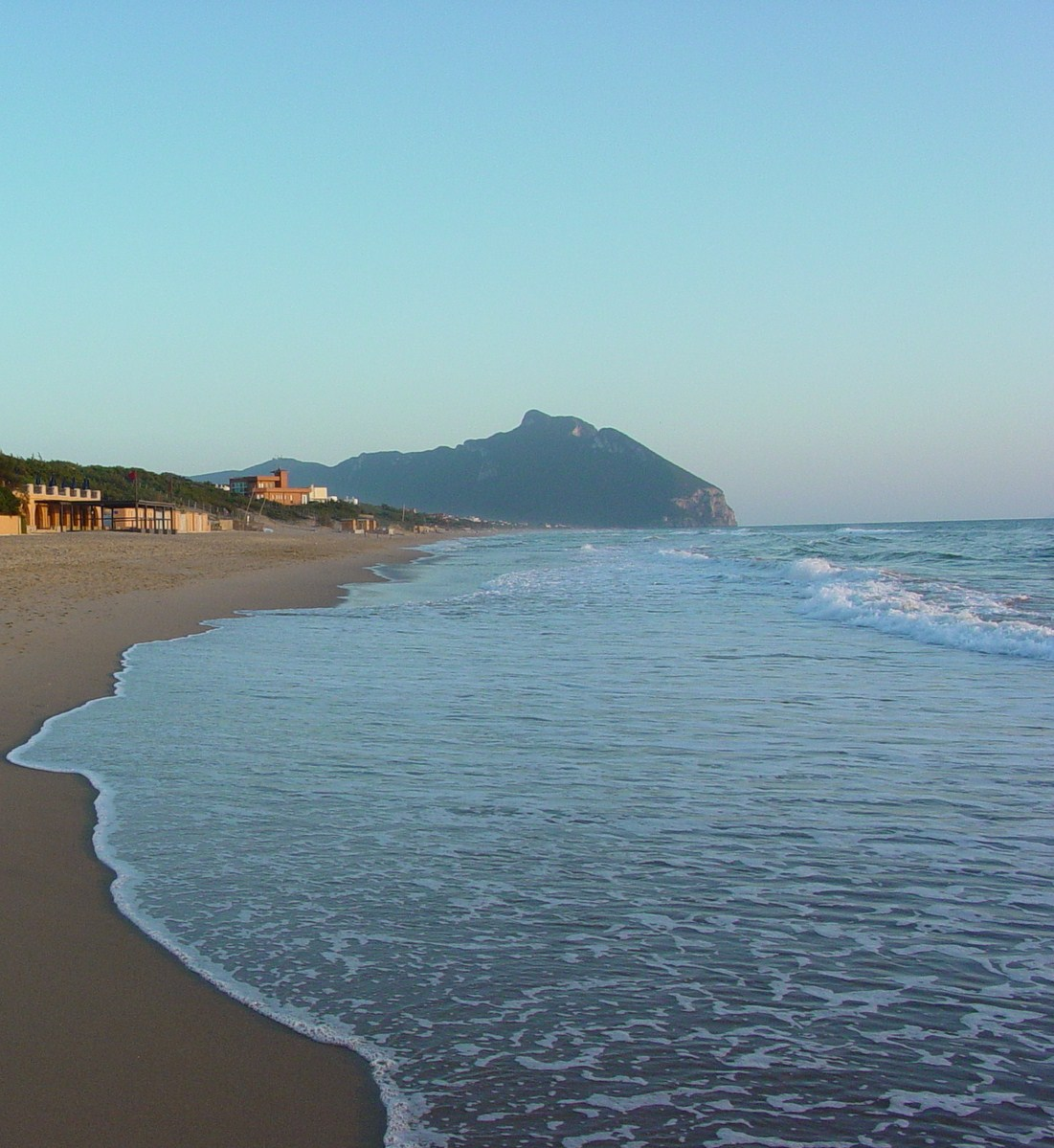
Mount Circeo as seen from the beach of dunes in Sabaudia, Italy.

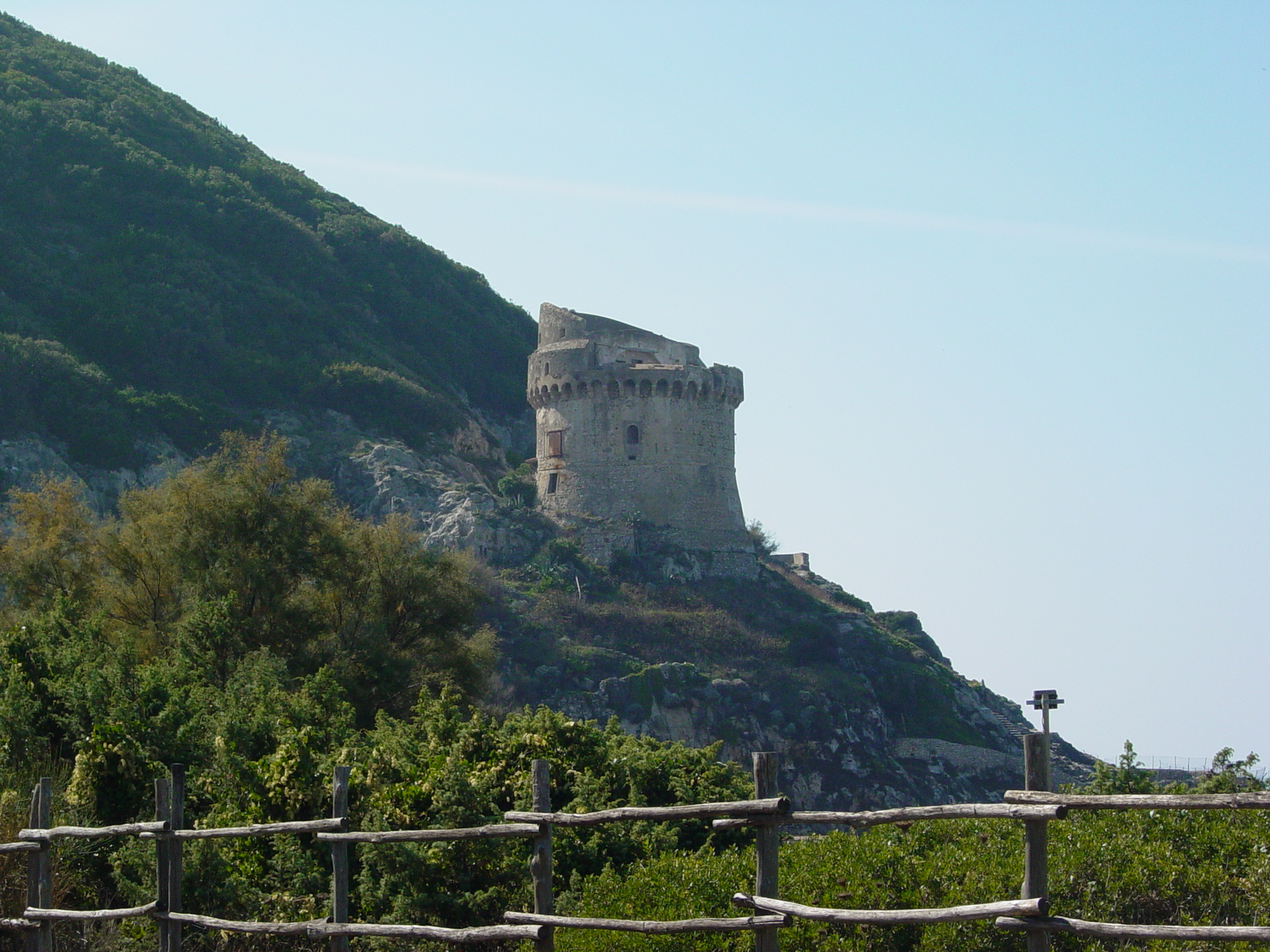
The Paola Tower at Sabaudia, a 16th-century watchtower built by will of Pope Pius IV at the west end of the promontory, guarding the canal.

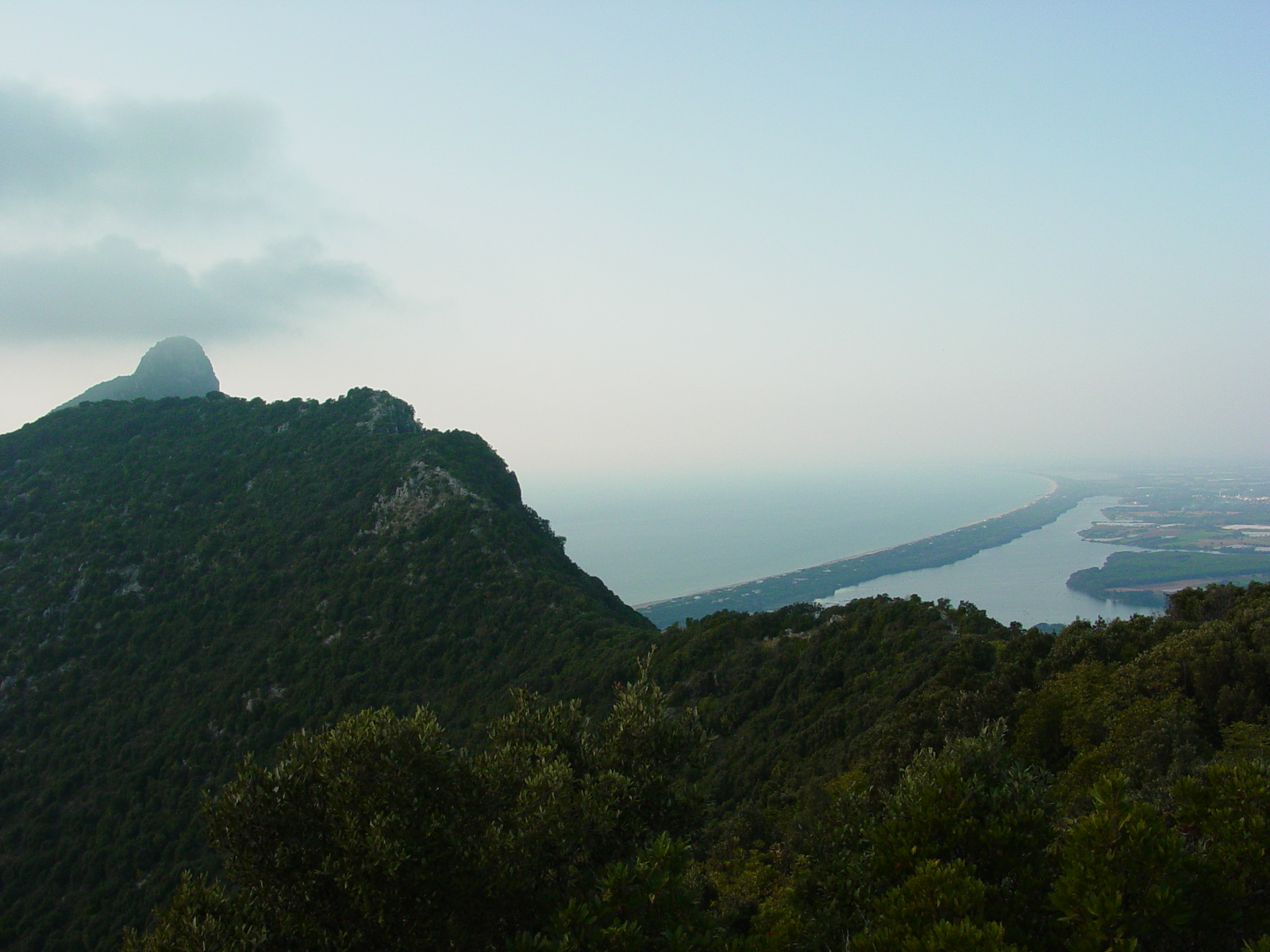
The Acropolis (High Place) of Mount Circeo as seen from the Ancient Tower Ruins with Sabaudia in the distance.

Monte Circeo or Cape Circeo (Italian: Promontorio del Circeo [promonˈtɔːrjo del tʃirˈtʃɛːo], Latin: Mons Circeius) is a mountain promontory that marks the southwestern limit of the former Pontine Marshes, located on the southwest coast of Italy near San Felice Circeo. At the northern end of the Gulf of Gaeta, it is about 5 kilometres (3.1 mi) long by 1.5 kilometres (0.93 mi) wide at the base, running from east to west and surrounded by the sea on all sides except the north. The land to the northeast is the former ancient Pontine Marshes. Most of the ancient swamp has been reclaimed for agriculture and urban areas.

Mount Circeo, as seen from Terracina in a painting by Giovanni Costa (1896)

The mountain, the coastal zone as far north as Latina, including the only remaining remnant of the swamp, and two of the Pontine Islands offshore, Zannone and Ponza, have been included in the Circeo National Park.

== Geology ==
Although a headland, it was not formed by coastal erosion – as headlands are usually formed – but is a remnant of the orogenic processes that created the Apennines. The entire coast of Lazio, on which the mountain and the marsh are located, was a chain of barrier islands that was formed on a horst and made part of the mainland by sedimentation of the intervening graben.

The mountain is composed mostly of marl and sandstone from the Paleogene and of limestone from the lower Early Jurassic.

The mountain features several caves, including the Goats Cave and the Guattari Cave.

== Prehistory ==
In 1939, the skull of a Neanderthal man was found in the Guattari Cave by a team led by Alberto Carlo Blanc. Several other findings also show that the mountain was inhabited in prehistorical times. In May 2021, the remains of 9 Neanderthal men were discovered in the same Guattari cave. The Minister of Culture in Italy declared the site to be one of the most significant in the world regarding the Neanderthal period.

== Today ==
Mount Circeo is today included in the Circeo National Park, established in 1934 on 5,616 ha (56.16 km^{2}; 13,880 acres; 21.68 sq mi) over the territories of Latina, Sabaudia, San Felice Circeo and Zannone Island (minor island of Ponziane Archipelago).
