= Gulf of Gaeta =

Body of water on the west coast of Italy

Coordinates: 41°06′N 13°30′E

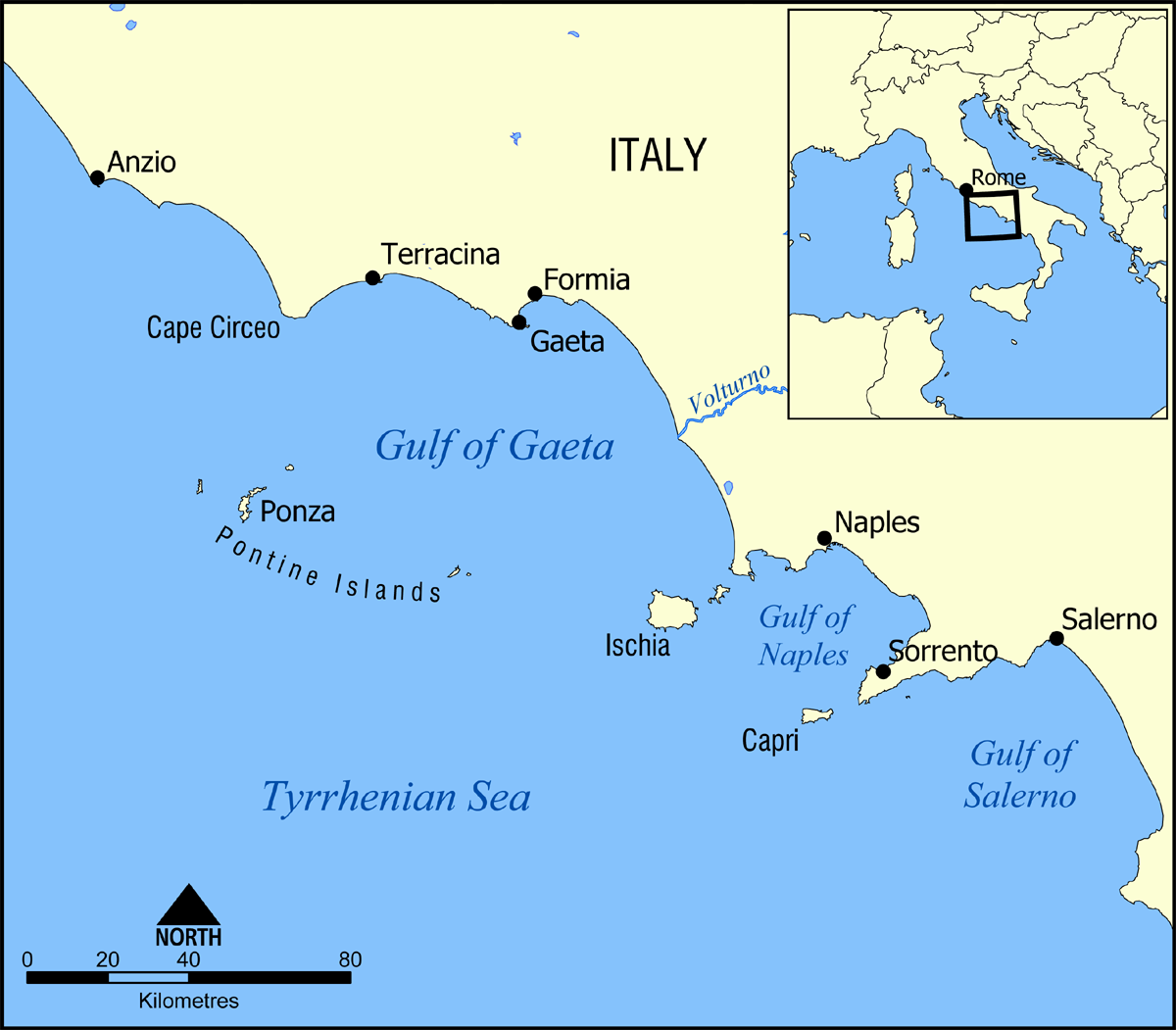
Map showing the location of the Gulf of Gaeta.

The Gulf of Gaeta is a body of water on the west coast of Italy and part of the Tyrrhenian Sea. It is bounded by Cape Circeo in the north, Ischia and the Gulf of Naples in the south, and the Pontine Islands in the west.

The gulf is named for the nearby Italian city of Gaeta. The Volturno is the primary river draining into the gulf.
