= Giovanni Costa =

Giovanni Costa may refer to:

- Giovanni Costa (painter, born 1826) (1826–1903), Italian painter, also called Nino Costa
- Giovanni Battista Costa (painter, born 1833) (1833–1893), Italian painter, also called Giovanni Costa
- Giovanni Costa (footballer) (1901–1968), Italian footballer

== See also ==
- Giovanni Battista Costa (disambiguation)
