= Giovanni Battista Costa (painter, fl. c. 1670) =

Italian painter, active in Milan c. 1670

Giovanni Battista Costa (fl. c. 1670) was an Italian painter, active in Milan about 1670.

The churches of San Agostino, San Giovanni and San Eustorgio in Milan each have a painting by him.

== Sources ==
- Martin, Andrew John (2021). "Costa, Giovanni Battista (1670)". In Beyer, Andreas; Savoy, Bénédicte; Tegethoff, Wolf (eds.). Allgemeines Künstlerlexikon - Internationale Künstlerdatenbank - Online. K. G. Saur. Retrieved 7 October 2022.
- "Costa, Giovanni Battista". Benezit Dictionary of Artists. 2011. Oxford Art Online. Retrieved 7 October 2022.
