= Alberto Carlo Blanc =

Italian paleontologist (1906–1960)

Alberto Carlo Blanc (30 July 1906 – 3 July 1960, Rome) was an Italian paleontologist who studied human evolution. He was a professor at the University of Pisa, Rome and is best known for the discovery of the Circeo neanderthal skull in February 1939.

Blanc was born in Chambéry (Savoy) to Gian Alberto, professor of geochemistry and Maria Menotti. His father Gian Alberto Blanc had also been interested in paleontology and had explored the Romanelli Cave in Salento. Gian Alberto Blanc was a fascist supporter and in 1912 had worked with the anthropologist Aldobrandino Mochi to found a group that worked on human paleontology which became the Italian Institute of Human Paleontology (Istituto Italiano Di Paleontologia Umana) in 1927. Alberto Carlo Blanc graduated in geology from the University of Pisa in 1934, trained under Giuseppe Stefanini following which he spent three years as a researcher at the Pisa Institute before a stint at Sorbonne in 1936-37.

On 25 February 1939, Blanc and Abbé Breuil discovered the Circeo skull in the Guattari Cave on Mount Circeo. He interpreted the damage on it as evidence of ritual cannibalism (although a 1991 study suggests that the skull damage is not unlike that caused by hyenas) in neanderthals belonging to the Mousterian and Aurignacian cultures. Blanc became a lecturer in paleo-ethnology in 1940 and taught ethnology and human paleontology at the University of Pisa, Rome.

Blanc applied Rosa's rule to cultural evolution and came up with what he called the theory of ethnolysis (later as cosmolysis ), the loss of certain characters, which he tried to explain using an incomplete understanding of genetics, did not find much following. The association, along with his father, with the fascist movement led to his being largely isolated within Italian science. In 1954 he founded the journal Quaternaria.
