= Giovanni Battista Costa (painter, born 1833) =

Italian painter, active in Florence (1833–1893)

Giovanni Battista Costa (12 May 1833 – 6 December 1893), also called Giovanni Costa, was an Italian genre painter.

== Life ==
Giovanni Battista Costa was born in Livorno on 12 May 1833. He was a student at the Accademia di Belle Arti di Firenze and worked afterwards in Florence, where he died on 6 December 1893. He painted genre scenes and historical costume pictures, especially scenes from ancient Rome and the Orient.

== Gallery ==
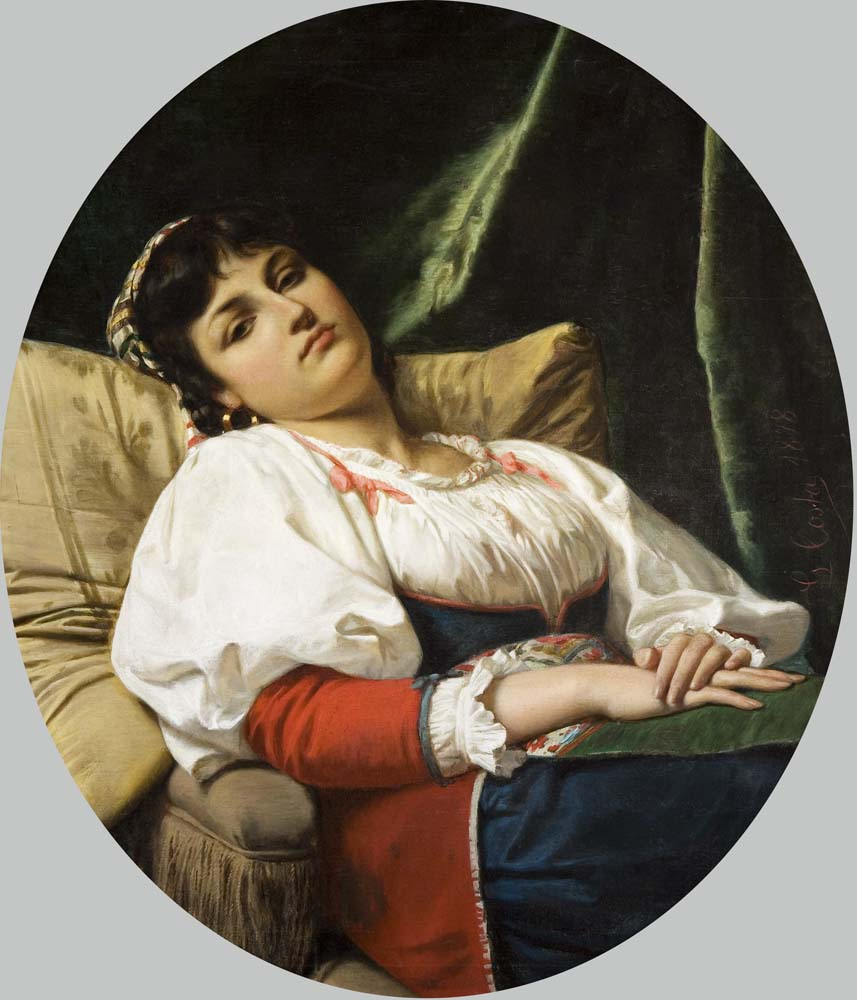
Junges Mädchen im Sessel, 1878

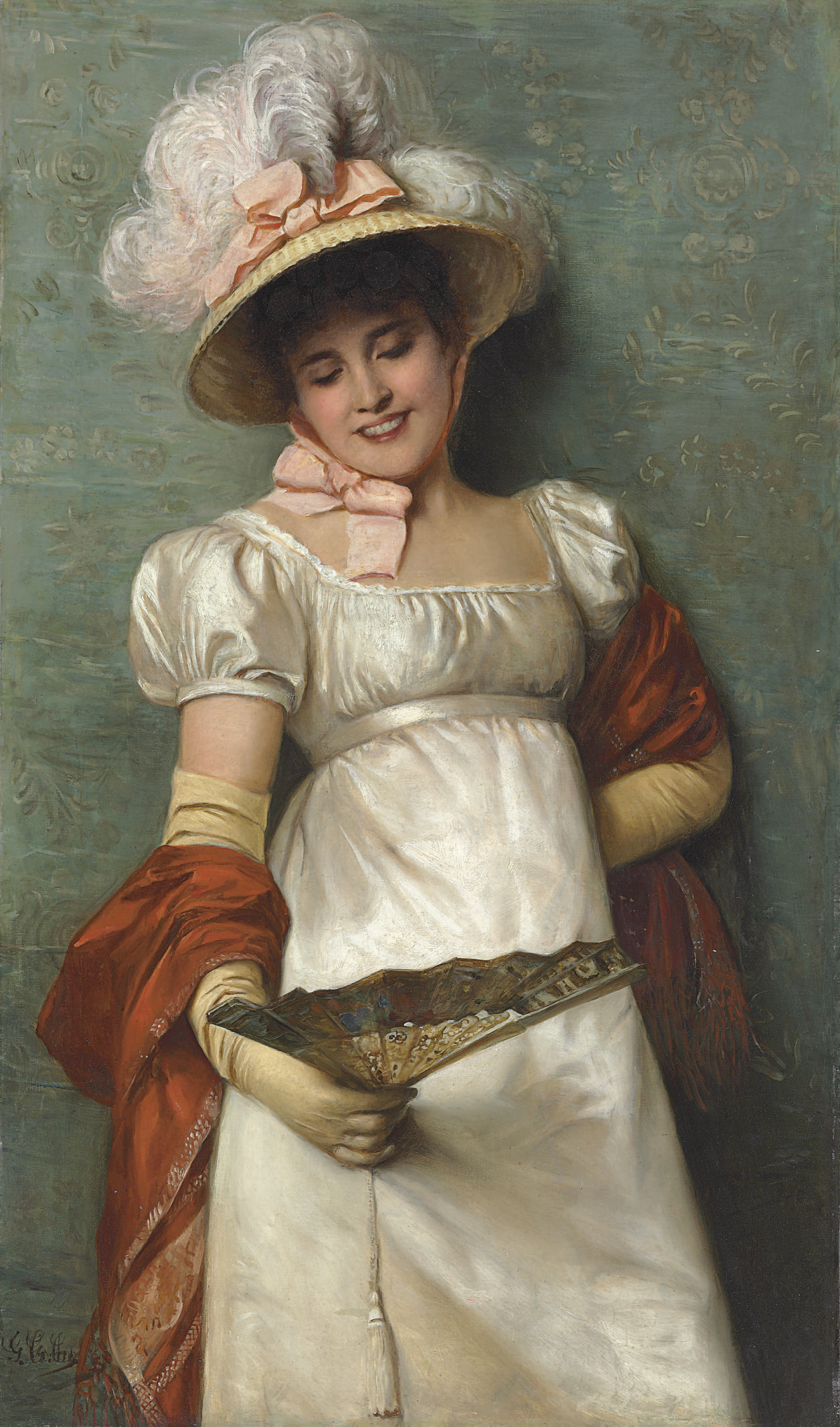
A Fair Maiden

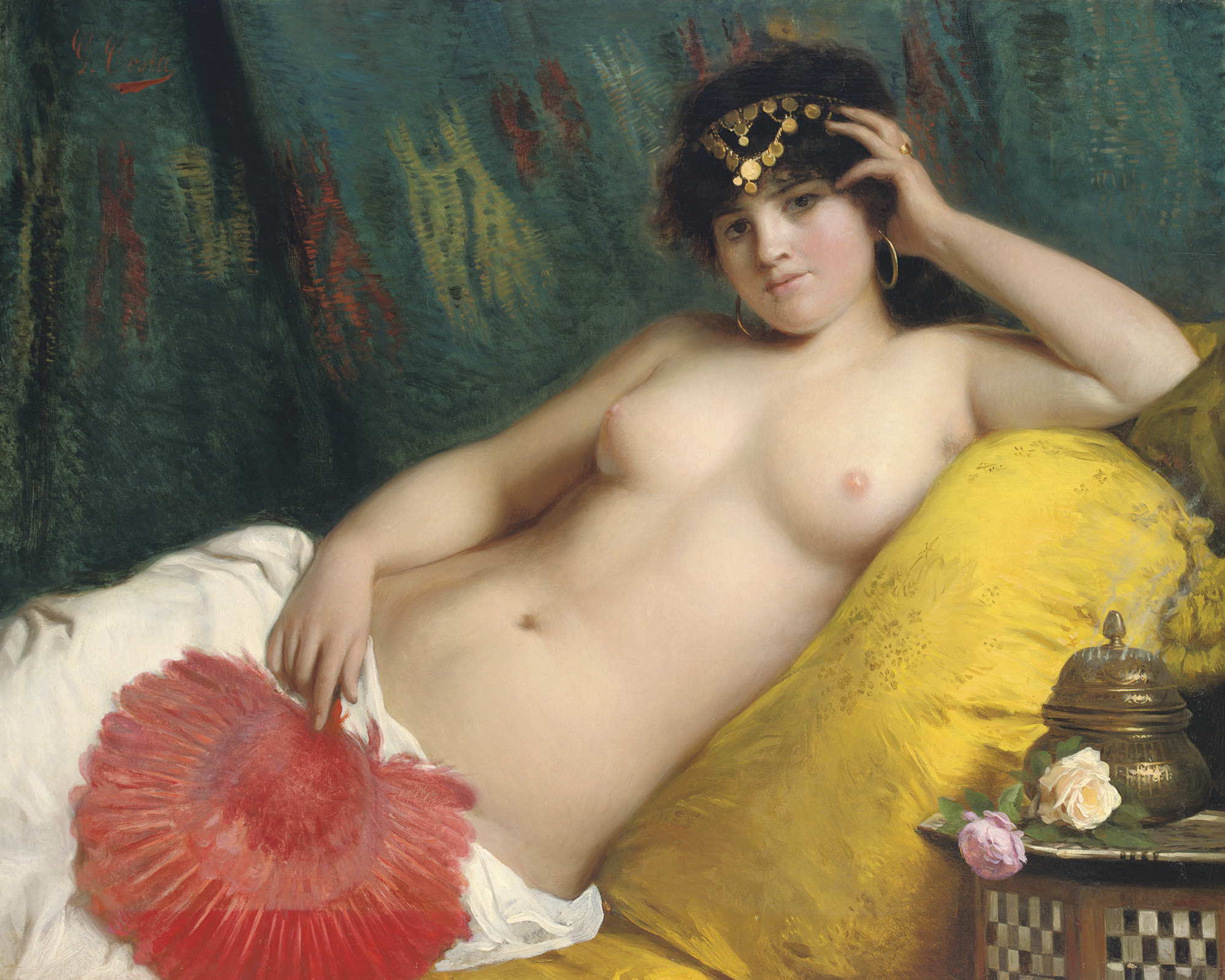
An Odalisque with a Red Fan

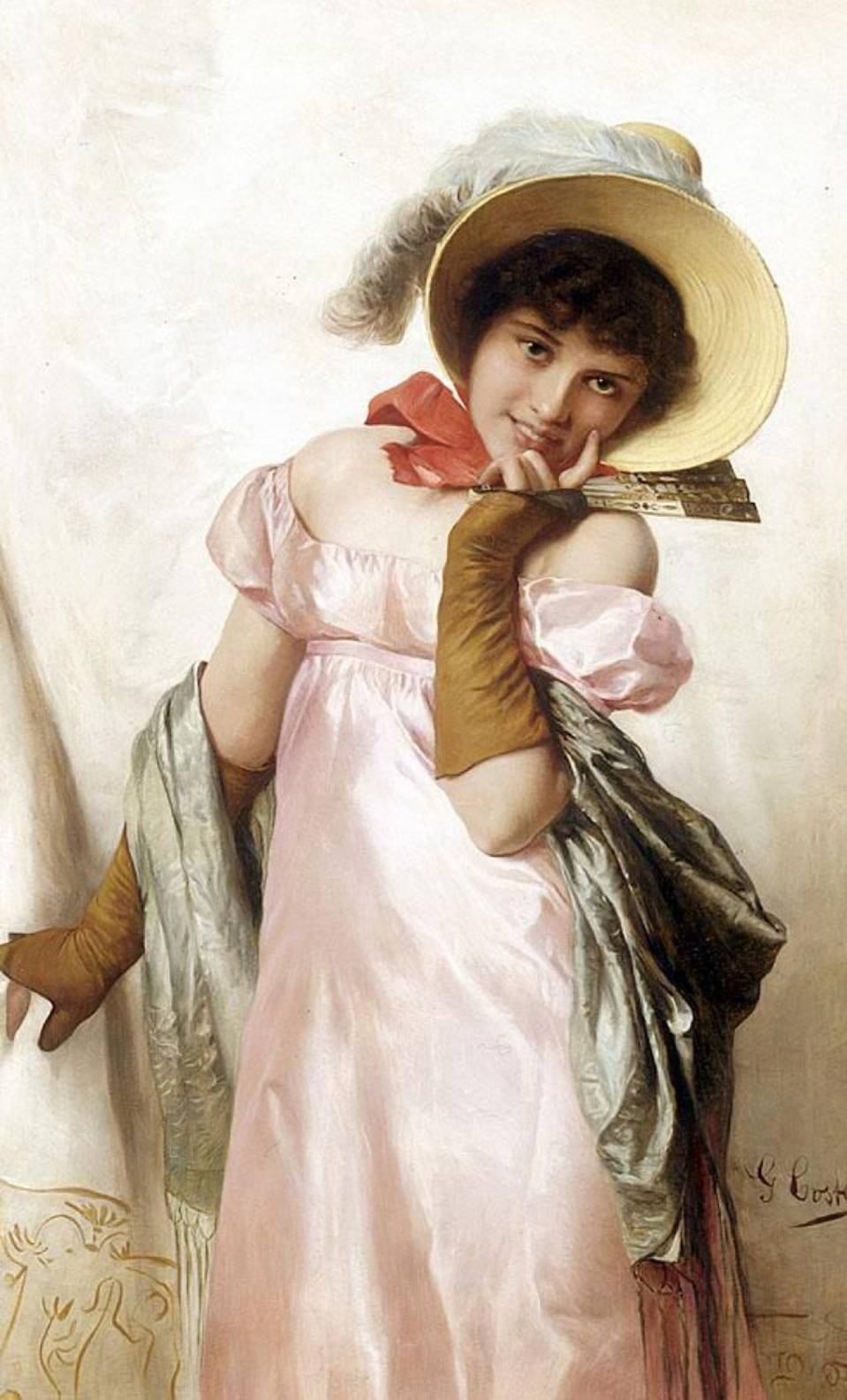
Lady in a Pink Dress

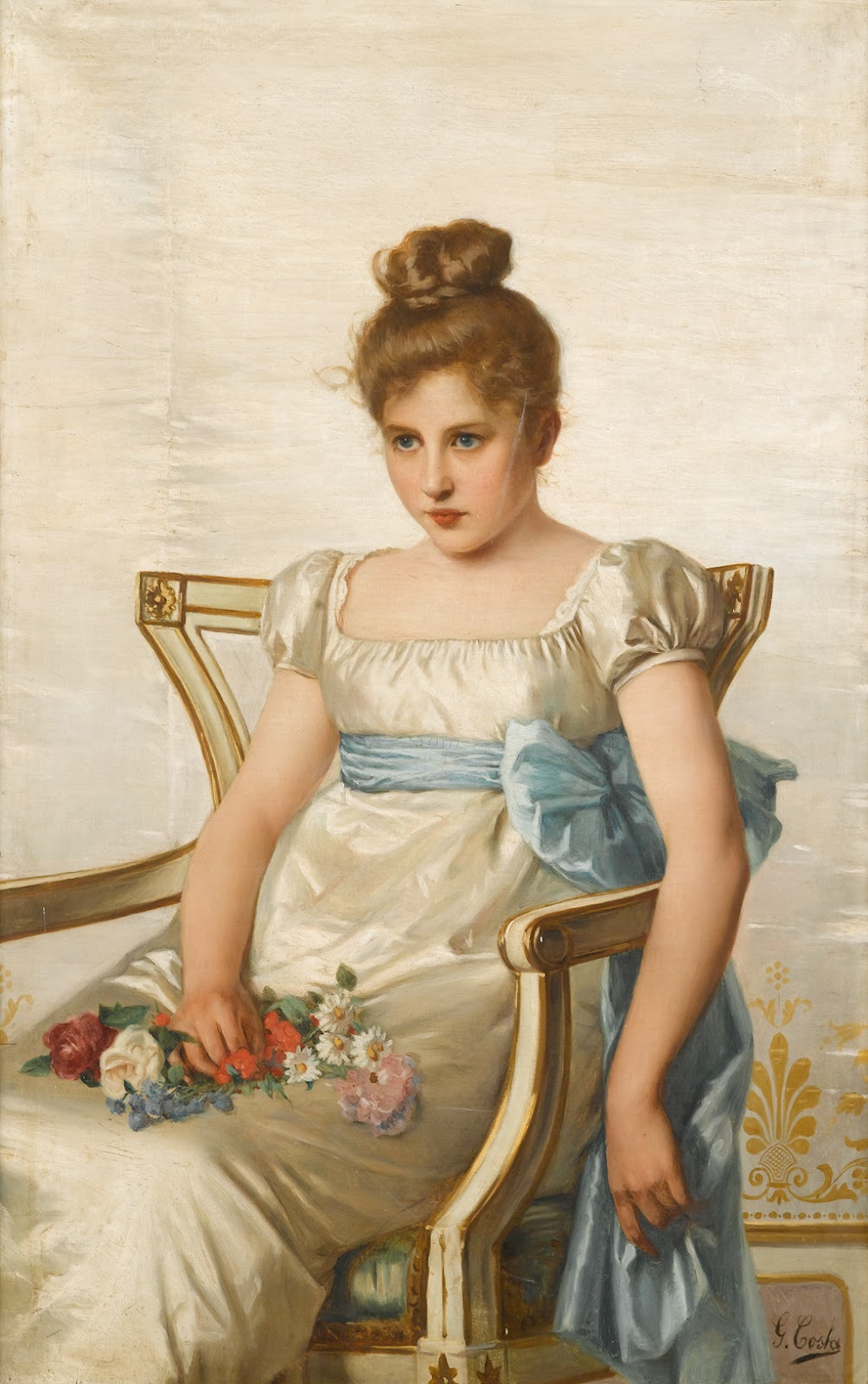
Reverie

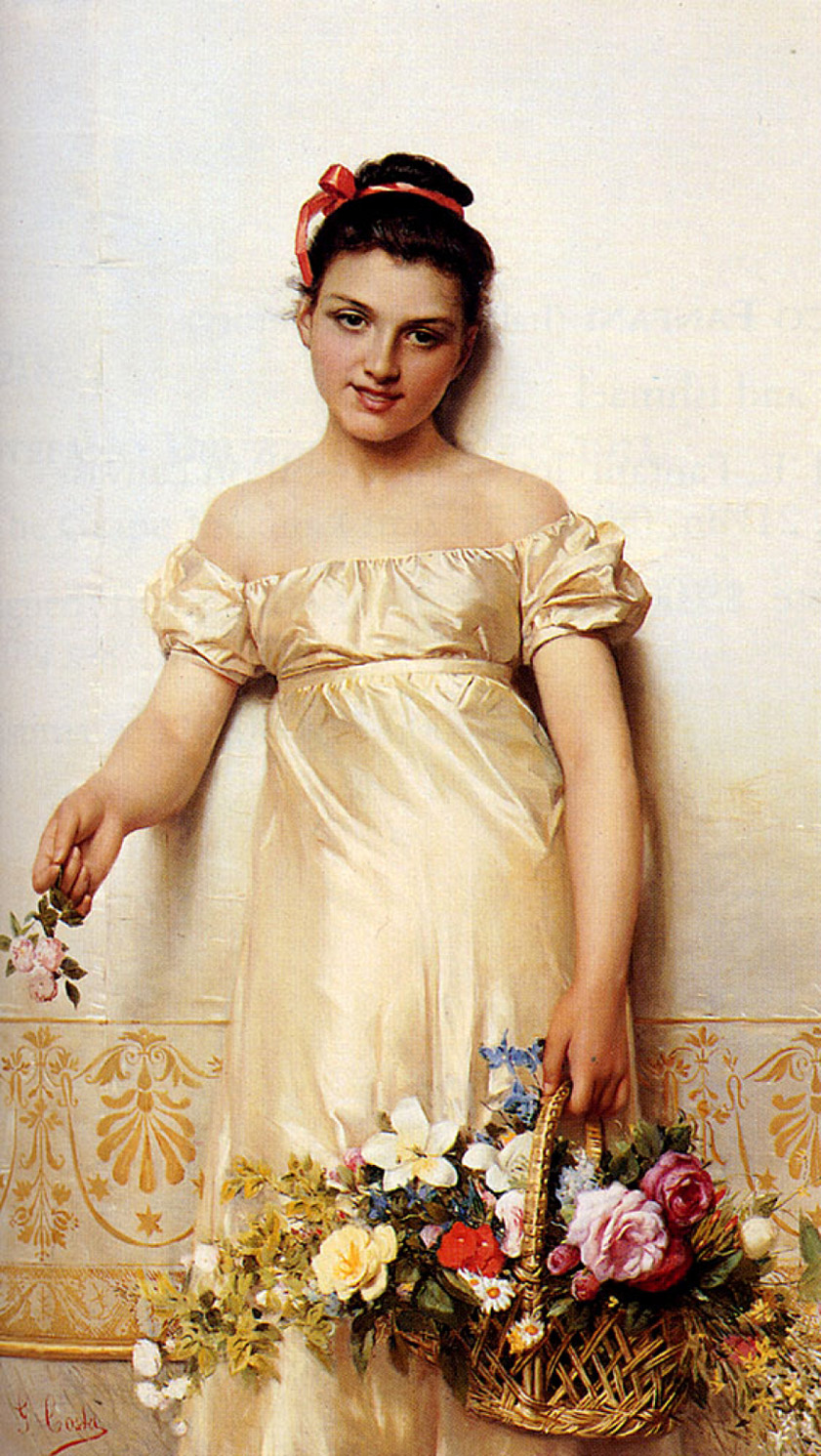
A Young Lady holding a Basket of Flowers

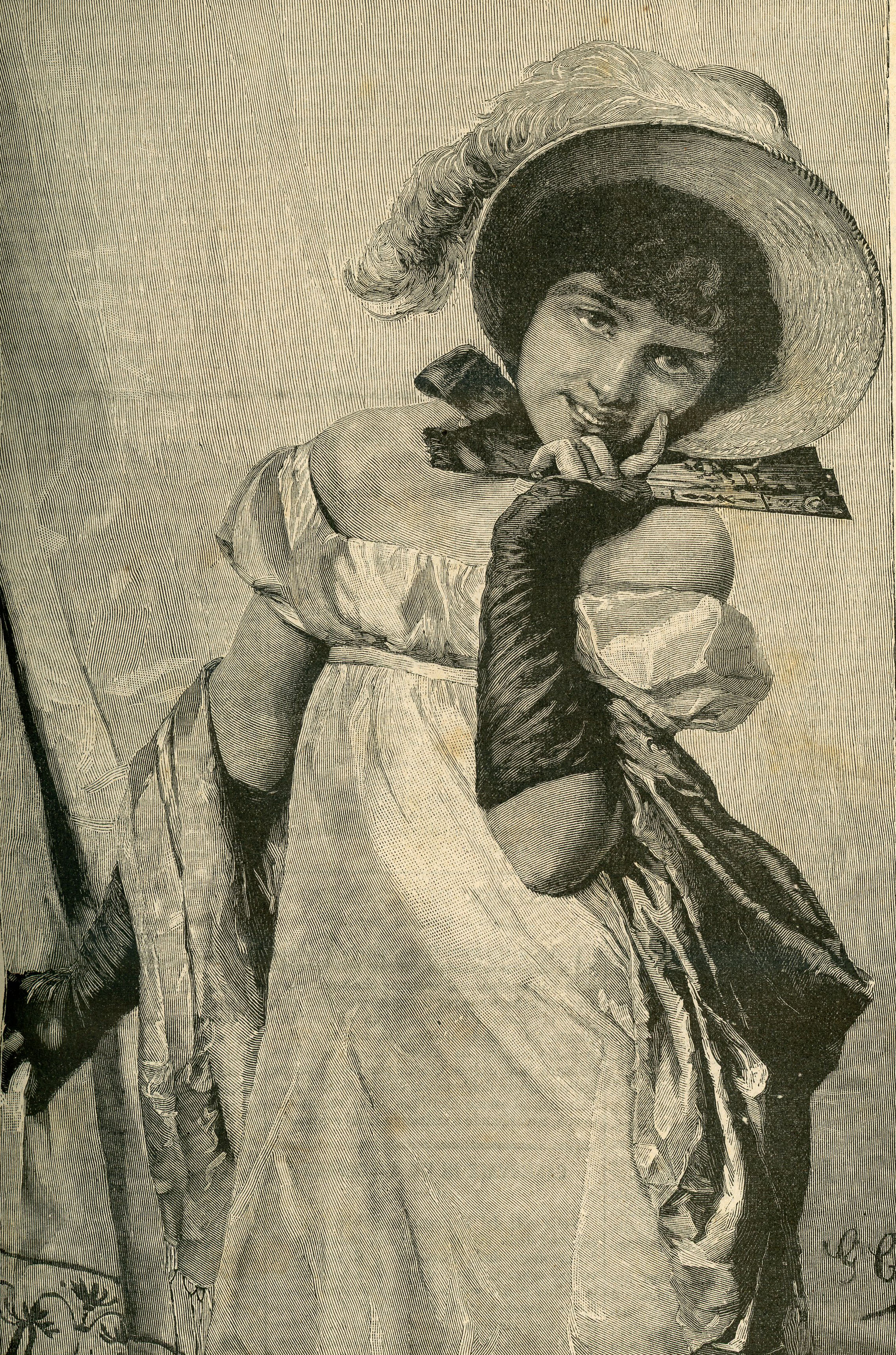
Costume dell'impero (woodcut)

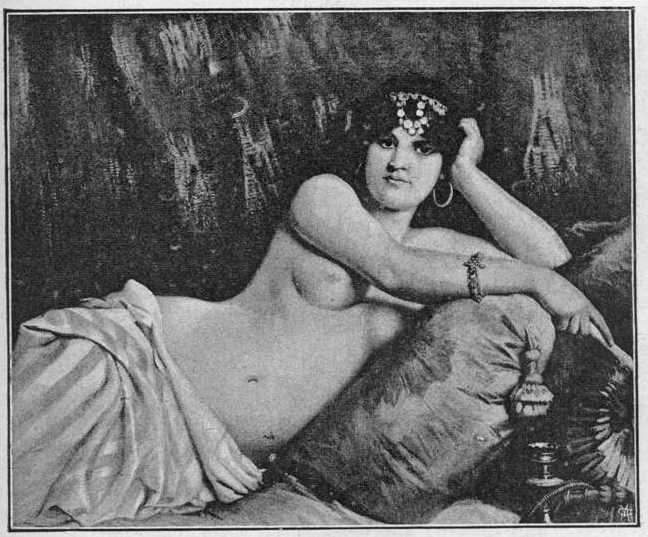
Odaliske

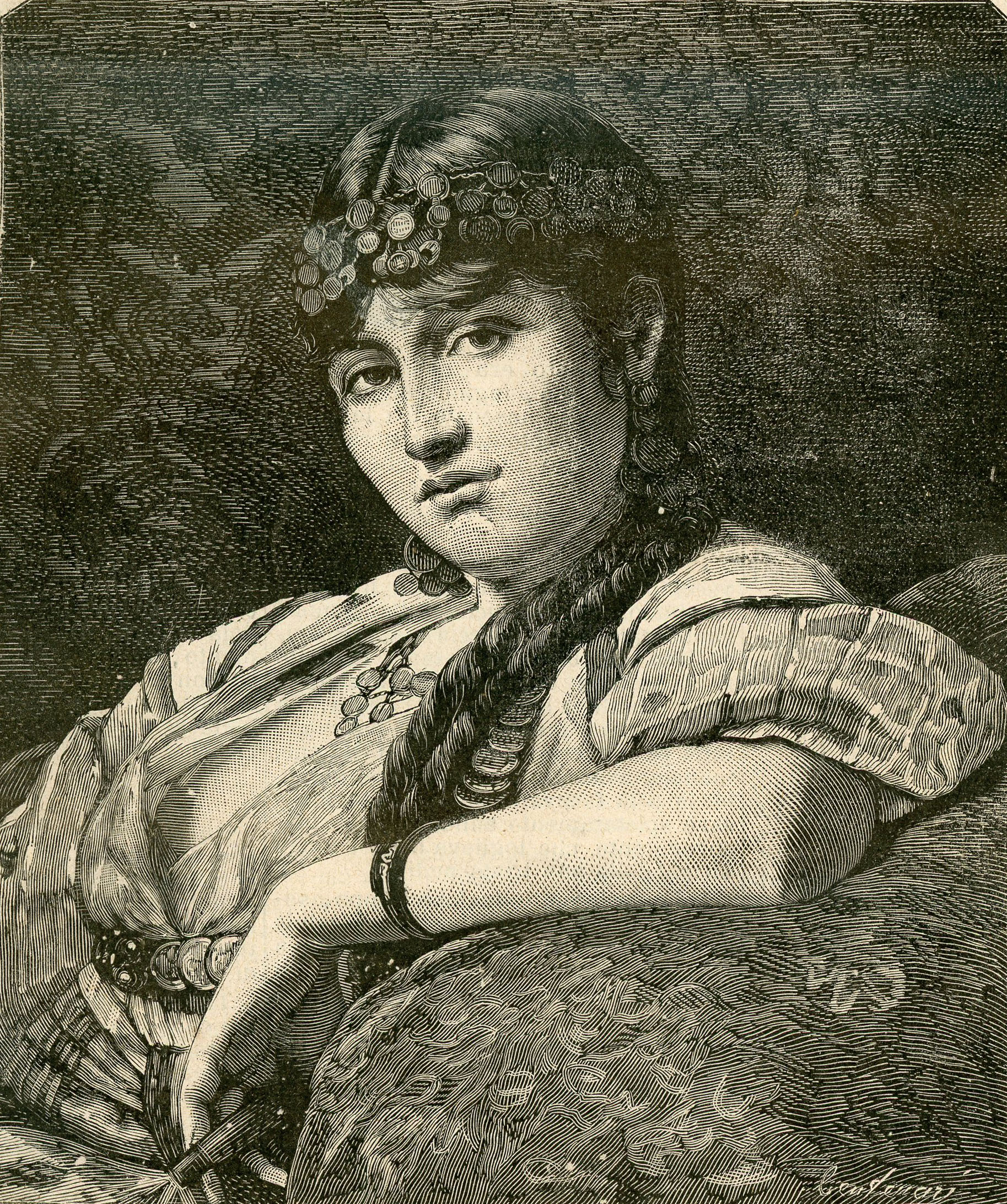
Odalisca, 1884 (woodcut)

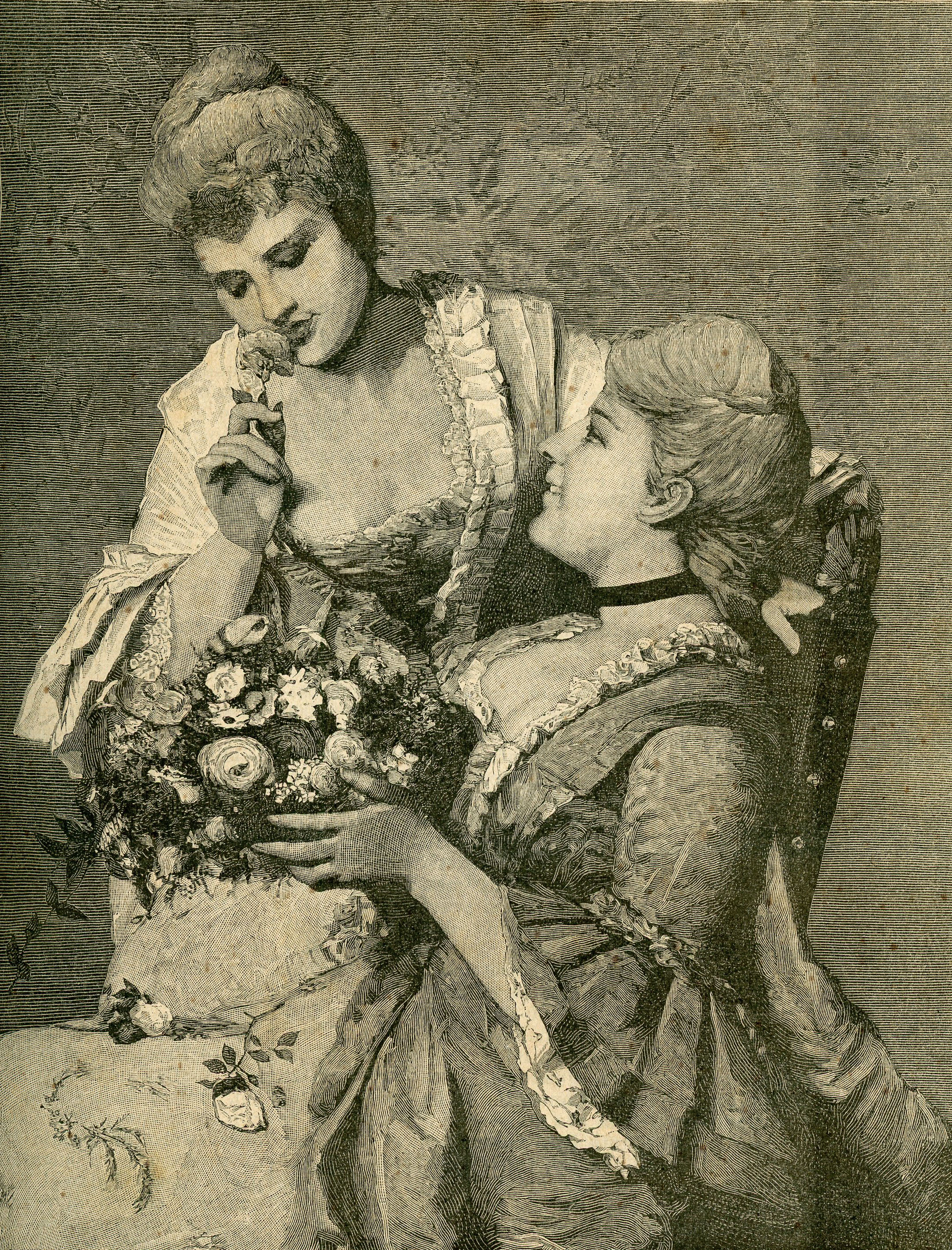
Profumi e fiori, 1889

== Sources ==
- Bénézit, Emmanuel (1924). «Costa (Giovanni)». In Dictionnaire critique et documentaire des peintres, sculpteurs, dessinateurs & graveurs de tous les temps et de tous les pays. Vol. 1. Paris: Ernest Gründ. p. 1019.
- Chiusa, Maria Cristina (2003). "Costa family". Grove Art Online. Oxford Art Online. Retrieved 7 October 2022.
- Stolzenburg, Andreas (2021). "Costa, Giovanni Battista (1833)". In Beyer, Andreas; Savoy, Bénédicte; Tegethoff, Wolf (eds.). Allgemeines Künstlerlexikon - Internationale Künstlerdatenbank - Online. K. G. Saur. Retrieved 7 October 2022.
- "Costa, Giovanni". Benezit Dictionary of Artists. 2011. Oxford Art Online. Retrieved 7 October 2022.
