= List of municipalities of the province of Frosinone =

The following is a list of the 91 municipalities (comuni) of the province of Frosinone in the region of Lazio in Italy.

== List ==
Municipality	Population (2026)	Area (km^{2})	Density
Acquafondata	253	25.32	10.0
Acuto	1,779	13.47	132.1
Alatri	27,436	96.96	283.0
Alvito	2,434	51.72	47.1
Amaseno	4,029	77.73	51.8
Anagni	20,630	112.82	182.9
Aquino	4,898	19.24	254.6
Arce	5,376	39.52	136.0
Arnara	2,136	12.29	173.8
Arpino	6,512	56.24	115.8
Atina	4,079	29.89	136.5
Ausonia	2,405	19.64	122.5
Belmonte Castello	657	14.05	46.8
Boville Ernica	8,214	28.19	291.4
Broccostella	2,609	11.79	221.3
Campoli Appennino	1,596	32.43	49.2
Casalattico	515	28.38	18.1
Casalvieri	2,385	27.27	87.5
Cassino	34,760	83.42	416.7
Castelliri	3,089	15.32	201.6
Castelnuovo Parano	827	9.88	83.7
Castro dei Volsci	4,337	58.45	74.2
Castrocielo	3,727	27.92	133.5
Ceccano	21,962	61.06	359.7
Ceprano	7,940	38.03	208.8
Cervaro	7,708	39.41	195.6
Colfelice	1,747	14.52	120.3
Colle San Magno	603	44.99	13.4
Collepardo	855	24.68	34.6
Coreno Ausonio	1,464	26.38	55.5
Esperia	3,545	108.57	32.7
Falvaterra	503	12.73	39.5
Ferentino	19,902	81.00	245.7
Filettino	533	78.08	6.8
Fiuggi	10,180	32.98	308.7
Fontana Liri	2,589	16.11	160.7
Fontechiari	1,191	16.15	73.7
Frosinone	42,836	46.85	914.3
Fumone	1,929	14.84	130.0
Gallinaro	1,164	17.74	65.6
Giuliano di Roma	2,310	33.54	68.9
Guarcino	1,488	40.37	36.9
Isola del Liri	10,517	16.01	656.9
Monte San Giovanni Campano	11,794	48.71	242.1
Morolo	3,114	26.57	117.2
Paliano	7,852	70.64	111.2
Pastena	1,248	42.16	29.6
Patrica	3,049	27.31	111.6
Pescosolido	1,372	44.90	30.6
Picinisco	1,106	62.15	17.8
Pico	2,554	32.93	77.6
Piedimonte San Germano	6,326	17.32	365.2
Piglio	4,248	35.38	120.1
Pignataro Interamna	2,374	24.41	97.3
Pofi	3,847	30.68	125.4
Pontecorvo	12,067	88.80	135.9
Posta Fibreno	1,035	9.80	105.6
Ripi	4,991	31.61	157.9
Rocca d'Arce	835	11.58	72.1
Roccasecca	6,671	43.33	154.0
San Biagio Saracinisco	289	31.21	9.3
San Donato Val di Comino	1,852	37.64	49.2
San Giorgio a Liri	2,927	15.71	186.3
San Giovanni Incarico	2,966	24.71	120.0
San Vittore del Lazio	2,339	27.51	85.0
Sant'Ambrogio sul Garigliano	865	17.11	50.6
Sant'Andrea del Garigliano	1,263	21.36	59.1
Sant'Apollinare	1,765	41.10	42.9
Sant'Elia Fiumerapido	5,549	43.89	126.4
Santopadre	1,175	31.61	37.2
Serrone	2,935	15.39	190.7
Settefrati	700	50.68	13.8
Sgurgola	2,380	19.22	123.8
Sora	24,672	72.13	342.0
Strangolagalli	2,253	10.57	213.2
Supino	4,557	35.59	128.0
Terelle	263	31.65	8.3
Torre Cajetani	1,317	11.99	109.8
Torrice	4,648	18.06	257.4
Trevi nel Lazio	1,699	54.32	31.3
Trivigliano	1,594	12.64	126.1
Vallecorsa	2,323	39.28	59.1
Vallemaio	881	18.54	47.5
Vallerotonda	1,365	59.66	22.9
Veroli	19,402	119.65	162.2
Vicalvi	694	8.21	84.5
Vico nel Lazio	2,050	45.85	44.7
Villa Latina	1,129	17.02	66.3
Villa Santa Lucia	2,436	17.77	137.1
Villa Santo Stefano	1,564	20.10	77.8
Viticuso	282	20.86	13.5

== See also ==
- List of municipalities of Italy
