= Lago di Canterno =

Lake in the Province of Frosinone, Italy

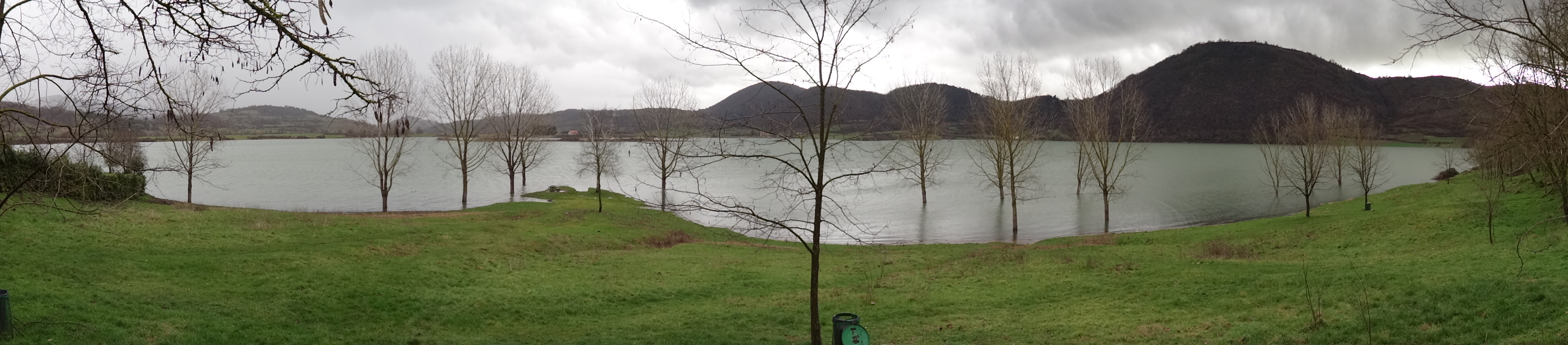
- Lago di Canterno

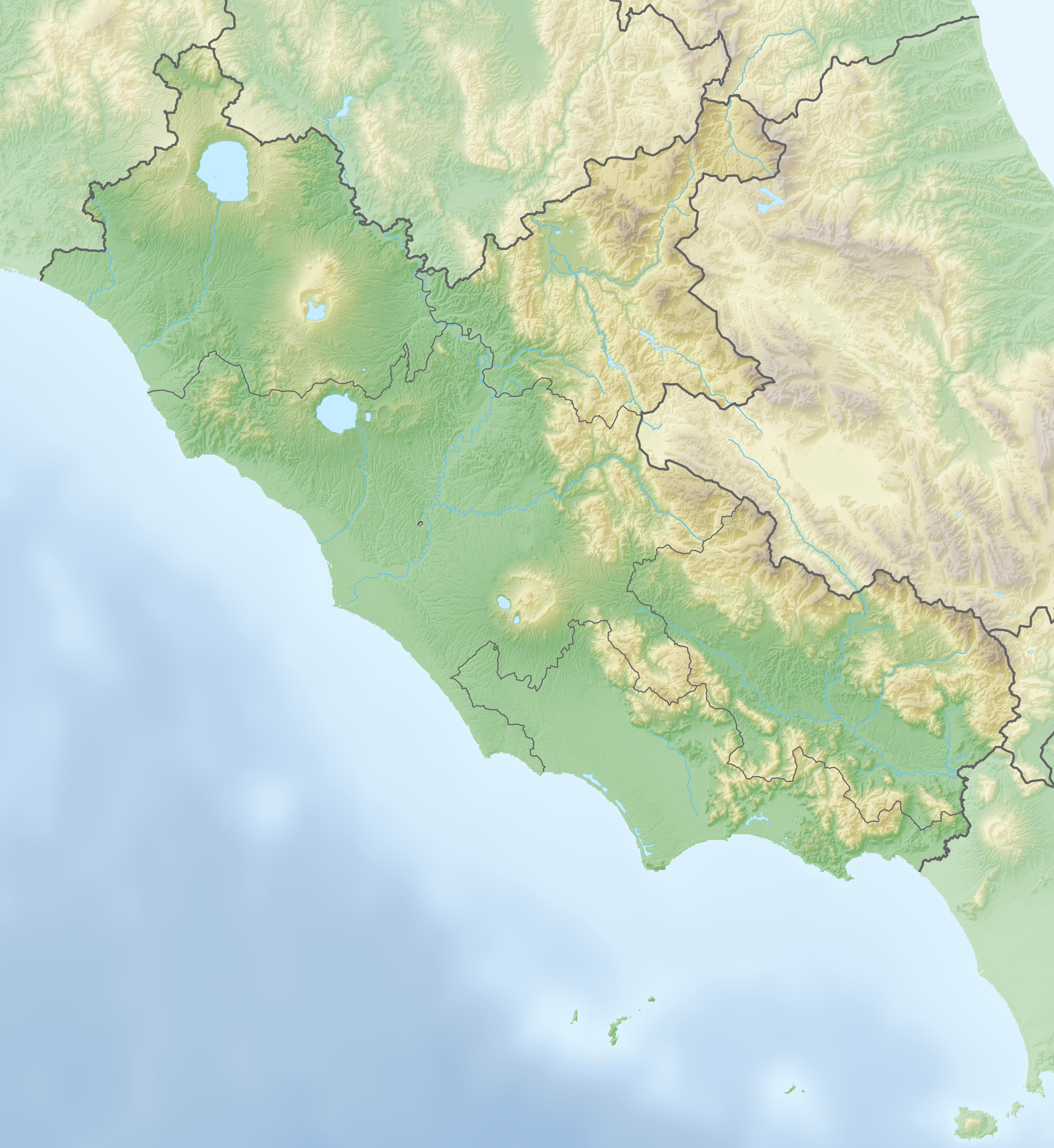
- Location within Lazio
- Location: Province of Frosinone, Lazio
- Coordinates: 41°45′3.6″N 13°15′0″E
- Basin countries: Italy
- Surface area: 0.6 km^{2} (0.23 sq mi)
- Surface elevation: 538 m (1,765 ft)

Lago di Canterno is a Karst lake in the Monti Ernici in the Province of Frosinone, Lazio, Italy.

== Description ==
The lake originally filled when the Pertuso ponor through which the water would normally flow out into the ground would be blocked by debris; the growing water pressure would eventually force the ponor to reopen, emptying the lake. For this reason the lake was often called 'lago fantasma' (phantom lake). Its formation has been traced back to the first years of the eighteen-hundreds when the cultivated fields in the area were flooded. In 1943, following an exploration of Pertuso a connection was found to an underground karst cave where the water would go. This natural cycle was interrupted with the artificial closure of the ponor for the generation of electricity. Due to the instability of the karst geology it is possible to observe small changes in the water level.

The depth of the lake is heavily dependent on the level of precipitation and ranges from 13 to 25 meters.

There is a wide variety of flora and fauna in the area, with some unusual grassy species found due to the unique environmental conditions, such as wikispecies:Persicaria amphibia, Hernania incana, Pulicaria vulgaris, Cyperus michelianus and others, as well as rushes, reeds, and buttercups. There are also willows, poplars, chestnuts and various species of pine.

There are plenty of hedges that serve as protection to wild animals and allow birds to nest and lay eggs.

A range of birds can be found around the lake including various species of heron as well as moorhens, mallards, owls, buzzards. There are also abundant mammals, including foxes, martens, squirrels, porcupines, hares, hedgehogs, boars and numerous other rodents and insectivores.

== Protected Status ==
In 1997 the area was granted protected status as the Riserva naturale del Lago di Canterno, extending for 1824 hectares and is shared between the municipalities of Ferentino, Fiuggi, Fumone, Torre Cajetani and Trivigliano. The reserve is characterized as a wetland and is and is managed by the Azienda Speciale Consortile Riserva Naturale Lago di Canterno.
