= San Giorgio a Liri =

- Comune
- Comune di San Giorgio a Liri
- Location within Italy Location within Lazio
- Coordinates: 41°24′N 13°46′E
- Country: Italy
- Region: Lazio
- Province: Frosinone (FR)
- Frazioni: Torricelli, Cese, Iumari

Government
  - Mayor: Modesto della Rosa

Area
  - Total: 15.71 km^{2} (6.07 sq mi)
- Elevation: 38 m (125 ft)

Population (30 November 2019)
  - Total: 3,112
  - Density: 198.1/km^{2} (513.1/sq mi)
- Demonym: Sangiorgesi
- Time zone: UTC+1 (CET)
  - Summer (DST): UTC+2 (CEST)
- Postal code: 03047
- Dialing code: 0776
- Website: Official website

San Giorgio a Liri is a comune (municipality) in the Province of Frosinone in the Italian region Lazio, located about 120 kilometres (75 mi) southeast of Rome and about 45 kilometres (28 mi) southeast of Frosinone.

== Geography ==
The little town is located in the southernmost part of the province of Frosinone, between the Aurunci mountains and the Liri river. San Giorgio a Liri borders the following municipalities: Castelnuovo Parano, Esperia, Pignataro Interamna, Sant'Apollinare, Vallemaio.
