= Terelle =

- Comune
- Comune di Terelle
- Location within Italy Location within Lazio
- Coordinates: 41°33′N 13°47′E
- Country: Italy
- Region: Lazio
- Province: Frosinone (FR)

Government
  - Mayor: Fiorella Gazzellone

Area
  - Total: 31.65 km^{2} (12.22 sq mi)
- Elevation: 905 m (2,969 ft)

Population (31 October 2018)
  - Total: 360
  - Density: 11/km^{2} (29/sq mi)
- Demonym: Terellesi
- Time zone: UTC+1 (CET)
  - Summer (DST): UTC+2 (CEST)
- Postal code: 03020
- Dialing code: 0776
- Patron saint: Sant'Egidio
- Saint day: September 1
- Website: Official website

Terelle is a comune (municipality) in the Province of Frosinone in the Italian region Lazio, located about 110 kilometres (68 mi) southeast of Rome and about 35 kilometres (22 mi) east of Frosinone.

Terelle borders the following municipalities: Atina, Belmonte Castello, Casalattico, Cassino, Colle San Magno, Piedimonte San Germano, Sant'Elia Fiumerapido, Villa Santa Lucia.

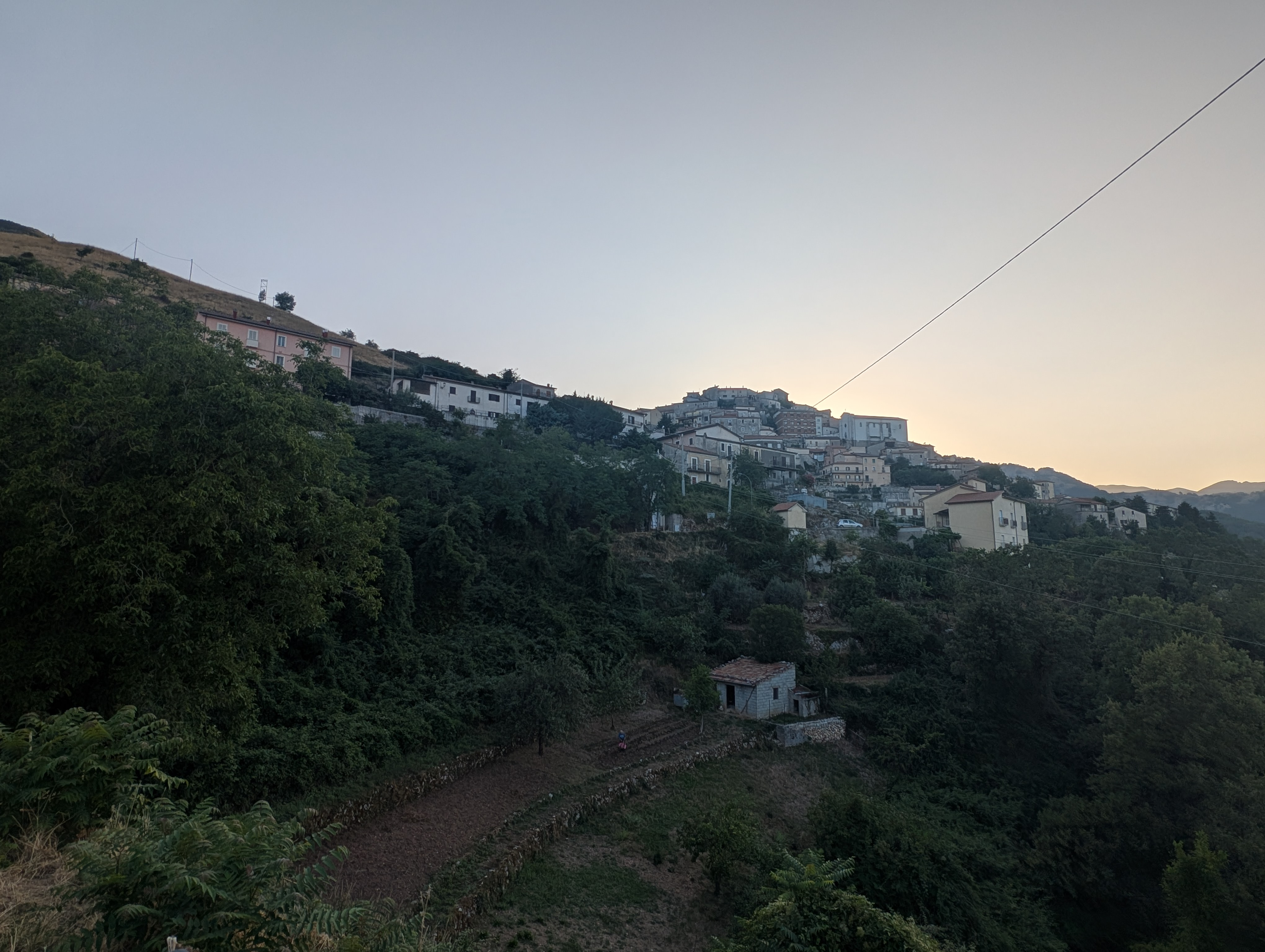
