= Villa Santa Lucia =

- Comune
- Comune di Villa Santa Lucia
- Location within Italy Location within Lazio
- Coordinates: 41°31′N 13°47′E
- Country: Italy
- Region: Lazio
- Province: Frosinone (FR)
- Frazioni: Piumarola, Pittoni

Government
  - Mayor: Antonio Iannarelli

Area
  - Total: 18.1 km^{2} (7.0 sq mi)
- Elevation: 323 m (1,060 ft)

Population (30 November 2021)
  - Total: 2,606
  - Density: 144/km^{2} (373/sq mi)
- Demonym: Villesi
- Time zone: UTC+1 (CET)
  - Summer (DST): UTC+2 (CEST)
- Postal code: 03030
- Dialing code: 0776
- Website: Official website

Villa Santa Lucia is a comune (municipality) in the province of Frosinone in the Italian region Lazio, located about 110 kilometres (68 mi) southeast of Rome and about 35 kilometres (22 mi) southeast of Frosinone.

Villa Santa Lucia borders the following municipalities: Cassino, Piedimonte San Germano, Pignataro Interamna, Terelle.
