= Belmonte Castello =

- Comune
- Comune di Belmonte Castello
- Location within Italy Location within Lazio
- Coordinates: 41°35′N 13°49′E
- Country: Italy
- Region: Lazio
- Province: Frosinone (FR)

Government
  - Mayor: Antonio Iannetta

Area
  - Total: 14.05 km^{2} (5.42 sq mi)
- Elevation: 369 m (1,211 ft)

Population (28 February 2017)
  - Total: 725
  - Density: 51.6/km^{2} (134/sq mi)
- Demonym: Belmontesi
- Time zone: UTC+1 (CET)
  - Summer (DST): UTC+2 (CEST)
- Postal code: 03040
- Dialing code: 0776
- Patron saint: St. Nicholas
- Saint day: 6 December

Belmonte Castello is a comune (municipality) in the Province of Frosinone in the Italian region Lazio, located about 120 kilometres (75 mi) southeast of Rome and about 40 kilometres (25 mi) east of Frosinone.

Belmonte Castello borders the following municipalities: Atina, Sant'Elia Fiumerapido, Terelle, Villa Latina.
