= Rome–Fiuggi–Alatri–Frosinone railway =

Railway line in Italy

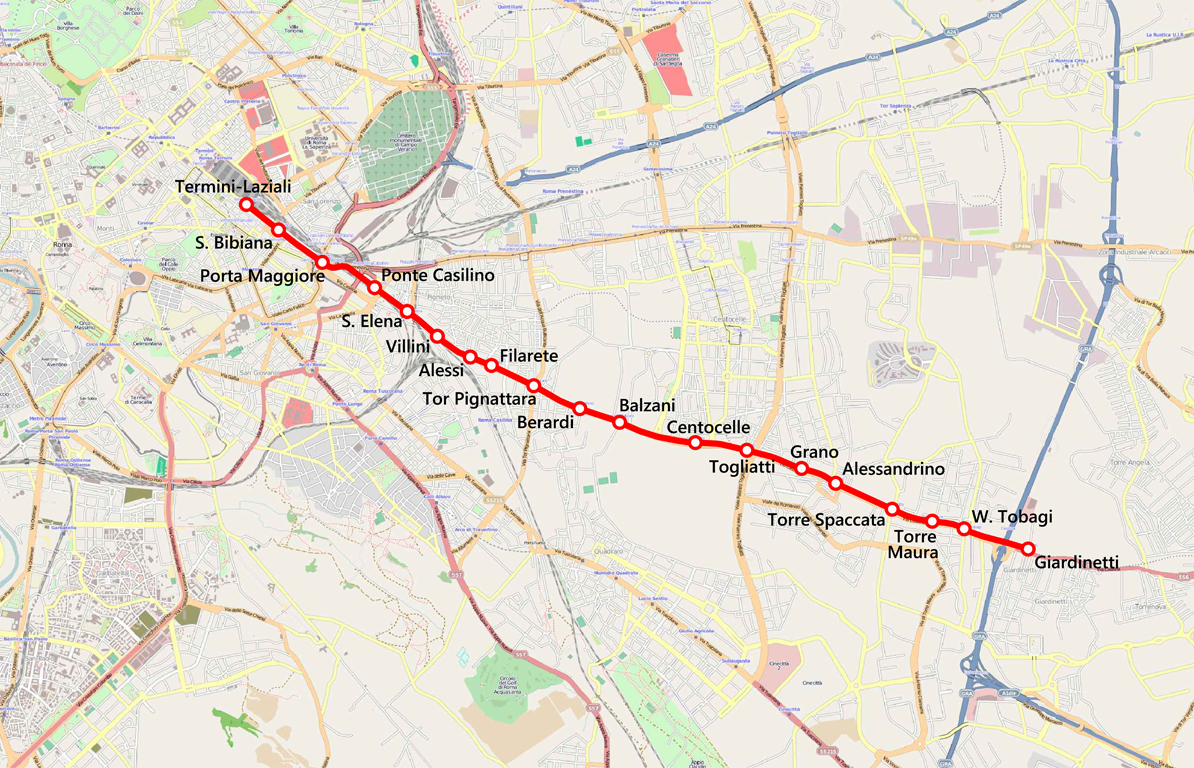
Map

The Rome–Fiuggi railway (Italian: Ferrovia Roma–Fiuggi–Alatri–Frosinone) is a former railway built on the east part of Rome, Italy. It consisted of a 78.1 kilometers (48.5 mi) long narrow gauge 950 mm (3 ft 1 3/8 in) line from Rome to Fiuggi.

== History ==
In March 1907, the Superior Council of Public Works gave its permission to build the line, which had been designed by Antonio Clementi.

Works were started in 1913 by the "Società per le Ferrovie Vicinali" (SFV), and the first section of the railway was opened for service on 12 June 1916, from Rome to San Cesareo and Genazzano, together with a branch line from San Cesareo to Frascati. The railway used a narrow gauge of 950 mm (3 ft 1 3/8 in), with electric traction and high-voltage direct current (850 V). In Rome, an SFV Station was constructed besides Roma Termini station, on the Esquiline Hill side.

At the start of services, trains were first and third class, with four couples of trains a day. However, services increased over the years. On 6 May 1916 the branch line Genazzano-Fiuggi was opened for service. From Rome to Fiuggi trips lasted two hours and 45 minutes, but service was frequent, with a train departing every half-hour.

The Fiuggi-Alatri-Frosinone and Fiuggi-Vico nel Lazio-Guarcino branch lines were opened for service on 14 July 1917. In 1943–1944 the Roma-Fiuggi railway was partly destroyed by Allied bombing. In 1945 the line was reopened.

In 1982 the branch line Genazzano-Fiuggi was closed, followed in 1983 by the line Pantano-Genazzano.

== The route today ==
Until 2008, 18.4 kilometers (11.4 mi) of the railway was in use as Rome's urban service from Roma Laziali station (which is connected to Roma Termini station) to Pantano. This railway now terminates at Giardinetti, while the Giardinetti Pantano section has been rebuilt for Metro line C.

== Museum ==
There is a museum at Colonna, Lazio.

== Sources ==
- M. Panconesi "Le ferrovie di Pio IX" ed. Calosci-Cortona 2005 - ISBN 88-7785-206-2
