= Strangolagalli =

- Comune
- Comune di Strangolagalli
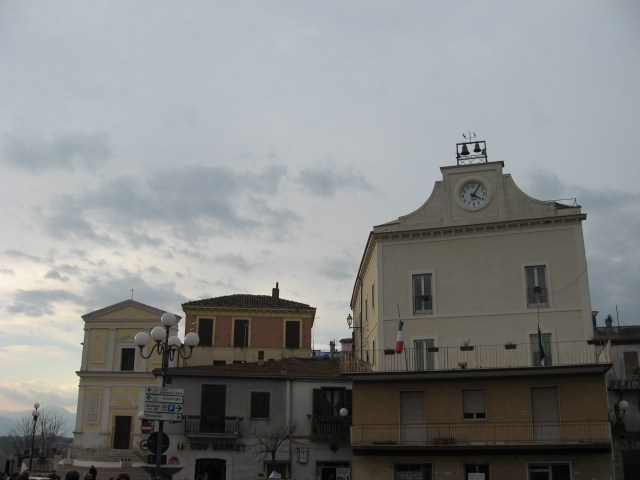
- View of Strangolagalli

- Location within Italy Location within Lazio
- Coordinates: 41°36′N 13°29′E
- Country: Italy
- Region: Lazio
- Province: Frosinone (FR)

Government
  - Mayor: Roberto De Vellis

Area
  - Total: 10.57 km^{2} (4.08 sq mi)
- Elevation: 232 m (761 ft)

Population (2017)
  - Total: 2,450
  - Density: 232/km^{2} (600/sq mi)
- Demonym: Strangolagallesi
- Time zone: UTC+1 (CET)
  - Summer (DST): UTC+2 (CEST)
- Postal code: 03020
- Dialing code: 0775
- Patron saint: St. Michael the Archangel
- Saint day: 29 September
- Website: Official website

Strangolagalli is a comune (municipality) in the province of Frosinone in the Italian region Lazio, located about 90 kilometres (56 mi) southeast of Rome and about 12 kilometres (7 mi) southeast of Frosinone. It is located on the slopes of Ernici Mountains, towards the Liri River. Economy is based mainly on agriculture, numerous inhabitants commuting to nearby industries for work.

== History ==
The origin of the name (in Italian: "Chicken-Strangler") is uncertain. It could derive from Byzantine Greek στρογγύλος (strongúlos, "circular") and Lombardic wal ("palisade", akin to English wall), indicating a settlement fortified in that way. A 17th-century scholar derived it from the villa of one Roman patrician Astragalus Gallus.

Archaeological findings have indeed suggested that Strangolagalli had been a Roman settlement. The existence of the castle is attested in 1097, but it was probably of Lombard origin. Initially a dominion of the Girini (or Girindi) family, it was later under the seignories of Veroli and D'Aquino. The town and countryside are dominated with the Maini, Viselli, Valeri, Tomassi, Lisi, Sementilli, Stirpe, DeVellis and Casagrande family lines.

In the 14th century the area was contended by the Angevines and Aragonese, and in the following century it was acquired by the Papal States. Traditionally a seat of brigandage, it fought against the Napoleonic occupation.

In 1915 it was damaged by an earthquake. During World War II it was further damaged during the German retreat from the Gustav Line.
