= Vallemaio =

- Comune
- Comune di Vallemaio
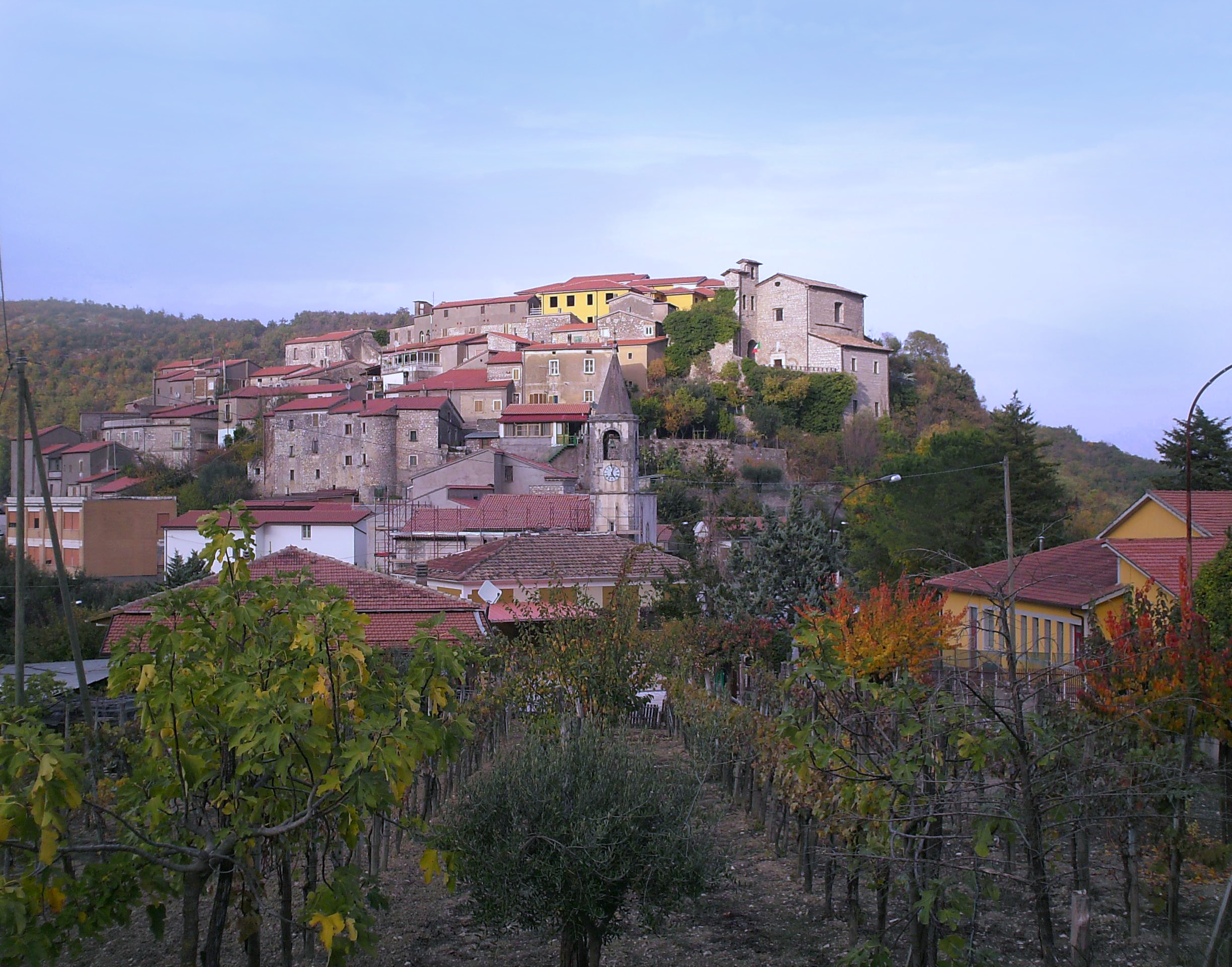
- View of Vallemaio

- Coat of arms

- Location within Italy Location within Lazio
- Coordinates: 41°22′N 13°49′E
- Country: Italy
- Region: Lazio
- Province: Frosinone (FR)

Government
  - Mayor: Fernando Tommaso De Magistris

Area
  - Total: 19.6 km^{2} (7.6 sq mi)
- Elevation: 337 m (1,106 ft)

Population (30/11/2019)
  - Total: 907
  - Density: 46.3/km^{2} (120/sq mi)
- Demonym: Vallemaiesi or Vallefreddani
- Time zone: UTC+1 (CET)
  - Summer (DST): UTC+2 (CEST)
- Postal code: 03040
- Dialing code: 0776
- Patron saint: Thomas The Apostle
- Saint day: 7 July
- Website: Official website

Vallemaio is a comune (municipality) in the Province of Frosinone in the Italian region Lazio, located about 120 kilometres (75 mi) southeast of Rome and about 50 kilometres (31 mi) southeast of Frosinone.

Vallemaio borders the following municipalities: Castelforte, Castelnuovo Parano, Coreno Ausonio, San Giorgio a Liri, Sant'Andrea del Garigliano, Sant'Apollinare.

== Etymology ==
Before 1932, the name of the commune was Vallefredda, a toponym which emphasized the harsh climate that one has in winter. However, considering it lies on the slopes of the Mount Maio, it was renamed in 1932.
