= Torre Cajetani =

- Comune
- Comune di Torre Cajetani
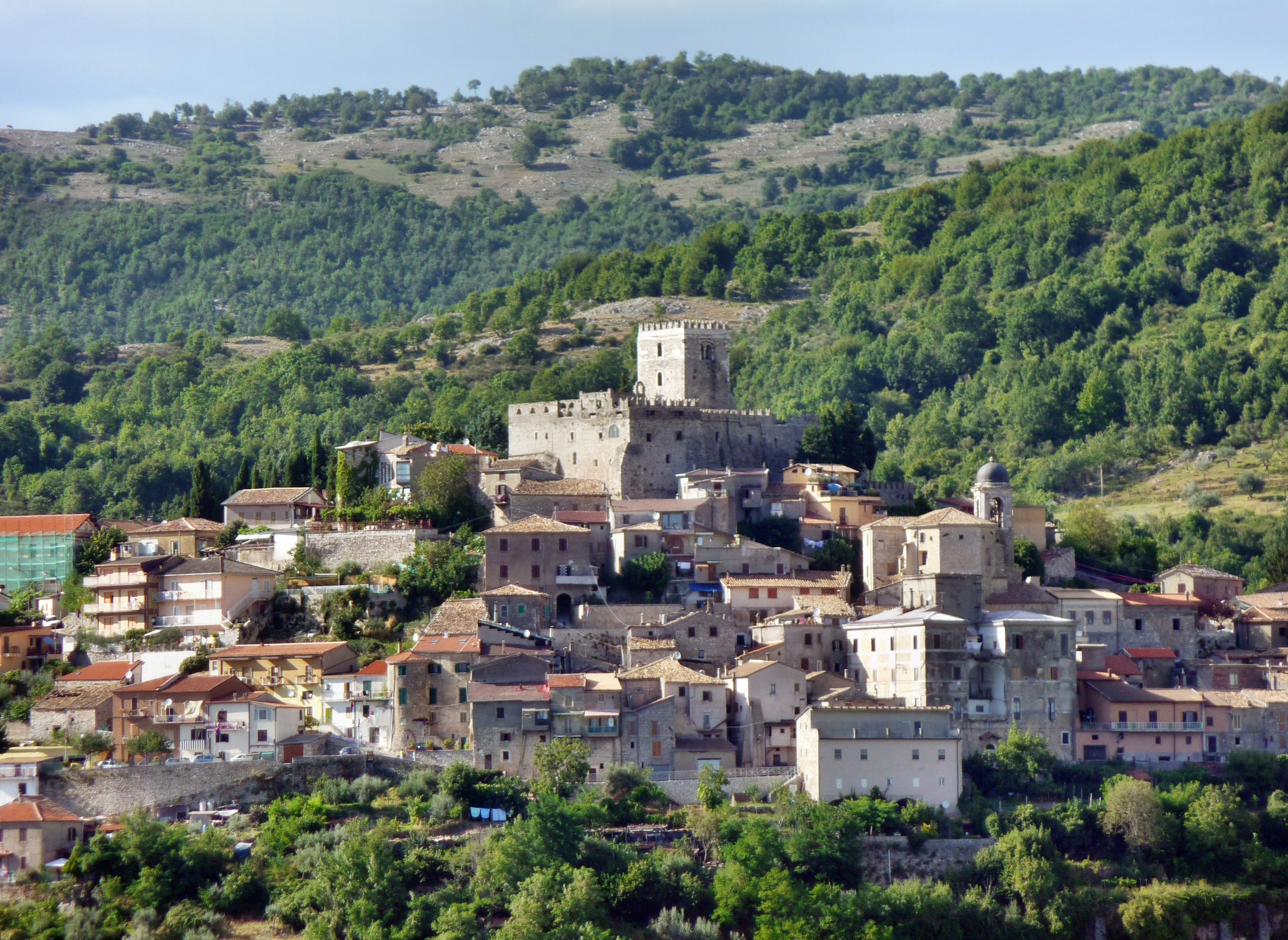
- View of Torre Cajetani

- Location within Italy Location within Lazio
- Coordinates: 41°47′N 13°16′E
- Country: Italy
- Region: Lazio
- Province: Frosinone (FR)

Government
  - Mayor: Silverio Ubodi

Area
  - Total: 11.6 km^{2} (4.5 sq mi)
- Elevation: 817 m (2,680 ft)

Population (31 December 2010)
  - Total: 1,464
  - Density: 126/km^{2} (327/sq mi)
- Demonym: Torrigiani
- Time zone: UTC+1 (CET)
  - Summer (DST): UTC+2 (CEST)
- Postal code: 03010
- Dialing code: 0775
- Patron saint: St. Michael Archangel
- Saint day: May 8
- Website: Official website

Torre Cajetani is a comune (municipality) in the Province of Frosinone in the Italian region Lazio, located about 60 kilometres (37 mi) east of Rome and about 20 kilometres (12 mi) northwest of Frosinone.

Torre Cajetani borders the following municipalities: Fiuggi, Guarcino, Trivigliano.

The name derives from the Caetani family.

Since 2003, the city has maintained a partnership with Brwinow near Warsaw in Poland.

== Main sights ==
- Teofilatto-Caetani castle
- Lago di Canterno and natural preserve
