= Casalattico =

- Comune
- Comune di Casalattico
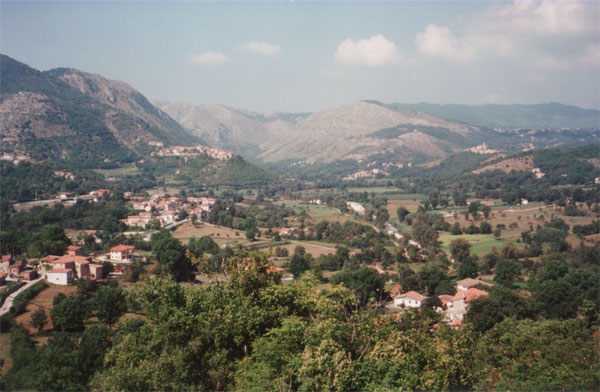
- View of Casalattico

- Position of comune of Casalattico in the province of Frosinone

- Location within Italy Location within Lazio
- Coordinates: 41°37′N 13°44′E
- Country: Italy
- Region: Lazio
- Province: Frosinone (FR)
- Frazioni: Montattico, Monforte, Sant'Andrea, Macchia, Verticchio, San Nazario

Government
  - Mayor: Francesco Antonio Di Lucia

Area
  - Total: 28.38 km^{2} (10.96 sq mi)
- Elevation: 420 m (1,380 ft)

Population (31 August 2020)
  - Total: 534
  - Density: 18.8/km^{2} (48.7/sq mi)
- Demonym: Casalatticesi
- Time zone: UTC+1 (CET)
  - Summer (DST): UTC+2 (CEST)
- Postal code: 03030
- Dialing code: 0776
- Patron saint: Barbatus of Benevento
- Saint day: 19 February
- Website: Official website

Casalattico (Campanian: Casale) is a comune (municipality) in the Province of Frosinone in the Italian region of Lazio. The village is located about 110 kilometres (68 mi) southeast of Rome and about 30 kilometres (19 mi) east of Frosinone.

It is home to a summer Irish festival celebrating the local families that moved to Ireland with the twinning of the town with Naas in County Kildare. The festival hosts Irish folk music and local artists. The nearby Melfa river, a tributary of the Liri, flows in the commune. The town houses the local commune offices and postal services. The commune is bounded by the communes of Atina and Casalvieri on one side and Colle San Magno and Terelle, Arpino, and Santopadre on the other. Casalattico is surrounded by mountains reaching up to 1700 metres.

== History ==
The Roman entrepreneur and banker Titus Pomponius Atticus is believed to have had a villa in what is now the frazione of Montattico.

In 1944, during the World War II, largo San Nazario, of the Casalattico commune was the site of a German forward Emergency Hospital confiscated from the Fusco family owners of the period after the war subsequently reclaimed by the present owners. People from the Monforte and Casalattico area were transported by the occupation German military forces to the Concentration camp at Cesano. At the end of hostilities in 1945 in the nearby valley towns the level of destruction was huge, leading to a large immigration wave.

Casalattico is where the vast majority of Italian-Irish chip shop owners emigrated from – including members of well-known families such as Borza, Cafolla, Fusco, Macari and Mizzoni.

== Main sights ==
The Casalattico area includes the medieval ruins of the ancient Benedictine monastery of Sant'Angelo in Pesco Mascolino (780 AD), and an earlier example of a Roman bridge on the Melfa river. Other Roman remains are found in the archaeological site of San Nazario.

The centre Piazza houses an example of a Norman-style tower dating from 1200 AD. The hilltop town has no moat and is accessible by one winding access road passing the graveyard to the left on approach.
