= Ernici =

Ernici may refer to:

- Hernici, an ancient people of Italy
- Monti Ernici, a mountain range forming part of the Italian Apennines
