= Giardino Botanico di Collepardo =

Botanical garden in Italy

Coordinates: 41°46′N 13°22′E

The Giardino Botanico di Collepardo, also known as the Giardino Botanico "Flora Ernica", is a nature preserve and botanical garden located in Collepardo, Province of Frosinone, Lazio, Italy. It is open several months per year.

The garden was established in 1985 by the World Wide Fund for Nature; it opened to the public in 1991. It currently contains about 400 species indigenous to the Monti Ernici, a chain of central Apennine Mountains. This represents about 50% of the Monti Ernici flora, including some protected species. The garden contains a nature trail through forests, meadows, marshes and small clearings. Some plants are marked with a card providing botanical information.

== See also ==
- List of botanical gardens in Italy
