= Esperia =

- Comune
- Comune di Esperia
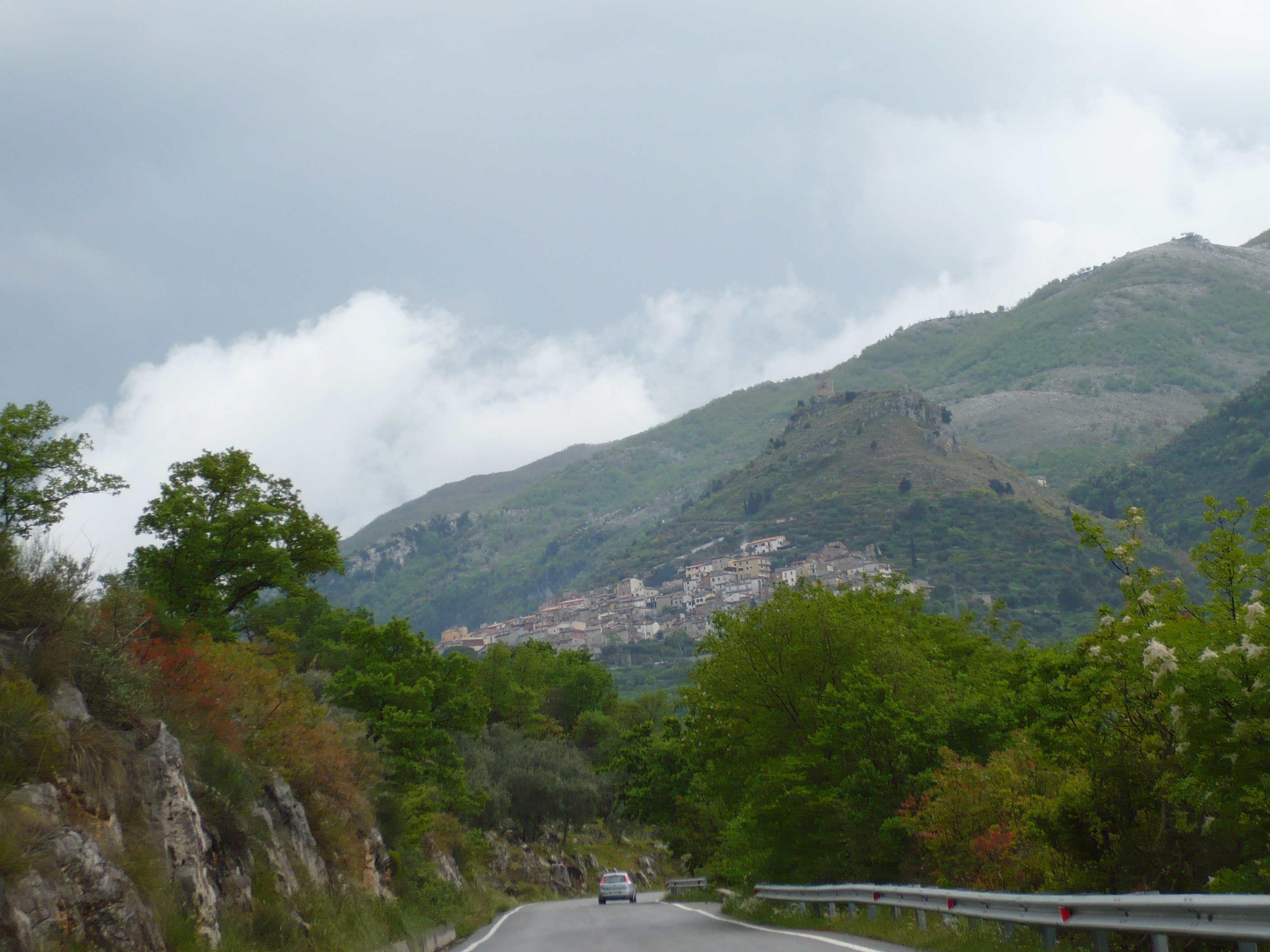
- View of Esperia

- Coat of arms

- Location within Italy Location within Lazio
- Coordinates: 41°23′N 13°41′E
- Country: Italy
- Region: Lazio
- Province: Frosinone (FR)
- Frazioni: Badia di Esperia, Monticelli, Roccaguglielma (Esperia Superiore), San Pietro in Curolis (Esperia Inferiore)

Government
  - Mayor: Giuseppe Villani

Area
  - Total: 108.7 km^{2} (42.0 sq mi)
- Elevation: 370 m (1,210 ft)

Population (28 February 2017)
  - Total: 3,801
  - Density: 34.97/km^{2} (90.57/sq mi)
- Demonym: Esperiani
- Time zone: UTC+1 (CET)
  - Summer (DST): UTC+2 (CEST)
- Postal code: 03045
- Dialing code: 0776
- Patron saint: San Clino Abate
- Website: http://en.comuni-italiani.it/060/031/

Esperia is a comune (municipality) in the Province of Frosinone in the Italian region Lazio, located about 110 kilometres (68 mi) southeast of Rome and about 40 kilometres (25 mi) southeast of Frosinone. It is located within the Monti Aurunci Natural Park.

== History ==
According to some theories, the foundation of the town would be linked to the destruction of the Roman colony of Interamna Lirenas, although the first historically documented human presence dates to the foundation of several monasteries, with the annexed boroughs, by the Abbey of Montecassino (10th century).

The name "Esperia" was chosen in 1867 when the current frazioni of Roccaguglielma and San Pietro merged into a single municipality, with the former as the municipal seat.

During World War II Esperia was one of the towns that suffered heavily from "Marocchinate," the mass rape committed after the Battle of Monte Cassino by Goumiers, Moroccan colonial troops of the French Expeditionary Corps. Esperia's mayor at the time reported that in his town, 700 women out of 2,500 inhabitants were raped and that some had died as a result.

Johnny Roselli, infamous American mobster, was born in Esperia in 1905; his real name was Filippo Sacco.

== Attractions ==
The church of Santa Maria Maggiore and San Filippo Neri in Esperia Superiore houses a painting by Taddeo Zuccari and a 1521 bas-relief. The Baroque Lauretana Chapel, in Esperia Inferiore dedicated to the Madonna di Loreto has a 16th-century wooden Madonna and several paintings by Luca Giordano.

Other churches include San Pietro in Esperia Inferiore, San Donato on Monte D'Oro, Santa Maria di Montevetro on Monte Montevetro (with 15th-century frescoes) and the 16th-century Sanctuary of Madonna delle Grazie, located near the remains of the castle, Santa Maria Maggiore in Monticelli, San Francesco adjoined to the Casa di Riposo in Esperia Superiore, Santa Rosa located in Badia di Esperia. The ancient monastery of San Pietro in Foresta located in Monticelli, now only a tower remains today.

Dinosaur footprints were discovered in 2006 in the locality of San Martino.
