= Castelliri =

- Comune
- Comune di Castelliri
- Location within Italy Location within Lazio
- Coordinates: 41°41′N 13°33′E
- Country: Italy
- Region: Lazio
- Province: Frosinone (FR)

Government
  - Mayor: Fabio Abballe

Area
  - Total: 15.5 km^{2} (6.0 sq mi)
- Elevation: 261 m (856 ft)

Population (30 June 2017)
  - Total: 3,424
  - Density: 221/km^{2} (572/sq mi)
- Demonym: Castellucciani
- Time zone: UTC+1 (CET)
  - Summer (DST): UTC+2 (CEST)
- Postal code: 03030
- Dialing code: 0776
- Patron saint: Santa Maria Salomè
- Saint day: October 22
- Website: Official website

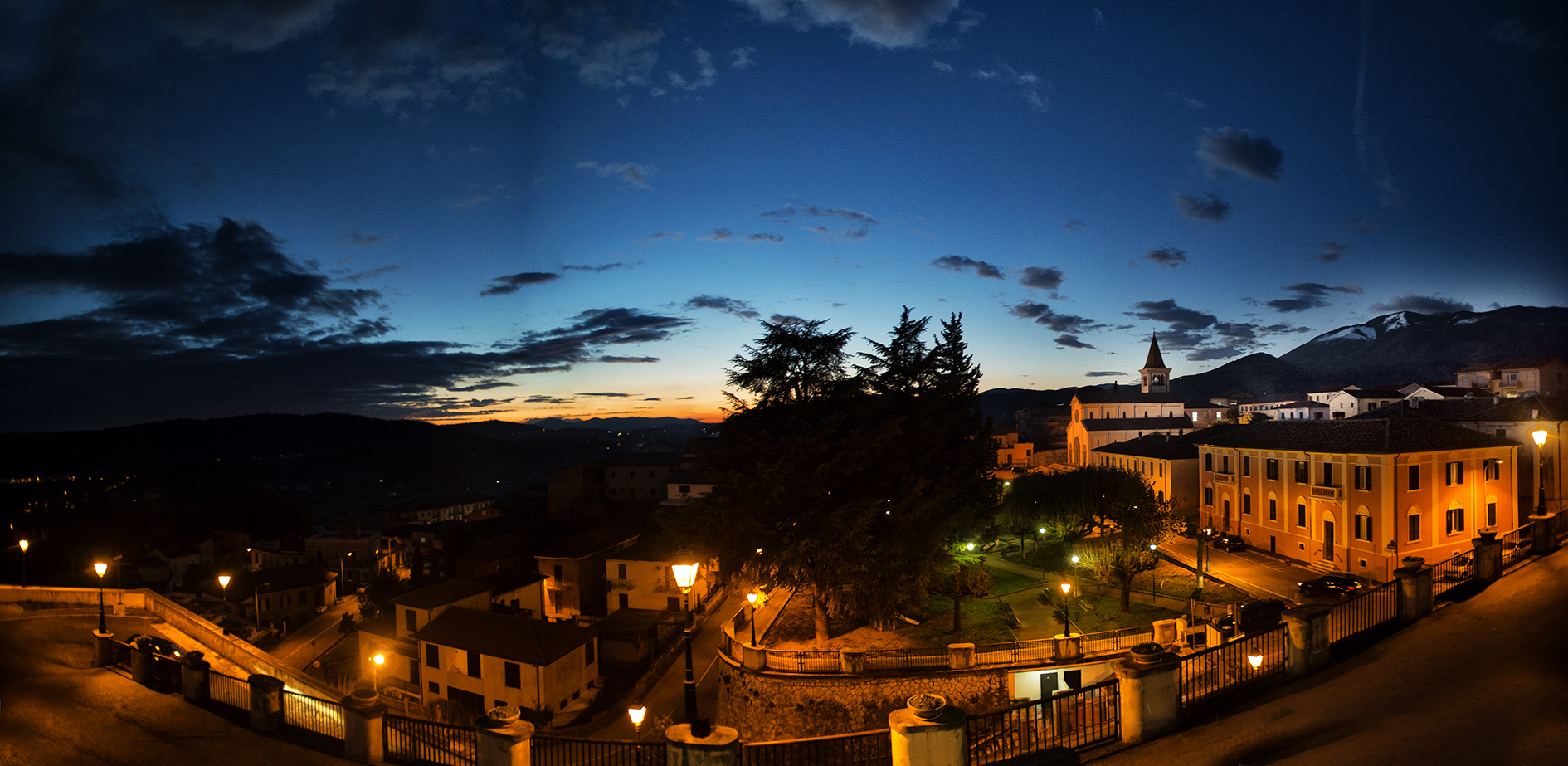
The skyline of Castelliri at twilight in 2013

Castelliri is a comune (municipality) of c. 3,500 inhabitants in the province of Frosinone in the Italian region Lazio, located in the valley of the Liri, about 90 kilometres (56 mi) southeast of Rome and about 20 kilometres (12 mi) northeast of Frosinone.

Castelliri borders the following municipalities: Arpino, Isola del Liri, Monte San Giovanni Campano, Sora.
