= Villa Santo Stefano =

- Comune
- Comune di Villa Santo Stefano
- Coat of arms

- Location within Italy Location within Lazio
- Coordinates: 41°31′N 13°19′E
- Country: Italy
- Region: Lazio
- Province: Frosinone (FR)

Government
  - Mayor: Giovanni Iorio

Area
  - Total: 20.3 km^{2} (7.8 sq mi)
- Elevation: 205 m (673 ft)

Population (28 February 2017)
  - Total: 1,690
  - Density: 83.3/km^{2} (216/sq mi)
- Demonym: Santostefanesi
- Time zone: UTC+1 (CET)
  - Summer (DST): UTC+2 (CEST)
- Postal code: 03020
- Dialing code: 0775
- Website: Official website

Villa Santo Stefano is a comune (municipality) in the Province of Frosinone in the Italian region Lazio, located about 80 kilometres (50 mi) southeast of Rome and about 13 kilometres (8 mi) south of Frosinone.

Villa Santo Stefano borders the following municipalities: Amaseno, Castro dei Volsci, Ceccano, Giuliano di Roma, Prossedi.
