= Interamna Lirenas =

Italian Roman archaeological site

- Location within Lazio
- 41°25′39.356″N 13°45′14.3424″E
- Type: settlement
- Cultures: Roman Republic
- Region: Lazio

History
- Built: 312 BC

Site notes
- Excavation dates: 2010–present
- Archaeologists: Alessandro Launaro
- Condition: ruined
- Public access: yes

Interamna Lirenas was an ancient Roman colony near the current Pignataro Interamna, in the southern province of Frosinone, central Italy.

Modern archaeological excavations at the site commenced in 2010.

== History ==
Interamna Lirenas was founded in 312 BC as a colonia of Latins in the ager casinas, on the route of the Via Latina. It was situated at the confluence of the Liri and Rio Spalla Bassa rivers, whence the name "Interamna" (meaning "between the rivers").

Interamna Lirenas served as a military base during the Samnite Wars, leading to its destruction by the Samnites in 294 BC. It was again ravaged by Hannibal in 212 BC; since it later sided with Carthage, after the Carthaginian defeat at Zama in 202 BC it was forced by Rome to pay heavy tribute.

It became a municipium in about 88 BC following the Social Wars when its population became Roman citizens.

In 46 BC Julius Caesar became patronus of the city as its strategic location between a river and a major road made it a busy node in the regional network, valuable to Caesar during the civil wars and one of only four towns known to share this privilege. The town received further settled veterans ca. 40 BC.

The town was thought to have been a relative backwater based on the relative lack of imported pottery, but recent archaeology has raised its importance, with evidence showing that it resisted the generally accepted decline of Italy in this period until the later part of the 3rd century AD, and around 300 years later than previously assumed.

== Archaeology ==
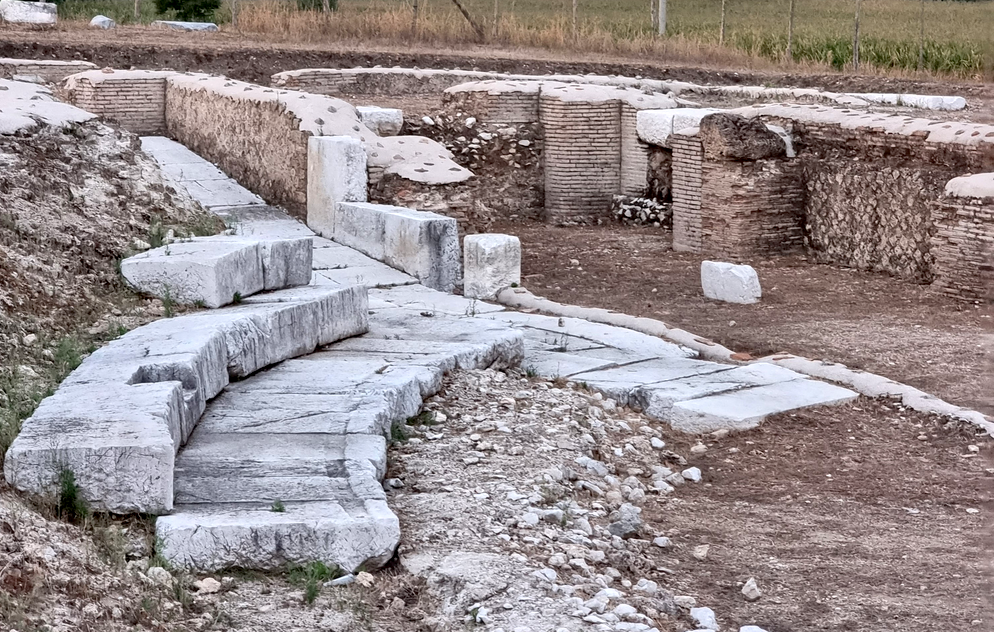
The theatre at Interamna Lirenas

Excavated remains include a rare roofed theatre faced with exotic marbles from the central and eastern Mediterranean. A port on the river Liri with warehouses fostered trade between the major centres to the north of Aquinum and Casinum, and Minturnae and the Tyrrhenian coast to the southeast.

There were three thermal bath complexes, the largest near the forum with a large swimming enclosed within a portico from 3rd–4th centuries.

The archaeological site has been sampled by use of geophysical techniques (including magnetometry).

An inscribed ancient sundial donated by Marcus Novius Tubula after his election as plebeian tribune in Rome was discovered in the ruins of the theatre in 2017.

By 2023, the excavations, conducted under the auspices of Cambridge University, had discovered remains including a roofed theatre, market, and river port.

== Sources ==
- Bellini, G. R.; Launaro, A.; Millett, M. (2014). "Roman colonial landscapes: Interamna Lirenas and its territory through antiquity". Papers of the Royal Netherlands Institute in Rome. 62: 255–275.
- Launaro, Alessandro (2023). Interamna Lirenas: A Roman town in Central Italy revealed. McDonald Institute Monographs. ISBN 9781913344108.
- Eliodoro Savino (2005). Campania tardoantica (284-604 d.C.). Edipuglia srl. pp. 187–. ISBN 978-88-7228-257-1.
