= Fumone =

- Comune
- Comune di Fumone
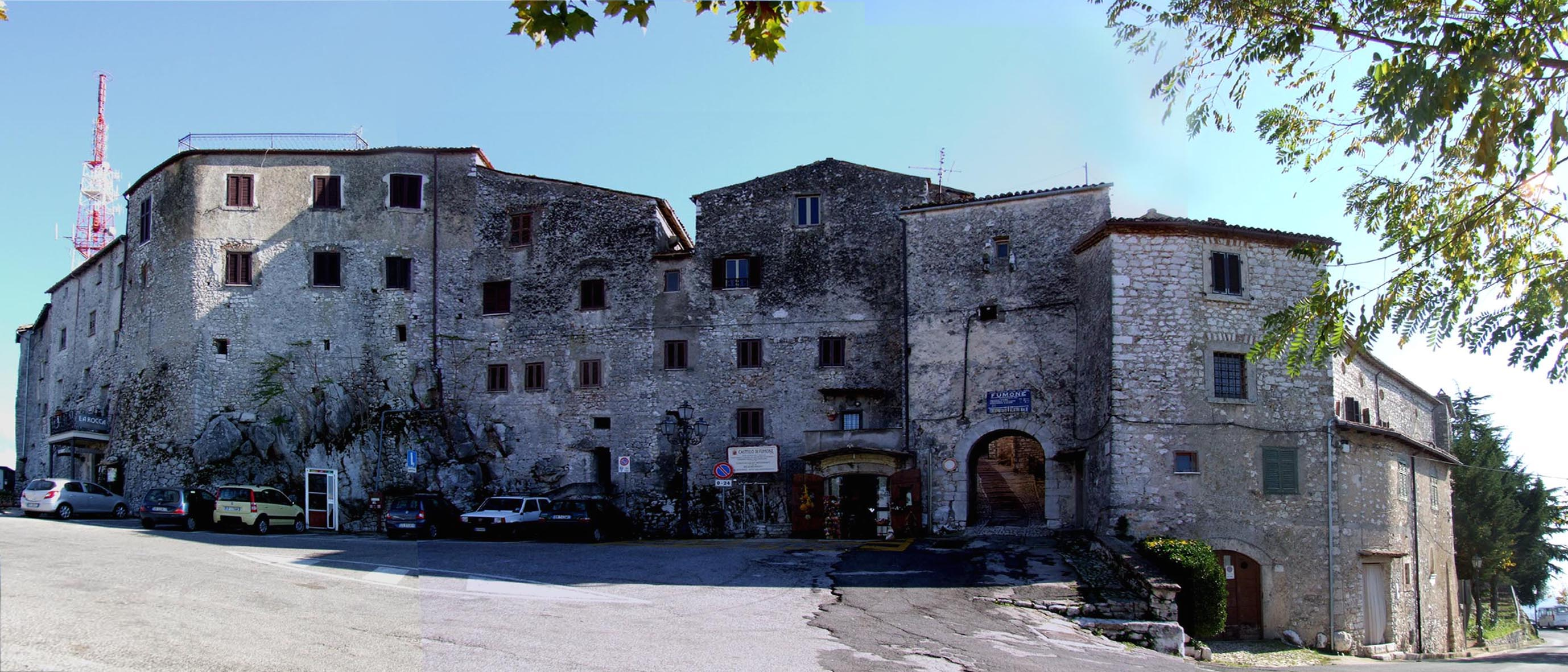

- Fumone within the Province of Frosinone

- Location within Italy Location within Lazio
- Coordinates: 41°44′N 13°17′E
- Country: Italy
- Region: Lazio
- Province: Frosinone (FR)

Government
  - Mayor: Matteo Campoli

Area
  - Total: 14.8 km^{2} (5.7 sq mi)
- Elevation: 783 m (2,569 ft)

Population (2008)
  - Total: 2,242
  - Density: 151/km^{2} (392/sq mi)
- Demonym: Fumonesi
- Time zone: UTC+1 (CET)
  - Summer (DST): UTC+2 (CEST)
- Postal code: 03010
- Dialing code: 0775
- Patron saint: St. Sebastian
- Website: Official website

Fumone is a comune (municipality) in the Province of Frosinone in the Italian region of Lazio, located about 70 kilometres (43 mi) southeast of Rome and about 12 kilometres (7 mi) northwest of Frosinone.

== Geography ==
The town is on an isolated conical hill upon the Sacco Valley. It borders with the municipalities of Alatri, Anagni, Ferentino, and Trivigliano.

== Main sights ==
The castle of Fumone was the main Papal stronghold in southern Latium. Today it houses an archaeological museum. Pope Celestine V was jailed here after his renunciation of the papal throne.

Also notable is the church of Santa Maria Annunziata, which houses relics of St. Sebastian.
