= Sant'Andrea del Garigliano =

Comune in Lazio, Italy

- Comune
- Comune di Sant'Andrea del Garigliano
- Coat of arms

- Location within Italy Location within Lazio
- Coordinates: 41°22′N 13°50′E
- Country: Italy
- Region: Lazio
- Province: Frosinone (FR)

Government
  - Mayor: Giovanni Rossi

Area
  - Total: 16.9 km^{2} (6.5 sq mi)
- Elevation: 176 m (577 ft)

Population (28 February 2017)
  - Total: 1,481
  - Density: 87.6/km^{2} (227/sq mi)
- Demonym: Santandreani
- Time zone: UTC+1 (CET)
  - Summer (DST): UTC+2 (CEST)
- Postal code: 03040
- Dialing code: 0776
- Website: Official website

Sant'Andrea del Garigliano is a comune (municipality) in the Province of Frosinone in the Italian region Lazio, located about 130 kilometres (81 miles) southeast of Rome and about 50 km (31 mi) southeast of Frosinone.

Sant'Andrea del Garigliano borders the following municipalities: Castelforte, Rocca d'Evandro, Sant'Ambrogio sul Garigliano, Sant'Apollinare, Vallemaio.
