= Guarcino =

- Comune
- Comune di Guarcino
- Location within Italy Location within Lazio
- Coordinates: 41°48′N 13°19′E
- Country: Italy
- Region: Lazio
- Province: Frosinone (FR)

Government
  - Mayor: Urbano Restante

Area
  - Total: 42.3 km^{2} (16.3 sq mi)
- Elevation: 625 m (2,051 ft)

Population (31 December 2010)
  - Total: 1,700
  - Density: 40/km^{2} (100/sq mi)
- Demonym: Guarcinesi
- Time zone: UTC+1 (CET)
  - Summer (DST): UTC+2 (CEST)
- Postal code: 03016
- Dialing code: 0775
- Patron saint: Sant'Agnello
- Saint day: 14 December
- Website: Official website

Guarcino is a comune (municipality) in the Province of Frosinone in the Italian region Lazio, located about 70 kilometres (43 mi) east of Rome and about 20 kilometres (12 mi) north of Frosinone in the Monti Ernici area.

== History ==
It is the ancient Varcenum of the Hernici, likely founded in the 8th century BC. After the Roman conquest and the fall of the Western Roman Empire, it was a free commune and later a fief in the Papal States. Pope Boniface VIII had a palace in the town.
