= Vico nel Lazio =

- Comune
- Comune di Vico nel Lazio
- Location within Italy Location within Lazio
- Coordinates: 41°47′N 13°21′E
- Country: Italy
- Region: Lazio
- Province: Frosinone (FR)
- Frazioni: Pitocco

Government
  - Mayor: Claudio Guerriero

Area
  - Total: 45.8 km^{2} (17.7 sq mi)
- Elevation: 720 m (2,360 ft)

Population (31 December 2010)
  - Total: 2,314
  - Density: 50.5/km^{2} (131/sq mi)
- Demonym: Vichensi
- Time zone: UTC+1 (CET)
  - Summer (DST): UTC+2 (CEST)
- Postal code: 03010
- Dialing code: 0775

Vico nel Lazio is a comune (municipality) in the Province of Frosinone in the Italian region Lazio, located about 70 kilometres (43 mi) east of Rome and about 15 kilometres (9 mi) north of Frosinone.
