= Caetani =

Italian noble family

- Country: Italy Former countries: Papal States; Kingdom of Naples; Kingdom of the Two Sicilies; Kingdom of Italy
- Founded: 12th century
- Titles: Prince of Gioia; Prince of Piedimonte; Prince of Caserta; Prince of Teano; Prince of Bassiano; Duke of Laurenzana; Duke of Sermoneta; Count of Alife; Count of Fondi; Count of Morcone; Count of Torre Cajetani; Patrician of Anagni; Lord of Torre Cajetani

The House of Caetani (Italian pronunciation: [kaeˈtaːni]), or Gaetani, is the name of an Italian noble family, originally from the city of Gaeta, connected by some to the lineage of the lords of the Duchy of Gaeta, as well as to the patrician Gaetani of the Republic of Pisa. It played an important role in Rome, in the Papal States and in the Kingdom of Naples, and later in the Kingdom of the Two Sicilies.

== Origins ==
The Gaetani coat of arms during the time of Boniface VIII

The House of Caetani, or Gaetani, according to a family tradition, was descendant of the Dukes of Gaeta. Nevertheless, the family had no more great importance in Rome until the elections of Giovanni Caetani and Benedetto Caetani to the papacy as Pope Gelasius II and Pope Boniface VIII in 1118 and 1294 respectively, when they at once became the most notable in the city. The pope helped them to buy Sermoneta, Bassiano, Ninfa and San Donato (1297, 1300), and the marquisate of Ancona in 1300, while Charles II of Anjou created the pope's brother count of Caserta.

Giordano Roffredo Caetani by his marriage with Giovanna dell'Aquila, heiress of the counts of Fondi, in 1297 acquired the title of counts of Fondi, and his grandson Giacomo acquired the lordships of Piedimonte and Gioia. The Caetani proved brave warriors and formed a bodyguard to protect Boniface VIII from his many foes. During the 14th and 15th centuries their feuds with the Colonna caused frequent disturbances in Rome and the Campagna, sometimes amounting to civil war. They also played an important role as Neapolitan nobles: in particular, Onorato I Caetani was a powerful baron in what is now southern Lazio and one of the main supporters of Antipopes Clement VII and Benedict XIII. In 1500 Pope Alexander VI, in his attempt to crush the great Roman feudal nobility, confiscated the Caetani fiefs and gave them to his daughter Lucrezia Borgia; but they afterwards regained them.

== Lines ==
Until the 20th century, there were two lines of the Caetani family - Caetani and Caetani d'Aragona (or Gaetani Dell'Aquila d'Aragona). The Caetani line ended with the last male descendant's death in 1961.

=== Caetani ===
Coat of arms of the early modern Caetani of Pisa

Caetani, princes of Teano and dukes of Sermoneta, founded by Giacobello Caetani, whose grandson, Guglielmo Caetani, was granted the duchy of Sermoneta by Pope Pius III in 1503, the marquisate of Cisterna being conferred on the family by Sixtus V in 1585. In 1642, Francesco, the 7th Duke of Sermoneta, acquired by marriage the county of Caserta, which was exchanged for the principality of Teano in 1750. The 19th century head of the house, Onorato Caetani, 14th Duke of Sermoneta, 4th Prince of Teano, Duke of San Marco, Marquis of Cisterna, etc. (1842 – 1917), was a senator of the kingdom of Italy, and was minister for foreign affairs for a short time. His son Gelasio Caetani rose to fame during the First World War as a military mining engineer.

The last agnate (male member) of the family was the noted composer, Don Roffredo Caetani, 17th Duke of Sermoneta and 8th Prince of Teano (1871–1961); his wife, Marguerite Chapin, founded and edited the literary journal Botteghe Oscure. His niece Topazia (1921–1990) married the composer and conductor Igor Markevitch (1912–1983) and was the mother of the conductor Oleg Caetani (b. 1956), who perpetuates his mother's surname as an enate, a uterine member, of the Italian noble family.

=== Caetani d'Aragona (or Gaetani dell'Aquila d'Aragona) and Bourbon del Caetani ===
Caetani d'Aragona, Princes of Piedimonte, and Dukes of Laurenzana, founded by Onorato II Caetani, Count of Fondi, Alife and Morcone, Lord of Piedimonte and Gioia, in 1454. The additional surname of Aragona was assumed in 1466. The duchy of Laurenzana, in the kingdom of Naples, was acquired by Alfonso Gaetani by his marriage in 1606 with Giulia di Ruggiero, Duchess of Laurenzana. The lordship of Piedimonte was raised to a principality in 1715.

According to family records and genealogical tradition, Lelia de Bourbon del Monte Caetani Sforza was married to a noble portuguese, Luís Virgílio Gomes Martinho Bragança and was a grandaunt of Princess Lelia Caetani (1913–1977). Her family line continued through descendants of Luso-Italian heritage who today reside in Brazil, preserving a historical connection between the Brazilian and Italian branches of the family. The family is currently represented by Don Carlos Egerton Braganza de Bourbon del Caetani Sforza (b.1993), Duca di Sermoneta.

The family D'Aragona is currently represented by Don Bonifacio Gaetani Dell'Aquilla D'Aragona, Duca di Laurenzana e Principe di Piedimonte (b. 1950), and whose heir is Conte Don Giovanni Gaetani dell’Aquila d’Aragona (* 1973) who married Ginevra Elkann (the sister of John Elkann, daughter of Alain Elkann, and granddaughter of Gianni Agnelli) in 2009.
