= Villa Latina =

- Comune
- Comune di Villa Latina
- Coat of arms

- Location within Italy Location within Lazio
- Coordinates: 41°37′N 13°50′E
- Country: Italy
- Region: Lazio
- Province: Frosinone (FR)

Government
  - Mayor: Luigi Rossi

Area
  - Total: 17.02 km^{2} (6.57 sq mi)
- Elevation: 415 m (1,362 ft)

Population (28 February 2017)
  - Total: 1,215
  - Density: 71.39/km^{2} (184.9/sq mi)
- Demonym: Agnonesi
- Time zone: UTC+1 (CET)
  - Summer (DST): UTC+2 (CEST)
- Postal code: 03040
- Dialing code: 0776

Villa Latina is a comune (municipality) in the Province of Frosinone in the Italian region Lazio, located about 120 kilometres (75 mi) southeast of Rome and about 40 kilometres (25 mi) east of Frosinone.
