= Piedimonte San Germano =

- Comune
- Comune di Piedimonte San Germano
- Location within Italy Location within Lazio
- Coordinates: 41°30′N 13°44′E
- Country: Italy
- Region: Lazio
- Province: Frosinone (FR)

Government
  - Mayor: Gioacchino Ferdinandi

Area
  - Total: 17.39 km^{2} (6.71 sq mi)
- Elevation: 115 m (377 ft)

Population (28 February 2017)
  - Total: 6,515
  - Density: 374.6/km^{2} (970.3/sq mi)
- Demonym: Pedemontani
- Time zone: UTC+1 (CET)
  - Summer (DST): UTC+2 (CEST)
- Postal code: 03030
- Dialing code: 0776
- Patron saint: St. Amasius
- Website: Official website

Piedimonte San Germano (locally Prmont) is a comune (municipality) in the province of Frosinone in the Italian region of Lazio, located in the Liri River valley about 110 kilometres (68 mi) southeast of Rome and about 35 kilometres (22 mi) southeast of Frosinone.

It is home to the Fiat Cassino Plant production plant.
