= Trivigliano =

- Comune
- Comune di Trivigliano
- Location within Italy Location within Lazio
- Coordinates: 41°47′N 13°16′E
- Country: Italy
- Region: Lazio
- Province: Frosinone (FR)
- Frazioni: San Giovanni, Pratovalle, Sassotello, 3 Fontane, Cerreta, Valcagnano, Canterno, Padoni, Collitimi, Pezze, Colle Jorio, Rasella, Monte Santa Croce, Dello Spreco

Government
  - Mayor: Gianluca Latini

Area
  - Total: 12.7 km^{2} (4.9 sq mi)
- Elevation: 780 m (2,560 ft)

Population (31 December 2010)
  - Total: 1,743
  - Density: 137/km^{2} (355/sq mi)
- Demonym: Triviglianesi
- Time zone: UTC+1 (CET)
  - Summer (DST): UTC+2 (CEST)
- Postal code: 03010
- Dialing code: 0775
- Patron saint: St. Oliva
- Saint day: 11 June

Trivigliano is a comune (municipality) in the Province of Frosinone in the Italian region Lazio, located about 60 kilometres (37 mi) east of Rome and about 20 kilometres (12 mi) northwest of Frosinone, in the Monti Ernici area.
