= Colle San Magno =

Comune in Frosinone, Italy

- Comune
- Comune di Colle San Magno
- Coat of arms

- Location within Italy Location within Lazio
- Coordinates: 41°33′N 13°42′E
- Country: Italy
- Region: Lazio
- Province: Frosinone (FR)

Government
  - Mayor: Valentina Cambone

Area
  - Total: 44.8 km^{2} (17.3 sq mi)
- Elevation: 540 m (1,770 ft)

Population (31 December 2021)
  - Total: 636
  - Density: 14.2/km^{2} (36.8/sq mi)
- Demonym: Collacciani
- Time zone: UTC+1 (CET)
  - Summer (DST): UTC+2 (CEST)
- Postal code: 03030
- Dialing code: 0776
- Patron saint: St. Magnus
- Saint day: 19 August
- Website: Official website

Colle San Magno (locally Glio Colle) is a comune (municipality) in the Province of Frosinone in the Italian region Lazio, located about 110 kilometres (68 mi) southeast of Rome and about 30 kilometres (19 mi) southeast of Frosinone.

Its name refers to St. Magnus of Anagni. The town was founded in the 11th century, and it was later ruled by the D'Avalos and, from the 16th century, by the Boncompagni. In 1796 it was acquired by the Kingdom of Naples.

Attractions include the medieval castle, the old asphalt mines and the church of S.M. Assunta.
