= Castelnuovo Parano =

- Comune
- Comune di Castelnuovo Parano
- Coat of arms

- Location within Italy Location within Lazio
- Coordinates: 41°22′N 13°45′E
- Country: Italy
- Region: Lazio
- Province: Frosinone (FR)
- Frazioni: Casali, Terra, Valli-Sant'Antonio, Cisterna, Pimpinelli

Government
  - Mayor: Oreste De Bellis

Area
  - Total: 9.88 km^{2} (3.81 sq mi)
- Elevation: 310 m (1,020 ft)

Population (28 February 2017)
  - Total: 884
  - Density: 89.5/km^{2} (232/sq mi)
- Demonym: Castelnovesi
- Time zone: UTC+1 (CET)
  - Summer (DST): UTC+2 (CEST)
- Postal code: 03040
- Dialing code: 0776
- Patron saint: St. Maurus
- Saint day: 15 January
- Website: Official website

Castelnuovo Parano is a comune (municipality) in the province of Frosinone in the Italian region Lazio, located about 120 kilometres (75 miles) southeast of Rome and about 45 kilometres (28 mi) southeast of Frosinone.

It originates from a castle built here in 1059 by abbot Desiderius of Montecassino to defend the area between Fratte and Traetto. The area was severely damaged during World War II due to its position across the Gustav Line. After the end of the conflict, much of the population emigrated.
