= Province of Frosinone =

Province of Italy

Coordinates: 41°38′N 13°21′E

Province of Frosinone Provincia di Frosinone (Italian)
- Province
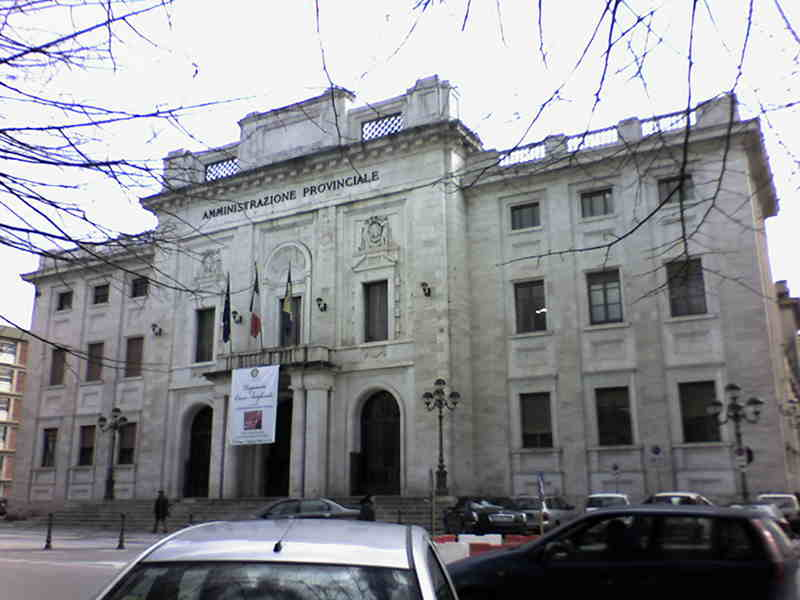
- Palazzo Gramsci, the provincial seat

- Flag Coat of arms

- Location of the province of Frosinone in Italy
- Country: Italy
- Region: Lazio
- Established: 1927
- Capital(s): Frosinone
- Municipalities: 91

Government
  - President: Luca Di Stefano (PD)

Area
  - Total: 3,247.08 km^{2} (1,253.70 sq mi)

Population (2026)
  - Total: 460,266
  - Density: 141.748/km^{2} (367.125/sq mi)

GDP
  - Total: €10.659 billion (2015)
  - Per capita: €21,490 (2015)
- Time zone: UTC+1 (CET)
  - Summer (DST): UTC+2 (CEST)
- Postal code: 03100
- Telephone prefix: 0775
- Vehicle registration: FR
- ISTAT code: 060

The province of Frosinone (Italian: provincia di Frosinone) is a province in the region of Lazio in Italy. Its capital is the city of Frosinone.

It has a population of 460,266 in an area of 3,247.08 square kilometres (1,253.70 sq mi) across its 91 municipalities.

The province was established by royal decree on 6 December 1926 with territories belonging to the then provinces of Rome and Caserta. The areas of the then province of Caserta were the left valley of the Liri-Garigliano river, the district of Sora, the Valle di Comino, the district of Cassino, the Gulf of Formia and Gaeta, the Pontine Islands, which until then had been for centuries included in the Province called Terra di Lavoro, of the Kingdom of Naples (or of the Two Sicilies). Most of these territories were part of the ancient Latium adiectum.

== History ==
The first traces of human presence in the provincial territory date back to prehistoric times: a famous skull of Homo erectus (Homo cepranensis, in the Prehistorical Museum of Pofi), dating from 800,000 years ago, constitutes the most ancient finding of the Homo species in Europe.

In historical times (the 10th-9th centuries BC), the area, previously occupied by the so-called Pelasgic civilization, was settled by Indo-European colonists. This arrival is referred to in numerous legends, such as those of Aeneas and Saturn. The latter, ousted by Olympus, was said to come to Lazio to help the men and found seven cities whose name begins with "A" (for example, Alatri and Anagni).

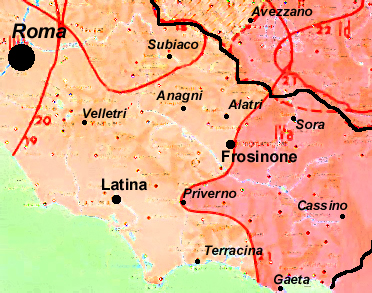
Linguistic map of Southern Lazio: Central Italian in pink and Southern Italian (Neapolitan dialects) in magenta

In the 7th century BC, the area of what is now the province entered the orbit of Rome, which made it the so-called Latium adiectum ("Adjoined Lazio"). However, Rome needed some 300 years to obtain a definitive victory against the Volsci and the Hernici. The territory was colonized by thousands of Latins and Romans without citizenship, unlike the areas on the coast, where there were mainly small colonies of Roman citizens. Also, the original inhabitants became Romanized after the Social and the Samnite Wars.

After the fall of the Western Roman Empire, the northern part of the province (officially referred to as Campagna since the 12th century) belonged to the Papal States, while the region south of the Liri orbited around the powers of Benevento and then Naples.

In the Middle Ages, the abbey of Monte Cassino was always a major landowner and a politically renowned element of the area. The southeastern part was a frontier area which was long claimed by the other major powers of the time, the Duchies of Benevento and Gaeta and the County of Aversa: annexed to the Kingdom of Naples under the Normans (12th century), from the late 14th century it became part of the county and then, with an independent status, of the Duchy of Sora. Pontecorvo remained a Papal enclave from 1463.

More than 50 years after the 1871 unification of Italy, the Fascist government made Frosinone the capital of a province which unified different areas that belonged to the Papal and Neapolitan states. This action generated criticism, as these states were considered too different in history, language and culture, especially by the Bourbon-nostalgic party that maintained a strong position in southern Italy for many decades.

The creation of a new province, with capitals in Cassino, Formia and Sora, and comprising the former territories of the Kingdom of Naples, has been proposed.

== Geography ==
The province largely follows the territory of the low and middle Latin Valley, a larger region that extends from south of Rome to Cassino. In the eastern area, on the other hand, the Comino Valley extends along the border with Abruzzo.

The territorial boundaries are mostly marked by mountain ranges: the Ernici Mountains to the north and the Lepini Mountains to the southwest, the Ausoni and Aurunci Mountains to the south, the Mainarde to the northeast.

The mountain system of the territory of the province of Frosinone follows the natural development of the mountain ranges of the Italian peninsula; the two main systems are part of the central Apennines to the north, and the Lazio pre-Apennines to the south, divided by the low and middle Latin Valley crossed by the Sacco and Liri rivers.

== Government ==
=== Municipalities ===
The province has 91 municipalities:

- Acquafondata
- Acuto
- Alatri
- Alvito
- Amaseno
- Anagni
- Aquino
- Arce
- Arnara
- Arpino
- Atina
- Ausonia
- Belmonte Castello
- Boville Ernica
- Broccostella
- Campoli Appennino
- Casalattico
- Casalvieri
- Cassino
- Castelliri
- Castelnuovo Parano
- Castro dei Volsci
- Castrocielo
- Ceccano
- Ceprano
- Cervaro
- Colfelice
- Colle San Magno
- Collepardo
- Coreno Ausonio
- Esperia
- Falvaterra
- Ferentino
- Filettino
- Fiuggi
- Fontana Liri
- Fontechiari
- Frosinone
- Fumone
- Gallinaro
- Giuliano di Roma
- Guarcino
- Isola del Liri
- Monte San Giovanni Campano
- Morolo
- Paliano
- Pastena
- Patrica
- Pescosolido
- Picinisco
- Pico
- Piedimonte San Germano
- Piglio
- Pignataro Interamna
- Pofi
- Pontecorvo
- Posta Fibreno
- Ripi
- Rocca d'Arce
- Roccasecca
- San Biagio Saracinisco
- San Donato Val di Comino
- San Giorgio a Liri
- San Giovanni Incarico
- San Vittore del Lazio
- Sant'Ambrogio sul Garigliano
- Sant'Andrea del Garigliano
- Sant'Apollinare
- Sant'Elia Fiumerapido
- Santopadre
- Serrone
- Settefrati
- Sgurgola
- Sora
- Strangolagalli
- Supino
- Terelle
- Torre Cajetani
- Torrice
- Trevi nel Lazio
- Trivigliano
- Vallecorsa
- Vallemaio
- Vallerotonda
- Veroli
- Vicalvi
- Vico nel Lazio
- Villa Latina
- Villa Santa Lucia
- Villa Santo Stefano
- Viticuso

== Demographics ==
As of 2026, the population is 460,266, of which 49.3% are male, and 50.7% are female. Minors make up 14.0% of the population, and seniors make up 26.5%.

Historical population

Year	Pop.	±%
1861	157,625	—
1871	315,526	+100.2%
1881	311,067	−1.4%
1901	366,357	+17.8%
1911	398,259	+8.7%
1921	424,634	+6.6%
1931	432,065	+1.7%
1936	445,607	+3.1%

Year	Pop.	±%
1951	468,594	+5.2%
1961	438,254	−6.5%
1971	422,630	−3.6%
1981	460,395	+8.9%
1991	479,559	+4.2%
2001	484,566	+1.0%
2011	492,661	+1.7%
2021	470,689	−4.5%

Source: ISTAT

=== Immigration ===
As of 2025, immigrants make up 8.1% of the population. The 5 largest foreign countries of birth are Romania, Albania, France, Morocco, and Ukraine.

== Gallery ==
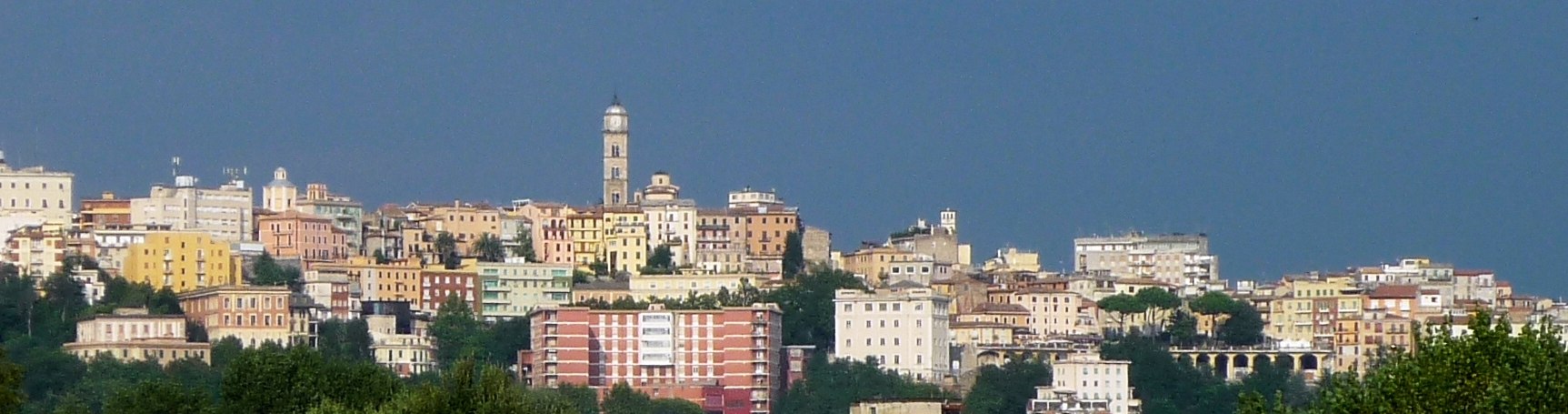
Frosinone

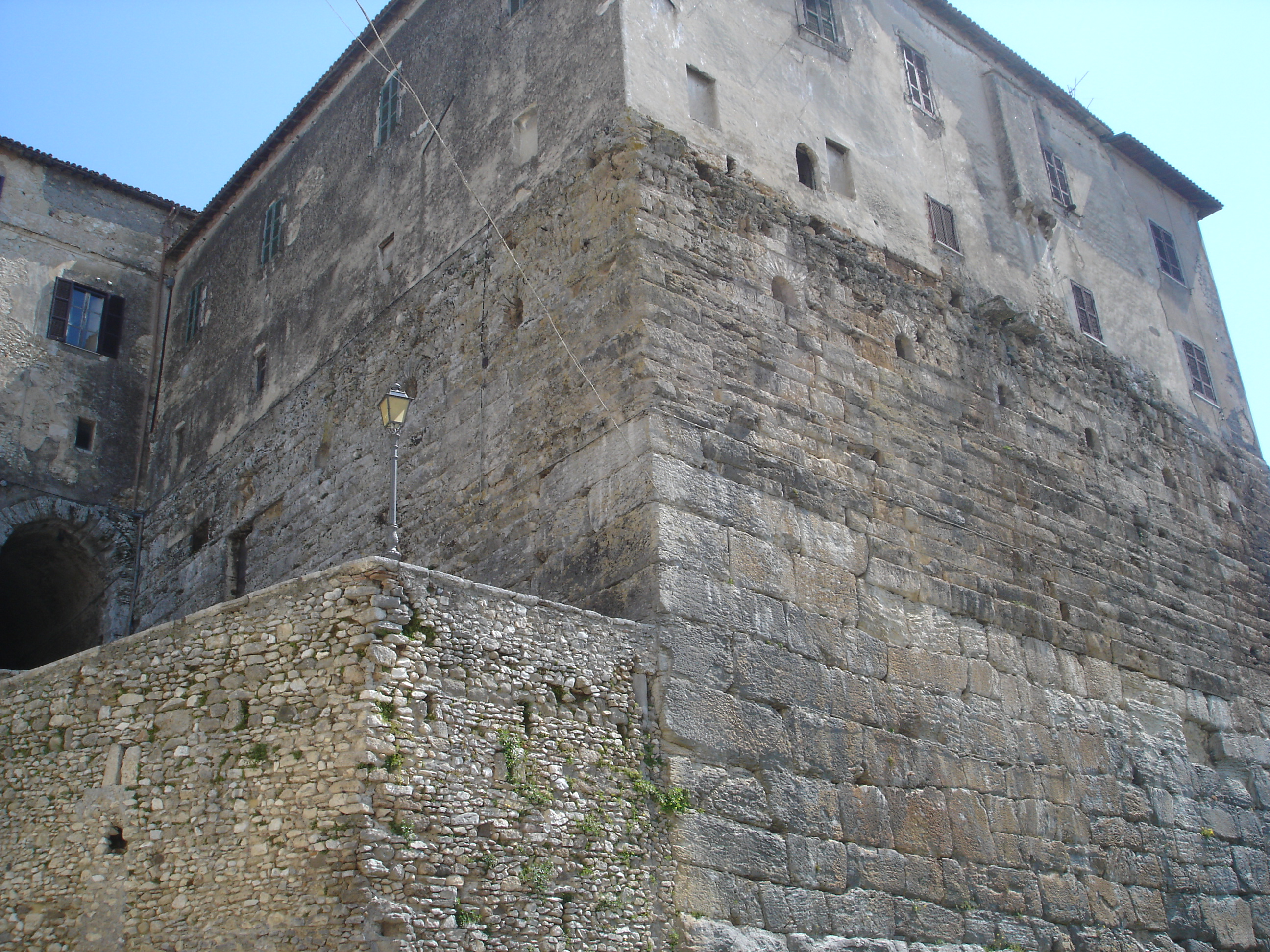
Acropolis of Ferentino

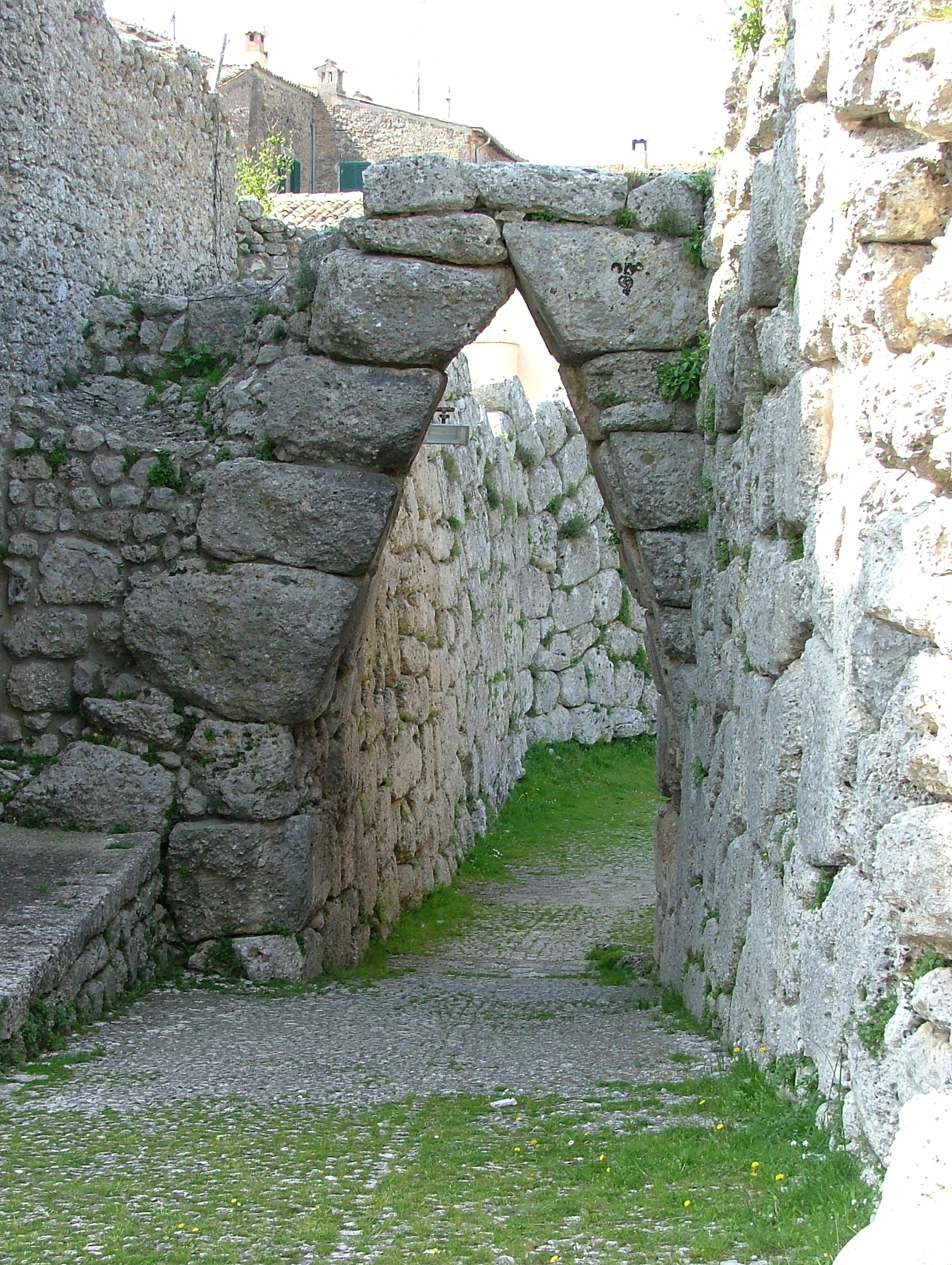
Arpino, pointed arch

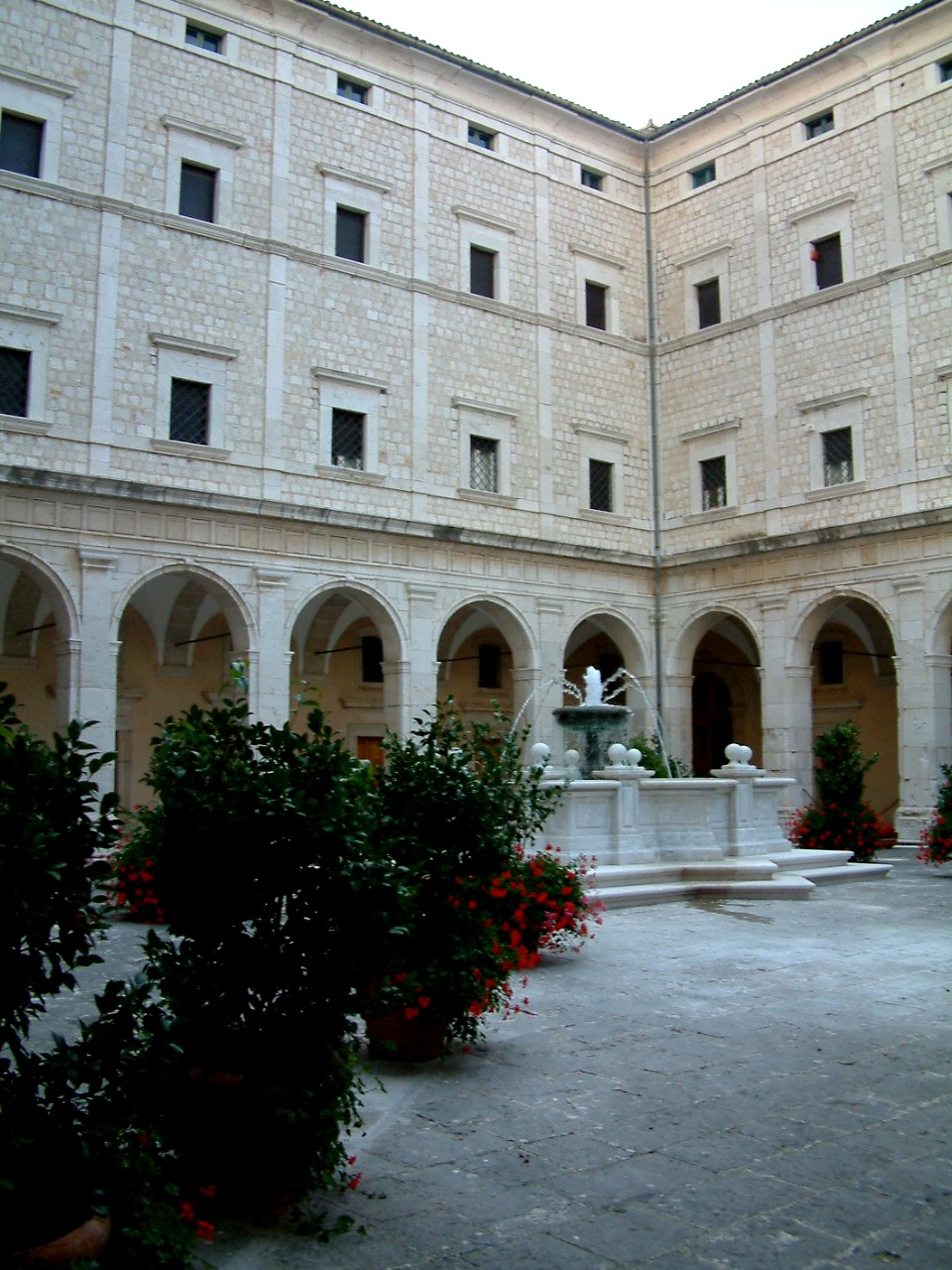
Montecassino Abbey Library
