= Pignataro Interamna =

- Comune
- Comune di Pignataro Interamna
- Coat of arms

- Location within Italy Location within Lazio
- Coordinates: 41°26′N 13°47′E
- Country: Italy
- Region: Lazio
- Province: Frosinone (FR)

Government
  - Mayor: Benedetto Murro

Area
  - Total: 24.41 km^{2} (9.42 sq mi)
- Elevation: 64 m (210 ft)

Population (31 October 2019)
  - Total: 2,500
  - Density: 100/km^{2} (270/sq mi)
- Demonym: Pignataresi
- Time zone: UTC+1 (CET)
  - Summer (DST): UTC+2 (CEST)
- Postal code: 03040
- Dialing code: 0776
- Website: Official website

Pignataro Interamna is a town and comune in the province of Frosinone, Lazio, Italy. It takes its name from the ancient Latin colony of Interamna Lirenas, founded by the Romans after the conquest of Casinum, an ancient Oscan city.

The town is in the southernmost part of the province of Frosinone.
