= Monti Ernici =

Mountain range in Italy

Coordinates: 41.8039°N 13.4888°E

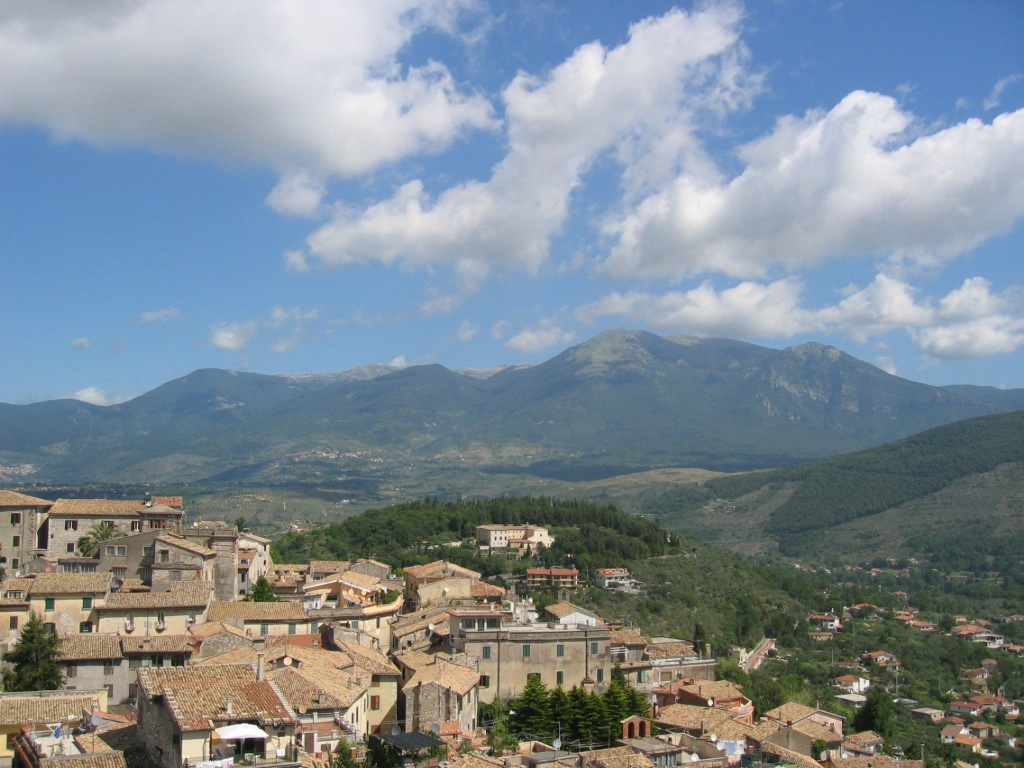
- A panorama of the Monti Ernici from the Acropolis of Alatri

Highest point
- Peak: Mount Passeggio
- Elevation: 2,064 m (6,772 ft)

Geography
- Country: Italy
- Regions: Lazio and Abruzzo
- Parent range: Alps

Geology
- Orogeny: Alpine orogeny

The Monti Ernici (Italian: "Mountains of the Hernici") are a mountain range in central Italy, part of the sub-Apennines of Lazio. They are bounded by the valley of the river Aniene to the north-east, that of the Liri to the east, and, from south to west, by the valleys of the Cosa and Sacco. They are the natural border between two central Italian regions, Lazio (north-east of the province of Frosinone) and Abruzzo (central-western province of L'Aquila).

The peaks have an average height of 2,000 m, the highest being the Mount Passeggio (2,064 m).

At the base of the Ernici Mounts is the cave of La Foce with a spring outflow in the Aniene river.

== Etymology ==
The mountain range takes its name from the Hernici, an ancient Italic population of Osco-Umbrian language who lived in the area.

== Description ==
The Monti Ernici range serves as the natural border between Lazio and Abruzzo, with western slopes being more intricate and less steep compared to the direct and steep eastern slopes. Peaks average around 2,000 meters, with Monte del Passeggio (2,064 m) as the highest, followed by Pizzo Deta (2,041 m), Monte Fragara (2,006 m), and Monte Ginepro (2,004 m), forming the southern massif (Pratelle - Prato di Campoli group).

The northern massif (Campocatino - Monna - Rotonaria) features a continuous ridge from Campocatino (1,800 m) to Monte Pozzotello (1,995 m), Monte Ortara (1,900 m), Monte Monna (1,952 m), Monte Fanfilli (1,952 m), and Monte Rotonaria (1,750 m). The westernmost peak is Monte Scalambra, near Roiate and Serrone. On the Abruzzo side, the Zompo Lo Schioppo nature reserve lies within Morino's territory.

== Points of interest ==
- Giardino Botanico di Collepardo
