= Frosinone =

- Comune
- Città di Frosinone
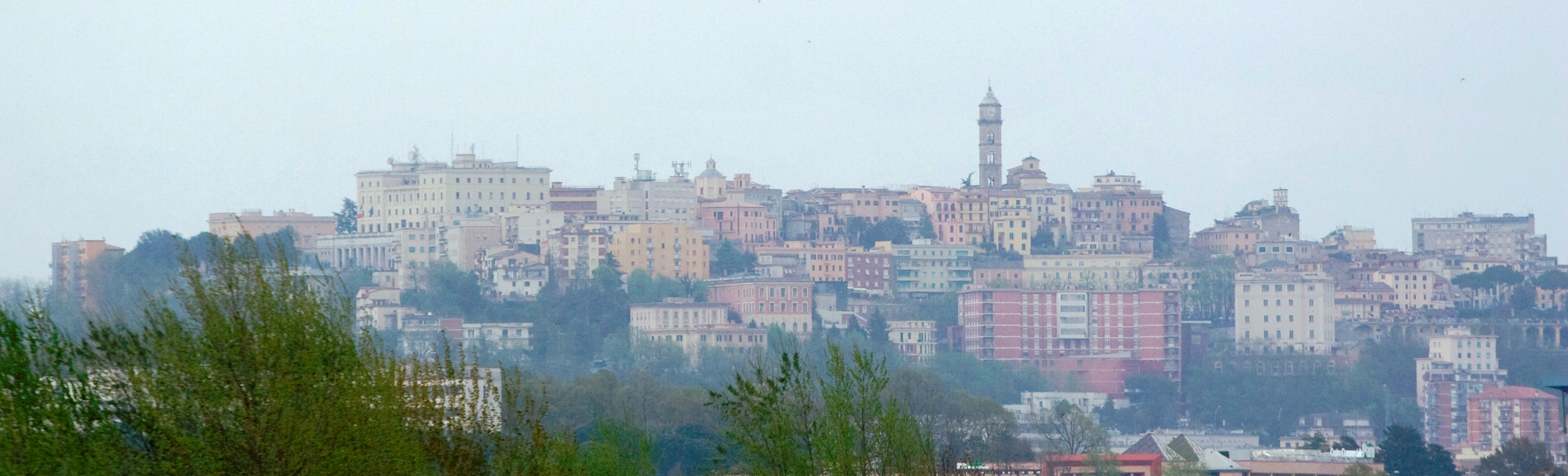
- Panorama of Frosinone

- Coat of arms

- Location within Italy Location within Lazio
- Coordinates: 41°38′N 13°21′E
- Country: Italy
- Region: Lazio
- Province: Frosinone (FR)
- Frazioni: Capo Barile Nicolia, Colle Cannuccio, Colle Cottorino, Colle Martuccio, Fontana Grande, Frosinone Stazione, La Cervona, La Pescara, Le Pignatelle, Le Rase, Madonna della Neve, Maniano, Pratillo, San Liberatore, Selva dei Muli, Valle Contessa, Vetiche I, Vetiche II

Government
  - Mayor: Riccardo Mastrangeli (FI)

Area
  - Total: 47 km^{2} (18 sq mi)
- Elevation: 291 m (955 ft)

Population (31 August 2021)
  - Total: 44,087
  - Density: 940/km^{2} (2,400/sq mi)
- Demonym: Frusinate(i)
- Time zone: UTC+1 (CET)
  - Summer (DST): UTC+2 (CEST)
- Postal code: 03100
- Dialing code: 0775
- Patron saint: Saints Silverius and Hormisdas
- Saint day: June 20
- Website: Official website

Frosinone (Italian: [froziˈnoːne]; local dialect: Frusenone) is a comune (municipality) in the Italian region of Lazio, administrative seat of the province of Frosinone. It is about 75 kilometres (47 mi) southeast of Rome, close to the Rome-Naples A1 Motorway. The city is the main city of the Valle Latina ("Latin Valley"), an Italian geographical and historical region that extends from south of Rome to Cassino.

Until the 19th century, it was a village with a rural vocation, while from the 20th century, it became an important industrial and commercial centre. Traditionally considered a Volscian city, with the name of Frusna and then the Roman of Latium adiectum as Frùsino, over the course of its millenary history it has been subjected to multiple devastations caused by its geostrategic position. As a consequence of this, as well as of destruction due to seismic events (the most ruinous of which occurred in September 1349), it retains only rare, albeit significant, traces of its past.

== Etymology ==
Frusĭno (this is the Latin name) was at the time inhabited by the people of the Volsci, albeit included in the territory of the Hernici. The Volscian name of the city would be Frusna or Fruscìno, whose etymology is controversial; however, various hypotheses have been tried: the first would make the name derive from the Greek root (portis: heifer); a second, observing the assonance with Etruscan roots, links the name to a hypothetical Etruscan gens Fursina (or alternatively, Frusina or Prusina).

These have been accompanied by a more recent hypothesis, which, based on the links between the pre-Roman Italic civilizations, and in particular the Etruscan one, with the Akkadian-Sumerian peoples, posits similar influences also for toponyms: according to this, Frusna would have the meaning of "Land sprinkled by rivers".

== History ==
=== Ancient age ===
The first traces of human presence around modern Frosinone date from the Lower Paleolithic (around 250,000 years ago). The earliest settlements in the area are from around 4,000 years ago, including late Bronze Age remains in what is now the upper part of the city (12th–10th century BC) and 7th–6th century BC sepultures. 21 tombs from a Volscan necropolis were found in the Frosinone centre.

The city was founded in the territory of Hernicians by the Volsci in the 6th century BC with the name of Fruscìno or Frusna, as a strategic outpost in front of the impregnable fortress of Aletrium (today known as Alatri).

It was subjugated by the Romans in 386 BC during their advance against the Volsci in Valle del Sacco, then transformed into a municipium under the Roman garrison. The taking of the urban centre of Frosinone, which then as today is located in the centre of the Sacco Valley, determined an important strategic victory for the Romans, who with this city could easily control all transits and commercial traffic between the north and the south of the peninsula.

In 306 BC, the city took part in the Hernic League against Rome; defeated and sacked, it lost much of its territories to the nearby Ferentino. Later, during the Second Punic War, it was devastated by Hannibal's armies, to which it refused to surrender. This event earned it the appellative, given by Silius Italicus, of Bellator Frusino, which still stands out in the city coat of arms:

Fert concitus inde per iuga celsa gradum, duris qua rupibus haeret, bellator Frusino

— Punica XII, 39

.

Silio Italico also praises Frusino during the listing of the Roman allies in the Battle of Canne ("a duro Frusino haud imbellis aratro", VIII, p. 398). Even Greek writers cited it in their writings, while among the Romans, later, Decimo Giunio Giovenale highlighted the tranquillity of the city.

Many ancient writers, including Tito Livio, Cassio Dione, Silio Italico, Festo Pomponio, Floro, the aforementioned Juvenal, and Marco Tullio Cicerone (Cicero) note the city of Frusino not only for mere historical facts, but also for the virtues of its inhabitants. Cicero himself in the territory of Frosinone owned a villa or a property, as it is possible to guess from a letter sent to his friend Atticus.

Despite the political and military troubles, Frusino was a prefecture and a municipality with all the rights that Roman citizenship entailed. The city obtained citizenship rights and became a colony in Roman imperial times, when part of its lands was assigned to Roman legionaries. As some historians report, the walls were built to defend the city. It was embellished with buildings, monuments and statues, which wars, the passing of time, and the neglect or foolishness of men have ruined, although in recent decades numerous artefacts have been found preserved in various museums, for example, the famous statue of Mars located in Rome, at Villa Albani, which was found in 1744 in the area that is still called Colle Marte today.

The sources are obscure on the spread of Christianity in Frosinone, but it is believed that an ancient diocese existed; the city was the birthplace of two popes, Pope Ormisda and Pope Silverio (the only case of two popes father and son), today patrons of the city.

=== Medieval age ===
After the fall of the Western Roman Empire, Frosinone was destroyed several times by foreign invaders; in the early Middle Ages it was an agricultural centre of the Duchy of Rome. In the 13th century, it became the capital of a duchy assigned to the Gaetani, and from that century it was occasionally the seat of the rector of Campagna and Marittima, together with other cities of the papal province such as Ferentino, Anagni and Priverno. In 1350, it was damaged by an earthquake.

At the beginning of the 14th century, the city was dominated by the nearby and powerful Alatri, in turn, conquered by Francesco de Ceccano and his Ceccanesi troops for thirty years.

=== Modern age ===
In the 16th century it was devastated by the Landsknecht, who brought the plague there, immediately followed by French and Florentine troops, at the same time as the Sack of Rome. The fortress, destroyed, was rebuilt; whose main entrance portal would have been designed by Michelangelo.

New destruction occurred with the occupation by the Spanish troops at war against Pope Paul IV in 1556: its fortress was strategically important for the control of the whole Sacco valley and for the defence of Rome. Following the treaty of Cave (1557) the residence of the pontifical governors of the province of Campagna and Marittima was definitively fixed in Frosinone; the Campagna e Marittima will then take the name of the Apostolic Delegation of Frosinone.

Frosinone steadily expanded its population in modern times, passing from around 2,000 people in the mid-17th century to the over 10,000 it had at the Unification of Italy (late 19th century). At the same time a new architectural and urban development began, with the construction or renovation of monuments and places of worship, and in the nineteenth century the construction of new important roads, on all the Via Nova (current Corso della Repubblica) and Viale Roma, new access to the city.

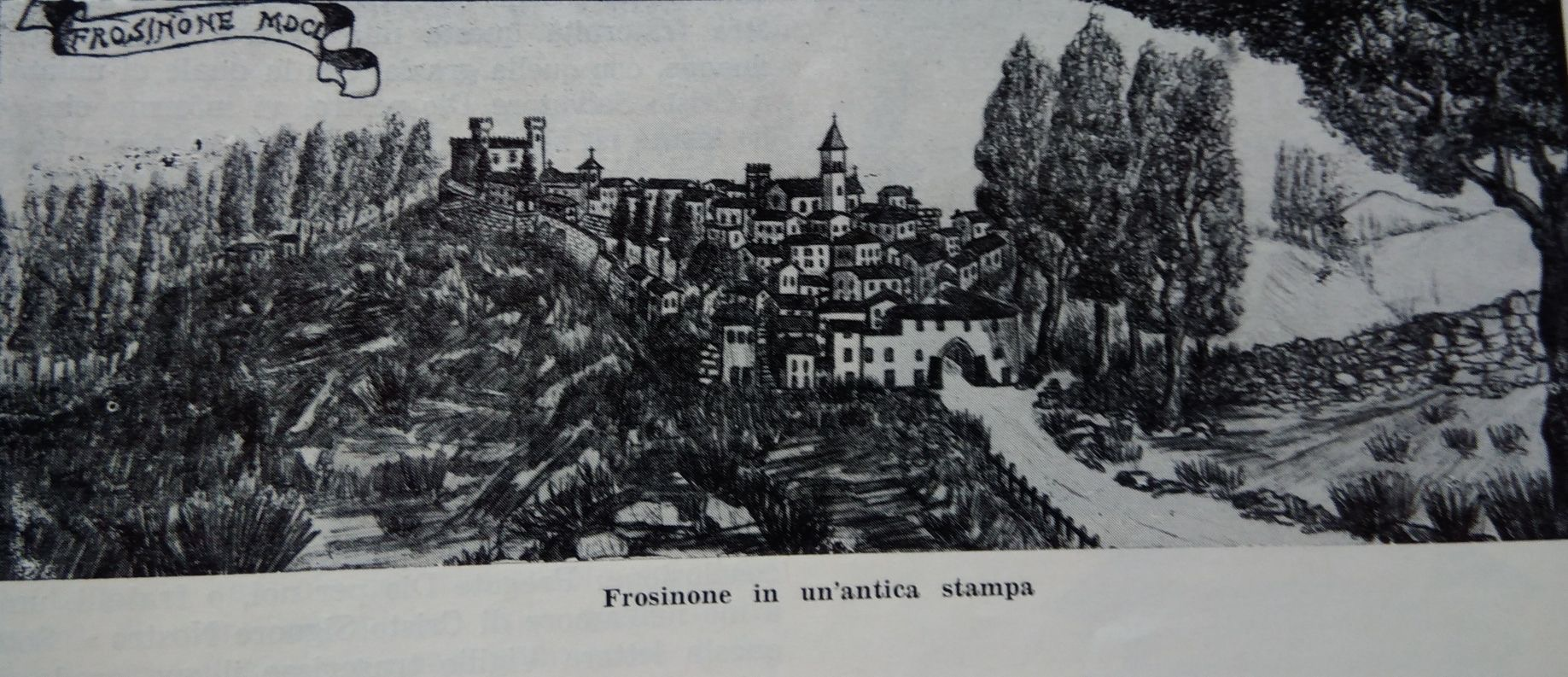
Antique print depicting the city in the 17th century

Worthy of note was the attitude of the Frosinone population during the French occupation and the Roman Republic, to which two Frosinone people, Giuseppe De Matthaeis and Luigi Angeloni, who became Tribunes of the Republic adhered: the population, around 1798, rebelled against the French troops and for this reason, the city was put to fire and sword and sacked (the anti-French revolt still echoes today through the Festa della Radeca, the Frosinone Carnival).

=== Contemporary age ===
On the occasion of the journey of Pius IX in the province of Campagna and Marittima (13–20 May 1863) by train, solemn celebrations were organized, which ended with the blessing of the pope from the balcony of the Prefecture. During this visit, the pope promised extraordinary funding for the construction of an aqueduct intended to bring running water to the city by means of a hydraulic pump, an aqueduct completed and inaugurated on December 8, 1869.

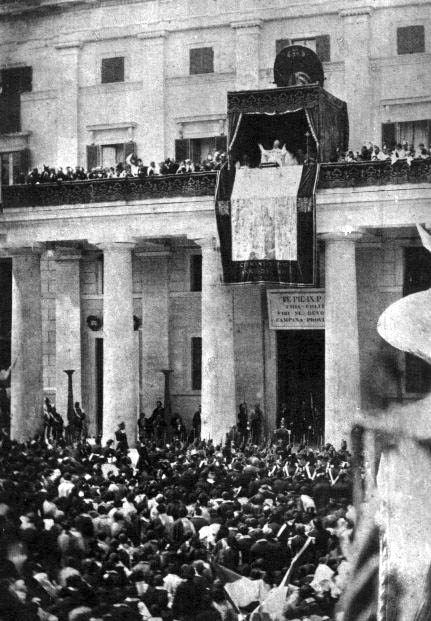
Pope Pius IX visiting Frosinone, May 14, 1863

Frosinone witnessed in 1867 the Agro Romano Campaign for the liberation of Rome with the Nicotera Column. The clash with the Garibaldini in Monte San Giovanni Campano, on the border with the Kingdom of Italy, is noteworthy. The relics of the "Nicola Ricciotti" Carbonara Sale, a patriot of Frosinone, are kept in the National Museum of Mentana.

Frosinone was removed from the Papal State and officially annexed to the Kingdom of Italy on September 17, 1870, three days before Porta Pia. In reality, the secular papal dominion over the city had in fact already ended on the evening of 12 September with the escape of the last apostolic delegate, Monsignor Pietro Lasagni, while the Italian troops were still along the Casilina, in the territory of Ripi, in waiting to resume the march towards Frosinone.

In the second half of the nineteenth century, the inhabited area of the city was almost entirely enclosed within the ancient walls of the medieval "citadel", as it had been rebuilt several times after the various devastations suffered by German and Spanish armies in the 16th century and by the French at the end of the 18th century. According to the description of the local historian Vittorio Valle, the citadel "was bounded by a wall that had three cornerstones, the Porta Romana or della Valle, the Porta di Campania or Napoletana (today Porta Campagiorni) and the Rocca, now the venue of the Prefecture."

After national unification, the city, which became the capital of the district of Frosinone in the province of Rome, underwent a building renovation and architectural embellishment of the town, as evidenced by the late nineteenth-century and Umbertine buildings of the current historic centre. The city became the seat of the offices of the sub-prefecture and the military district; from 1863 it was served by the state railway station, to which the local railway station (the Rome-Fiuggi-Alatri-Frosinone railway) was added.

In 1871 Domenico Diamanti became the first mayor of the city after the unification of Italy; he actively engaged in the modernization and rehabilitation of the city, then known as one of the most backward in Italy. He took care of the building renovation, the arrangement of the streets, the squares and the lighting of the urban centre. In 1874 a row of buildings of over 300 meters was built, known as the "Berardi palace", intended to meet the housing needs of the newborn State for employees and soldiers. At the centre of the structure rose the Isabella Theater, which was later called Politeama and then Cinema-Teatro Excelsior, still present today although inactive.

In June 1873 Urbano Rattazzi, then President of the Council of Ministers, died suddenly in Frosinone while he was staying with a friend. For that occasion, numerous politicians and officials of the King arrived in the city. The villa where Rattazzi died, Casale Ricci in via Armando Fabi, is now completely abandoned.

At the time of the First World War, Frosinone had about 12,000 inhabitants, scattered throughout the countryside in hamlets, small villages, or scattered houses, mainly devoted to agriculture. A smaller part of the inhabitants resided in the historic centre employed in the various offices of the sub-prefecture, the Municipality and other administrations including the Military District. There was also a fair amount of artisanal and commercial activity. On the other hand, industrial activity was more modest, with the presence of mills along the river Cosa, pasta factories and printers.

Frosinone remained the seat of the sub-prefecture from 1871 to 1926. In 1927, as part of a general administrative reorganization, the province of Frosinone was established by the fascist regime, subtracting municipalities from the provinces of Rome and Terra di Lavoro. The existing offices were expanded and new ones were created and a large number of state employees were transferred to the city, especially from Caserta.

Frosinone, therefore, experienced a new demographic, economic and social development. In this period, numerous new public buildings were also built, including the Palace of the Province and that of the Chamber of Commerce. In 1924 the Monument to the Fallen of the First World War was inaugurated in the presence of King Vittorio Emanuele III, the work of the architect Cesare Bazzani.

=== Frosinone during the Second World War ===
The latest destruction would be inflicted on the city during the Second World War, with 56 Anglo-American bombings which lasted from 11 September 1943 to the end of May 1944. During that unfortunate period, all public offices were temporarily moved a little further up north, to Fiuggi, which enjoyed relative tranquillity. It was 31 May 1944 when the first Allied soldiers entered Frosinone (Canadian soldiers belonging to the Loyal Edmonton Regiment), who sent a message to the command: "The city is empty and in ruins!"

The bombings razed 80% of the city to the ground, including the Church of the Annunziata, the Berardi Palace, the Town Hall, the entire medieval village which was developed in the area of Via Cavour, the barracks of the R.R. Carabinieri, the final stretch of Via Vittorio Emanuele II, now Corso della Repubblica. Significant damage was reported at the Apostolic Palace, now the seat of the Prefecture, at the Cathedral of Santa Maria Assunta, at the seat of the "N.Turriziani" Liceo Classico and at the Church of Santa Lucia. Downstream, the railway station and the Sanctuary of the Madonna delle Nevi were destroyed.

The bell tower, a symbol of the city and on which a siren had been placed to warn citizens in case of enemy air raids, reported a large circular hole on one of the clocks.

Furthermore, the monument to the fallen of the Great War located in Piazza Armando Diaz, of which only the pedestal remained, was completely lost. This was then reused for the new monument to the fallen, of all wars, in Frosinone, built by Umberto Mastroianni at the end of the seventies and which is now located in one of the "corners" of Viale Mazzini.

At the end of the war, Frosinone was the most devastated provincial capital in relation to the number of inhabitants and the building stock. A census of the following year recorded 3,050 rooms completely destroyed, 4,880 badly damaged, 8,500 people were left homeless, practically all the inhabitants of the upper part of Frosinone. Hundreds were dead and wounded. But despite the extreme suffering and devastation, the municipality would only receive a bronze medal for Civil Valor.

=== From the postwar period to today ===
The reconstruction provided an opportunity to transform the production system, which transitioned from mainly agricultural to mainly industrial, and then to a mainly tertiary economy (including activities such as trade, services and public administration).

Specifically, between 1950 and 1960, Frosinone saw a continuation of the trends it had seen in the immediate postwar period: a steady decline in the agricultural sector (to 9% of employed residents), a modest increase in industry (to 36%) and a significant rise in tertiary activities, in which 54% of the workforce is engaged.

The reconstruction work continues, including: renovations to important buildings (such as the sites of the Prefecture, the Bank of Italy, the halls of Justice, the Chamber of Commerce and the Post and Telecommunications); new construction (such as the Civil Hospital, public housing and the Edera skyscraper); the expansion of the urban and extra-urban road network; and providing public water connections to nearby rural settlements.

It was within this general framework that the industrialization process began. In 1962, the Industrialization Unit of the Sacco Valley was established and the Rome-Naples motorway section was constructed. The motorway artery, which crosses the entire valley longitudinally, was hugely important in ending the isolation of the capital and of the entire province. Previously the region had only the ancient Via Casilina and less functional roadways for inter-regional connections, and the Rome-Naples railway had not yet been electrified.

The following decades saw economic development, but also periods of crisis. This led, especially in the lower Frosinone, to the development of an industrial and commercial centre that was predominantly modern, but suffered from a disordered and irrational approach to urban development, caused by a failure to implement the zoning plan and a tendency to engage in building speculation – this tendency has been increasing since the 1960s and continues today, even though the population stopped growing many years ago.

== Geography ==
Frosinone is in Latium and is the main city of the Valle Latina ("Latin Valley"). The town is surrounded by the Ernici and Lepini mountain ranges.

== Climate ==
According to the Köppen climate classification, Frosinone experiences either a mid-latitude humid subtropical climate (Cfa) or a hot-summer Mediterranean climate (Csa), depending on the variety of classification used.

Climate data for Frosinone (1991–2020, extremes 1961–present)
Month	Jan	Feb	Mar	Apr	May	Jun	Jul	Aug	Sep	Oct	Nov	Dec	Year
Record high °C (°F)	19.5 (67.1)	21.6 (70.9)	26.8 (80.2)	29.8 (85.6)	34.0 (93.2)	38.4 (101.1)	39.4 (102.9)	42.8 (109.0)	38.2 (100.8)	32.4 (90.3)	25.0 (77.0)	21.8 (71.2)	42.8 (109.0)
Mean daily maximum °C (°F)	11.4 (52.5)	12.7 (54.9)	15.8 (60.4)	19.2 (66.6)	23.9 (75.0)	28.4 (83.1)	31.6 (88.9)	32.4 (90.3)	26.9 (80.4)	21.7 (71.1)	16.0 (60.8)	12.1 (53.8)	21.0 (69.8)
Daily mean °C (°F)	6.1 (43.0)	7.0 (44.6)	9.9 (49.8)	13.0 (55.4)	17.4 (63.3)	21.7 (71.1)	24.5 (76.1)	25.0 (77.0)	20.5 (68.9)	16.0 (60.8)	11.0 (51.8)	7.0 (44.6)	14.9 (58.8)
Mean daily minimum °C (°F)	1.1 (34.0)	1.6 (34.9)	4.1 (39.4)	6.8 (44.2)	10.8 (51.4)	14.8 (58.6)	17.5 (63.5)	17.8 (64.0)	14.1 (57.4)	10.3 (50.5)	6.1 (43.0)	2.0 (35.6)	8.9 (48.0)
Record low °C (°F)	−19.0 (−2.2)	−13.0 (8.6)	−7.6 (18.3)	−2.8 (27.0)	0.0 (32.0)	3.4 (38.1)	8.7 (47.7)	8.0 (46.4)	4.7 (40.5)	−0.4 (31.3)	−7.2 (19.0)	−8.0 (17.6)	−19.0 (−2.2)
Average precipitation mm (inches)	92.8 (3.65)	91.6 (3.61)	101.4 (3.99)	94.2 (3.71)	77.9 (3.07)	50.9 (2.00)	46.5 (1.83)	34.3 (1.35)	98.0 (3.86)	136.4 (5.37)	183.9 (7.24)	153.4 (6.04)	1,161.2 (45.72)
Average precipitation days (≥ 1.0 mm)	8.6	8.2	8.0	9.6	8.2	5.4	4.2	4.1	7.4	8.0	11.4	9.9	93.1
Average relative humidity (%)	74.5	70.4	69.2	69.6	68.9	67.2	65.1	64.4	68.8	73.8	77.6	75.9	70.5
Average dew point °C (°F)	2.2 (36.0)	2.1 (35.8)	4.5 (40.1)	7.7 (45.9)	11.6 (52.9)	14.8 (58.6)	16.7 (62.1)	17.0 (62.6)	14.4 (57.9)	11.7 (53.1)	7.9 (46.2)	3.4 (38.1)	9.5 (49.1)
Source 1: NOAA
Source 2: Servizio Meteorologico (extremes)

== Cityscape ==
=== Cathedral of Santa Maria Assunta ===
The Cathedral of Santa Maria Assunta is the most important church in Frosinone and is located on the highest point of the hill on which the historic center of the city stands (Upper Frosinone). It was extensively remodeled in the 18th century, referring to Sant'Andrea della Valle in Rome.

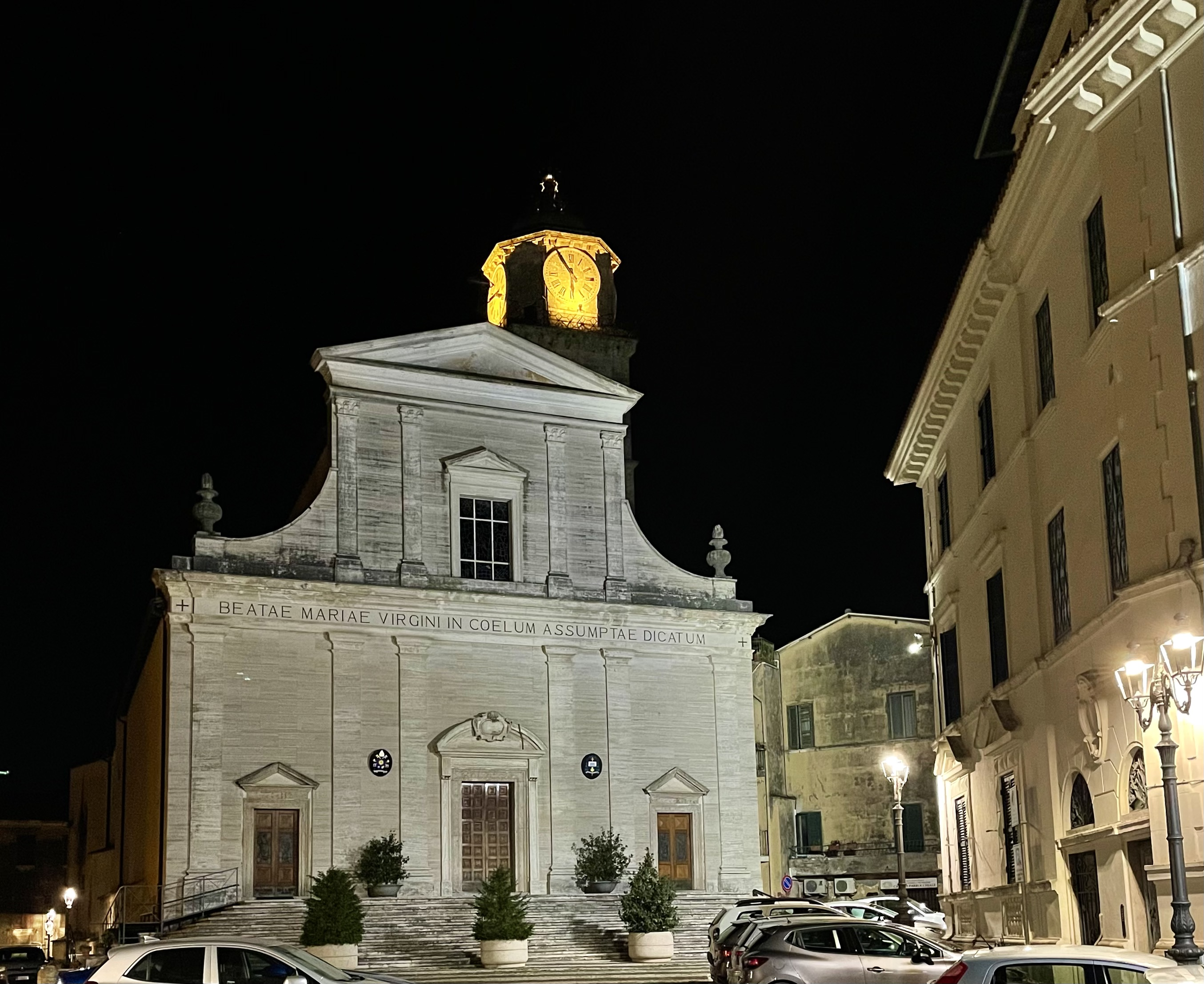
The Cathedral of Frosinone, dedicated to Santa Maria Assunta

It features a bell tower (Il Campanile), 68 meters high, which is considered the most emblematic monument of the city, with three rows of mullioned windows. The facade of the cathedral is in white marble.

Among the works of art preserved in the sacred place there is a "Madonna with Sant'Anna, San Giovannino and angels" by Sementi. The church has been a Cathedral since 1986, the year the diocese was established.

==== Chiesa abbaziale di San Benedetto ====
Built in 1134, the abbey church of San Benedetto which is also the oldest art gallery in the city, was rebuilt between 1750 and 1797 in late Baroque style, with an octagonal lantern and a facade with two superimposed orders. remained unscathed from war destruction, it preserves inside valuable canvases dated between the seventeenth century and the nineteenth century.

The interior of the church has a single nave, with intercommunicating side chapels, covered with a ribbed barrel vault, stuccoed and lunette at each window.

Inside the church there is the painting of the "Madonna del Buon Consiglio" by an unknown local artist, to which a miracle is linked that would have occurred on 10 July 1796: while some women were gathered for the rosary in front of the painting "the Madonna opened her eyes and looked at the faithful, then her face became vermilion.Sometimes the left eye that looked at the Child was veiled with tears".

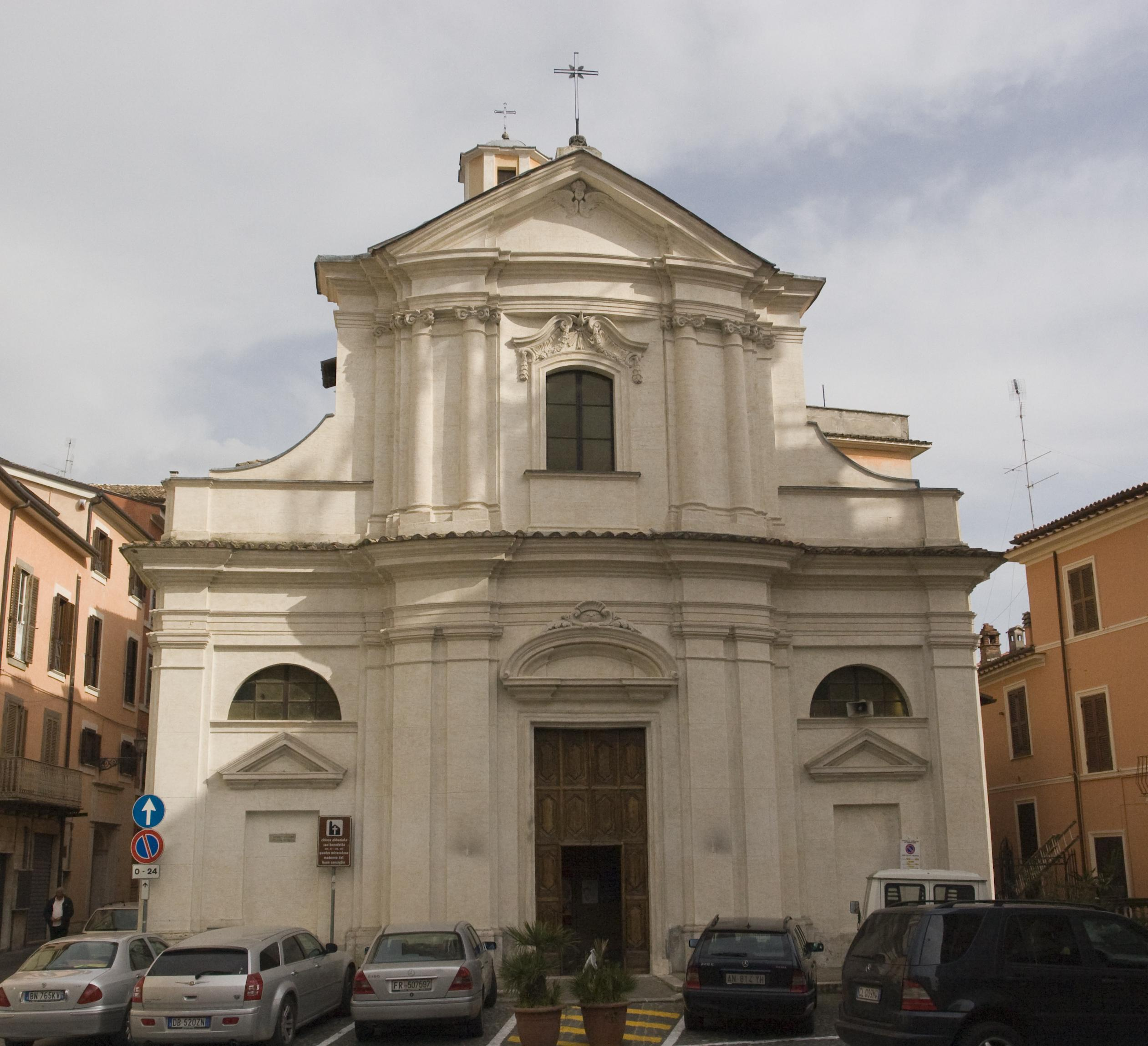
The church of San Benedetto, in the historic center of the city

Among the other canvases present, the one dedicated to San Gregorio Magno stands out, made by the local painter Mascetti in 1899, copying a fresco by the painter Filippo Gagliardi. The altar, adorned with Baroque stuccoes, is dedicated to the Kambo family. Under the altar the remains of a martyr of Christianity are kept and visible.

Going up the small bell tower you can admire two bells of the ancient eighteenth-century Cacciavillani factory and the bell, also eighteenth-century, of the ancient municipal seat, now a post office with the ancient coat of arms of the city of Frosinone.

==== Sanctuary of the Madonna della Neve ====
The sanctuary of the Madonna della Neve was built as a rural chapel at the end of the seventeenth century in the place of a miraculous event, which took place on May 10, 1675, and known as the "Sweating of the Madonna" which would have occurred in the already existing church dating back to 1586. In just over a year the church was completed in all its parts, including the sacristy and bell tower, and all the sacred furnishings were provided.

On 8 May 1678, the fourth Sunday after Easter, she was solemnly consecrated. The Sanctuary later hosted a community of religious. When the prodigy of sweating occurred in 1675, the very young Cardinal Francesco Orsini, future Pope Benedict XIII, at the time archbishop of Benevento, also intervened among the illustrious pilgrims who came to venerate the image assisted. In 1727, now elected Pope, he wanted to return to Frosinone on the eve of the Ascension to venerate the Madonna della Neve, still today there is a plaque commemorating her visit. Pius IX also visited the Sanctuary on May 14, 1863, and also in this circumstance the feast of the Ascension took place.

In the church, a 16th century fresco depicts the Madonna della Neve with saints Ormisda and Silverio. Then there is an altarpiece by Filippo Balbi depicting the Madonna della Cintura.

The original church was sacked several times in the course of history and also suffered serious damage during the air raids to the point of being demolished and rebuilt in the fifties.

==== Church of San Magno or of the Madonna della Delibera ====
The Church of San Magno, or of the Madonna della Delibera, dates back to the 9th century, but its current appearance is partly due to the restoration in 1747. With an octagonal plan, inside it houses frescoes depicting the Virgin Mary, the Child and Saint Magno adoring, Saint Thomas Aquinas and Saint Biagio, Saint Bernardino of Siena and Saint Luigi Gonzaga.

Noteworthy is the frescoed altarpiece depicting Saint Magno with Saint Ormisda. Between the two saints, the unknown author of the work depicted the city of Frosinone, with the Rocca and the towers present at the time.

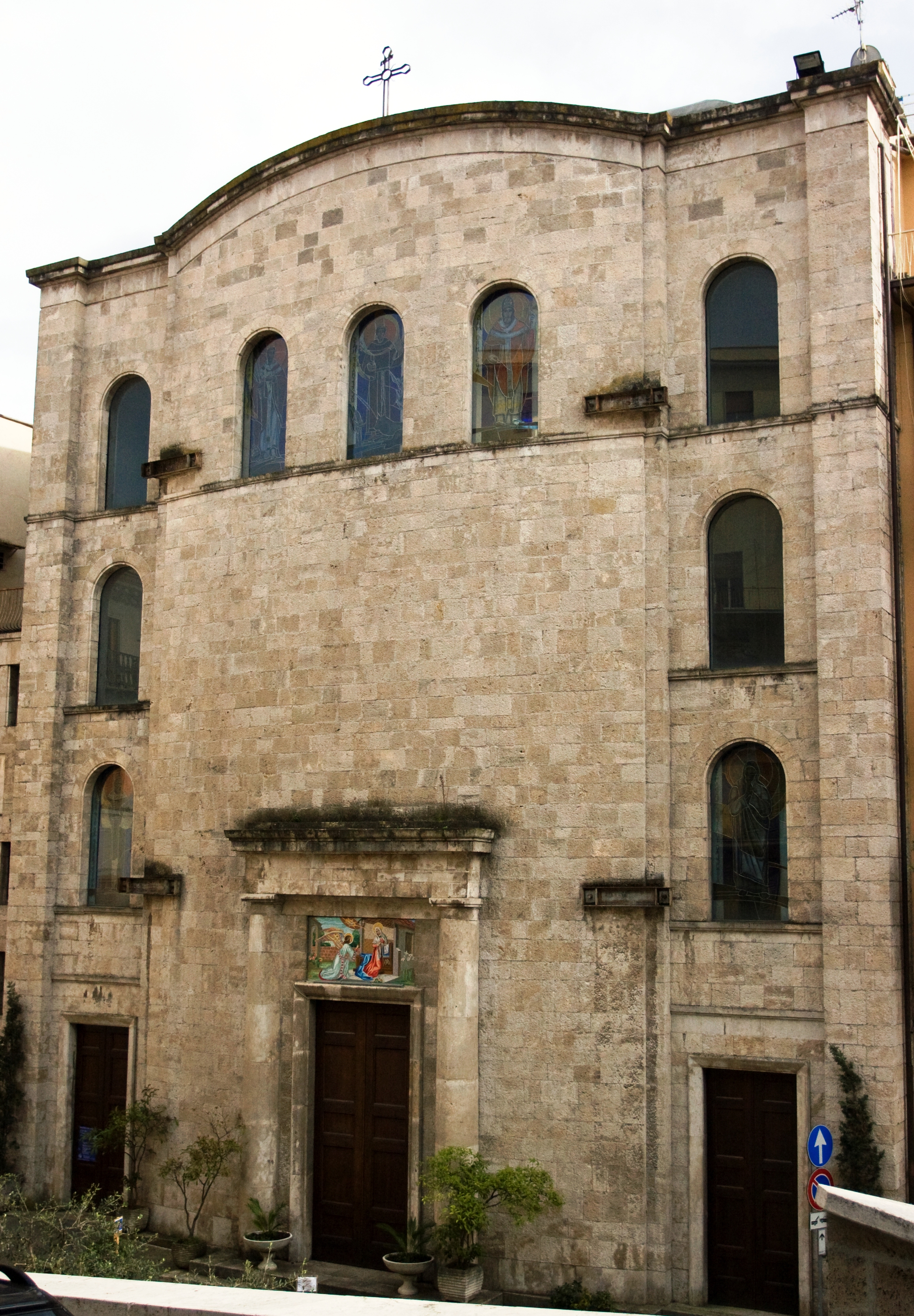
the church of the Santissima Annunziata

==== Church of the Santissima Annunziata ====
The Church of the Santissima Annunziata, seat since 1785 of one of the parishes of the city, was destroyed by the bombings of the Second World War, and therefore rebuilt in the 1950s. In 1984 it suffered extensive damage following an earthquake, returning usable only in 2000.

==== Church of Santa Lucia ====
A church with this name was built in the 16th century at the behest of Bishop Ennio Filonardi, for the burial of those sentenced to death, in the place where the Bank of Italy building would later rise. In 1840 it was rebuilt on the current Corso della Repubblica in neoclassical forms. Fallen into poverty at the end of the nineteenth century, it survived the bombings of 1943, when it is estimated that 95% of the buildings in that area had been destroyed.

==== Church of Santa Maria delle Grazie or San Gerardo ====
The church of Santa Maria delle Grazie was erected during the eighteenth century at the behest of the bishops of Veroli De Zaulis and De Tartagnis in the place where there was a small cone of the same name and the church of San Lorenzo. The church, with a single nave, has various side chapels and a precious 14th century fresco, placed behind the central altar, depicting the Madonna nursing the Child, a typical image of popular devotion as well as the only fragment of the ancient building of San Lorenzo.

In June 1776 the custody of the church was entrusted to the Redemptorist fathers and the devotion to San Gerardo Maiella was associated with the cult of the Madonna delle Grazie. The feast of the saint, the last Sunday of September, attracts thousands of faithful every year. San Clemente Maria Hofbauer lived for some time in the annexed religious house founded by Sant'Alfonso and celebrated his first Holy Mass in this church.

It is still officiated today by the Redemptorist fathers who have their own home in this sanctuary.

=== Civil architectures ===
==== Government Palace ====
Located in the place where the medieval fortress of Frosinone stood, the building currently the seat of the prefecture of Frosinone was built starting from 1825 as the seat of the Apostolic Delegation of Frosinone on a project by the architect Mazzarini and the works, carried out by the architect Antonio Sarti, ended in 1840. Of the fortress he kept the portal, the design of which was attributed by oral tradition to Michelangelo.

The building was damaged by the Marsica earthquake of 1915, by a fire in 1927 and above all by the bombings of the Second World War.

After the war it acquired its current appearance, essentially maintaining the overall structure, with four floors and a central loggia at the height of the noble floor supported by six Doric columns, but deprived of the clock tower that crowned it. Inside there are furnishings from the Royal Palace of Caserta.

==== Palazzo della Provincia ====
The building, seat of the provincial administration of Frosinone, was built between 1930 and 1933 in the neoclassical style – but with a reinforced concrete structure – based on a project by the architect Giovanni Jacobucci. According to the intentions, the inauguration of the Palace should have taken place on October 28, 1932, on the occasion of the tenth anniversary of the march on Rome, but the works were completed the following year.

In the atrium of the building there is the bronze statue of the Dancer: this early twentieth century work by Amleto Cataldi – a sculptor originally from Roccasecca and Castrocielo whose production mainly developed in Rome – has been brought back to Italy from the United States, where it had been since the 1920s, In 2010. Auguste Rodin was able to admire the sculpture in an exhibition in Paris and underlined "the rhythmic harmony and active silence".

From the atrium, a monumental staircase leads to the upper floors and the reception hall. The palace also houses works of art by Umberto Mastroianni, Renato Guttuso, Cavalier d'Arpino, Aldo Turkeyro and Giovanni Colacicchi.

==== Palazzo Pietro Tiravanti ====
This imposing building was built as the seat of elementary schools, based on a project by engineer Edgardo Vivoli, "on the verdant spur of the Belvedere hill in view of the delightful plain" and was dedicated to the gold medal Pietro Tiravanti, who fell in Libya during the First World War. Of classical architecture, it was one of the first buildings in Italy of this size to be built in anti-seismic reinforced concrete.

the work, conceived since 1871, was made possible thanks to the funding received following the Marsica earthquake of 1915: begun in January 1925, it saw its completion on June 15, 1929.

The building is spread over 4 floors in the side forepart and 3 floors in the central part, with 52 rooms, 14 corridors and 2 stairwells; due to its size, which makes it unmistakable in the city landscape, the Tiravanti is also known in the city as the "Building". A conservative restoration project for the building, commissioned by the municipal administration, was financed by the Monte dei Paschi di Siena Foundation.

On 6 December 2014 it became the seat of the Frosinone Academy of Fine Arts, following a restoration funded by Banca Popolare del Cassinate. On 1 March 2015, the Maca, the Museum of Contemporary Art of the Academy of Fine Arts, opens inside.

== Archaeological sites ==
=== Roman amphitheater ===
The ruins of a Roman amphitheater, built between the end of the 1st century and the beginning of the 2nd century, are at the foot of the hill on which the historic center of the city stands today, near the Cosa river. The hypothesis that there was an amphitheater in Frosinone had been formulated in the early nineteenth century by Giuseppe De Matthaeis, who in one of his historical essays dedicated to the city cites some medieval documents in which expressions such as "juxta amphitheatrum Frusinonis" and "cum amphitheatrum", but the exact site was identified only in 1965, during the excavation sites for the construction of some buildings, which were eventually built on top of it anyway. The part of the Roman monument left visible between the pillars of the building above can be visited today. A reconstructive model of the monument is on display in the Archaeological Museum of Frosinone.

The building, with an elliptical plan, had the main entrances to the arena at the ends of its major axis of about 80 m, which is presumed to have had a single order of steps, eventually holding about 2000 spectators. In the vicinity of this archaeological site it is possible to visit the locality Ponte della Fontana where you can admire the ancient bridge and the fountain from which the name of the area derives. Next to the ancient bridge of the fountain there is a more modern bridge inaugurated in 1870, which still today provides access to one of the main roads leading to the upper part of the city.

== Culture ==
Frosinone Calcio is a professional football team which plays at the Stadio Benito Stirpe in Frosinone. The 2018–19 season was the team's second season in Serie A, the highest level of professional football in Italy.

== Government ==
=== Twin towns ===
- (United States) Elmwood Park (Illinois), since 1996: the twinning was born due to the strong presence of Ciociari immigrants in the American town.
- (Canada) Tecumseh, since 2009: the initiative was born from the proclamation, by the Ciociaro Club of Windsor, of the city of Frosinone as "Municipality of the Year 2009". Tecumseh, a town bordering Windsor, recognized the important role Italians played in their own development. In particular, it was recognized what was done by the Frosinone immigrants who have given, since their arrival, a strong contribution to the construction of the productive-economic apparatus, both in manufacturing and in agricultural production.
- (Italy) Nocera Umbra, since 2009: the twinning was born following the tragic events of September 1997, when the city of Nocera Umbra was hit by the earthquake. A team of Fire Brigade from Frosinone brought first aid, in particular, in Colle di Nocera. Subsequently, the Colle Cottorino Committee of Frosinone, made contact with the Pro Loco of Nocera Umbra, decided to bring a small gift to each of the 110 children of the elementary schools of Colle di Nocera Umbra. Since then a close bond of friendship and solidarity has been established between the two communities and the initial twinning between the two hamlets has extended to the municipal level.
- (Italy) Ponza, since 2010: the twinning was born from the common veneration for the patron saint.
