= List of caves in Italy =

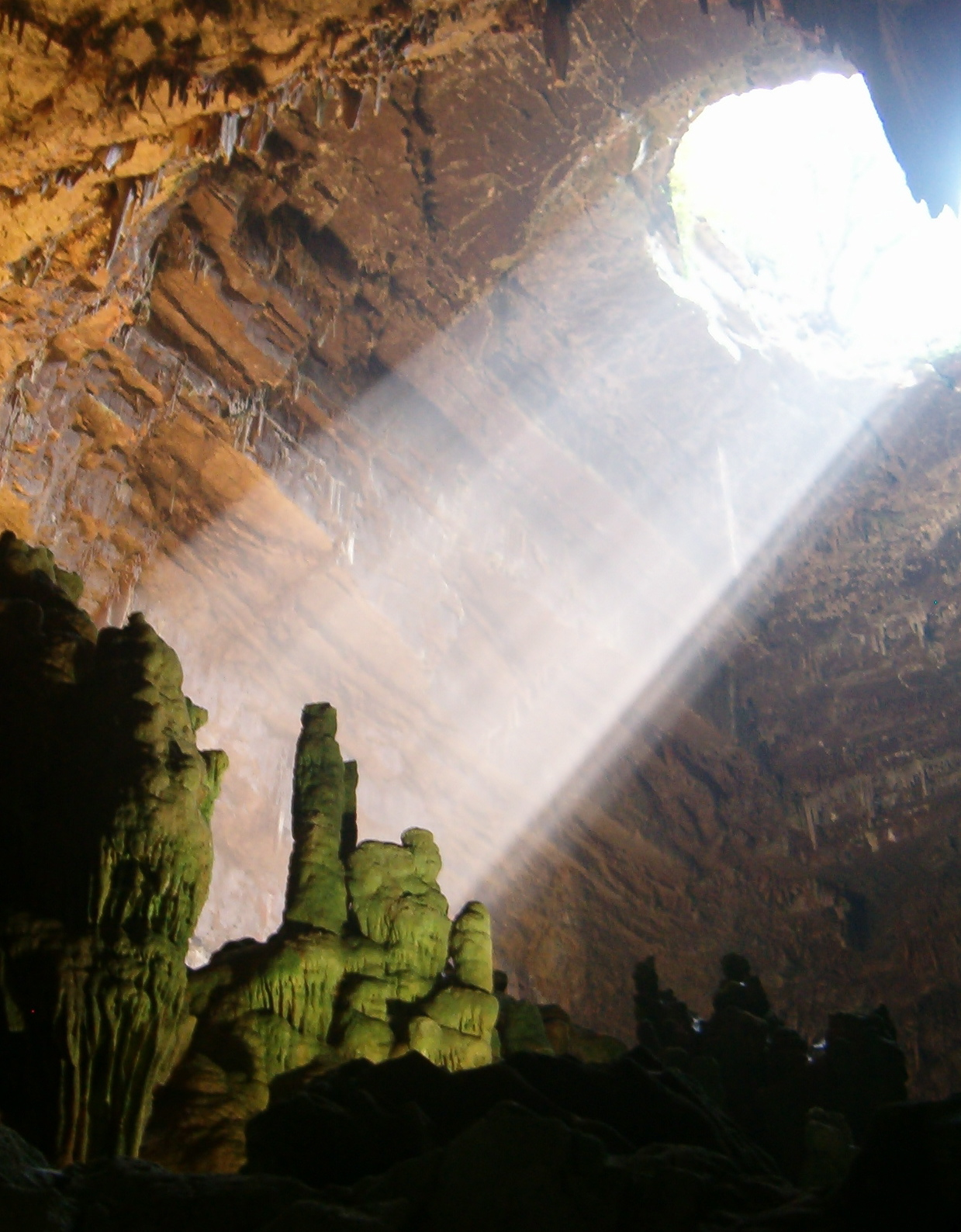
View of Castellana Caves

The following article shows a list of caves in Italy.

== Overview ==
Main concentration of Italian caves (Italian: grotte, singular: grotta) is close to the Alps and the Apennine Mountains, principally due to karst. The Italian caves attract around 1.5 million tourists every year.

The main Italian tourist caves are Castellana Caves and Frasassi Caves. Other notable show caves are Stiffe Caves, Borgio Verezzi Caves, Castelcivita Caves, Grotta del Cavallone, Grotta Gigante, Grotta di Ispinigoli, Neptune's Grotto, Pastena Caves, Pertosa Caves, Grotta dello Smeraldo and Toirano Caves.

Other notable Italian caves are Grotto Calgeron, Ear of Dionysius, Grotta del Gelo, Paglicci Cave, Grotta dell'Addaura, Arene Candide, Fumane Cave, Nereo Cave, Blue Grotto and the Caves of Marina di Camerota.

== Caves ==
The caves are listed by alphabetical order and there are shown the main tourist caves and other notable (e.g. archaeological or paleontological) underground voids.

Image	Name	Municipality	Region	Length	Elevation	Coordinates
	Addaura	Palermo (PA)	Sicily	?	70 m (230 ft)	38°11′13″N 13°21′02″E
	Arene Candide	Finale Ligure (SV)	Liguria	?	90 m (300 ft)	44°9′42.48″N 8°19′35.04″E
	Antro del Corchia	Stazzema (LU)	Tuscany	?	600 m (2,000 ft)	44°00′00″N 10°19′00″E
	Artiglieria	Doberdò del Lago (GO)	Friuli-Venezia Giulia	95.9 m (315 ft)	187 m (614 ft)	45°49′56″N 13°34′18″E
	Balzi Rossi	Ventimiglia (IM)	Liguria	?	100 m (330 ft)	43°47′00″N 7°32′08″E
	Bigonda	Grigno (TN); Ospedalettop (TN)	Trentino-Alto Adige/Südtirol	458 m (1,503 ft)	458 m (1,503 ft)	46°01′03″N 11°34′57″E
	Blue Grotto	Anacapri (NA)	Campania	?	0 m (0 ft)	40°33′38″N 14°12′17″E
	Bonetti	Doberdò del Lago (GO)	Friuli-Venezia Giulia	87.5 m (287 ft)	186 m (610 ft)	45°50′00″N 13°34′50″E
	Borgio Verezzi	Borgio Verezzi (SV)	Liguria	?	200 m (660 ft)	44°9′35.26″N 8°18′19.16″E
	Bue Marino Grotto	Dorgali (NU)	Sardinia	?	0 m (0 ft)	40°17′00″N 09°38′00″E
	Abisso Bueno Fonteno	Fonteno (BG)	Lombardia	19 km (12 mi) (not fully explored)	−515 m (−1,690 ft) (not fully explored)	
	Calgeron	Grigno (TN)	Trentino-Alto Adige/Südtirol	?	400 m (1,300 ft)	46°01′00″N 11°38′00″E
	Castelcivita	Castelcivita (SA)	Campania	3 km (1.9 mi)	94 m (308 ft)	40°28′00″N 15°13′00″E
	Castellana	Castellana Grotte (BA)	Apulia	3 km (1.9 mi)	290 m (950 ft)	40°52′32″N 17°08′59″E
	Cavallo	Nardò (LE)	Apulia	?	15 m (49 ft)	40°9′18″N 17°57′36″E
	Cavallone	Lama dei Peligni (CH); Taranta Peligna (CH)	Abruzzo	1 km (0.62 mi)	1.3 km (0.81 mi)	42°01′00″N 14°10′00″E
	Ciolo	Gagliano del Capo (LE)	Apulia	190 m (620 ft)	26 m (85 ft)	39°50′24″N 18°22′48″E
	Corbeddu	Oliena (NU)	Sardinia	130 m (430 ft)	200 m (660 ft)	40°15′17″N 9°29′06″E
	Coreca	Coreca (CS)	Calabria	?	25 m (82 ft)	39°05′37″N 16°05′03″E
	Dogs	Naples (NA)	Campania	9 m (30 ft)	173 m (568 ft)	40°49′59″N 14°10′00″E
	Deer	Otranto (LE)	Apulia	1.5 km (0.93 mi)	20 m (66 ft)	40°04′58″N 18°29′06″E
	Duino	Duino (TS)	Friuli-Venezia Giulia	?	?	45°47′03″N 13°35′52″E
	Ear of Dionysius	Syracuse (SR)	Sicily	65 m (213 ft)	400 m (1,300 ft)	37°04′00″N 15°16′00″E
	Felci	Capri (NA)	Campania	?	200 m (660 ft)	40°32′50″N 14°13′58″E
	Frasassi	Genga (AN)	Marche	5 km (3.1 mi)	300 m (980 ft)	43°25′50″N 12°56′09″E
	Fumane Cave	Fumane (Province of Verona)	Veneto	?	250 m (820 ft)	45°35′30″N 10°54′18″E
	Gelo	Randazzo (CT)	Sicily	?	2 km (1.2 mi)	37°48′22″N 14°58′00″E
	Giant	Sgonico (TS)	Friuli-Venezia Giulia	280 m (920 ft)	265 m (869 ft)	40°19′12″N 09°36′01″E
	Giusti Cave	Monsummano Terme (PT)	Tuscany	200 m (660 ft)	570 m (1,870 ft)	43°52′00″N 10°49′57″E
	Ispinigoli	Dorgali (NU)	Sardinia	?	1.3 km (0.81 mi)	40°18′00″N 09°35′00″E
	Is Zuddas Cave	Santadi (CI)	Sardinia	?	0 m (0 ft)	39°03′36″N 08°25′49″E
	Lauro Cave	Alcara li Fusi (ME)	Sicily	?	1 km (0.62 mi)	38°01′00″N 14°42′00″E
	Maona Cave	Montecatini Terme (PT)	Tuscany	200 m (660 ft)	255 m (837 ft)	43°54′02″N 10°46′37″E
	Malga Fossetta	Enego (VI)	Veneto	1 km (0.62 mi)	1.762 km (1.095 mi)	45°59′35″N 11°32′59″E
	Matromania	Capri (NA)	Campania	27 m (89 ft)	?	40°32′57″N 14°15′07″E
	Neptune	Alghero (SS)	Sardinia	?	5 m (16 ft)	40°33′39″N 08°09′50″E
	Nereo	Alghero (SS)	Sardinia	?	0 m (0 ft)	40°33′39″N 08°09′50″E
	Paglicci	Rignano Garganico (FG)	Apulia	?	590 m (1,940 ft)	41°40′00″N 15°34′00″E
	Pastena	Pastena (FR)	Lazio	?	310 m (1,020 ft)	41°30′00″N 13°28′00″E
	Patone Cave	Arco (TN)	Trentino-Alto Adige/Südtirol	?	300 m (980 ft)	45°55′00″N 10°52′00″E
	Pertosa	Pertosa (SA)	Campania	3 km (1.9 mi)	263 m (863 ft)	40°33′00″N 15°28′00″E
	Regina del Carso	Savogna d'Isonzo (GO)	Friuli-Venezia Giulia	320 m (1,050 ft)	194 m (636 ft)	45°52′54″N 13°34′02″E
	Romito	Papasidero (CS)	Calabria	54 m (177 ft)	296 m (971 ft)	39°54′40″N 15°55′45″E
	San Giovanni Cave	Domusnovas (CI)	Sardinia	2 km (1.2 mi)	150 m (490 ft)	39°20′13″N 08°37′40″E
	Sant'Angelo Caves	Cassano all'Ionio (CS)	Calabria	2.3 km (1.4 mi)	260 m (850 ft)	39°47′15.76″N 16°18′34.79″E
	Santa Croce	Bisceglie (BT)	Apulia	100 m (330 ft)	113 m (371 ft)	41°10′37″N 16°28′08″E
	Scurati	Custonaci (TP)	Sicily	70 m (230 ft)	60 m (200 ft)	38°05′35″N 12°40′15″E
	Sibyl's Cave	Montemonaco (AP)	Marche	?	2,150 m (7,050 ft)	42°54′00″N 13°15′56″E
	Smeraldo	Conca dei Marini (SA)	Campania	?	0 m (0 ft)	40°36′54″N 14°34′01″E
	Stiffe Caves	San Demetrio ne' Vestini (AQ)	Abruzzo	?	696 m (2,283 ft)	42°15′20.62″N 13°32′32.51″E
	Su Mannau Cave	Fluminimaggiore (CI)	Sardinia	?	256 m (840 ft)	39°26′00″N 08°30′00″E
	Su Marmuri Cave	Ulassai (OG)	Sardinia	?	755 m (2,477 ft)	39°49′36″N 09°30′00″E
	Tiscali Cave	Oliena (NU); Dorgali (NU)	Sardinia	?	500 m (1,600 ft)	40°14′30″N 09°29′30″E
	Toirano	Toirano (SV)	Liguria	2 km (1.2 mi)	50 m (160 ft)	44°07′00″N 08°13′00″E
	Trullo Cave	Putignano (BA)	Apulia	?	375 m (1,230 ft)	40°51′25″N 17°06′36″E
	Vento Cave	Vergemoli (LU)	Tuscany	4.5 km (2.8 mi)	650 m (2,130 ft)	44°03′00″N 10°22′00″E
	Verde	Capri (NA)	Campania	?	0 m (0 ft)	40°32′21″N 14°13′14″E
	Villanova Caves	Lusevera (UD); Nimis (UD)	Friuli-Venezia Giulia	4 km (2.5 mi)	500 m (1,600 ft)	46°16′00″N 06°16′00″E

== See also ==
- Grotto
- List of caves
