= Pico, Lazio =

Pico
- Comune
- Comune di Pico
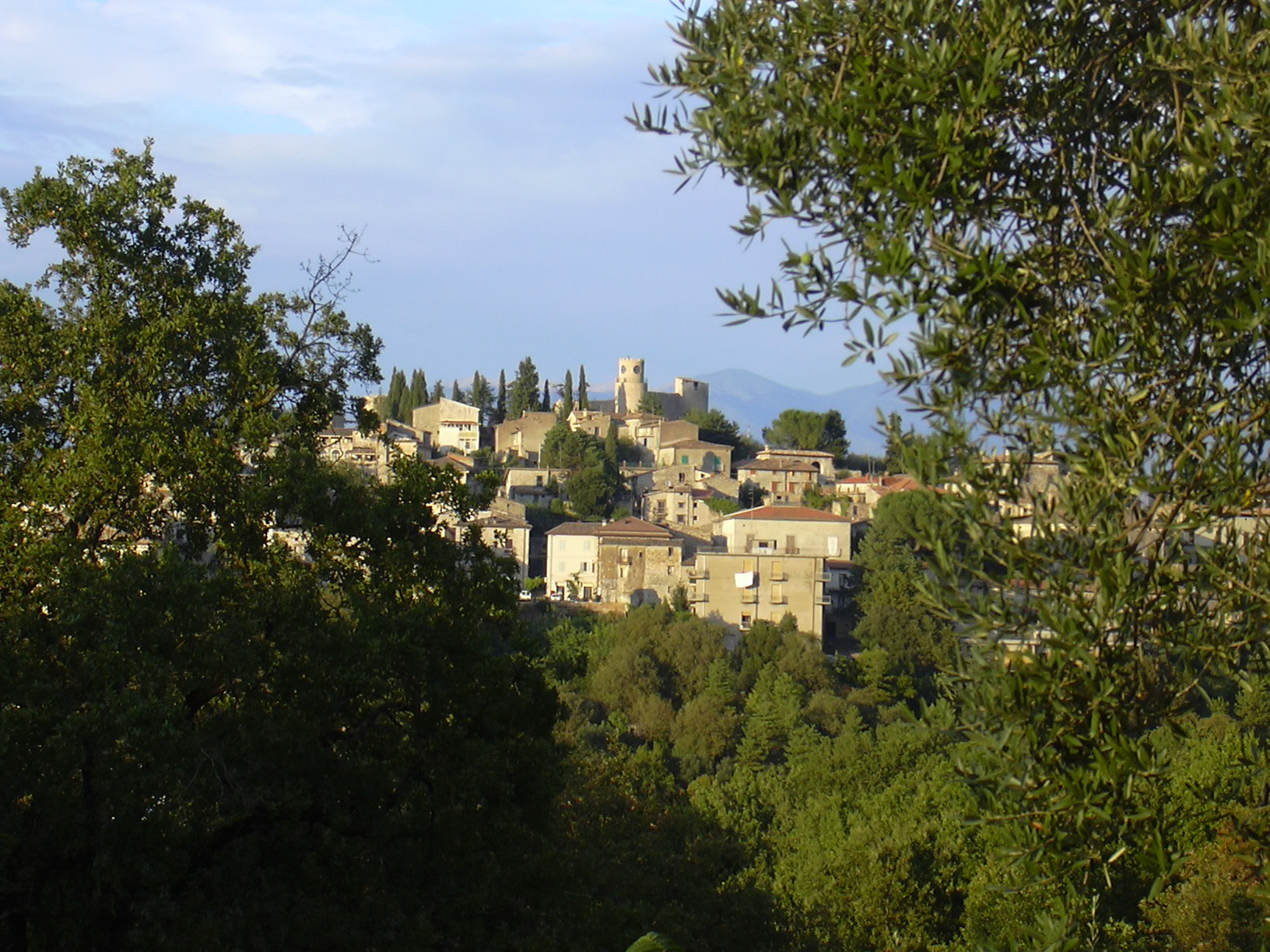
- View of Pico

- Coat of arms

- Location within Italy Location within Lazio
- Coordinates: 41°27′N 13°33′E
- Country: Italy
- Region: Lazio
- Province: Frosinone (FR)

Government
  - Mayor: Pier Luigi Lepore

Area
  - Total: 32.93 km^{2} (12.71 sq mi)
- Elevation: 190 m (620 ft)

Population (30 November 2019)
  - Total: 2,776
  - Density: 84.30/km^{2} (218.3/sq mi)
- Demonym: Picani
- Time zone: UTC+1 (CET)
  - Summer (DST): UTC+2 (CEST)
- Postal code: 03020
- Dialing code: 0776
- Patron saint: St. Antoninus and St. Marinella
- Saint day: June 20
- Website: Official website

Pico is a town and comune in the province of Frosinone, in the Lazio region of central Italy. It is bounded by other comunes of San Giovanni Incarico, Campodimele, Pontecorvo, Pastena and Lenola.

It is part of the Comunità Montana Monti Ausoni. Sights include the Farnese castle, founded around the 11th century AD. It is one of I Borghi più belli d'Italia ("The most beautiful villages of Italy").
