= Fabrateria =

Fabrateria can refer to two ancient cities in Italy:

- Fabrateria Nova ("New Fabrateria"), today San Giovanni Incarico
- Fabrateria Vetus ("Old Fabrateria"), today Ceccano
