= Abisso di Malga Fossetta =

Coordinates: 45°59′28″N 11°32′56″E

Abisso di Malga Fossetta (The Abyss of Malga Fossetta) is a deep cavity of the plateau of the Sette Comuni, a complex of karst full of caves (2,562 explored in 2009). The abyss is located in the municipality of Enego, in the province of Vicenza. The abyss of Malga Fossetta, with its currently known depth of more than 1,000 m, is the second deepest cavity in Veneto (the first to be discovered to exceed 1000 m deep) and one of the deepest in Italy.

Recent discoveries see a possible connection with the Grotta della Bigonda (one of the largest Italian caves) that would thus bring the depth of the abyss to more than 1,400 m, making it the deepest cave in Italy.

== Location ==
The entrance of the abyss lies in the immediate vicinity of Malga Fossetta (named after it), precisely at 1744m above sea level in the so-called Bosco dei Larese, not far from the slopes of Mount Ortigara, on the plateau of Asiago. At the entrance there is a large green metallic cylinder that forms the winter entrance of the cave, because in winter the snow covers the ground for several meters.

== History ==
The cavity was discovered by the Grotte Schio Group (GGS) in the 1970s and its exploration lasted for almost two decades before a momentary stop. It was the Growth Group "E. Roner" in Rovereto that, starting from the mid-nineties, went back to exploring the cave. Subsequently, the two groups joined forces and on June 3, 2011, together with the CAI Grotto Group, the caves had reached the new depth of 1,011 m (previously the cave had been measured deep-974 m).

== Geomorphology ==
The cavity appears as a long sequence of wells varying depths. The wells are generally wide and, at least up to -400 m, the maximum vertical is 54 m. In addition to -450m there is an enormous cascade well of 200m depth where, after passing a long and small meander and a subsequent series of small wells, the cave doubled to reach the old -940m bottom and the current bottom - 1011m. The cave develops initially in the Calcari Grigi and then almost completely in the Dolomia Principale.
