= Stiffe Caves =

Caves in Abruzzo, Italy

Grotte di Stiffe (Stiffe Caves)
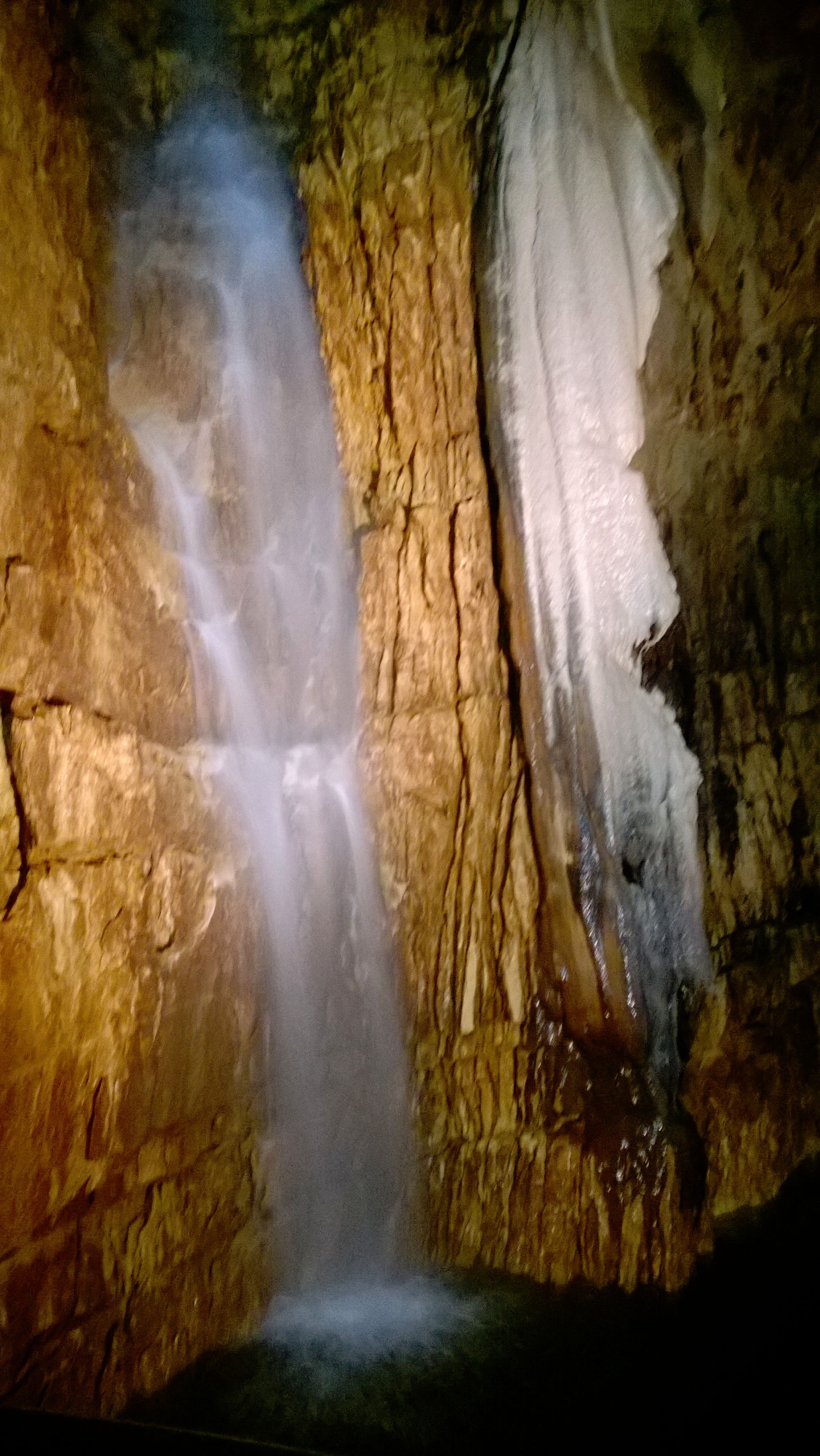
- Stiffe Caves

- Location within Italy
- Location: San Demetrio ne' Vestini (AQ, Abruzzo,Italy)
- Coordinates: 42°15′20.62″N 13°32′32.51″E
- Length: 1,000 m
- Elevation: 696 m
- Geology: Karst cave
- Entrances: 1
- Access: Public
- Show cave opened: 1958
- Show cave length: 1,200 m
- Website: Official website

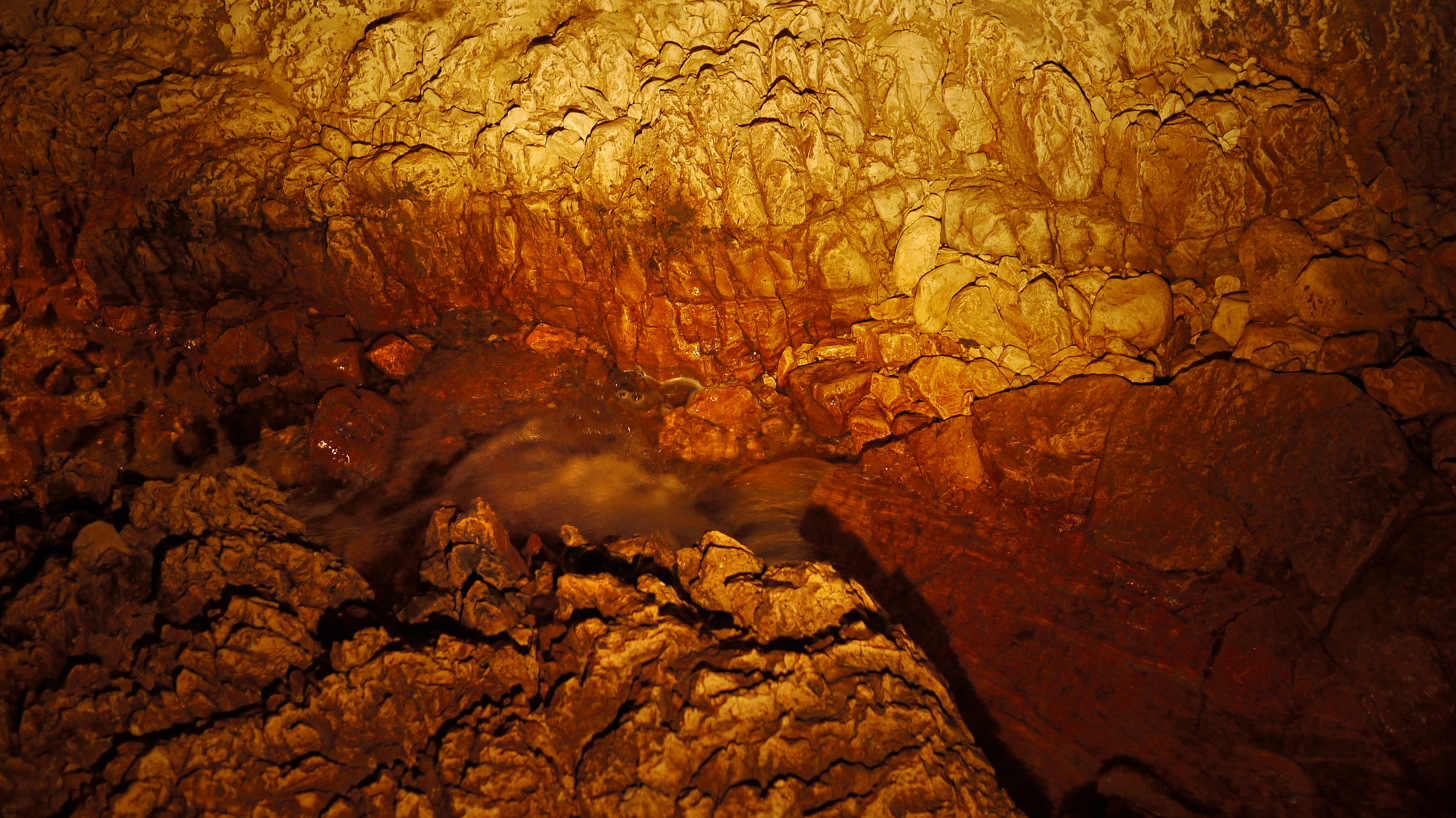
Stiffe Caves

The Stiffe Caves (Italian: Grotte di Stiffe), are a karst show cave system located in the municipality of San Demetrio ne' Vestini, in the province of L'Aquila, Abruzzo, Italy.

From 1996 to 2018 the site was managed by the public-private company Progetto Stiffe S.p.A., while it is currently managed directly by the Municipality of San Demetrio ne' Vestini. The 2009 earthquake led to the closure of the caves for safety reasons; the complex was reopened to the public only in 2011. In the following decade, the Stiffe caves consolidated themselves as one of the major tourist sites in the province of L'Aquila and the whole Abruzzo, as well as one of the main speleological sites in Italy; By 2025, the complex had recorded over 67,000 visitors.

== Visiting Route ==
The visiting route begins in Stiffe, approximately 3 km from San Demetrio ne' Vestini and 15 km from Aquila, accessible from the Subequana State Road 261. The ticket office and visitor center are located at the entrance to the town, while the entrance to the route is further upstream at the mouth of the river.

The paid tourist route lasts about 1 hour and covers approximately 1.4 km, a round trip to the second waterfall.

Entrance
The entrance to the caves is at the mouth of the Stiffe, a prominent crevice in the mountain just above the town, about 2 km from the visitor center. A walkway goes up the stream, entering beneath a 100m rock face. The entrance is overlooked by other cavities such as the "Grotta dei Briganti", probably produced by a fossil branch of the resurgence but currently not accessible to the public. The trail reaches a first cavity where important archaeological remains have been discovered.

Hall of Silence
After passing the first cavity, through a canyon, you reach a large room known as the Hall of Silence. The name derives from the fact that the river tends to dry up here, canceling out the typical noise of the rest of the trail.

Hall of the Waterfall
The Hall of Silence is the antechamber to the first waterfall, which drops over 20 meters on a 30-meter-high wall created by the vertical sliding of rocks. The wall created an initial barrier to the tourist route, which was later overcome by the construction of a staircase with a viewpoint overlooking the waterfall.

Hall of the Concretion and Black Lake
Going up the Hall of the Waterfall, you once again enter a quiet and dimly lit space, characterized by the typical presence of stalactite and stalagmite. Further on, the room expands and houses a vast expanse of water known as the Black Lake, one of the oldest parts of the complex; the delicate nature of the concretions has led to visitor access being limited to some areas.

Second Waterfall
After a further climb, you reach the area most recently opened to the public and characterised by the presence of a second thunderous waterfall. The jump, over 25m, flows into a pond about 5m deep inside a particularly large and scenic room.

== See also ==
- List of caves
- List of caves in Italy
