= Monti Ausoni =

Mountain range in Italy

- Ausoni Mountains
- Location within Italy

Naming
- Etymology: Ausoni people

Geography
- Country: Italy
- Region: Lazio
- Province: Latina
- Range coordinates: 41°25′N 13°20′E
- Parent range: Apennine Mountains, Volsci Chain

Geology
- Orogeny: Southern Apenninic Orogeny
- Rock age(s): Messinian of Miocene, Pliocene-Pleistocene
- Rock type: limestone karst

The Monti Ausoni or Ausoni Mountains constitute a mountain range in southern Lazio, in central Italy. It is part of the Antiappennini, a group running from the Apennines chain to the Tyrrhenian Sea. They are bounded to the north by the Monti Lepini and to the south by the Monti Aurunci. They take the name from the ancient tribe of the Ausoni. The Monti Ausoni consist mainly of friable limestone. Altitudes vary from hills to the 1,152 m of Cima del Nibbio and the 1,141 m of Monte Calvo. Near Pastena are the Grotte di Pastena (caves).

Part of the mountains is protected by a wilderness area, which was established in 1999. It covers 4,230 hectares. Most of the valleys are covered in forests (of oak, cork oak and maple). There are also species of Quercus virginiana, carpinella, aspen and laurel. Beneath the trees are numerous rare and endemic flora, such as Crocus imperati subsp. imperati, Narcissus Poeticus, Asphodeline lutea (asfodelina), Daphne oleoides (spatula daphne) and Iris relicta.
