= Toirano Caves =

Cave system in Italy

Grotte di Toirano (Toirano Caves)
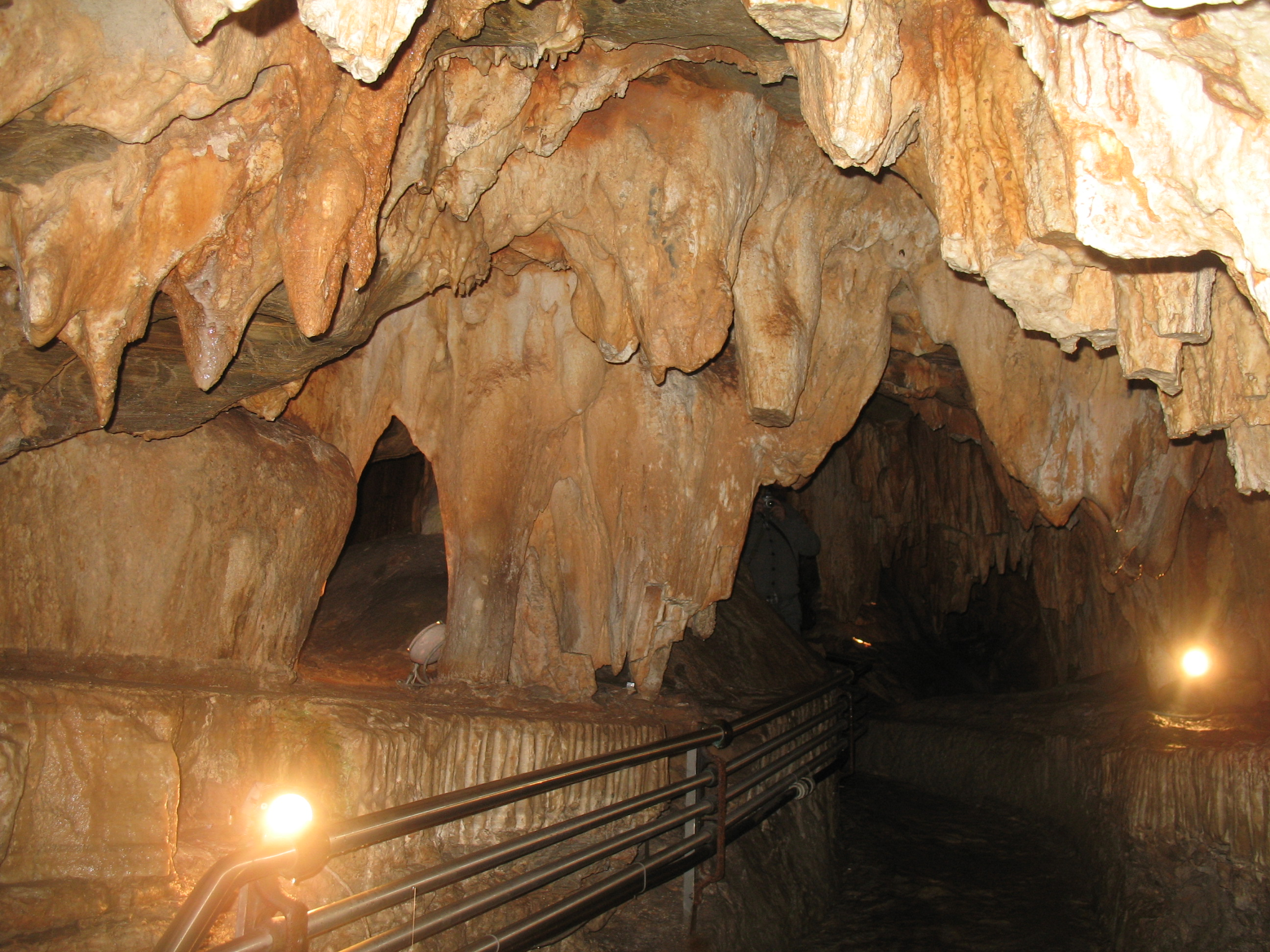
- Interior view

- Location within Italy
- Location: Toirano (SV, Liguria, Italy)
- Coordinates: 44°8′9.6″N 8°12′3.6″E
- Length: 2,000 m
- Elevation: 50 m
- Discovery: 1950
- Geology: Karst cave
- Entrances: 1
- Access: Public
- Show cave opened: 1953
- Show cave length: ?
- Website: Official website

The Toirano Caves (Italian: Grotte di Toirano) are a karst cave system in the municipality of Toirano, in the province of Savona, Liguria, Italy.

== Overview ==
The area is situated close to the town of Toirano and few kilometers to the Ligurian Ponente Riviera. The exit "Borghetto Santo Spirito" of A10 motorway is 5 km far from the caves. One of the most important caves is "Basura", discovered in 1950, and shelter of the Cave bear (Ursus spelaeus).

== Gallery ==
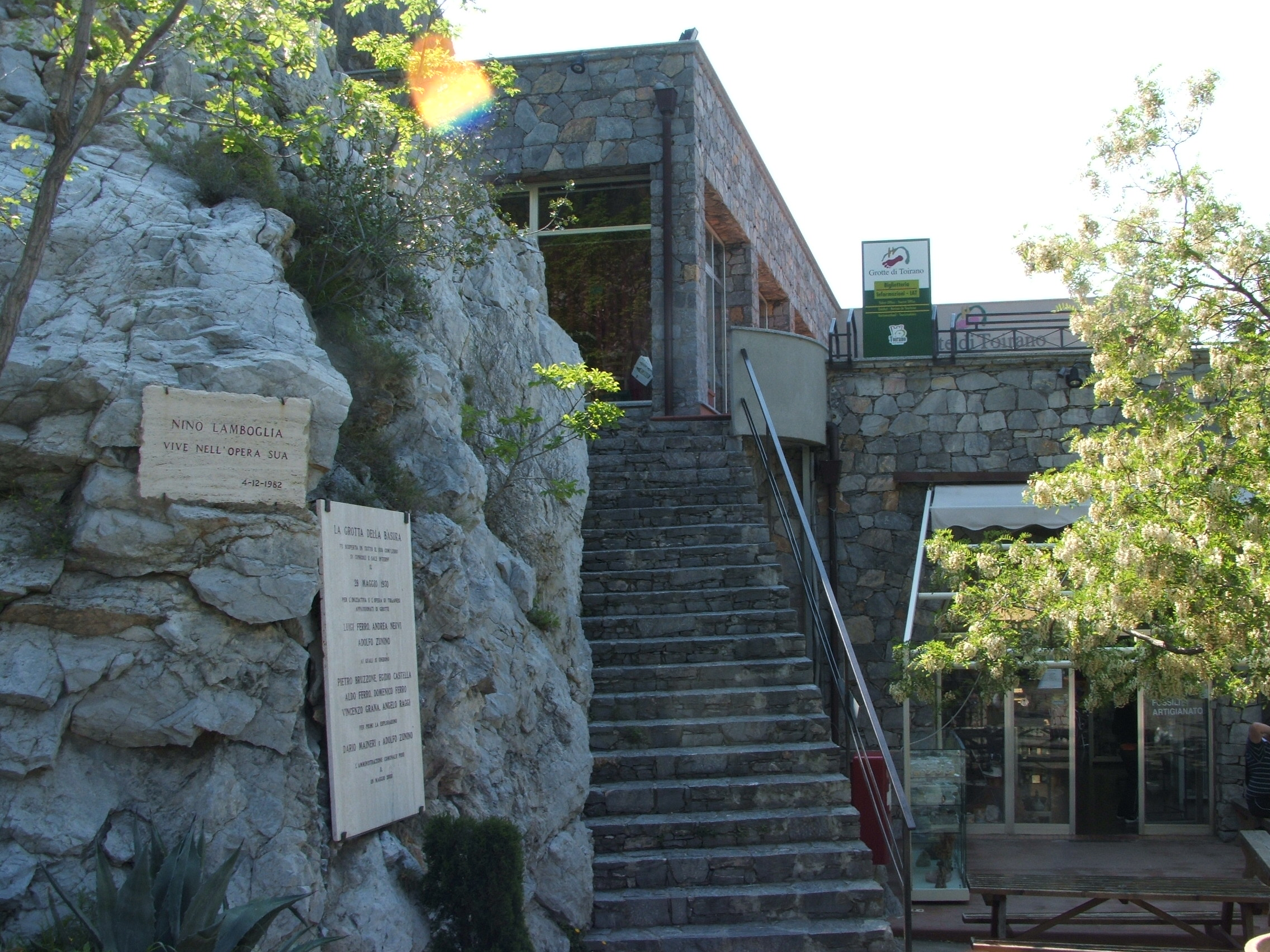
Entrance

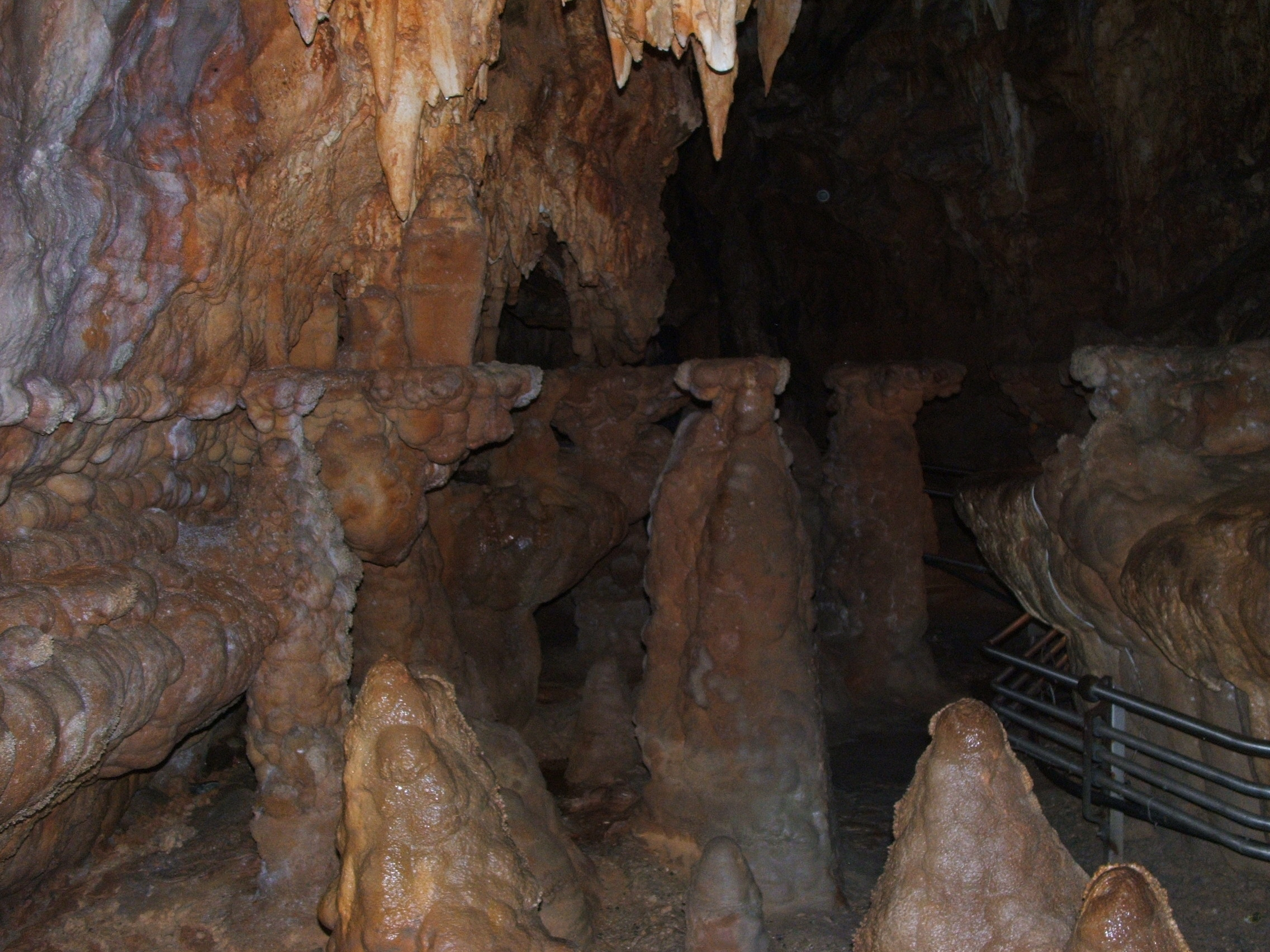
Speleothems width widening at certain height

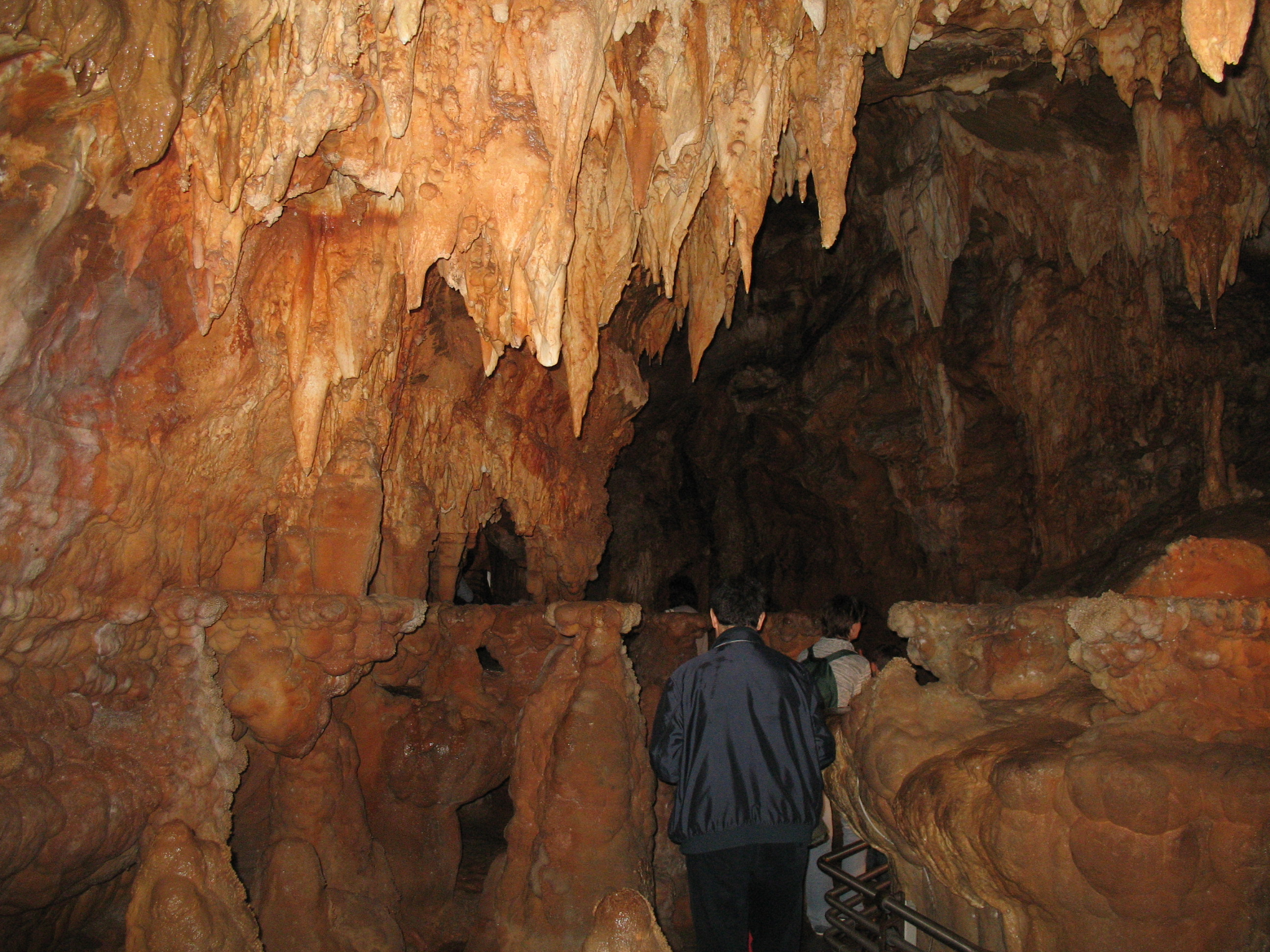
Speleothems width widening at certain height

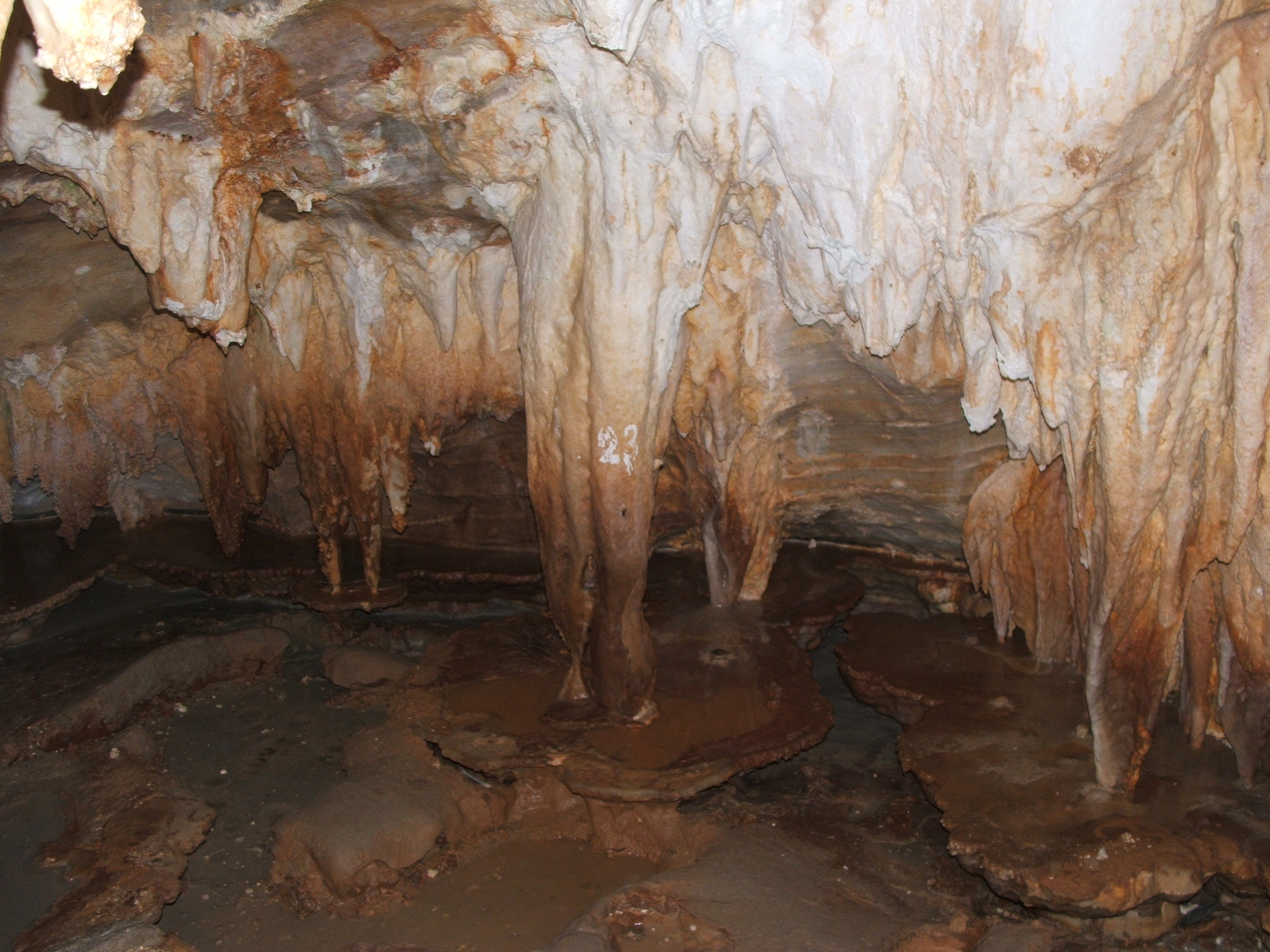
Stalactites

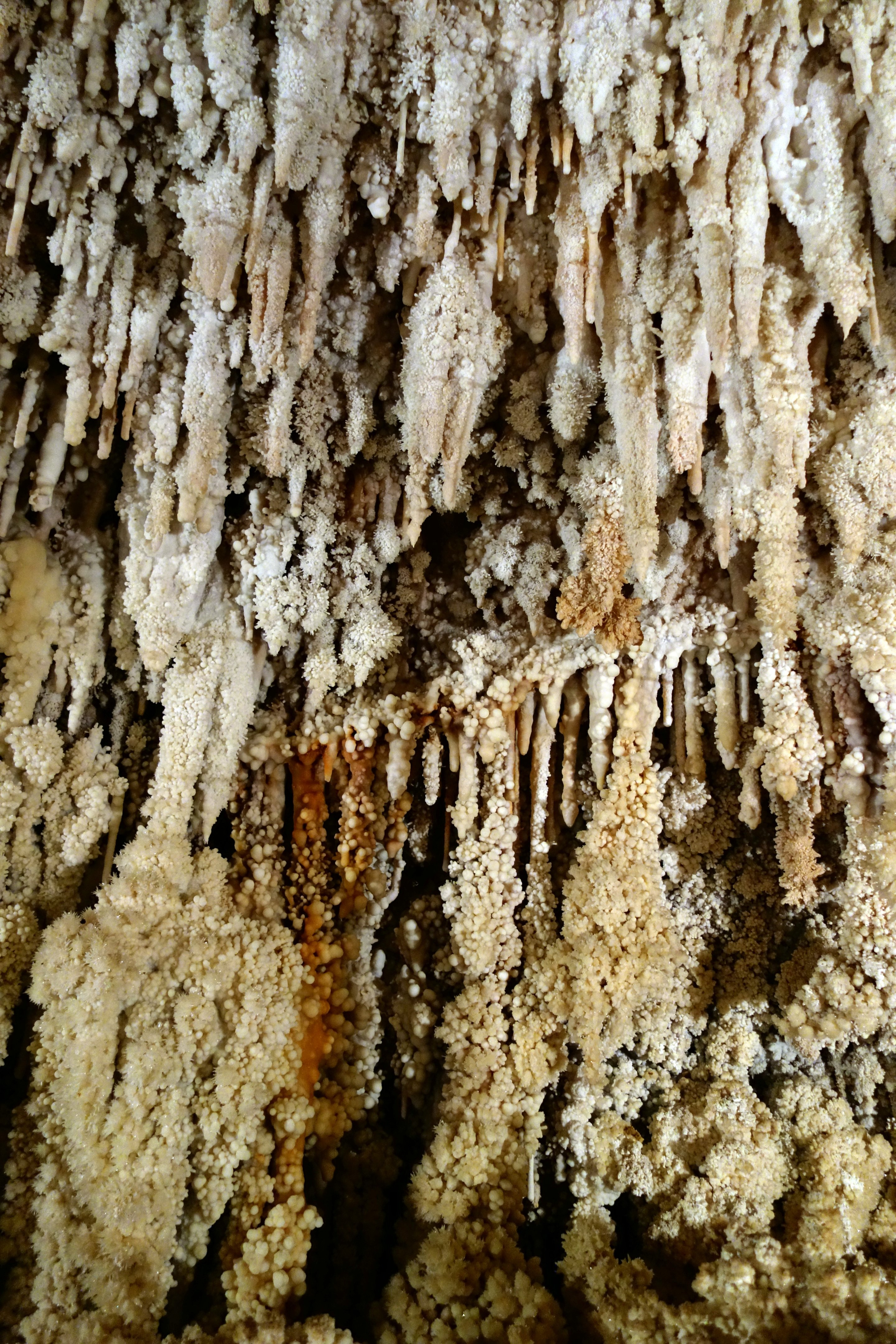
Stalactites with spikes

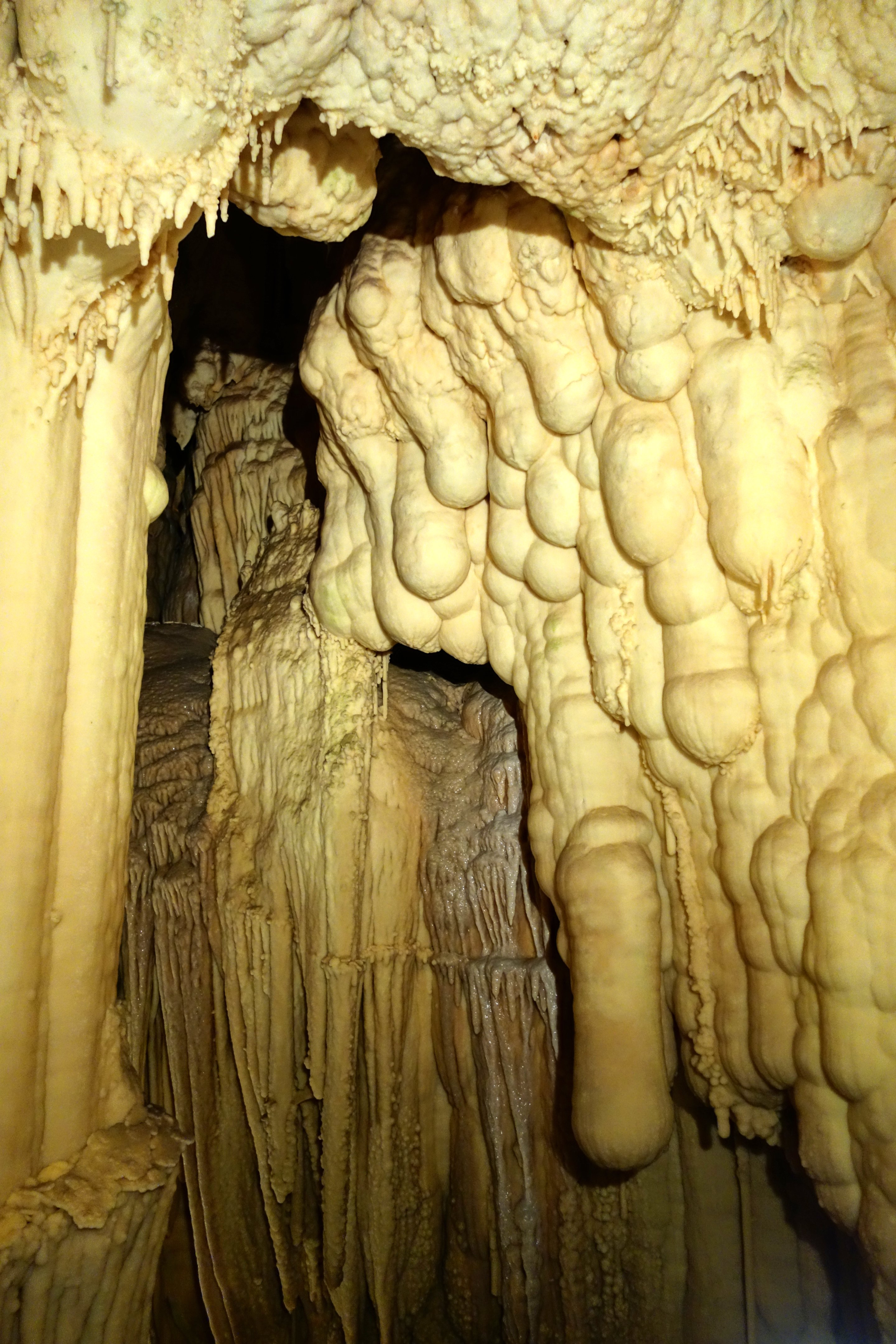
Wide stalactites

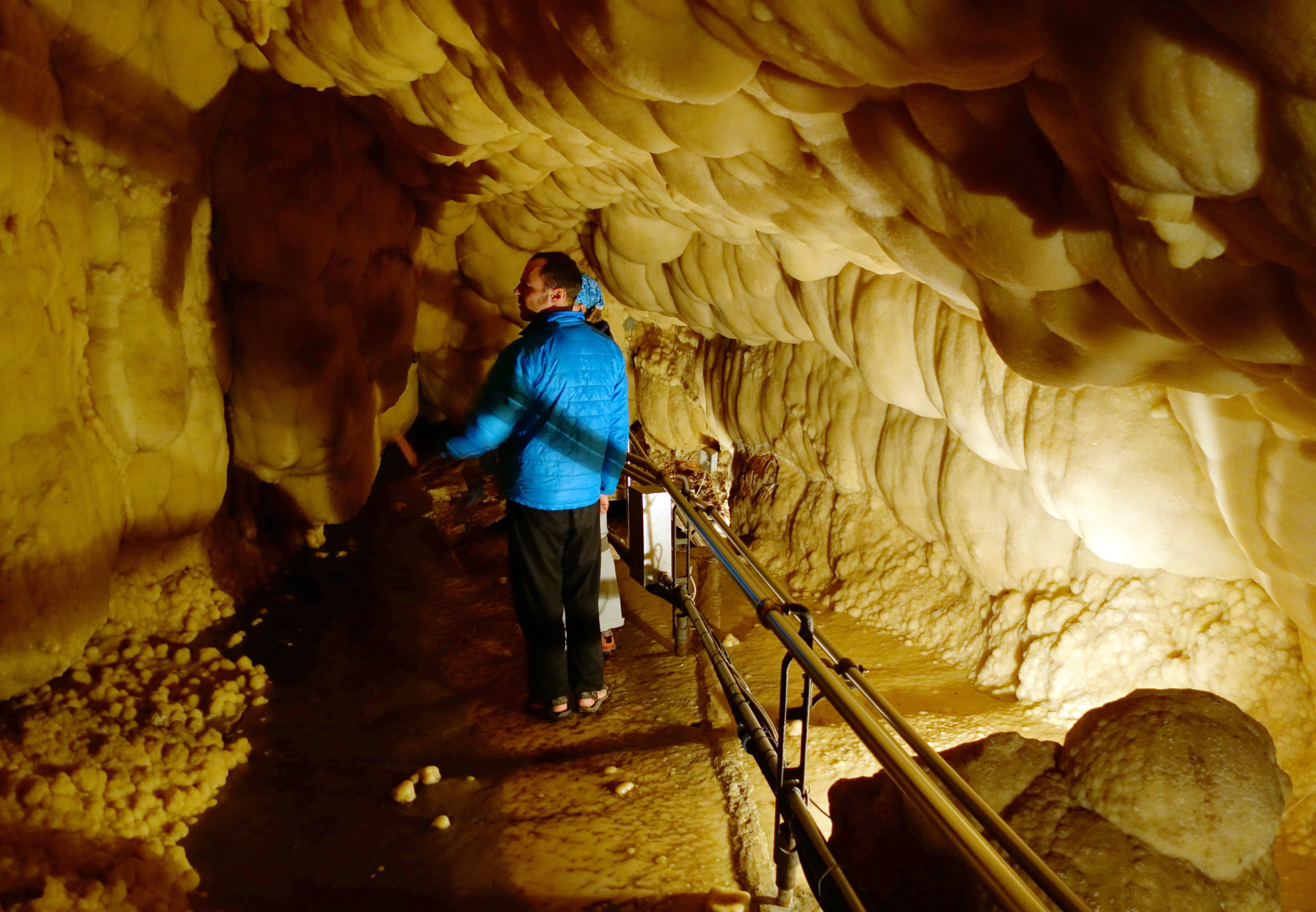
Hall

== See also ==
- Borgio Verezzi Caves
- List of caves
- List of caves in Italy
