= Falvaterra =

- Comune
- Comune di Falvaterra
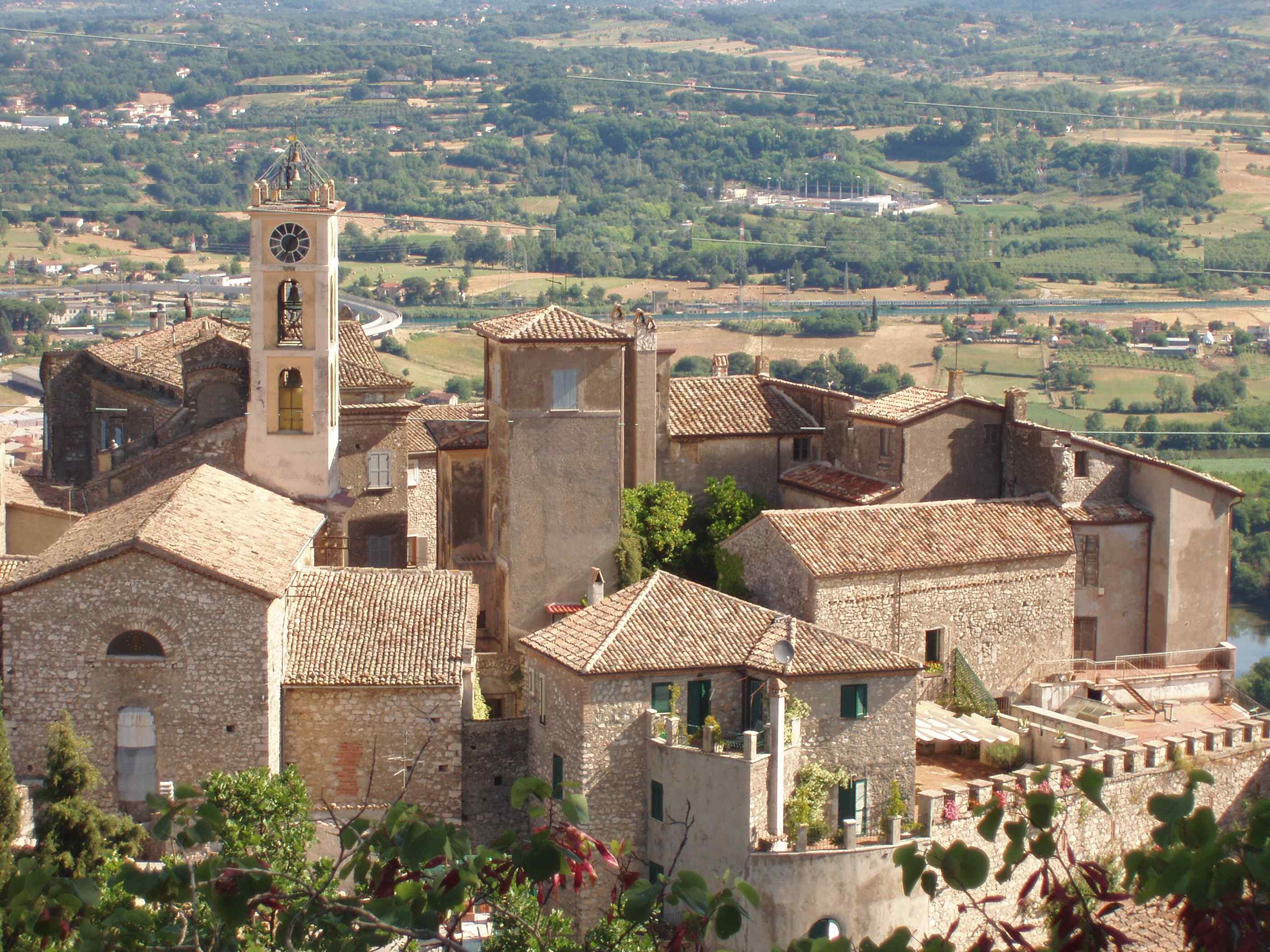
- View of Falvaterra

- Location within Italy Location within Lazio
- Coordinates: 41°30′17″N 13°31′26″E
- Country: Italy
- Region: Lazio
- Province: Frosinone (FR)

Government
  - Mayor: Francesco Piccirilli

Area
  - Total: 12.73 km^{2} (4.92 sq mi)
- Elevation: 282 m (925 ft)

Population (30 November 2019)
  - Total: 544
  - Density: 42.7/km^{2} (111/sq mi)
- Demonym: Falvaterrani
- Time zone: UTC+1 (CET)
  - Summer (DST): UTC+2 (CEST)
- Postal code: 03020
- Dialing code: 0775
- Patron saint: St. Sosius
- Saint day: First Sunday of September
- Website: Official website

Falvaterra is a comune (municipality) in the Province of Frosinone in the Italian region Lazio, located about 100 kilometres (62 mi) southeast of Rome and about 20 kilometres (12 mi) southeast of Frosinone.

Falvaterra borders the following municipalities: Arce, Castro dei Volsci, Ceprano, Pastena, San Giovanni Incarico. It is the seat of the eponymous karst grottoes, having a length of more than 5 kilometres (3 mi).
