= Campodimele =

- Comune
- Comune di Campodimele
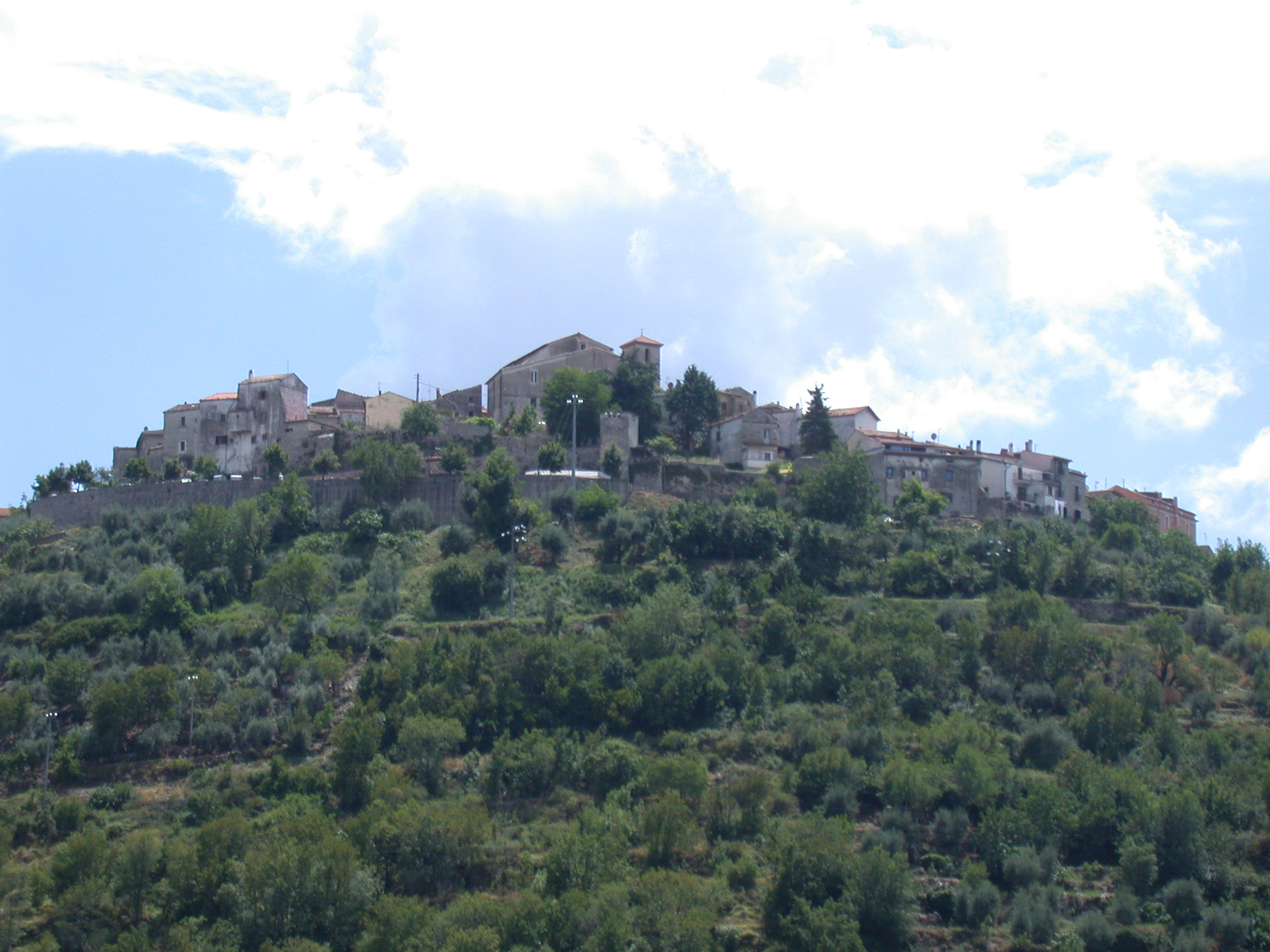
- View of Campodimele

- Coat of arms

- Location within Italy Location within Lazio
- Coordinates: 41°23′N 13°32′E
- Country: Italy
- Region: Lazio
- Province: Latina (LT)

Government
  - Mayor: Roberto Zannella

Area
  - Total: 38.38 km^{2} (14.82 sq mi)
- Elevation: 647 m (2,123 ft)

Population (31 March 2017)
  - Total: 604
  - Density: 15.7/km^{2} (40.8/sq mi)
- Demonym: Campomelani
- Time zone: UTC+1 (CET)
  - Summer (DST): UTC+2 (CEST)
- Postal code: 04020
- Dialing code: 0771
- Patron saint: St Onuphrius
- Saint day: 12 June
- Website: Official website

Campodimele is a town and comune in the province of Latina, in the Lazio region of central Italy. It is located on a steep Karstic hill, between the Monti Ausoni and Monti Aurunci ranges.

The economy is mostly based on agriculture.

== History ==
Campus Mellis rose probably over the roof Apiola, a very ancient Latin city, destroyed by Tarquinius Priscus, fifth king of Rome (579 BC); the ruins of Apiola are visible 6 kilometres (4 mi) away from the present-day historic center of Campodimele. In the 6th century AD, the Lombards established the first fortified settlement, while in the following century it was part of the possessions of the Monastery of Montecassino.

From 916, it was acquired by the Duchy of Gaeta. Campo de Melle is mentioned again in a donation by the Consul of Fondi in 1072. In 1087, Pope Victor III had a list of the abbey's property sculpted onto the bronze door of the Basilica of Montecassino. In 1384, it became a possession of the Caetani family of Fondi, but, in 1497, King Frederick IV of Naples gave the county of Fondi with the surrounding duchies, including Campodimele, to the Colonna family.

In 1534, Giulia Gonzaga fled here from the Algerian pirate Hayreddin Barbarossa. In 1591, the fief was inherited by Luigi Carafa, Prince of Stigliano. Campodimele gained municipal rights in 1813.

During World War II, the Gustav Line passed through Campodimele. Alberto Moravia, who had been deported here, took inspiration from the happenings of the time for his novel La Ciociara.

== Main sights ==
- The walls (11th century AD).
- Monastery of Sant'Onofrio, founded by Desiderius of Montecassino in the 11th century.
- Parish church of San Michele Arcangelo, built in the 11th century over a pre-existing pagan temple.
- Church of Annunziata (13th century)

== Transportation ==
Campodimele can be reached through the Liri Valley State Road 82.

== Longevity of residents ==
Campodimele is known for the longevity of its residents, with the town's population now expected to live to an average age of 95.
