= Grigno =

- Comune
- Comune di Grigno
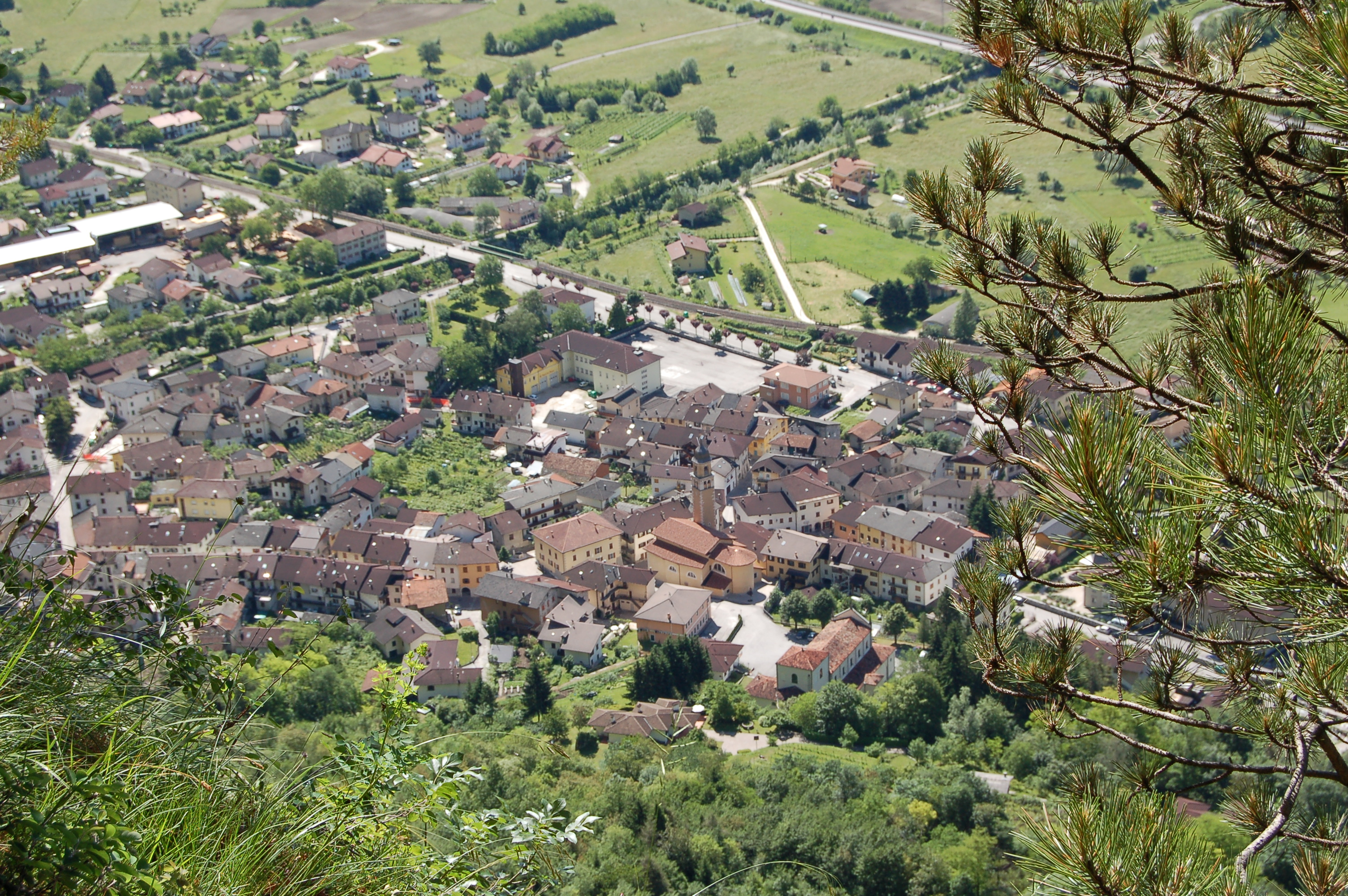

- Location within Italy Location within Trentino-Alto Adige/Südtirol
- Coordinates: 46°1′N 11°38′E
- Country: Italy
- Region: Trentino-Alto Adige/Südtirol
- Province: Trentino (TN)
- Frazioni: Selva di Grigno, Puele, Maso Tollo, Palù, Serafini, Belvedere, Tezze, Martincelli, Pianello di sopra, Pianello di sotto

Government
  - Mayor: Claudio Voltolini

Area
  - Total: 46.4 km^{2} (17.9 sq mi)
- Elevation: 263 m (863 ft)

Population (2026)
  - Total: 2,030
  - Density: 43.7/km^{2} (113/sq mi)
- Demonym: Grignati
- Time zone: UTC+1 (CET)
  - Summer (DST): UTC+2 (CEST)
- Postal code: 38055
- Dialing code: 0461
- Website: Official website

Grigno (Grigno in local dialect) is a comune (municipality) in Trentino in the northern Italian region Trentino-Alto Adige/Südtirol, located about 40 kilometres (25 mi) east of Trento.

Grigno borders the following municipalities: Castello Tesino, Cinte Tesino, Ospedaletto, Arsiè, Asiago, Cismon del Grappa and Enego. it is home to the Grotta della Bigonda and Grotta Calgeron grotto complexes, as well as two prehistorical archaeological sites (Riparo Dalmeri and Grotta di Ernesto).
