= Borgio Verezzi Caves =

Cave complex

Grotte di Borgio Verezzi (Borgio Verezzi Caves)
- Valdemino
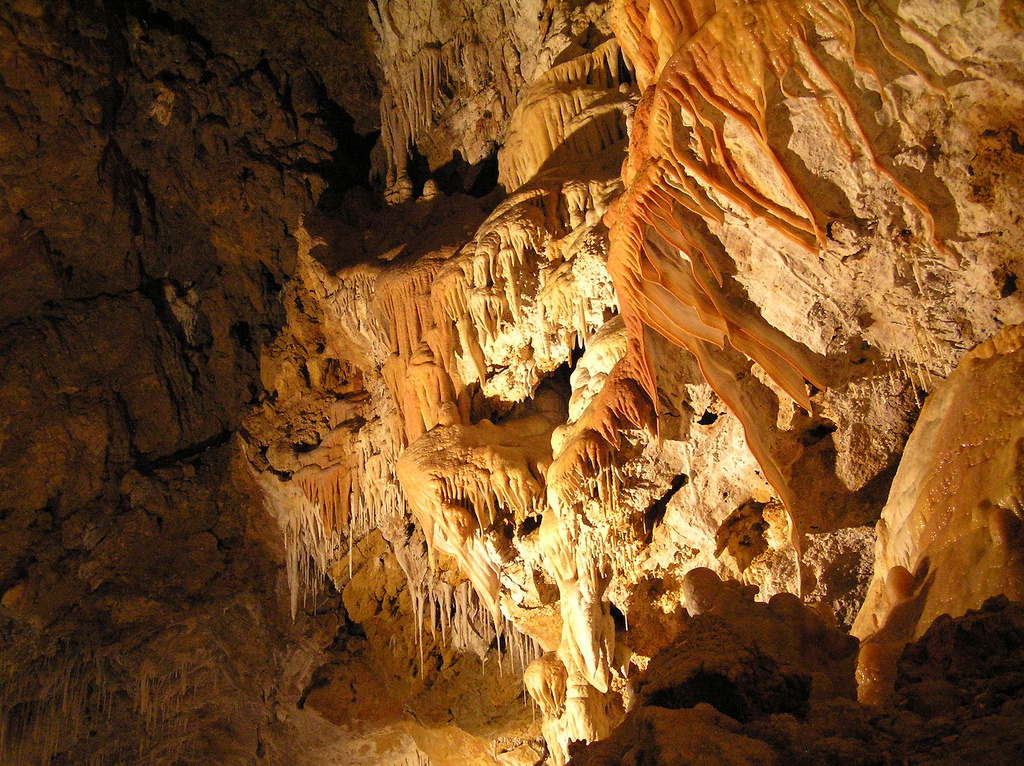
- Interior view

- Location within Italy
- Location: Borgio Verezzi (SV, Liguria, Italy)
- Coordinates: 44°9′35.26″N 8°18′19.16″E
- Elevation: 200 m
- Discovery: 1933
- Geology: Karst cave
- Entrances: 1
- Access: Public
- Show cave opened: 1970
- Show cave length: 800 m
- Website: Official website

The Borgio Verezzi Caves (Italian: Grotte di Borgio Verezzi), also named Valdemino, are a karst cave system located in the municipality of Borgio Verezzi, in the province of Savona, Liguria. They are a show cave.

== Overview ==
Located in the outskirts of Borgio, the main town and seat of the municipality, the caves were discovered in 1933. The tourist route, opened in 1970, is 800 m (2,600 ft) long and features several small lakes, due to the presence of a little river named Rio Battorezza.

The Valdemino have been referred to as "the most colorful show caves of Italy", due to the presence of various minerals. Main colors are white, yellow, red and related shades. The cave contains many straws, amongst them the longest known in Italy with a length of 2.5 m (8.2 ft).

Some prehistoric bone remains, dated to between 500,000 and 750,000 years ago, have been found in various hollows.

== Gallery ==
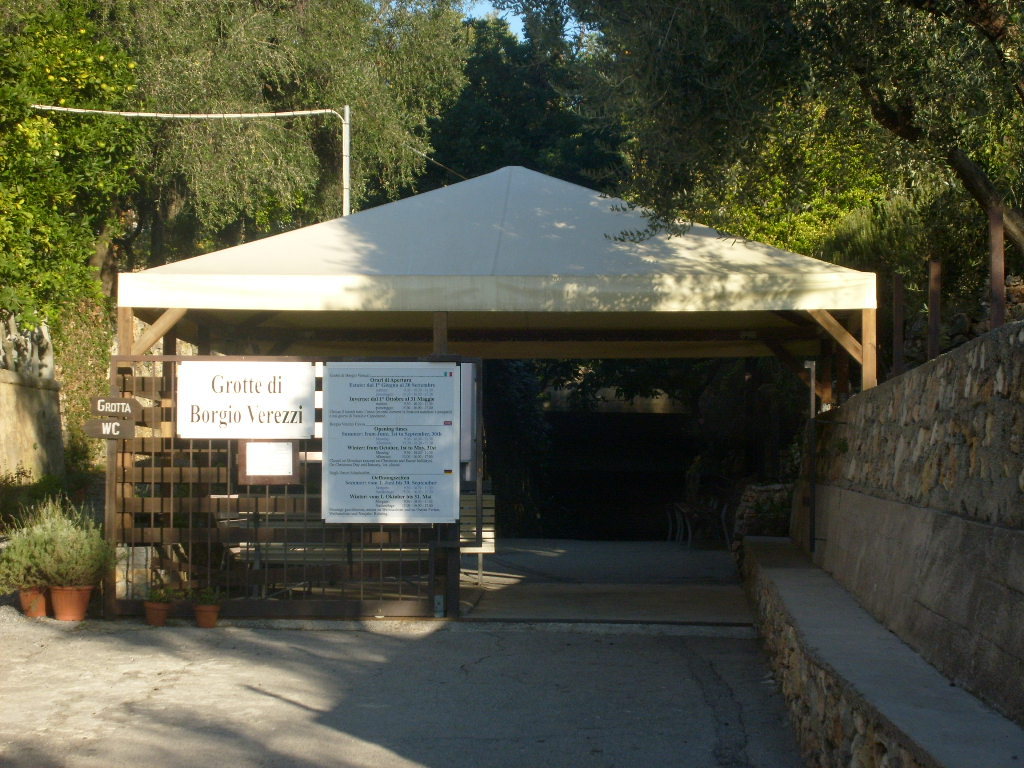
Entrance

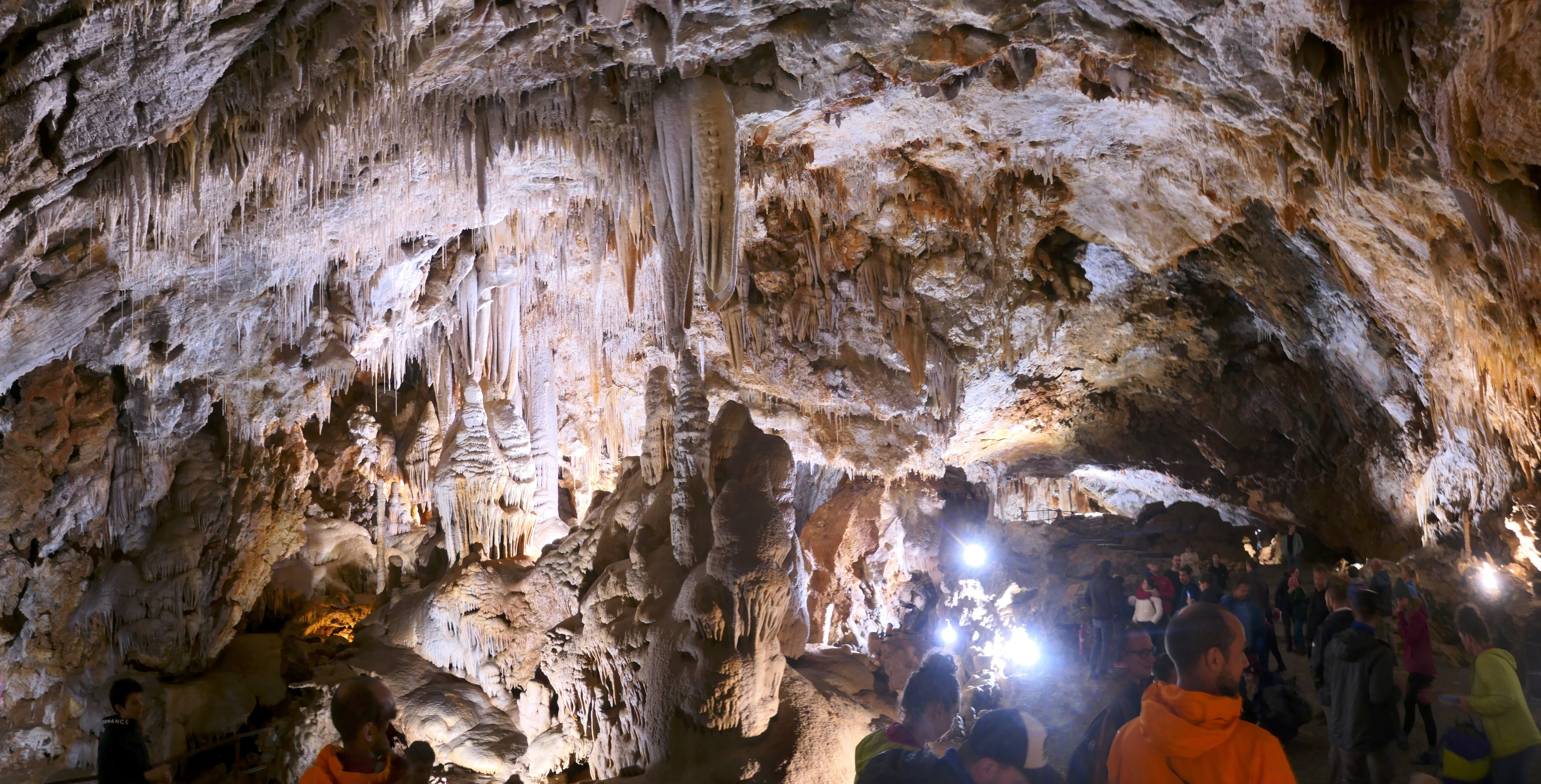
Hall with various speleothems

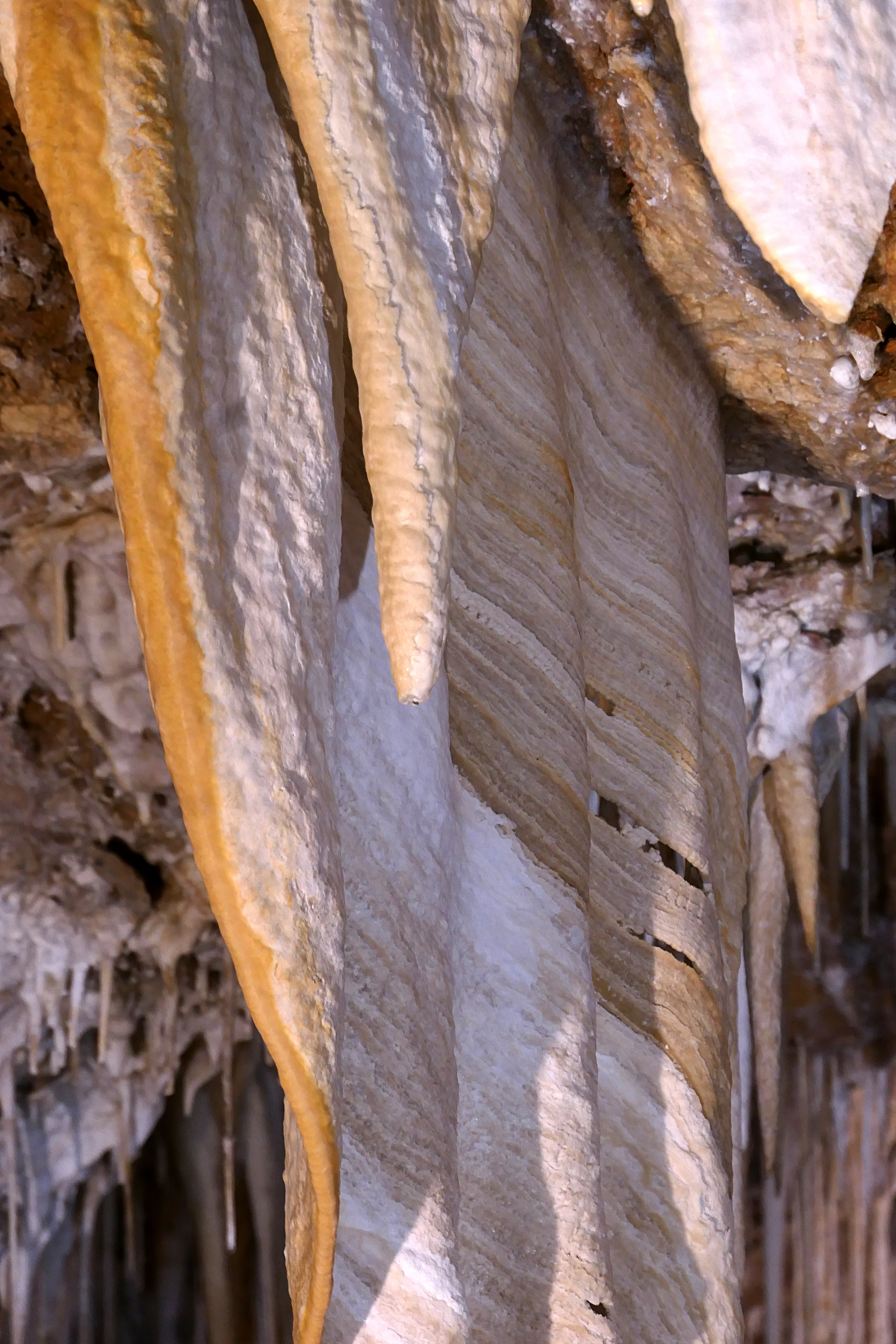
Big draperies

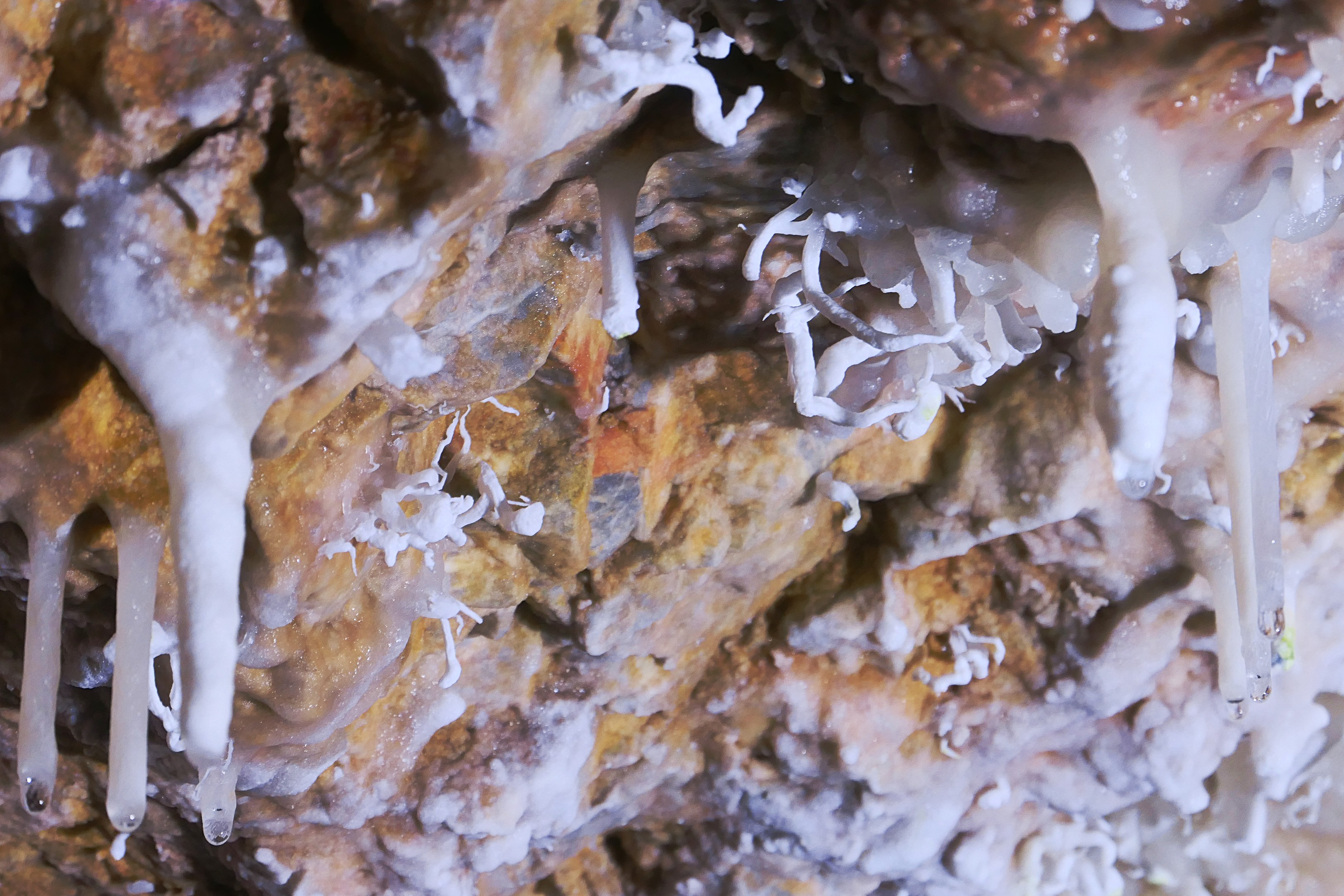
Helictite type of dripstone

== See also ==
- Toirano Caves
- List of caves
- List of caves in Italy
