= Grotta del Gelo =

Volcanic cave of Mount Etna in Sicily, Italy

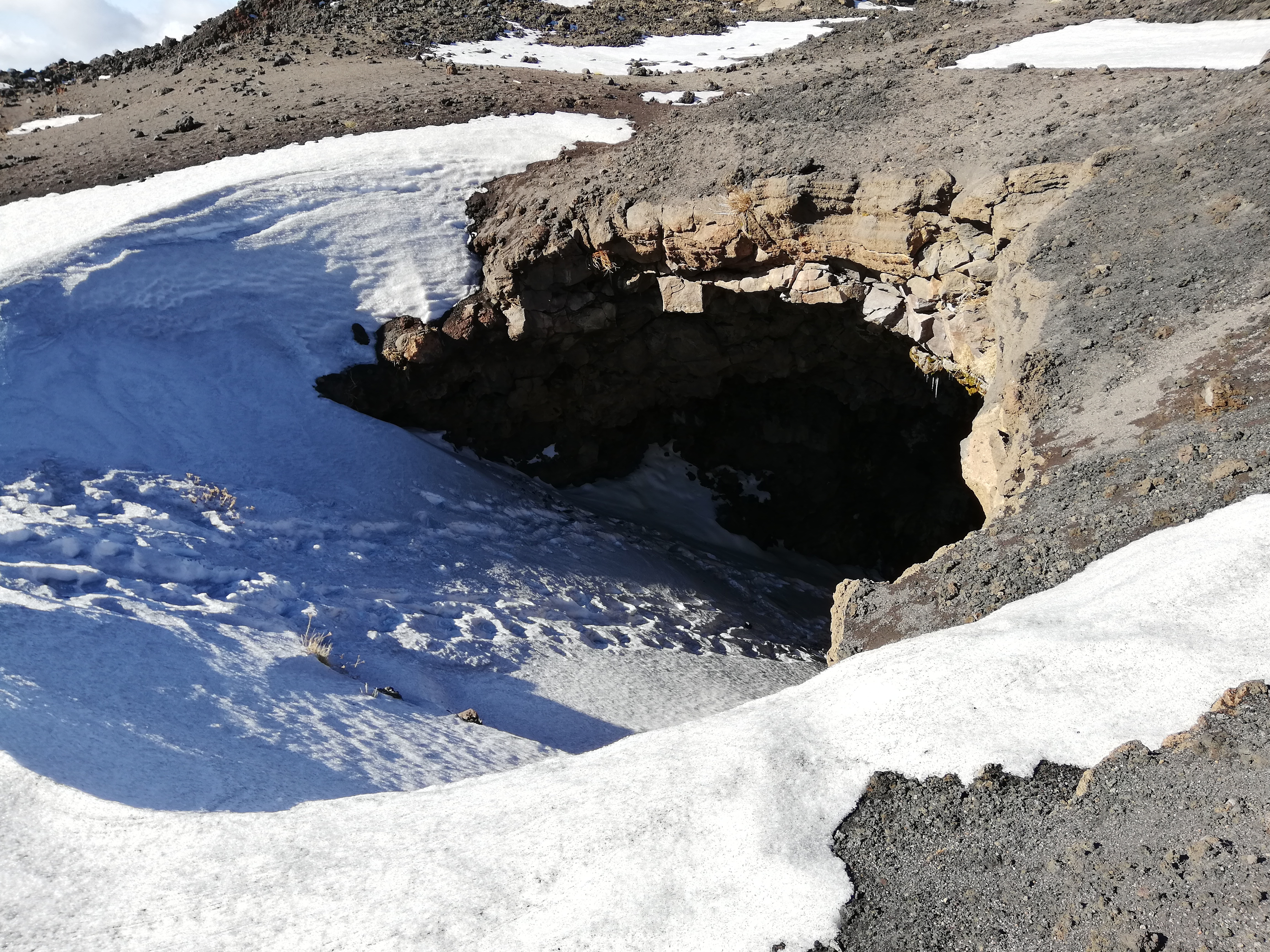
- Entrance to the cave.

- Location within Sicily Location within Italy
- Interactive map of Grotta del Gelo
- Coordinates: 37°48′16″N 14°59′03″E
- Length: 120 metres (390 ft)
- Elevation: 2,030–2,043 metres (6,660–6,703 ft)

Grotta del Gelo ("Cave of Frost") is a volcanic cave of Mount Etna which is known for the presence of a large amount of ice. The cave formed in 1614–1624 during a large eruption of the volcano, inside one of the lava flows produced during that eruption. Within the two subsequent decades, ice grew and accumulated in the cave. Today it is a tourist destination.

== Geography and geomorphology ==
Grotta del Gelo lies at 2,030 metres (6,660 ft)–2,043 metres (6,703 ft) elevation on Etna's northern/northwestern flank, in the municipality of Randazzo and within the Etna National Park. The cave can be reached by foot from Piano Provenzana. Other caves in the area are the Grotta dei Aci, Grotta dei Lamponi and Grotta dei Pastori, the first two of which formed during the same eruption as the Grotta del Gelo. There are also two volcanic cones, Monte Nero and Monte Pizzillo, and the vents of the 1923 and 1947 eruptions in the area. The first record of the cave is found in Sartorius von Walterhausen's 1880 work, as "Bocche del Gelo".

=== Cave ===
This 120 metres (390 ft) long and about 7 metres (23 ft) wide lava tube can be accessed through a 10 by 5 metres (33 ft × 16 ft) wide entrance at the upper end of the tube. The cave formed during the 1614–1624 eruption of Etna, which formed the "lava dei Dammusi" lava flows on Etna's western flank. Part of this lava flow system is the "Sciara del Follone" that contains the cave. This long-lasting eruption emplaced about 1.05 cubic kilometres (0.25 cu mi) of lava on a surface of about 21 square kilometres (8.1 sq mi). The surface of the lava flows, exposed to the air, cooled and solidified to form a crust on the remaining flow. These crusts were left behind when the still-flowing lava in the cavities drained, leaving cavities of various shapes and sizes. Due to the great thickness of the lava flow – 50 metres (160 ft) on average – it probably took at least a decade for it to cool sufficiently for ice to form within.

== Ice ==
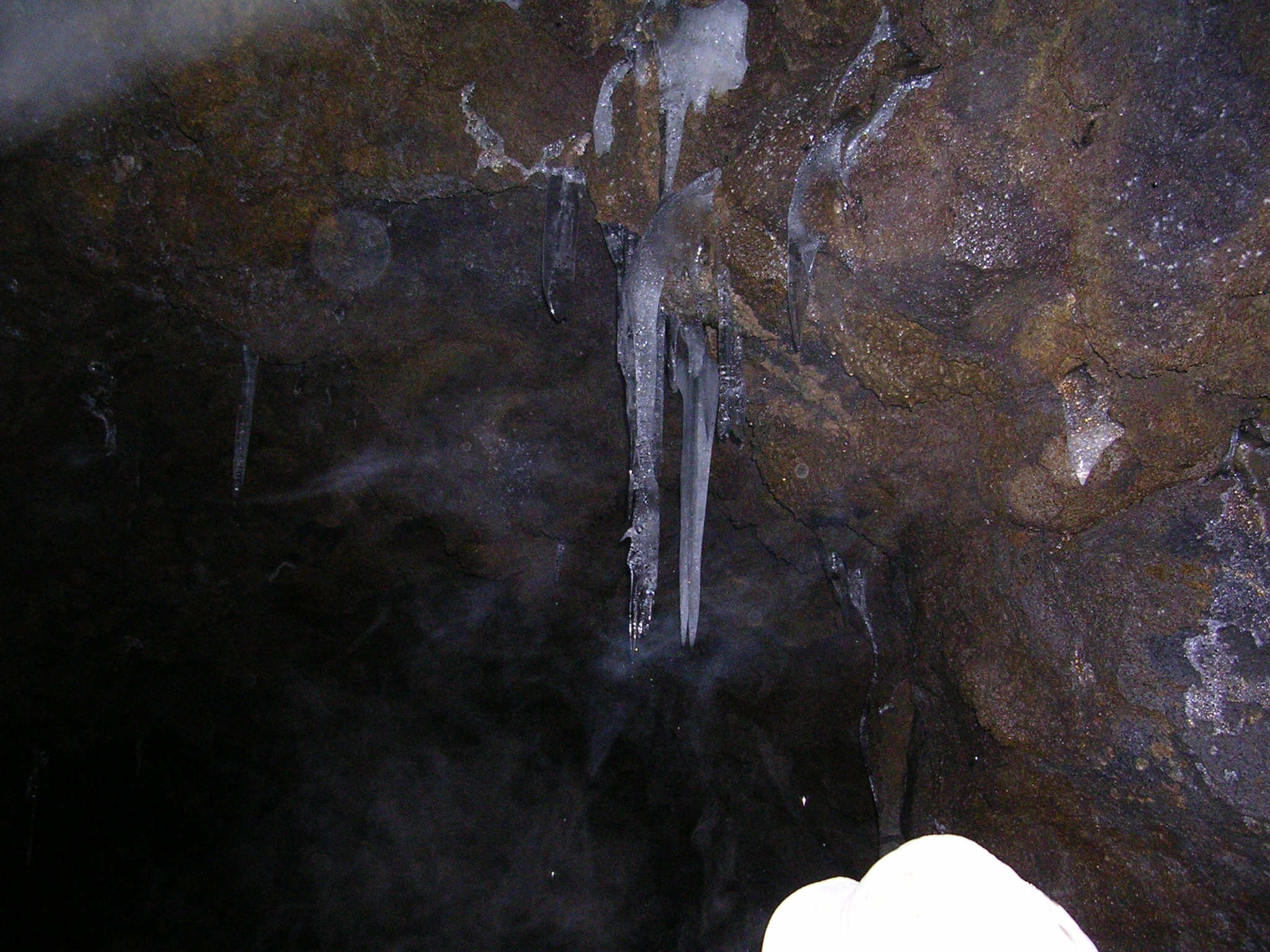
Ice inside the cave

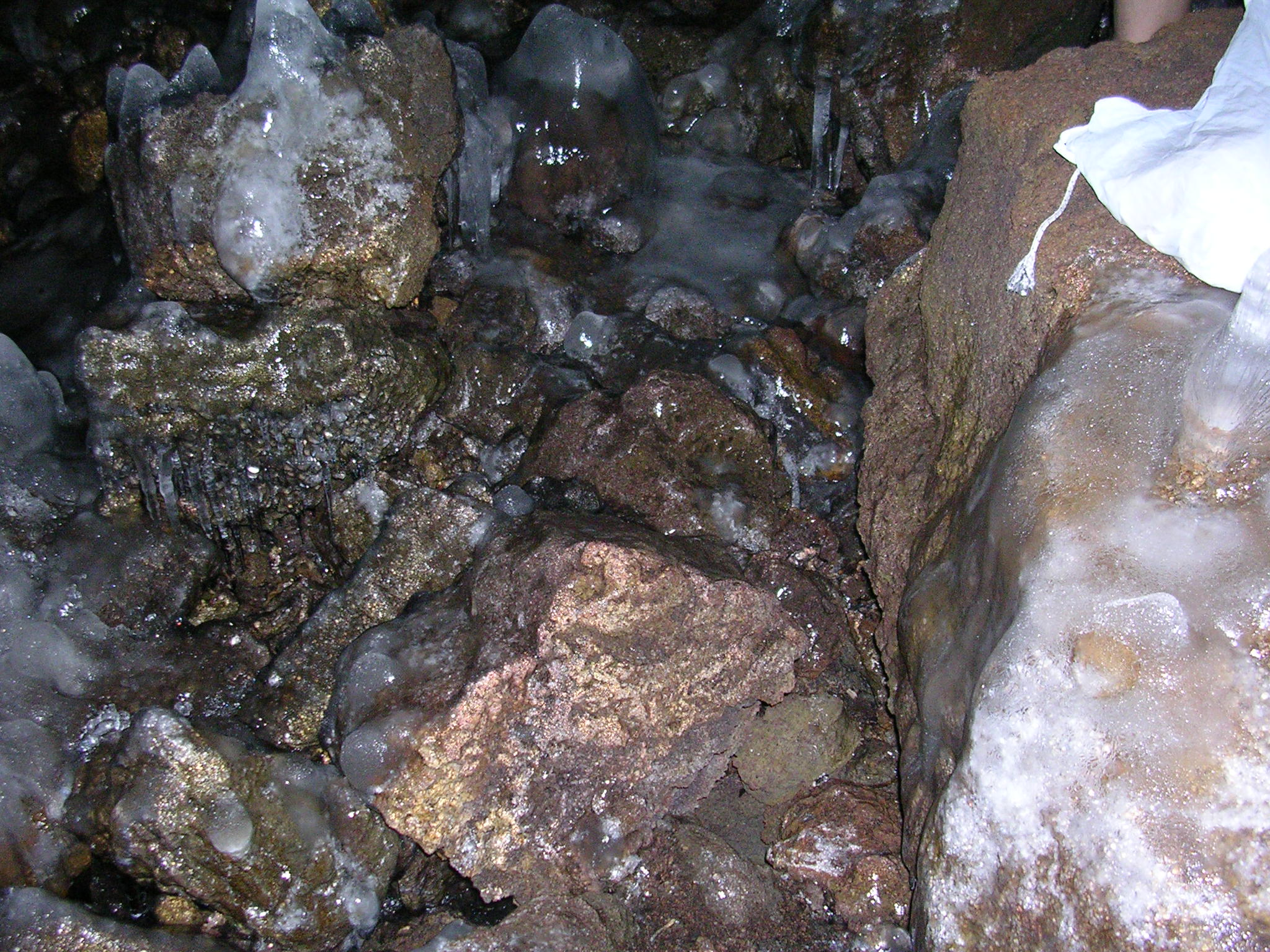
Ice on the floor of the cave

The cave contains about 1,500 cubic metres (53,000 cu ft) or 220–260 cubic metres (7,800–9,200 cu ft) of ice, which stacks on the cave floor and the walls. The ice is decorated with stalagmites, stalactites and ice columns. It fills the deeper parts of the cave. This body of ice has been called a glacier.

Grotta del Gelo is not the only cave containing ice on Mount Etna; the Abisso del Ghiaccio ("Abyss of Ice") which formed in 1947 also contains ice deposits but is not accessible. Ice also forms in the Grotta del Lago lava cave above Grotta del Gelo, but it thaws during summer and is thus not perennial.

=== Ice changes ===
The ice within the cave began to form during the Maunder Minimum, within two decades from the formation of the cave – probably during the second half of the 17th century. The ice mass in the cave increased until the 1980s and then declined due to the combined effect of climate change and an eruption in 1981 which occurred close to the cave and changed its temperature regime. The shape of the ice body has also changed over time; at some time after the 1990s a gallery formed in the ice, which then disappeared again. A phase of increased ice volume during and after 2014 has been linked to heavy snowfall.

== Use and scientific research ==
The cave was used as a source of water by farmers, who brought their animals there. Despite being locally known for centuries, it does not appear to have been documented systematically until the late 20th century. The first known written reference was to the Bocche de Gelo ("Mouth of Frost") in 1880. Beginning in the 1970s the cave became a tourist attraction for hikers, which led to increasing scientific interest and investigations from the 1980s onwards. Its interior was monitored and investigated from 1997 to 2000, and in 2013 a new and improved sensor network was installed by researchers to track the cave's atmospheric humidity and temperature.

It is probably the best known cave at Etna and of great volcano-speleological importance. Legends talk of the existence of a treasure at Grotta del Gelo; such legends are common for the volcanic caves at Etna.
