= Grotta Verde =

Cave in Italy

Coordinates: 40.5394°N 14.2208°E

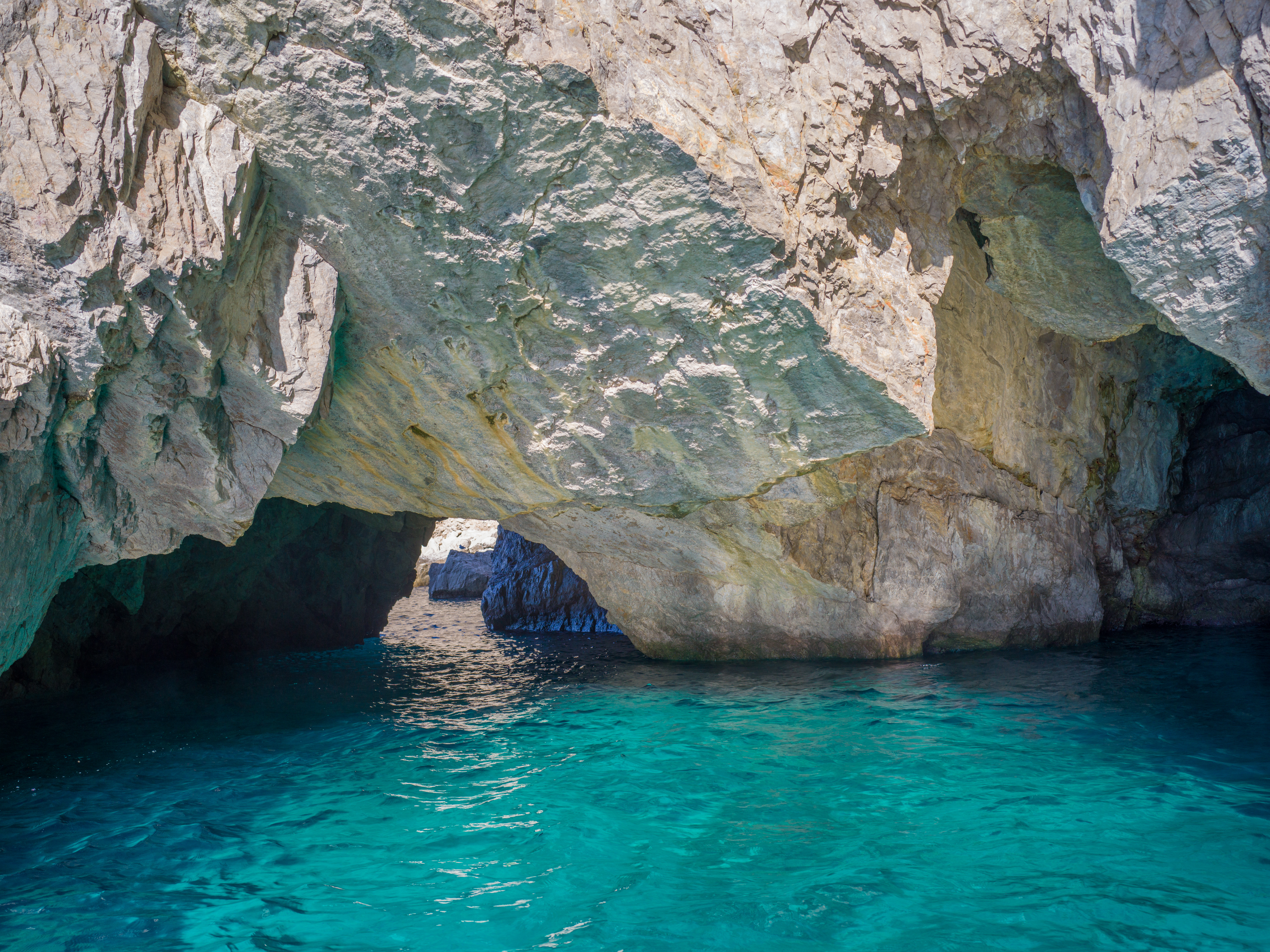
Grotta Verde a Capri.jpg

The Grotta Verde (Italian: "Green Cave") is a sea cave located on the island of Capri, southern Italy.

Near it, the coast is rugged, being fully exposed to sirocco gales. As wear and tear of the rocks is very rapid, former water line marks are not likely to be well preserved. Consequently, it is difficult to recognize any definite indication of former land levels. All that can be definitely stated is that it is a sea caves, the floor of which, formed when the land was higher, but is now submerged. The roof was eroded when the land was at a lower level. The green light upon the rocks stems to be a composite effect due to blue light reflected and transmitted from the water, playing upon the yellowish-hued sides and roof of the cave. It is best seen in the lower l'assaggio Verde, which may be travelled by boat on a calm day.
