= Borgio Verezzi =

- Comune
- Comune di Borgio Verezzi
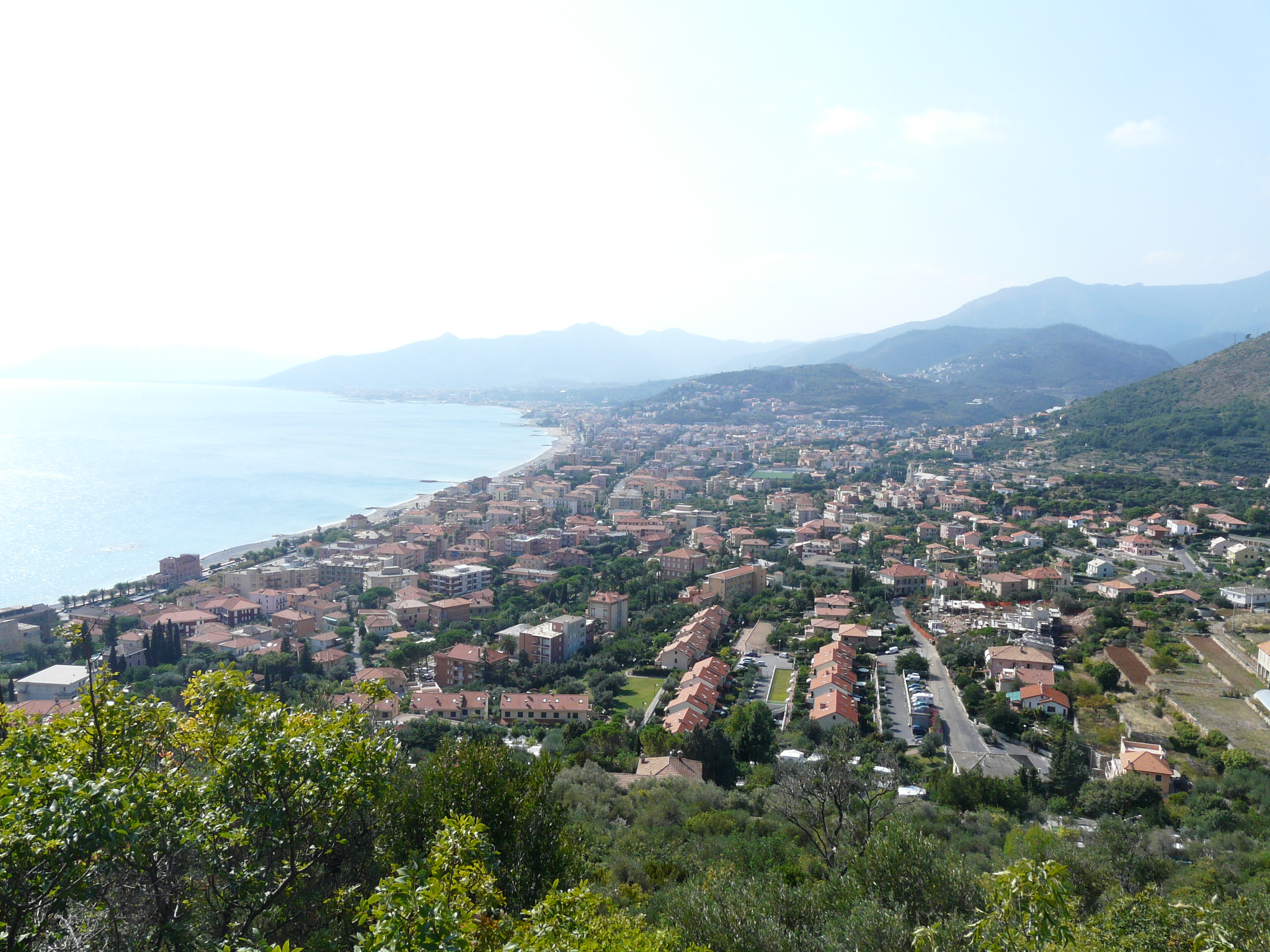
- View of Borgio and Pietra Ligure

- Coat of arms

- Location within Italy Location within Liguria
- Coordinates: 44°9′35.26″N 8°18′19.16″E
- Country: Italy
- Region: Liguria
- Province: Savona (SV)
- Frazioni: Borgio, Verezzi

Government
  - Mayor: Renato Dacquino

Area
  - Total: 2.9 km^{2} (1.1 sq mi)
- Elevation: 10 m (33 ft)

Population (30 April 2017)
  - Total: 2,197
  - Density: 760/km^{2} (2,000/sq mi)
- Demonym(s): Borgioverezzini, Borgesi, Verezzini
- Time zone: UTC+1 (CET)
  - Summer (DST): UTC+2 (CEST)
- Postal code: 17022
- Dialing code: 019
- Website: Official website

Borgio Verezzi (Ligurian: Bòrzi Veresso) is a comune (municipality) in the Province of Savona in the Italian region Liguria, located about 60 kilometres (37 mi) southwest of Genoa and about 20 kilometres (12 mi) southwest of Savona. It is one of I Borghi più belli d'Italia ("The most beautiful villages of Italy").

== Geography ==
The municipality of Borgio Verezzi is composed by the frazioni (subdivisions, mainly villages and hamlets) Borgio and Verezzi.

Borgio's old downtown stands atop a low hill, while the modern expansions cover the coastal plain and the foothills of the Caprazoppa plateau. Verezzi is divided into several very characteristic hamlets on the hillside, at some 200 metres (660 ft) above sea level. The main borough of Verezzi, Piazza, during summer hosts a theater festival of national relevance.

Borgio Verezzi borders the following municipalities: Finale Ligure, Pietra Ligure, and Tovo San Giacomo.

== Main sights ==
- Borgio Verezzi Caves
