= Pastena Caves =

Karst caves in Lazio, Italy

Grotte di Pastena (Pastena Caves)
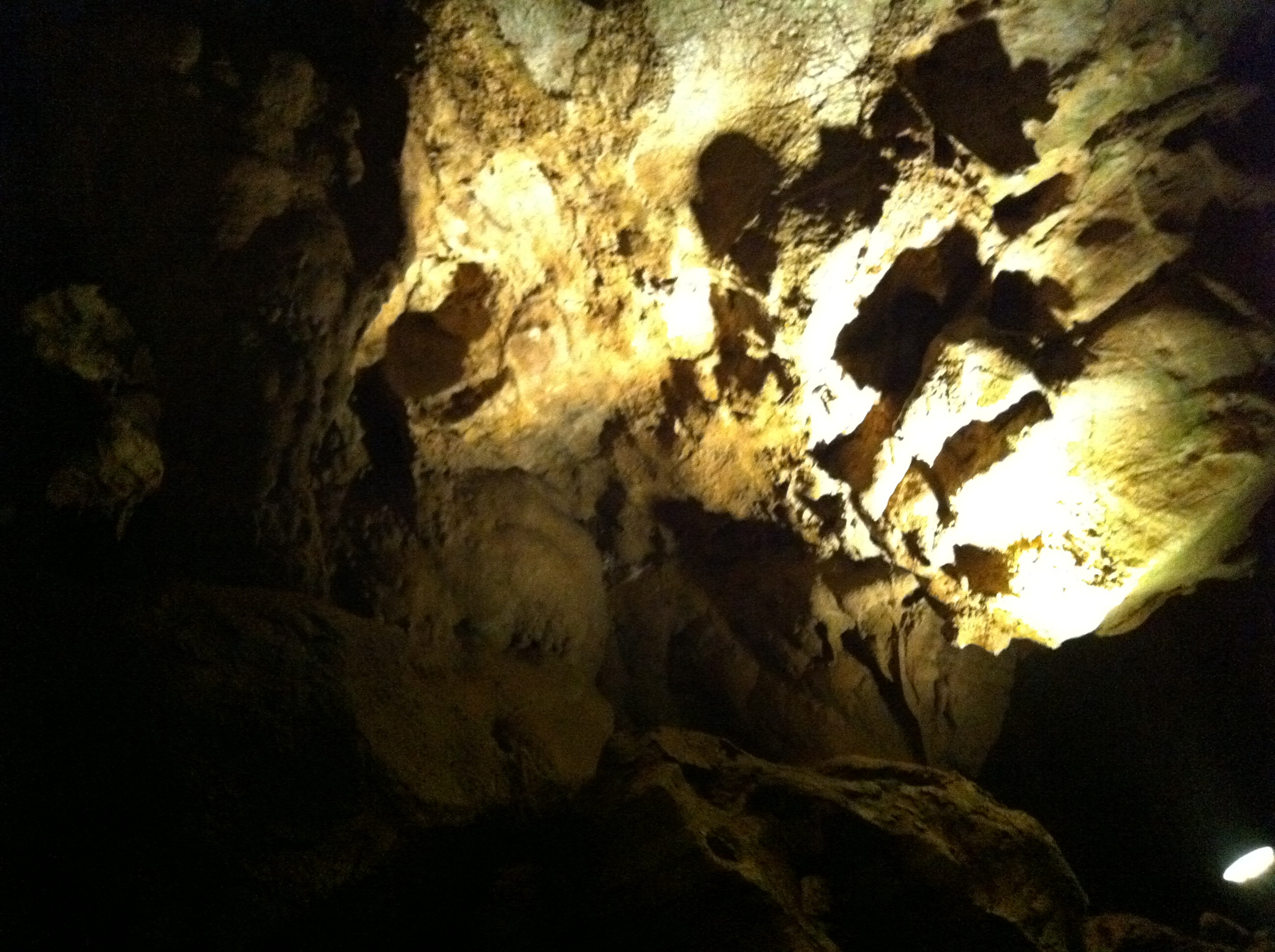

- Location within Italy
- Location: Pastena (FR, Lazio, Italy)
- Coordinates: 41°29′48.77″N 13°29′21.91″E
- Length: 900 m
- Elevation: 310 m
- Discovery: 1926
- Geology: Karst cave
- Entrances: 1
- Access: Public
- Show cave opened: yes
- Show cave length: ?
- Website: Official website

The Pastena Caves (Italian: Grotte di Pastena) are a karst cave system located in the municipality of Pastena, in the province of Frosinone, Lazio.

== Overview ==
The caves were discovered in 1926 by Carlo Franchetti and were opened for tourism one year later. They belong to the "Consorzio Grotte Pastena e Collepardo" . The site, situated 4.5 km out of the town of Pastena, on the road to Castro dei Volsci (close to the frazioni of Casanova-Cavatelle and Collevento), is divided into 2 sections: the "active" inferior and the "fossile" superior. The second one is so named due to the fact that the process of dripping (from stalactites to stalagmites) has not been active in several millennia.

== Cinema ==
A scene of Fantozzi va in pensione (Neri Parenti, 1988, with Paolo Villaggio), was filmed in the caves, even if in the fiction it was in Postojna Cave.

== See also ==
- Collepardo Caves
- List of caves
- List of caves in Italy
