= Grotta di Matromania =

Cave in Capri, Italy

Coordinates: 40°32′57″N 14°15′07″E

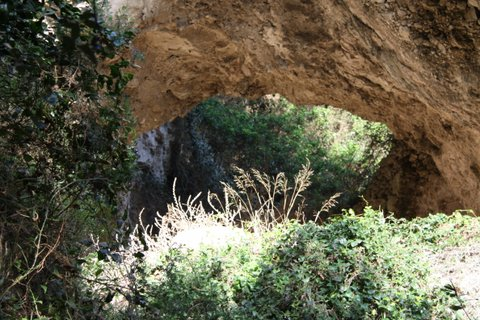
Grotta di Matromania.

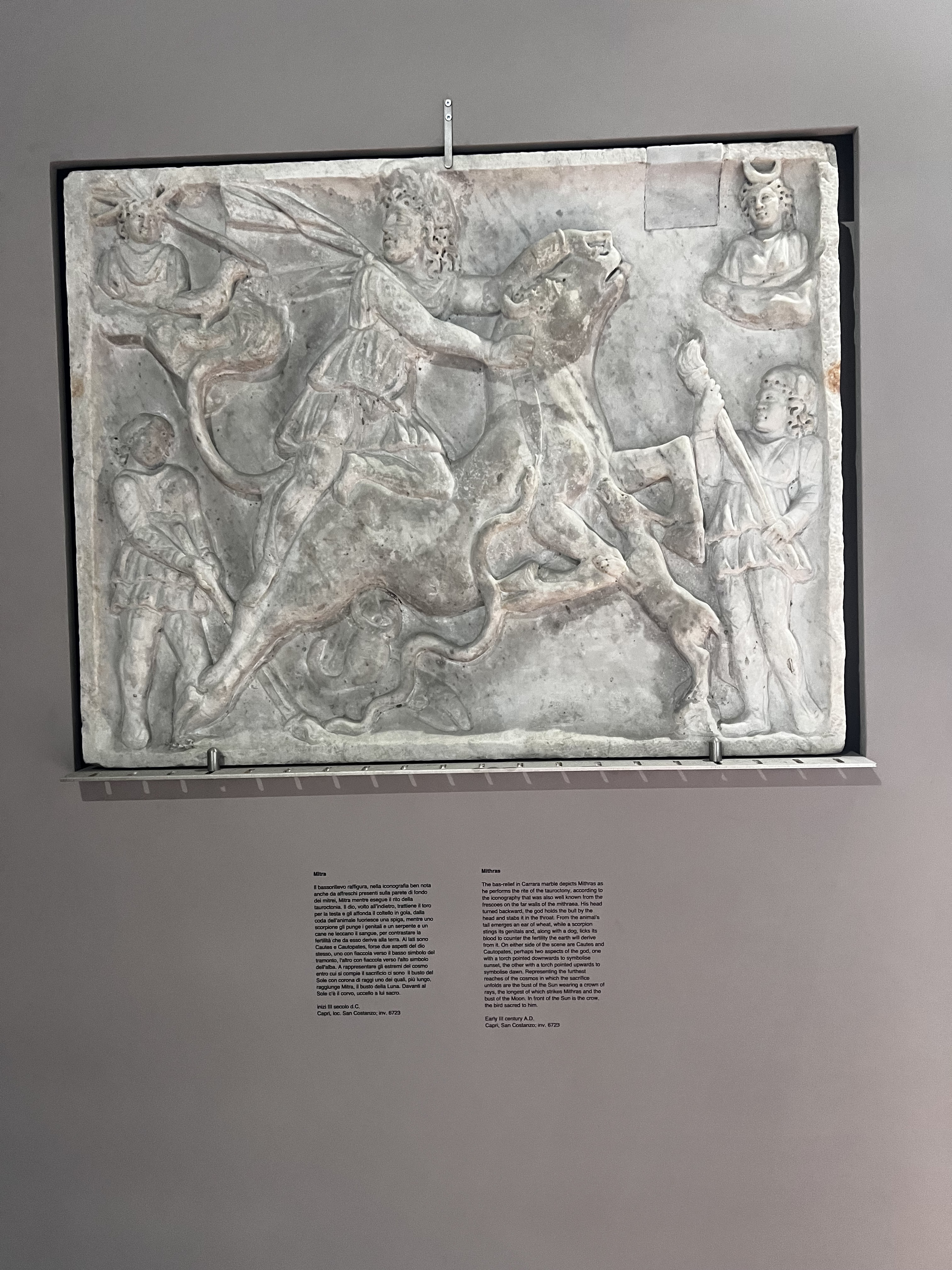
Mithras in the Naples Archaeological Museum; may have been found in the grotto.

The Grotta di Matromania (or Mitromania or Matrimonio) is a large, natural cave on the east coast of the island of Capri, Italy. It is located near the Arco Naturale. The cave is approximately 27 m long, 18 m wide, and 18 m high. It is connected with Mithras.
