= San Giovanni Incarico =

- Comune
- Comune di San Giovanni Incarico
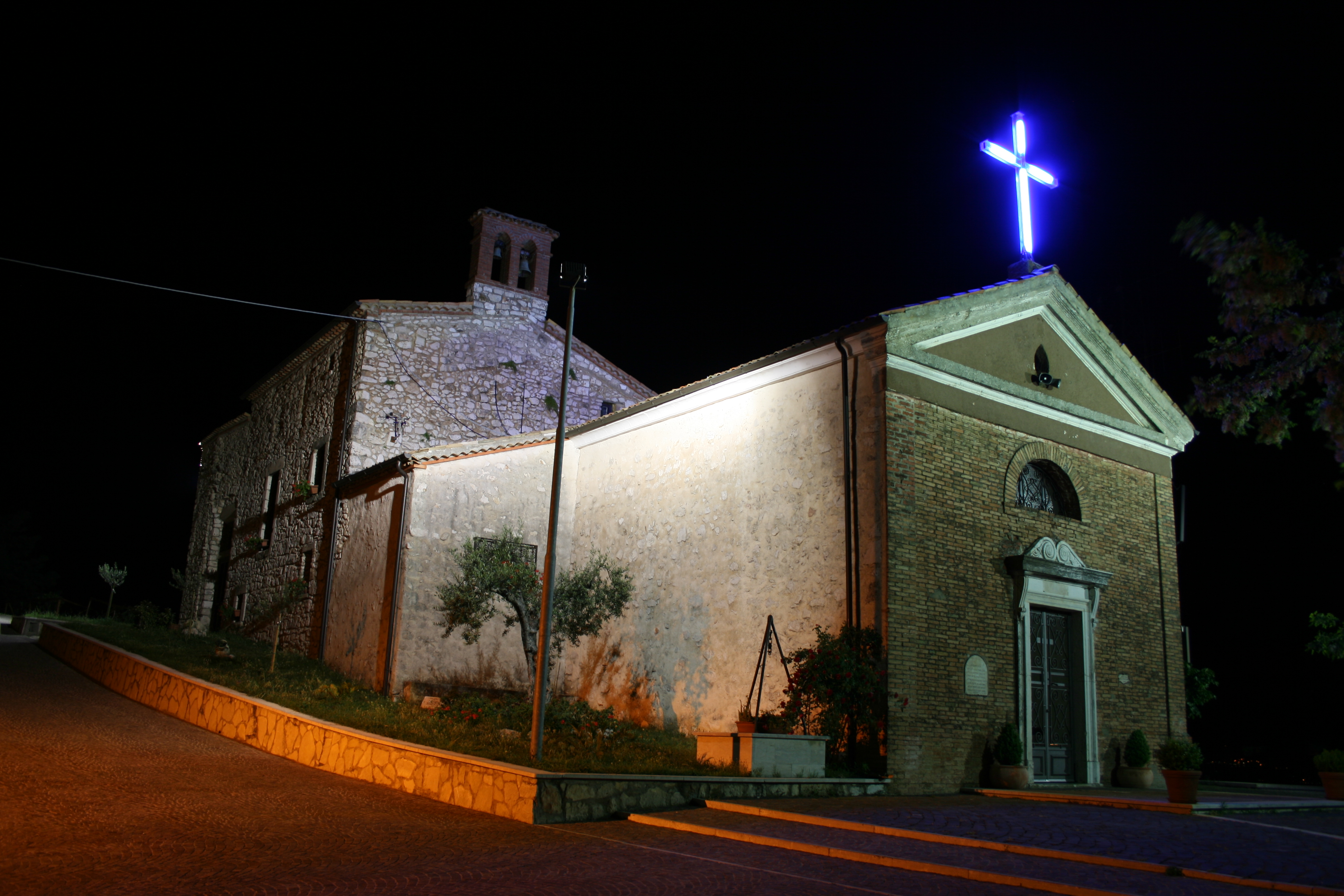
- Sanctuary of Madonna della Guardia.

- Location within Italy Location within Lazio
- Coordinates: 41°30′N 13°33′E
- Country: Italy
- Region: Lazio
- Province: Frosinone (FR)

Government
  - Mayor: Paolo Fallone

Area
  - Total: 24.71 km^{2} (9.54 sq mi)
- Elevation: 200 m (660 ft)

Population (30 November 2019)
  - Total: 3,225
  - Density: 130.5/km^{2} (338.0/sq mi)
- Demonym: Sangiovannesi
- Time zone: UTC+1 (CET)
  - Summer (DST): UTC+2 (CEST)
- Postal code: 03028
- Dialing code: 0776
- Website: Official website

San Giovanni Incarico is a comune (municipality) in the Province of Frosinone in the Italian region Lazio, located about 100 kilometres (62 miles) southeast of Rome and about 20 km (12 mi) southeast of Frosinone. It is the site of the ancient Latin town of Fabrateria Nova.

San Giovanni Incarico borders the following municipalities: Arce, Ceprano, Colfelice, Falvaterra, Pastena, Pico, Pontecorvo, Roccasecca.
