= Grotta della Bigonda =

Natural cave in Trento, Italy

- Vigondola
- Location within Italy
- Location: Italy
- Coordinates: 46°01′05″N 11°34′52″E
- Depth: 458 m

Grotta della Bigonda (The Bigonda cave (or Vigondola) is a natural cave located in Valsugana, near Selva in Grigno, in the province of Trento, on the right bank of the Brenta river.

The cave can be visited, but only accompanied by a guide (this can be addressed to the Grotte di Selva Group), only during the winter season (since it is less rainy) and only for its first kilometer (more than necessary special equipment is required).

== History ==
The entrance to the cave was discovered on March 28, 1952, during some marine research led by Eraldo Marighetti, which included the emptying of the pond for works in the aqueduct.

The first 2.9 kilometers were detected by the company Tridentine Alpinists (SAT) of Trento, coordinated by Antonio Galvagni and Gino Tomasi. Subsequently, the Grove Grassland Group of Grigno continued the exploration, achieving more than 30 km of development.

Access to the cave is located in the town of Ospedaletto, 458m asl, reachable from the village of Selva di Grigno in 30 minutes.

== Description ==
The cave is predominantly located on three levels (combined with different diacylases and wells), with a north–south orientation, thus reaching the territory of the plateau of the Seven Communes; is the third Italian cavity for its vastness. The cave, also excavated in dolomite, is rich in stalactites, stalagmites and hypogeous fauna (18 different species of animals, including some absolutely unique in world taxonomy) and currently it has been measured a maximum difference between -108 and +350 meters, or about 450 meters.

The interior of the cave varies according to the season, or rather rainfall, during the slightly rainy seasons lakes and siphons are formed, making this cave a cave rich in water (at a temperature of 3 °C). Twenty-five ponds, with high boots, or a canoe and 21 siphon lakes, have been counted, which can only be exceeded by using special diving equipment. In the heavily rainy seasons, however, the cave is lurking completely and is no longer accessible.
