= Pastena =

- Comune
- Comune di Pastena
- Coat of arms

- Pastena within the Province of Frosinone

- Location within Italy Location within Lazio
- Coordinates: 41°28′N 13°29′E
- Country: Italy
- Region: Lazio
- Province: Frosinone (FR)

Government
  - Mayor: Arturo Gnesi

Area
  - Total: 42.16 km^{2} (16.28 sq mi)
- Elevation: 318 m (1,043 ft)

Population (28 February 2017)
  - Total: 1,447
  - Density: 34.32/km^{2} (88.89/sq mi)
- Demonym: Pastenesi
- Time zone: UTC+1 (CET)
  - Summer (DST): UTC+2 (CEST)
- Postal code: 03020
- Dialing code: 0776
- Patron saint: SS. Croce
- Saint day: May 3
- Website: Official website

Pastena is a comune (municipality) in the Province of Frosinone in the Italian region of Lazio, located about 90 kilometres (56 mi) southeast of Rome and about 20 kilometres (12 mi) southeast of Frosinone.

== Geography ==
Pastena borders the following municipalities: Castro dei Volsci, Falvaterra, Lenola, Pico, San Giovanni Incarico.

== Main sights ==
- Pastena Caves
