= San Demetrio ne' Vestini =

- Comune
- Comune di San Demetrio ne' Vestini
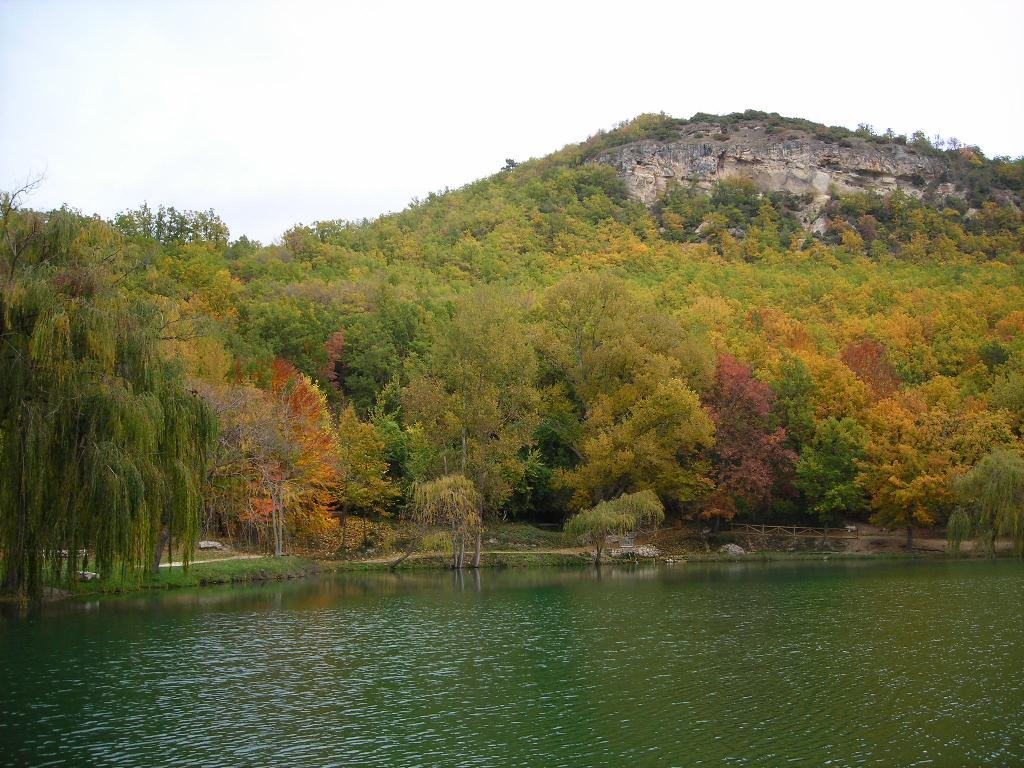

- Location within Italy Location within Abruzzo
- Coordinates: 42°17′26″N 13°33′22″E
- Country: Italy
- Region: Abruzzo
- Province: L'Aquila (AQ)
- Frazioni: Cardabello, Cardamone, Cavantoni, Collarano, Colle, San Giovanni, Stiffe, Villagrande

Area
  - Total: 16.33 km^{2} (6.31 sq mi)
- Elevation: 662 m (2,172 ft)

Population (1 January 2007)
  - Total: 1,755
  - Density: 107.5/km^{2} (278.3/sq mi)
- Demonym: Sandemetrani
- Time zone: UTC+1 (CET)
  - Summer (DST): UTC+2 (CEST)
- Postal code: 67028
- Dialing code: 0862
- ISTAT code: 066087
- Patron saint: San Demetrio
- Saint day: 26 October
- Website: Official website

San Demetrio ne'Vestini is a comune and town in the Province of L'Aquila in the Abruzzo region of Italy

In the 18th century, San Demetrio ne' Vestini was ruled by Duke Filippo Arcamone. His son Vincenzo later became the last duke of the town and died with no heirs.

== Transport ==
San Demetrio has a station on the Terni–Sulmona railway, with trains to L'Aquila and Sulmona.
