= Enego =

- Comune
- Comune di Enego
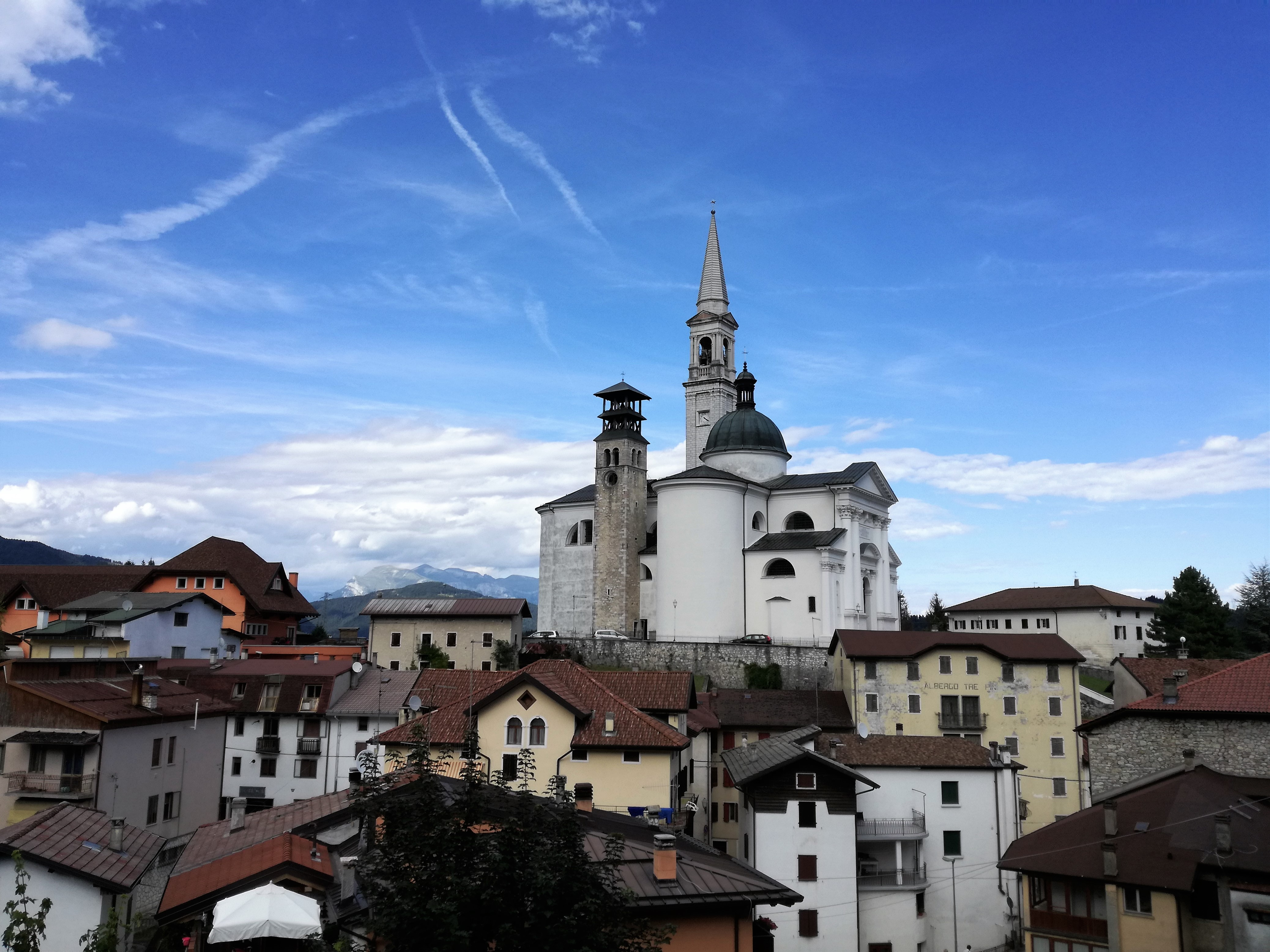
- Cathedral of Santa Giustina.

- Coat of arms

- Location within Italy Location within Veneto
- Coordinates: 45°56′N 11°43′E
- Country: Italy
- Region: Veneto
- Province: Vicenza (VI)
- Frazioni: Coldarco, Coste, Dori, Enego 2000, Fosse, Marcesina, Piovega, Stoner, Valdicina, Valdifabbro, Valgoda

Government
  - Mayor: Marco Frison (2023)

Area
  - Total: 52.61 km^{2} (20.31 sq mi)
- Elevation: 800 m (2,600 ft)

Population (31 July 2017)
  - Total: 1,663
  - Density: 31.61/km^{2} (81.87/sq mi)
- Demonym: Eneghesi
- Time zone: UTC+1 (CET)
  - Summer (DST): UTC+2 (CEST)
- Postal code: 36052
- Dialing code: 0424
- Patron saint: St. Justina
- Saint day: 7 October
- Website: Official website

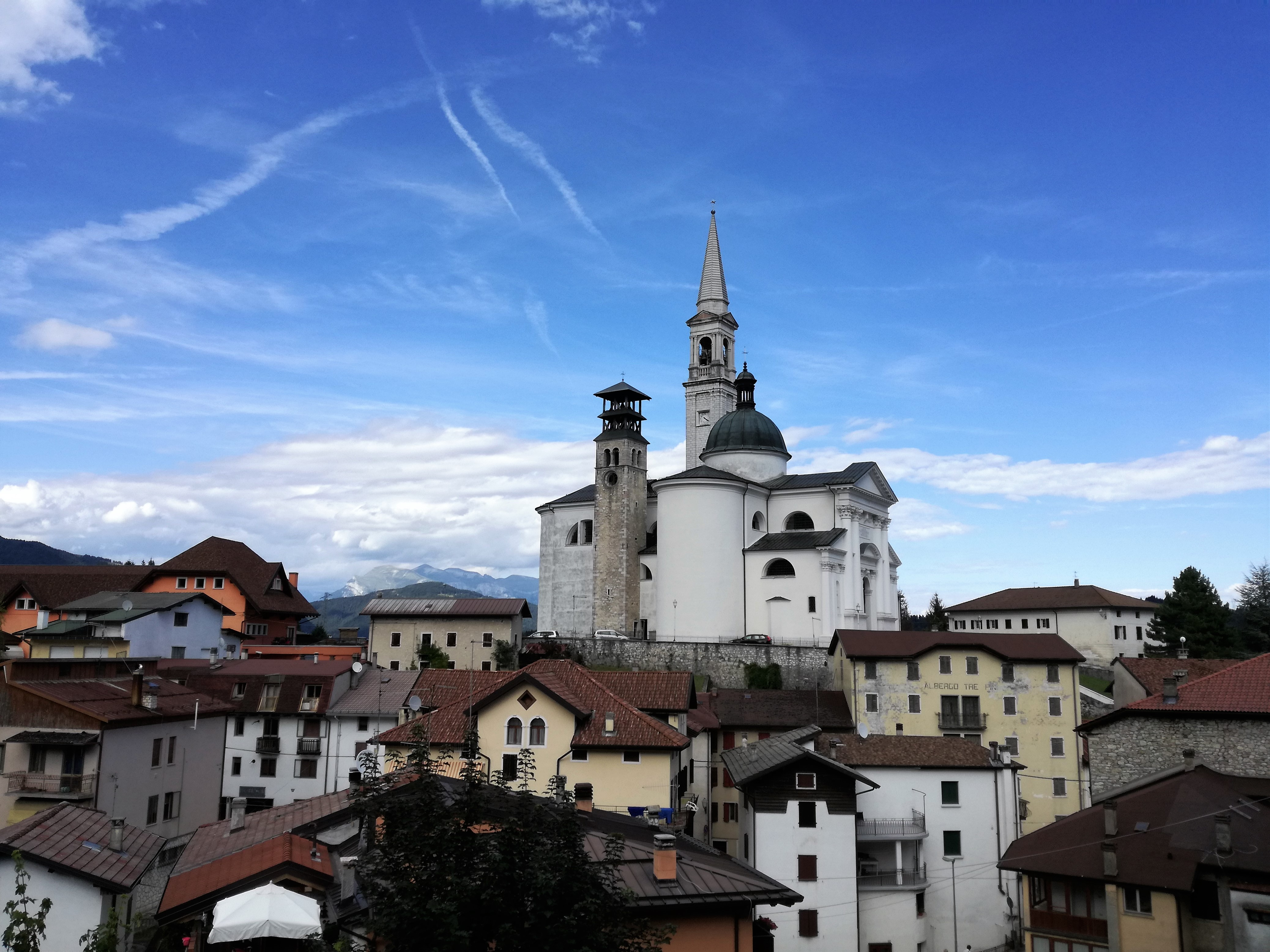
Duomo of Enego.

Enego (Cimbrian: Ghenebe) is a town and comune in the province of Vicenza, Veneto, north-eastern Italy. It is west of SS47 state road.

It was once the seat of a castle used by the Ezzelino family, now demolished. The Ponte Valgadena is the highest viaduct in Italy, the third in Europe, with a length of 282 metres (925 ft) and a height of 175 metres (574 ft). On the bridge is possible to practice Bungee jumping.
