= Duchy of Alvito =

Italian polity

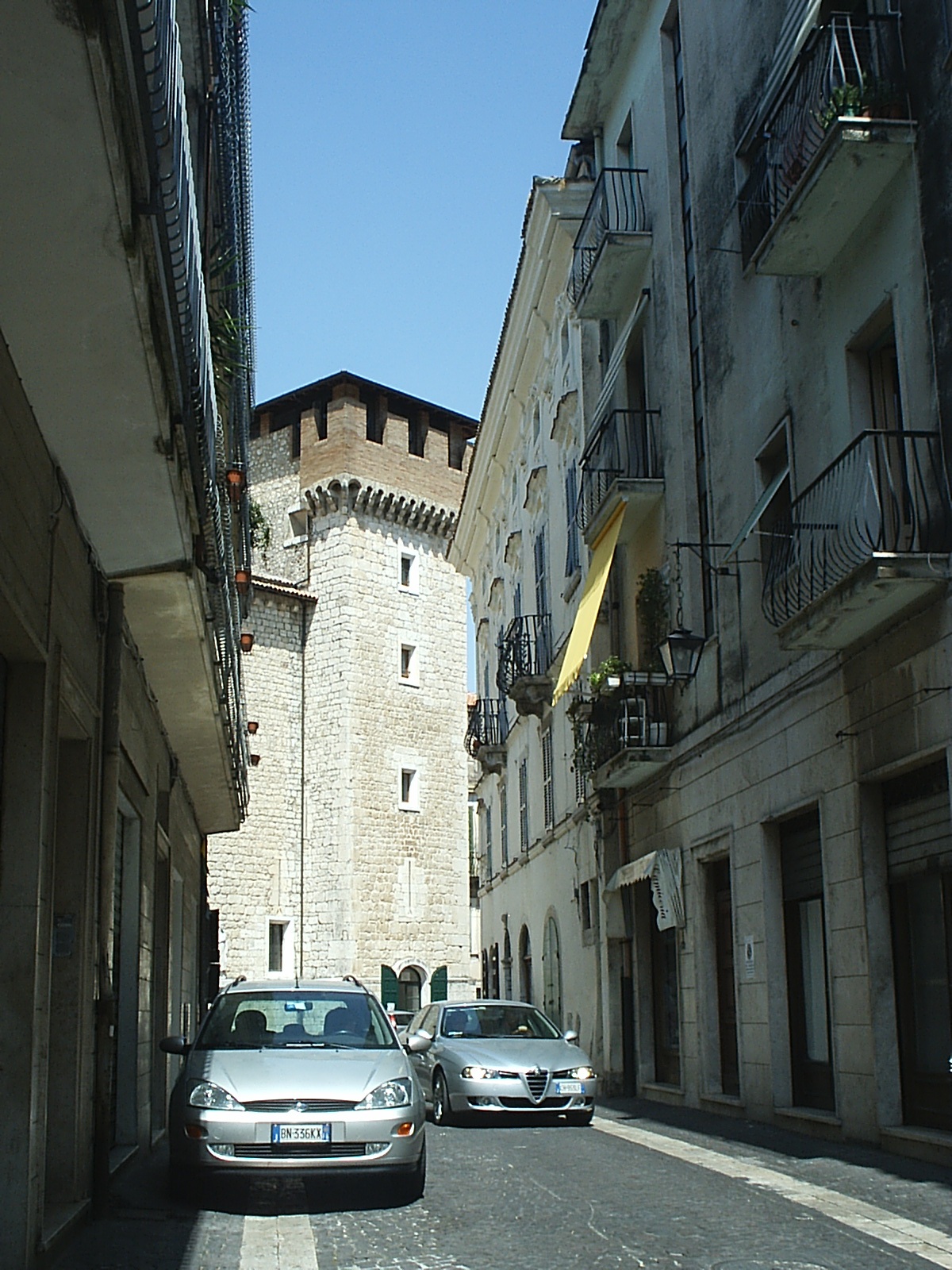
Ducal palace of the Cantelmo in Atina, showing fortifications

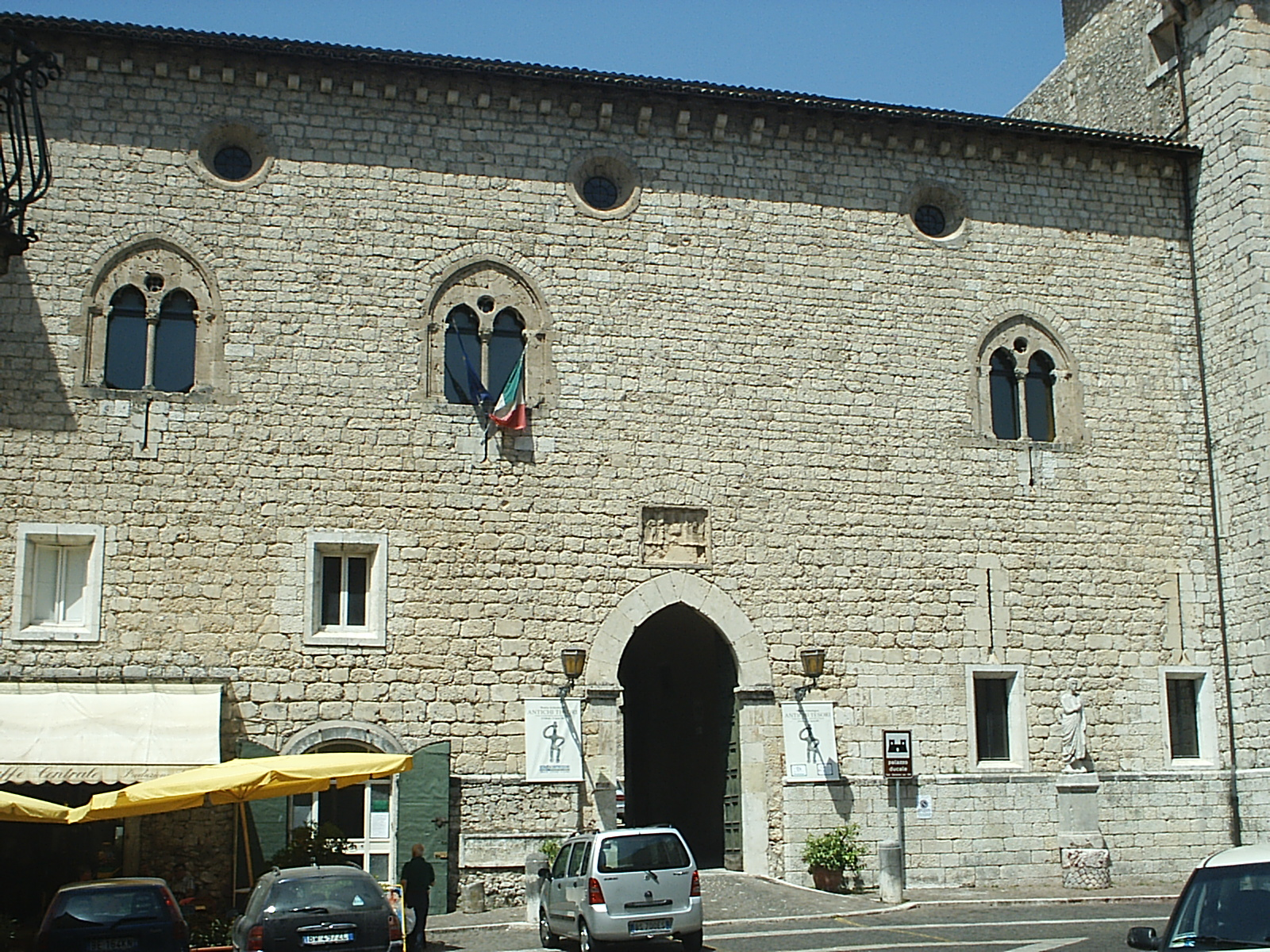
Front façade of the ducal palace in Atina

The Duchy of Alvito was a fiefdom of the Kingdom of Naples, in southern Italy.

== Rule of the Cantelmo ==
The Cantelmo family, of French origins, arrived in Italy in the 13th century around the time the Angevins conquered Naples (1266). From the Angevins, the Cantelmo received several castles and fiefs around Alvito in what is now the Valcomino, dominated by the numerous fiefs of the powerful regional monasteries (such as Monte Cassino and San Vincenzo al Volturno), as well as by the rival family of the Counts of Aquino. Rostaino and his successors tried unsuccessfully to extend their control over the whole region in the 14th century. They sided with Queen Joan II of Naples but were defeated by the troops of Charles of Durazzo. In a document of 1384, Giacomo IV is mentioned as "lord of the lands of Alvito".

During the turmoil caused by the succession of Ladislaus of Naples, the Cantelmo sided with his rival, Louis II of Anjou. Rostainuccio ("little Rostaino") was defeated and captured by Jacopo Orsini at Pereto in Abruzzo in 1369, and Alvito was granted by Ladislaus to Andrea Tomacelli, brother of the Count of Sora and of Pope Boniface IX. Alvito was soon returned to the Cantelmo, and Giacomo V, Rostainuccio's son, was the first ruler of Alvito to bear the title of count. He likely obtained the title as a dowry from his wife, Elisabetta d'Aquino. After Giacomo's death the county was expanded by his son Antonio, who acquired Gallinaro, Fontechiari, Arce, Popoli (this from his brother Francesco, who had died heirless), and other lands in the Abruzzo and Valcomino. Antonio's rule was troubled by the turmoil and succession crises of the Kingdom of Naples in the early 15th century, and he lost his lands repeatedly. His son Nicolò was able to establish his rule more firmly by backing the successful Alfonso V of Aragon in his conquests of 1443. Alfonso created Nicolò Duke of Sora, and in this capacity he stripped his brother Onofrio of the County of Popoli in Abruzzo. Nicolò also obtained the position of royal counselor in 1452 and, just before his death, his title was raised to Duke of Alvito.

Nicolò's son Piergiampaolo inherited Sora and Alvito, while another son, Piergiovanni, inherited Popoli. Piergiampaolo soon annexed his brother's Abruzzese lands and, after siding against the new king, Ferdinand I, in the revolt of 1460, captured the territories of Montecassino, Arce, and the fiefs of the Colonna in Abruzzo. He also took part in the sieges of Sulmona and L'Aquila, but was in turn besieged and defeated by Napoleone Orsini at Sora. As a result, he was forced to cede Sora, Arpino, Casalvieri, Isola del Liri, and Fontana Liri to the Papal States in 1463. His duchy was downgraded to a county, the title being assigned to Piergiovanni. At the same time, Alvito and Sora were given the right to mint cavalli (a type of coin). Piergiampaolo organized a second plot against Ferdinand, but was again defeated and had to abandon hopes in returning to Alvito. Exiled to France, he returned with the invading army of Charles VIII of France during the War of 1494–95. With his brother, Sigismondo II of Sora, he re-conquered most of his lands. He was able to resist the Neapolitans after the French retreat, but in 1496 Sora fell to Frederick I of Naples, followed in 1496 by Alvito, captured by general Gonzalo de Córdoba. This put an end to the Cantelmo rule.

== Royal demesne ==
Isabella de Requesens, regent of Alvito for her son Ferrante. Portrait by Raphael and Giulio Romano, c. 1518, now in the Louvre.

The Valcomino became a royal demesne. In 1497 Gioffre Borgia, son of Pope Alexander VI, was invested with the title Count of Alvito. During the War of 1499–1504, when Louis XII of France tried to conquer Naples, Gioffre sided with the French, but captured by Prospero Colonna he sided with the Spanish, which caused a rebellion in Alvito. He sent the condottiero Fabrizio Colonna to stabilise his lands, to which he finally returned in 1504. After the death of his wife, Sancha of Aragon, he lost the rights to the county, which were given in 1507 to the Spanish general Pietro Navarro.

In 1515, after Pietro had embraced the French cause, Alvito was conferred on the viceroy Ramón (Raimondo) de Cardona, who did not live there but rather administered it through a governor. The county was inherited by Ramón's son Folch (or Ferrante), under the regency of his mother, Isabella de Requesens. She was able to exploit the ongoing Franco-Spanish wars to acquire the nearby Duchy of Somma. Ferrante was succeeded in 1571 by his sons Loise (1572–74) and Antonio (1574–92), who let Alvito decline under ruthless local governors. Despite the acquisition of the Duchy of Sessa, in 1592, the county was ceded to Matteo di Caua for 100,000 ducats. It was sold a second time to the Milanese nobleman Matteo Taverna, who acquired it with money from Tolomeo II Gallio, nephew and namesake of the Cardinal Tolomeo Gallio. In the end Tolomeo obtained full rule in Alvito, receiving the title of Duke in 1606 from Philip III of Spain.

The Gallio family held the duchy until 1806, when feudalism was suppressed in the Kingdom of Naples.

== See also ==
- Duchy of Sora
