= Gallinaro =

- Comune
- Comune di Gallinaro
- Gallinaro within the Province of Frosinone

- Location within Italy Location within Lazio
- Coordinates: 41°40′N 13°48′E
- Country: Italy
- Region: Lazio
- Province: Frosinone (FR)

Government
  - Mayor: Mario Piselli

Area
  - Total: 17.74 km^{2} (6.85 sq mi)
- Elevation: 558 m (1,831 ft)

Population (30 November 2019)
  - Total: 1,255
  - Density: 70.74/km^{2} (183.2/sq mi)
- Demonym: Gallinaresi
- Time zone: UTC+1 (CET)
  - Summer (DST): UTC+2 (CEST)
- Postal code: 03040
- Dialing code: 0776
- Patron saint: St. Gerard
- Website: Official website

Gallinaro is a comune (municipality) in the Province of Frosinone in the Italian Lazio region. It is about 129 kilometres (80 mi) south of Rome and about 118 kilometres (73 mi) north of Naples.

== Geography ==
Gallinaro is located in the Comino Valley and is crossed by Rio Mollo, a tributary river of Melfa. It borders the municipalities of Alvito, Atina, Picinisco, San Donato Val di Comino and Settefrati. The town is 129 kilometres (80 mi) from Rome and about 118 kilometres (73 mi) north of Naples.

== History ==
The town was first mentioned in 1023, probably founded by the counts of Sora. In 1067 it became property of the counts of Aquino. The sanctuary of St. Gerard was built in the 13th century.

== Main sights ==
- Old town
- St. Gerard Sanctuary (12th century)
- Church of St. John (14th century)
- Child Jesus of Gallinaro
- CHIESA SANTA MESIA ELIA NARDELLI

== People ==
- Paolo Tullio (1949-2015), chef, restaurateur, critic
