= Monte Cornacchia (Abruzzi Apennines) =

Mountain in Italy

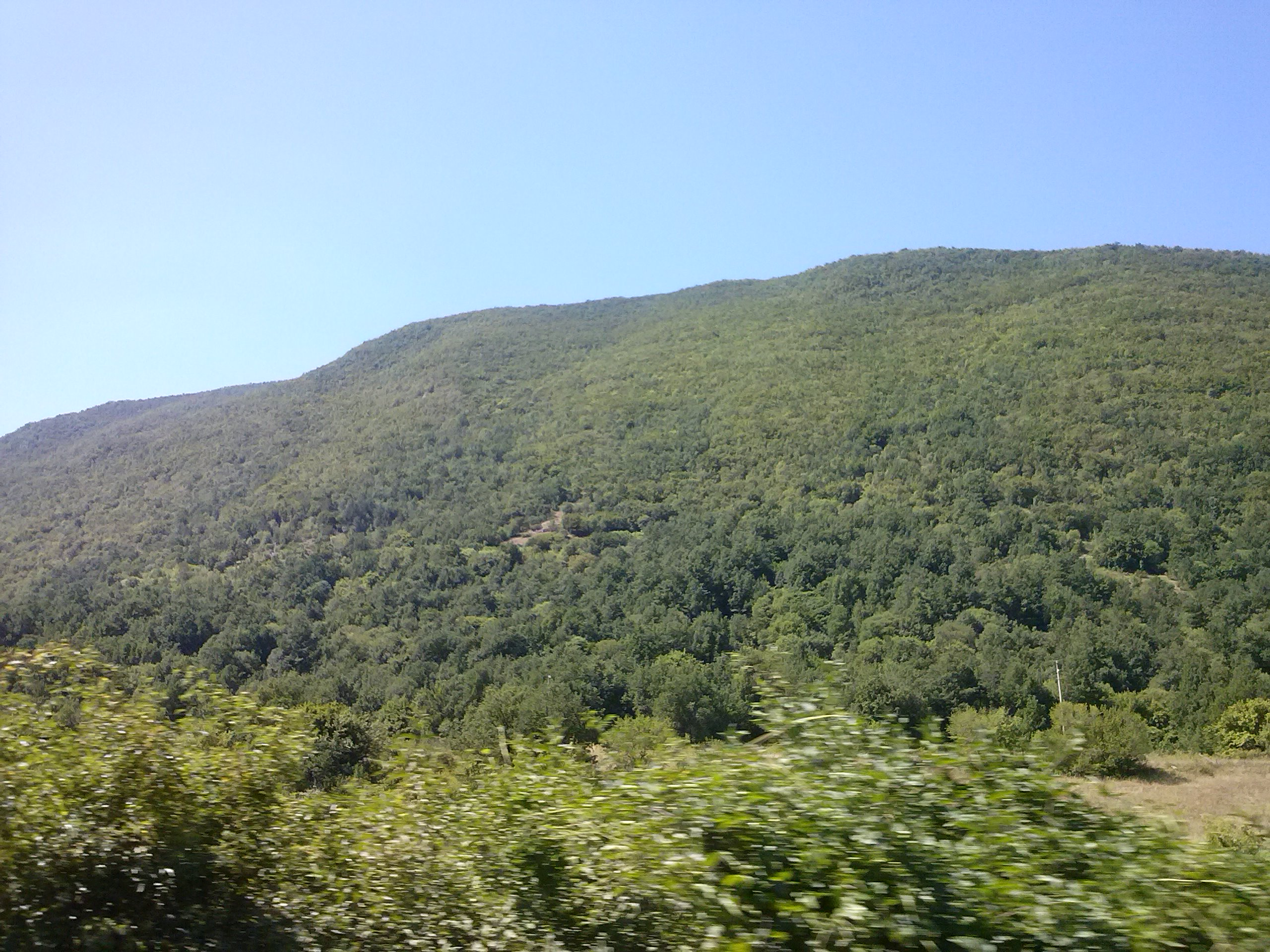

Highest point
- Elevation: 2,010 m (6,590 ft)
- Prominence: 483 m (1,585 ft)
- Isolation: 11.01 km (6.84 mi)
- Coordinates: 42°12′54″N 13°22′54″E

Geography
- Location within Italy
- Location: Lazio and Abruzzo, Italy
- Parent range: Serra Lunga (Abruzzi Apennines)

Monte Cornacchia is a mountain of the Serra Lunga mountain range in the Abruzzi Apennines.

== Description ==
It is located on the border between Lazio and Abruzzo, between the provinces of Frosinone and L'Aquila, between the municipalities of Pescosolido (FR), where the summit is located (2003 m) and those of Villavallelonga (AQ) and Balsorano (AQ). Around 1900 m, there are the peaks of Mount La Brecciosa and Mount Croce.

The Lacerno stream originates on the southern side and flows into the Liri near Sora.
