= List of city nicknames in Italy =

Many cities and towns in Italy are popularly known by various nicknames. This list compiles the aliases, sobriquets and slogans that cities in Italy are known by (or have been known by historically), officially and unofficially.

== List ==
- Agrigento: la città dei templi (The city of temples)
- Alatri: la Città dei Ciclopi (the City of Cyclopes)
- Anagni: la città dei papi (The city of Popes)
- Ancona: la città dorica (The doric city) / la porta d'Oriente (the gate for the Orient)
- Andria: la città dei 3 campanili (the city of 3 towerbells) / La federiciana
- Arpino: la città di Cicerone (the city of Cicero)
- Atina: la città di Saturno (the city of Saturn)
- Bari: la città del Levante (the city of Levant)
- Belluno: la città splendente (the shining city)
- Bergamo: la città dei Mille (the city of the Thousand)
- Bologna: la dotta, la rossa, la grassa (the learned, the red, the fat)
- Bolzano: la porta delle Dolomiti (the gate of the Dolomites)
- Brescia: la leonessa d'Italia (the lioness of Italy)
- Campoli Appennino: la città dell'Orso e del Tartufo (the city of Bear and Truffle)
- Catania: La figlia nera dell'Etna (the black daughter of Mount Etna) / la Milano del Sud (the Milano of South)
- Catanzaro: la città dei tre colli (the city of 3 hills)
- Cesena: la città dei tre papi (the city of 3 Popes)
- Civita di Bagnoregio: la città che muore (the dying city)
- Codogno: la Piccola Mela (the Little Apple)
- Como: La città lariana (the larian city) / Il forno d'Italia (The furnace of Italy)
- Cortina d'Ampezzo: la regina delle Dolomiti (the queen of Dolomites)
- Cosenza: la città dei Bruzi (the city of Bruttians) / l'Atene della Calabria (the Athens of Calabria)
- Cremona: la città delle tre T: torrone, Torrazzo e tette (the city with 3 T: torrone, Torrazzo, and tits) / la città dei violini (the city of violins)
- Cuneo: la città dei sette assedi (the city of the 7 sieges)
- Ferrara: la città delle biciclette (the city of bikes)
- Florence: la culla del Rinascimento (the cradle of the Renaissance) / la nuova Atene (the New Athens)/ l'Atene d'Italia (the Italian Athens) / la gentile (the kind)
- Genoa: la dominante (the dominant), la superba (the superb).
- Giugliano in Campania: la città della mela annurca (the city of annurca apples) / La città della fiaba (the city of fairytale)
- Gorizia: la città giardino (the garden city) / la Nizza austriaca (the Austrian Nice)
- Gubbio la città dei matti (the city of fools)
- Jesolo: la Miami italiana (the Italian Miami)
- La Spezia: la porta di Sion (the Zion Gate)
- Lecce: la Firenze del Sud (the Florence of South)
- Lecco: la città del ferro (the city of iron)
- Lucca: la pantera (the panther)
- Mantua: la città dei tre laghi (the city with 3 lakes) / la città dei Gonzaga (the city of the House of Gonzaga)
- Matera: la città dei Sassi (the city of stones)
- Messina: la porta della Sicilia (the gate of Sicily)
- Milan: la possente (the mighty) / la città meneghina (the city of Meneghino / la capitale della moda (the Fashion capital)
- Mirandola: la città dei Pico (the city of Pico della Mirandola's family)
- Modena: la città canarina (the Canarian city)
- Moena: la fata delle Dolomiti (the fairy of Dolomites)
- Naples: la città partenopea (the city of Parthenope) / la città del sole (the city of Sun) / la città delle 500 cupole (the city of 500 domes)
- Ostuni: la città bianca (the white city)
- Padua: la città del Santo (the city of the Saint) / La città dei tre senza: il Santo senza nome, il prato senza erba e il caffè senza porte (the city of 3 without: the Saint without name, the lawn without grass and the café without doors)
- Palermo: la splendida (the wonderful)
- Parma: la petite capitale (the small capital) / la città della gastronomia (the city of gastronomy) / la città del prosciutto e del Parmigiano (the city of prosciutto di Parma and Parmigiano-Reggiano)
- Patrica: il borgo Presepe (the Crib village)
- Pavia: la città delle 100 torri (the city of 100 towers)
- Perugia: la vetusta (the old)
- Pesaro: città della bicicletta (Bike City) / Città della musica (Music city)
- Pescara: la città d'annunziana (the city of Gabriele D'Annunzio)
- Piacenza: la primogenita d'Italia (the eldest of Italy)
- Pisa: la gloriosa (the glorious)
- Potenza: la città verticale (the vertical city) / la città delle 100 scale (the city of 100 stairs)
- Ragusa: la città dei ponti (the city of bridges)
- Ravenna: la capitale dei mosaici (the capital of mosaics)
- Reggio Emilia: la città del Tricolore (the city of the tricolour flag)
- Riccione: la perla verde dell'Adriatico (the green pearl of Adriatic sea)
- Rome: la città eterna (the eternal city) / L'Urbe / Caput mundi
- Sacile: il giardino della Serenissima (the garden of the Most Serene republic of Venice)
- Sanremo: la città dei fiori (the city of flowers)
- Sesto San Giovanni: la Stalingrado d'Italia (the Stalingrad of Italy)
- Siena: la città del Palio (the city of the Palio) / la Pompei medievale (the medieval Pompeii)
- Taranto: la città dei due mari (the city with 2 seas)
- Tortorici: la città delle campane (the city of bells)
- Treviso: la città dipinta (the painted city) / la città del radicchio e del tiramisù (the city of radicchio and tiramisù)
- Trieste: la mitteleuropea (the Central European city) / La città dei caffè (the city of Cafes)
- Turin: la valorosa (the valiant) / la città magica (the magic city) / la regale (the royal)
- Udine: la città del Tiepolo (the city of Tiepolo)
- Vasto: Atene degli Abruzzi (Athens of Abruzzi)
- Venice: la serenissima (the most serene) / La dominante (the dominant) / La regina dell'Adriatico (the queen of Adriatic Sea), la sposa del mare (the bride of the sea)
- Verona: la scaligera (the Scaliger city) / La città degli innamorati (the city of lovers)
- Vicenza: la città del Palladio (the city of Palladio), la città dei magnagati (the city of cat eaters)

== See also ==
- Lists of city nicknames
