= San Donato Val di Comino =

- Comune
- Comune di San Donato Val di Comino
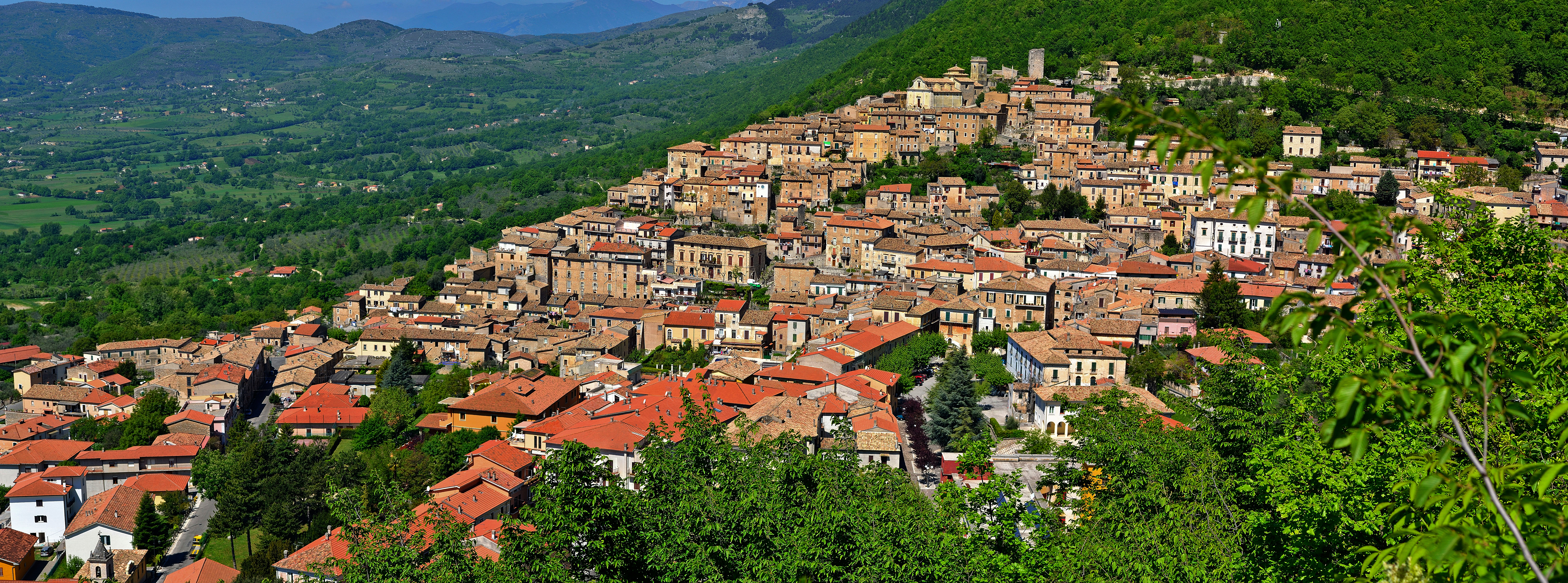
- Panoramic view of San Donato Val di Comino

- Location within Italy Location within Lazio
- Coordinates: 41°42′N 13°49′E
- Country: Italy
- Region: Lazio
- Province: Frosinone (FR)

Government
  - Mayor: Enrico Pittiglio

Area
  - Total: 35.8 km^{2} (13.8 sq mi)
- Elevation: 700 m (2,300 ft)

Population (28 February 2017)
  - Total: 2,061
  - Density: 57.6/km^{2} (149/sq mi)
- Demonym: Sandonatesi
- Time zone: UTC+1 (CET)
  - Summer (DST): UTC+2 (CEST)
- Postal code: 03046
- Dialing code: 0776
- Patron saint: Saint Donatus of Arezzo
- Saint day: 7 August
- Website: www.comune.sandonatovaldicomino.fr.it

San Donato Val di Comino (locally Sande Denate) is a comune (municipality) in the Province of Frosinone in the Italian region Lazio, located in the Comino Valley about 110 kilometres (68 mi) east of Rome and about 40 kilometres (25 mi) east of Frosinone.

San Donato Val di Comino borders the following municipalities: Alvito, Gallinaro, Opi, Pescasseroli, Settefrati.

== History ==
According to scholars, the history of San Donato Val Di Comino dates back to the Romans and the region had been dominated by Romans, Lombards and various noble families and royalties over the centuries. The town is known for its ancient houses and monuments, built on the slopes of the surrounding mountains.

Origins of San Donato Val di Comino are Samnite: the town was called Cominium and was devastated by the Romans in 293 BC. The Lombards took over its territory in the 8th century AC. The actual village was born after the Battle of Garigliano in 915: the populations of Cassinate, Beneventano and Itri began to move towards the mountains between Lazio and Abruzzo. This is how the first villages began to spring up, such as Sant'Urbano, from whose disintegration San Donato Val Di Comino was born in 1200, perched around the Church of San Domato.

During World War 2, San Donato Val Comino was the site of a residential internment policy called confino libero. Unlike the internment camp at Ferramonti in Calabria and deportation camps, towns involved in confino libero had Jews and other prisoners of the fascist state living and "renting" space in villagers' homes or hotel. During the implementation of the racial laws, San Donato Val Comino became the destination for "stateless" Jews (whose ID documentation was no longer valid in occupied Europe) and political dissidents. In San Donato Val Comino more than two dozen people, mostly foreign nationals residing in Florence, were forced to find residence and to check in to the police twice a day. The internment ended when on April 6, 1944, German soldiers took 16 of those interned out of town and to Auschwitz. The rest of the 28 escaped into the mountains. The youngest internee, age 2, hid with the Cardarelli family until her parents who had escaped a month or two earlier came to retrieve her.

The historian Anna Pizzuti published "Vite Di Carta: Storie di Ebrei Stranieri Internati dal Fascismo" (English: "Paper Lives: Stories of Foreign Jews Interned by Fascism) in 2010. She has an extensive database online with details of about the Italian internment camps and the victims. In 2010, a collection of scholarly essays was edited by Domenico Cedrone, Gli Ebrei Internati A San Donato 1940-1944 Accoglienza e Soldiarieta.

One of the 30 internees who were forced to live in San Donato during the war, was Margerite (Grete) Bloch, a friend of Franz Kafka. According to Reiner Stach's Kafka biography, she was most likely not the mother of Kafka's son, though she made claims to such. In Chapter 26 of The Decisive Years (published in 2013), there is evidence of her friendship with Kafka's fiancee Felice Bauer, on whose behalf Grete Bloch intervened when Kafka broke their engagement. At that time, the letters between Kafka and his fiancee mention Bloch being in some unknown trouble. Later during the war, Grete Bloch, as did all the internees, worked hard to find ways to leave Italy. She wrote letters to old friends of Franz Kafka in Switzerland. In those letters she says she had a son by Kafka though the son died as a child. Grete Bloch was martyred in Auschwitz along with 14 other internees from San Donato Val Comino.

The historian Max Brod located a message sent by the British Red Cross on May 16, 1945, according to which M.M. was clubbed to death by a German soldier, shortly after being detained. bingo Dario

Other prominent people interned in San Donato Val Comino were the silent film actress Grete Berger, the Czech publisher Clara Babab in Buchsbaum, and Dr. Tenenbaum and his wife Urusla Tenenbaum and child, the stage director Enrico Lewi and his wife the performer Gabrielle Kaiser and their two children.

== Sister cities ==
San Donato is currently twinned with:

- Newton, United States
