= Campoli Appennino =

- Comune
- Comune di Campoli Appennino
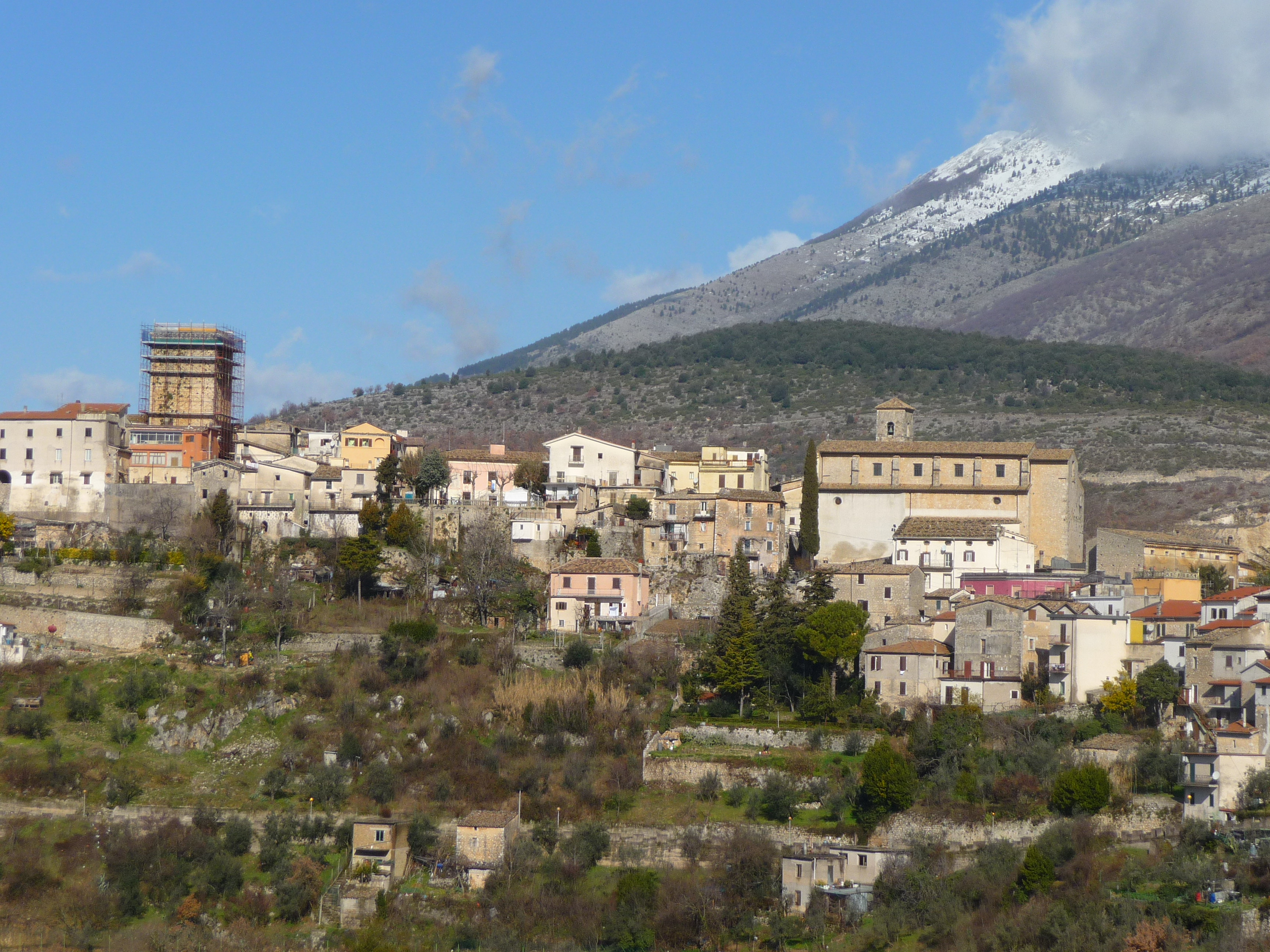
- View of Campoli Appennino

- Coat of arms

- Location within Italy Location within Lazio
- Coordinates: 41°44′N 13°41′E
- Country: Italy
- Region: Lazio
- Province: Frosinone (FR)

Government
  - Mayor: Pietro Annunzio Mazzone

Area
  - Total: 33.4 km^{2} (12.9 sq mi)
- Elevation: 650 m (2,130 ft)

Population (28 February 2017)
  - Total: 1,690
  - Density: 50.6/km^{2} (131/sq mi)
- Demonym: Campolesi
- Time zone: UTC+1 (CET)
  - Summer (DST): UTC+2 (CEST)
- Postal code: 03030
- Dialing code: 0776
- Patron saint: St. Pancratius
- Saint day: May 12
- Website: Official website

Campoli Appennino (Campanian: Campere) is a comune (municipality) in the Province of Frosinone in the Italian region Lazio, located about 100 kilometres (62 mi) east of Rome and about 30 kilometres (19 mi) northeast of Frosinone.

Campoli Appennino borders the following municipalities: Alvito, Broccostella, Pescasseroli, Pescosolido, Posta Fibreno, Sora, Villavallelonga. It is home to a medieval tower, 25 metres (82 ft) high, a series of walls, and the "Aqueduct of Nero".

== See also ==
- National Park of Abruzzo, Lazio e Molise
