= Pescosolido =

- Comune
- Comune di Pescosolido
- Location within Italy Location within Lazio
- Coordinates: 41°44′N 13°39′E
- Country: Italy
- Region: Lazio
- Province: Frosinone (FR)

Government
  - Mayor: Giuseppe Cioffi

Area
  - Total: 44.9 km^{2} (17.3 sq mi)
- Elevation: 630 m (2,070 ft)

Population (31 March 2018)
  - Total: 1,516
  - Density: 33.8/km^{2} (87.4/sq mi)
- Demonym: Pescosolidani
- Time zone: UTC+1 (CET)
  - Summer (DST): UTC+2 (CEST)
- Postal code: 03030
- Dialing code: 0776
- Patron saint: St. John the Baptist
- Website: Official website

Pescosolido (Italian pronunciation: [pɛskoˈsɔːlido, - pe-]; locally Pesc'tësòllërë) is a comune (municipality) in the Province of Frosinone in the Italian region Lazio, located about 100 kilometres (62 mi) east of Rome and about 30 kilometres (19 mi) northeast of Frosinone.

Pescosolido borders the following municipalities: Balsorano, Campoli Appennino, Sora, Villavallelonga.

== Main sights ==
- Church of Saint John the Baptist and Saint John the Evangelist
- Church of Saint Roch (with a stone façade)
- Church of San Pantalon
- Church of Our Lady of Pompeii (forcella)
- Church of Our Lady of Snows
- Lacerno Valley
- Parco Nazionale d'Abruzzo, Lazio e Molise
- Palazzo Cianfarani Isola
- Town House Palace
