= Posta Fibreno =

- Comune
- Comune di Posta Fibreno
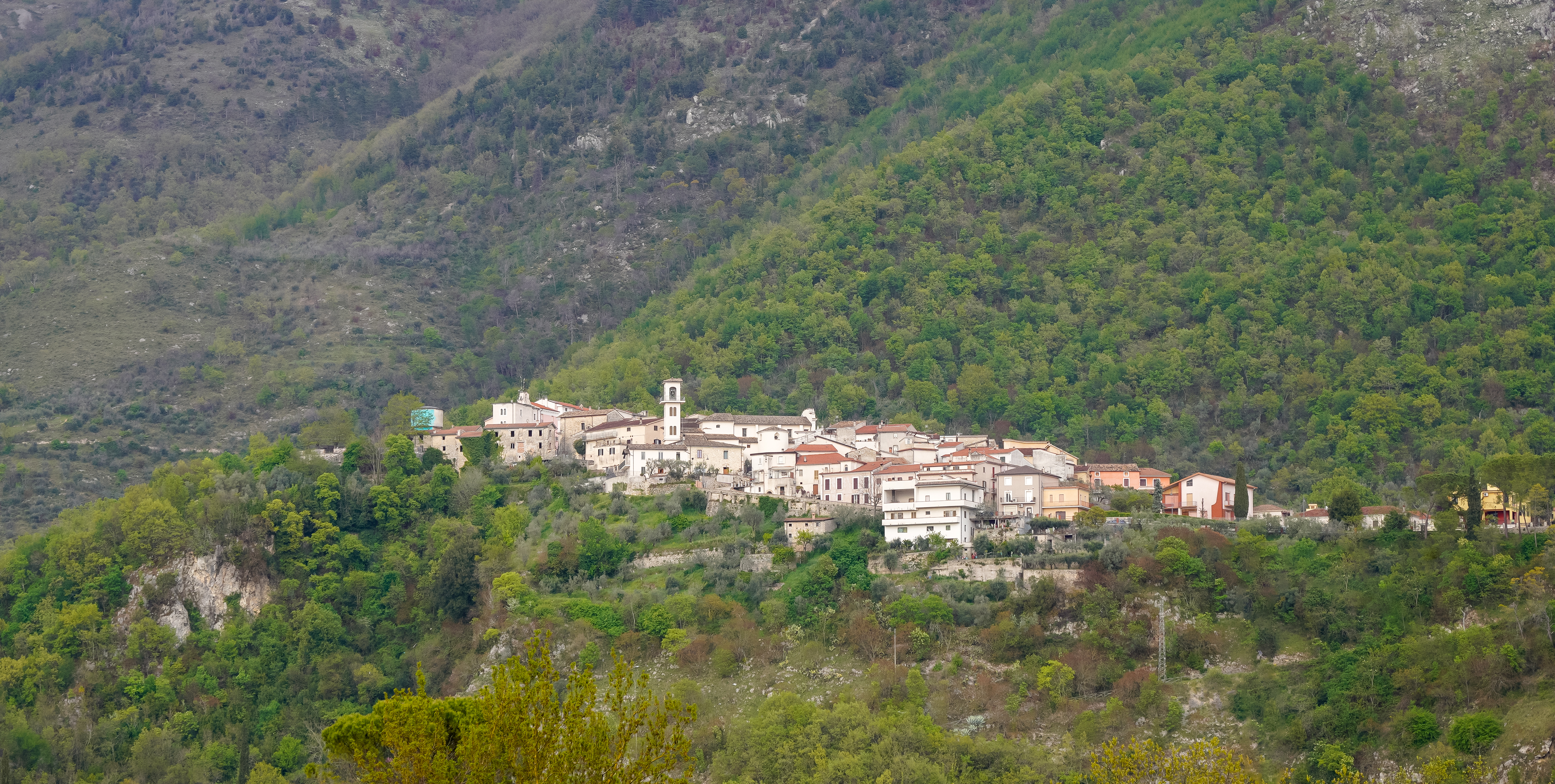
- View from the lake

- Location within Italy Location within Lazio
- Coordinates: 41°42′N 13°42′E
- Country: Italy
- Region: Lazio
- Province: Frosinone (FR)

Government
  - Mayor: Adamo Pantano

Area
  - Total: 9.8 km^{2} (3.8 sq mi)
- Elevation: 430 m (1,410 ft)

Population (31 July 2017)
  - Total: 1,104
  - Density: 110/km^{2} (290/sq mi)
- Demonym: Postesi
- Time zone: UTC+1 (CET)
  - Summer (DST): UTC+2 (CEST)
- Postal code: 03030
- Dialing code: 0776
- Website: Official website

Posta Fibreno (locally La Posta) is a comune (municipality) in the Province of Frosinone in the Italian region Lazio, located about 100 kilometres (62 mi) east of Rome and about 30 kilometres (19 mi) east of Frosinone.

Posta Fibreno borders the following municipalities: Alvito, Broccostella, Campoli Appennino, Fontechiari, Vicalvi.

In 1927, following the reorganization of provincial circumscriptions established by royal decree no. 1 2 January 1927, by the will of the fascist government, when the province of Frosinone was established, Posta Fibreno, as a locality of Vicalvi, passed from Caserta province to that of Frosinone. In 1957, with the law of 5 March 1957 n. 91, left the territory of Vicalvi.

== Main sights ==
- Lake of Posta Fibreno
- Natural reserve Lago di Posta Fibreno
