= Palazzo Panicali =

Coordinates: 41.6898°N 13.7412°E

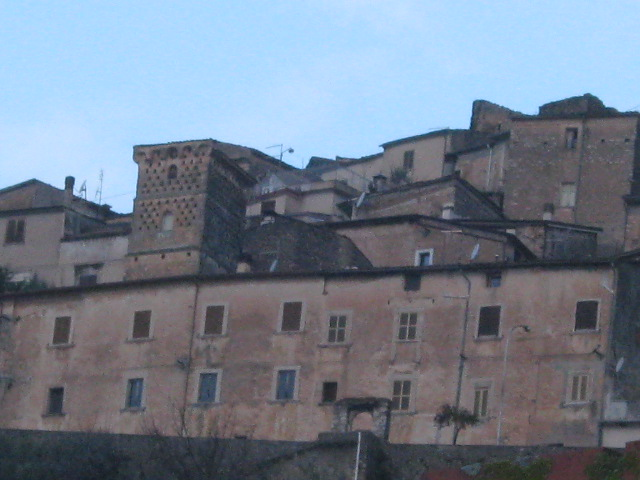
- Palazzo Panicali in Alvito
- Interactive map of the Palazzo Panicali area

General information
- Location: Italy

The Palazzo Panicali, also known as Palazzo Panicali al Peschio, to distinguish it from the Elvino-Panicali palace in lower Alvito, is a monumental building in Peschio, a hamlet of Alvito, Lazio, Italy, enclosed within the medieval city walls.

== History ==
The building takes its name from the original owners, the Panicali family, which was among the most prominent in Alvito and was almost extinct by the 18th century, whose ancestors included the humanist Giampaolo Flavio.

The palace dates back to the 17th century and was built on a previous structure in Peschio, a village included within the city walls of Alvito, halfway between Castello and lower Alvito, near a rocky spur (pesculum) from which it took its name.

The Panicali family abandoned it during the 18th century, having meanwhile erected another, more imposing palace in the lower part of Alvito, which would later be named Palazzo Ferrante, from the Abruzzo lineage in which it would be extinct.

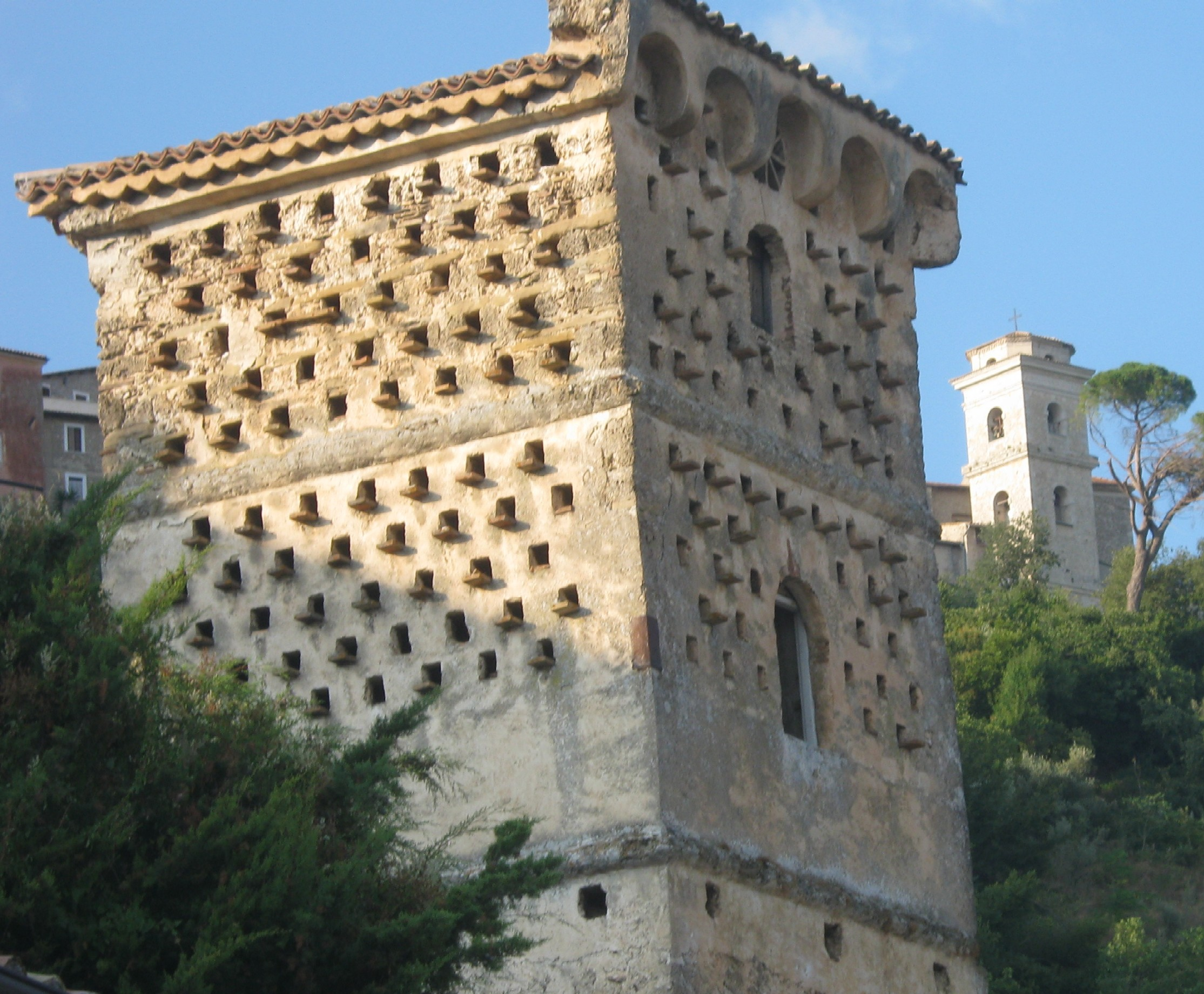
West dovecote tower, detail

== Architecture ==
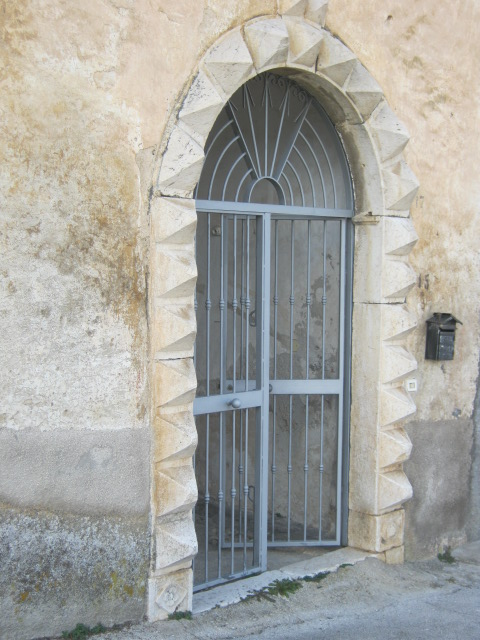
Diamond-point rusticated portal

It is one of the most famous buildings in the city, whose main facade, originally built on the ancient road that led halfway up to the castle, still extends completely over the paved road that crosses the village of Peschio. There it is adorned with the only example in the Valle di Comino of a diamond-point rusticated portal, a valuable artistic element.

Two dovecote towers enrich the architectural complex and make it immediately recognizable in the city's urban system: the west tower is structured in three orders and, in the upper two, it features loopholes decorated with protruding corbels.

== Bibliography ==
- Recchia A.P., La Val di Comino, in «Storia della città: rivista internazionale di storia urbana e territoriale», n° 23, 1982, p. 90–91.
