= Casalvieri =

- Comune
- Comune di Casalvieri
- Location within Italy Location within Lazio
- Coordinates: 41°38′N 13°43′E
- Country: Italy
- Region: Lazio
- Province: Frosinone (FR)
- Frazioni: Purgatorio, Roselli

Government
  - Mayor: Franco Moscone

Area
  - Total: 27.27 km^{2} (10.53 sq mi)
- Elevation: 380 m (1,250 ft)

Population (30 December 2020)
  - Total: 2,383
  - Density: 87.39/km^{2} (226.3/sq mi)
- Demonym: Casalvierani
- Time zone: UTC+1 (CET)
  - Summer (DST): UTC+2 (CEST)
- Postal code: 03034
- Dialing code: 0776
- Patron saint: St. Honorius
- Saint day: May 31
- Website: Official website

Casalvieri (Campanian: Casaluere) is a comune (municipality) in the Province of Frosinone in the Italian region Lazio, located about 110 kilometres (68 mi) southeast of Rome and about 30 kilometres (19 mi) east of Frosinone.

Casalvieri borders the following municipalities: Alvito, Arpino, Atina, Casalattico, Fontechiari, Vicalvi.
