= Ducal Palace of Atina =

Coordinates: 41°37′11″N 13°48′01″E

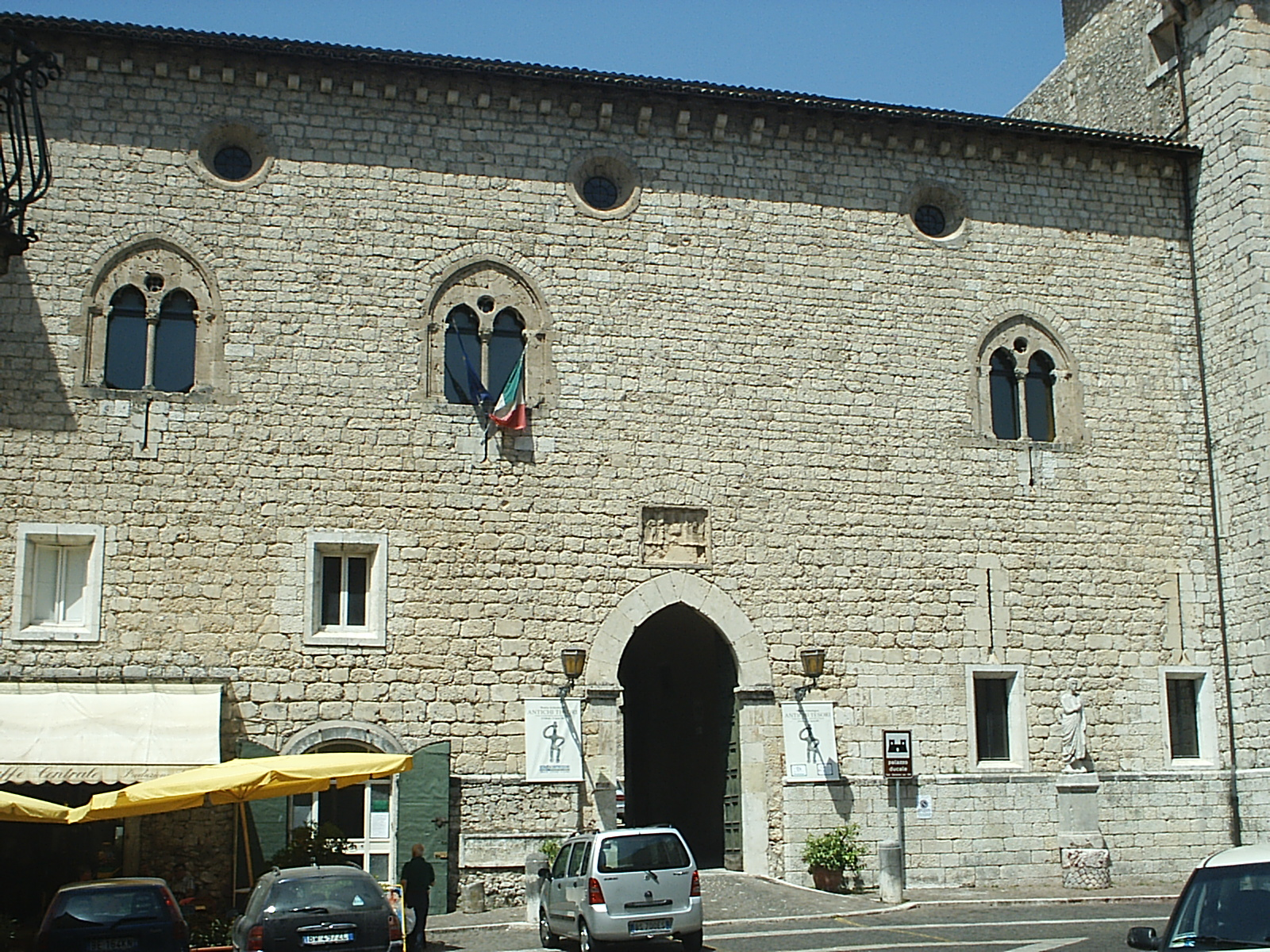
Facade of Palace

The Ducal Palace or Palazzo Ducale of Atina is a 14th-century gothic-style, government palace in Piazza Saturno, in the center of the town of Atina, province of Rieti, region of Lazio, Italy.

== History and description ==
The town of Atina was leveled by an earthquake on 9 September 1349. Reconstruction was patronized by the aristocratic Cantelmo family. The town was rebuilt at the original site of the Ancient Roman town, and a hamlet built by the Counts of Aquino. The Duke of Alvito, Rostaino Cantelmo, decided to build the fortress-like palace in the highest point in the town. Construction lasted over two centuries. In the meantime, feudal owner ship of the town underwent many changes. In 1595, the palace was bought by the Gallio family. But by the 18th century it became property of the Paniccia family of Vicalvi. In 1870, it was sold to the town council. For a period it was used as a prison. In the early 1900s, the palace housed a theatre and hall for meeting, modified by Giuseppe Visocchi.

The tall facade has three mullioned windows and above three oval rose windows. The main portal has a pointed Gothic arch. Above the entrance is an Ancient Roman spolia, poorly conserved, of a low relief depicting a votive offering, dating to the first Imperial period. To the right of the portal is an Ancient Roman statue, presumably of a high-ranking official, but nicknamed Pasquino. Flanking the facade are two medieval rectangular towers.

The first floor has a large hall, which displays Ancient Roman floor mosaics from the 2nd century BC. The mosaics depict armed Samnite warriors set between panels of geometrical designs. This mosaic was discovered in 1946 during excavations in Via Virilassi in the town. On the second floor is another large hall, and the chapel of San Onofrio. The chapel has 14th century frescoes depicting the Madonna and Child with St. John the Baptist, Christ in Glory and the saints Onofrio, John the Evangelist and Michael the Archangel. The palace also preserves frescoes detached from the local church of San Marco. They depict Martyrdom of St Dario and Scenes of Courtly Life.

The palace now serves as the Town Hall, the Register Office, and a display on the archeology of the region.
