= Broccostella =

- Comune
- Comune di Broccostella
- Location within Italy Location within Lazio
- Coordinates: 41°42′N 13°38′E
- Country: Italy
- Region: Lazio
- Province: Frosinone (FR)

Government
  - Mayor: Domenico Urbano

Area
  - Total: 11.79 km^{2} (4.55 sq mi)
- Elevation: 293 m (961 ft)

Population (31 October 2020)
  - Total: 2,800
  - Density: 240/km^{2} (620/sq mi)
- Demonym: Brocchesi
- Time zone: UTC+1 (CET)
  - Summer (DST): UTC+2 (CEST)
- Postal code: 03030
- Dialing code: 0776
- Patron saint: Madonna della Stella and Saint Michael
- Website: Official website

Broccostella is a comune (municipality) in the Province of Frosinone in the Italian region Lazio, located about 100 kilometres (62 mi) east of Rome and about 25 kilometres (16 mi) northeast of Frosinone.

Broccostella borders the following municipalities: Arpino, Campoli Appennino, Fontechiari, Posta Fibreno, Sora.

Lady Gaga's maternal great-grandparents Vincenzo Ferri and Filomena Campagna (Veronica Rose Bissett's parents) were both born in this comune when its name still was only Brocco.

== Twin towns ==
- (Republic of Ireland) Navan, Ireland
