= Lago di Posta Fibreno =

Lake in Posta Fibreno, Italy

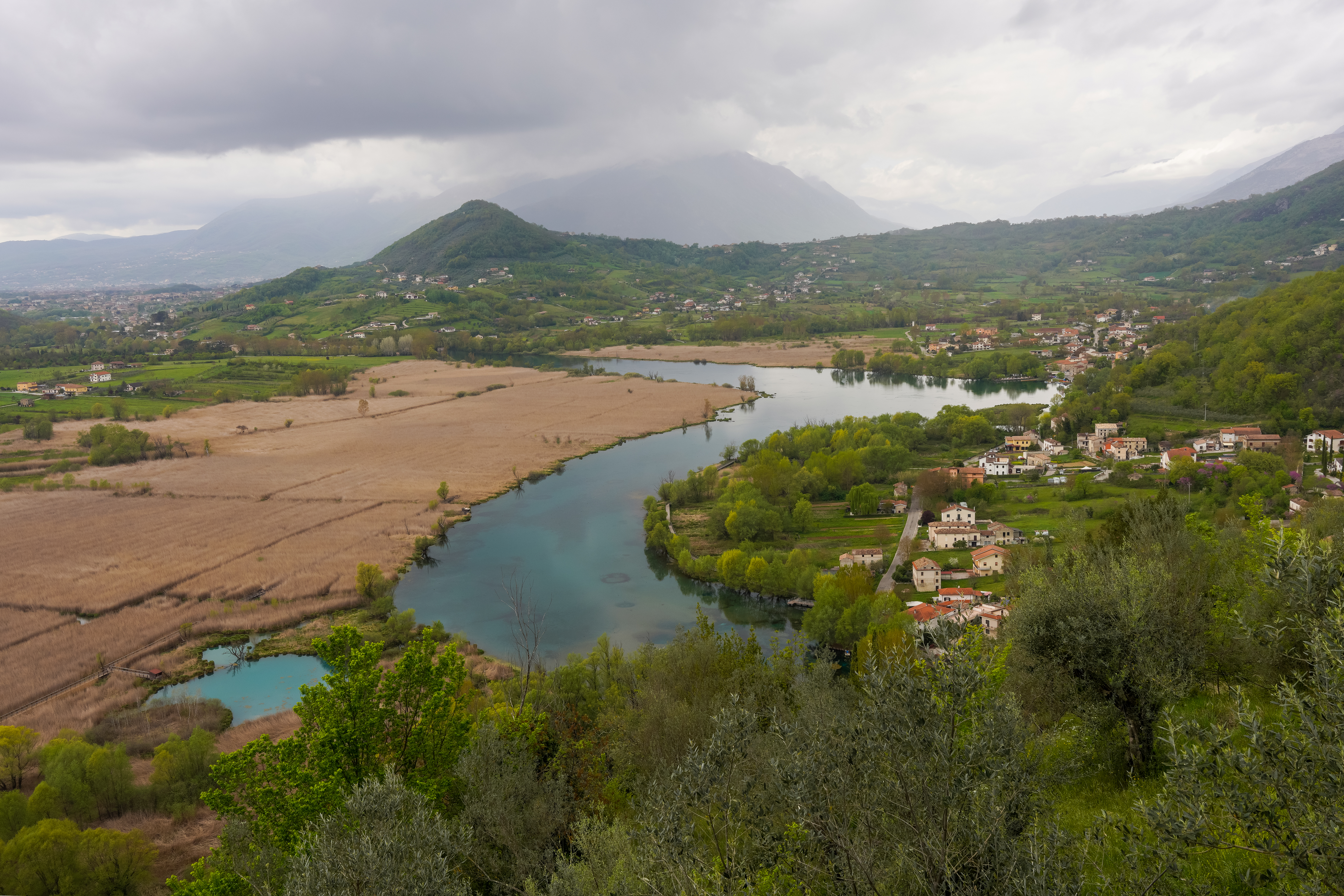

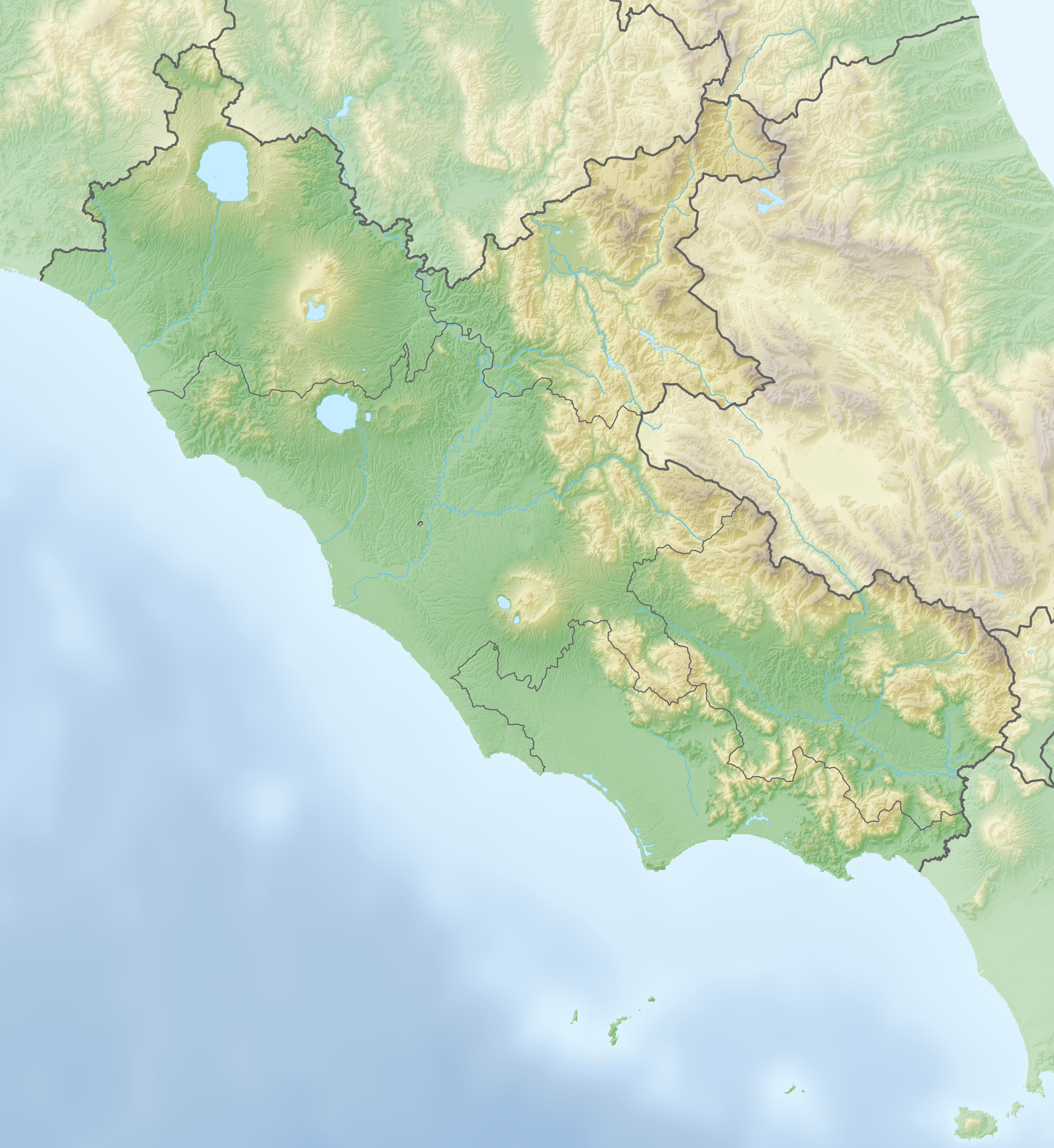
- Location within Lazio
- Location: Posta Fibreno, (Province of Frosinone, Lazio)
- Coordinates: 41.699801°N 13.686304°E
- Primary outflows: Fibreno
- Basin countries: Italy
- Surface area: 0.287 km^{2} (0.111 sq mi)
- Surface elevation: 288 m (945 ft)

Lago di Posta Fibreno is an Italian lake located in Posta Fibreno, a municipality of the Province of Frosinone, Lazio. At an elevation of 288 m, its surface area is 0.287 km^{2}. The lake is in a karstic terrain and rich in underwater springs.

== Fauna ==
The lake of Posta Fibreno is home to the endemic Fibreno trout (Salmo fibreni), along with the more widespread Mediterranean trout (Salmo cettii).
