= San Simeone, Alvito =

Church in Alvito, Italy

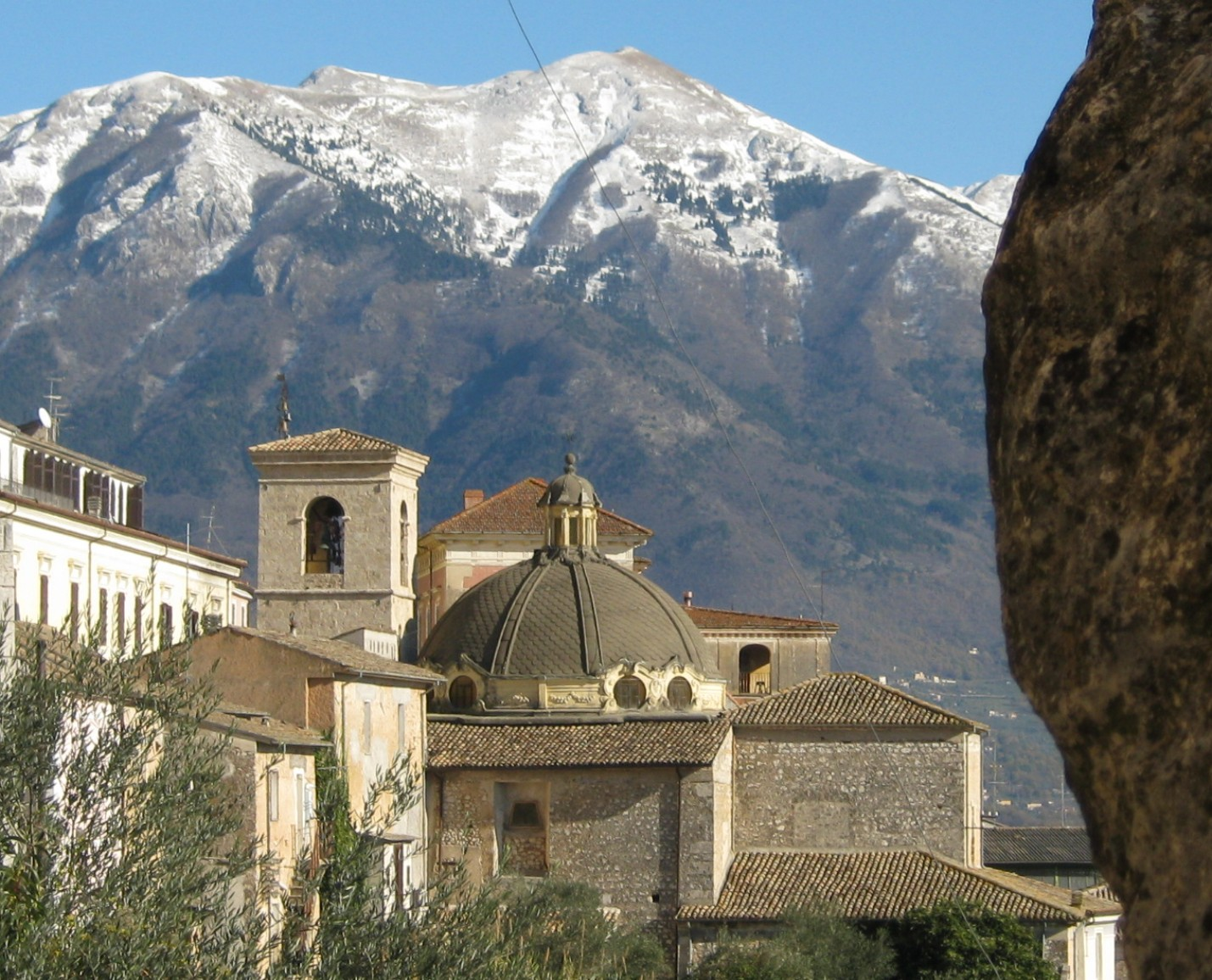
Belltower and dome of San Simeone

The Church of San Simeone Prophet (Italian: Chiesa di San Simeone Profeta) is the main Roman Catholic parish church in the district of La Valle in the town of Alvito, Lazio, in Italy's Frosinone province.

== History ==
A church at the site dates from 1101, but the base of the bell-tower is the only remaining structure. Reconstruction of the church began in 1527. The facade is simple, with a semicircular tympanum. Above the nave is a baroque dome. The bell-tower retained its Romanesque style, although a clock face was added.

The interior was refurbished in the 18th century with a late-baroque coffered ceiling with gilded frames. The church contains a Crucifixion attributed to the Cavaliere d’Arpino. In 1656 the relics of San Valerio, protector of the village, were transported here. The building was badly damaged by the earthquake of 1915 and was restored in 1934. A stairway from the church leads down from the church and former convent of San Nicola.
