= Salmo fibreni =

Conservation status
- Vulnerable (IUCN 3.1)

Scientific classification
- Kingdom: Animalia
- Phylum: Chordata
- Class: Actinopterygii
- Order: Salmoniformes
- Family: Salmonidae
- Genus: Salmo
- Species: S. fibreni

Binomial name
- Salmo fibreni Zerunian & Gandolfi, 1990

Species of fish

Salmo fibreni, or the Fibreno trout, is a freshwater salmonid fish, endemic to Lago di Posta Fibreno in central Italy.

The size of Lago di Posta Fibreno is only 0.29 km^{2}. It is a narrow lake 1.1 km long, 100–300 m wide, situated 289 m above sea level. The lake is in a karstic terrain and rich in underwater springs. The Fibreno trout breeds close to these springs in mid-winter. It is sympatric with the more widespread Salmo cettii (Mediterranean trout), and separated from it by the breeding time: S. cettii spawns in early spring.
