= Monte Greco =

Mountain in Italy

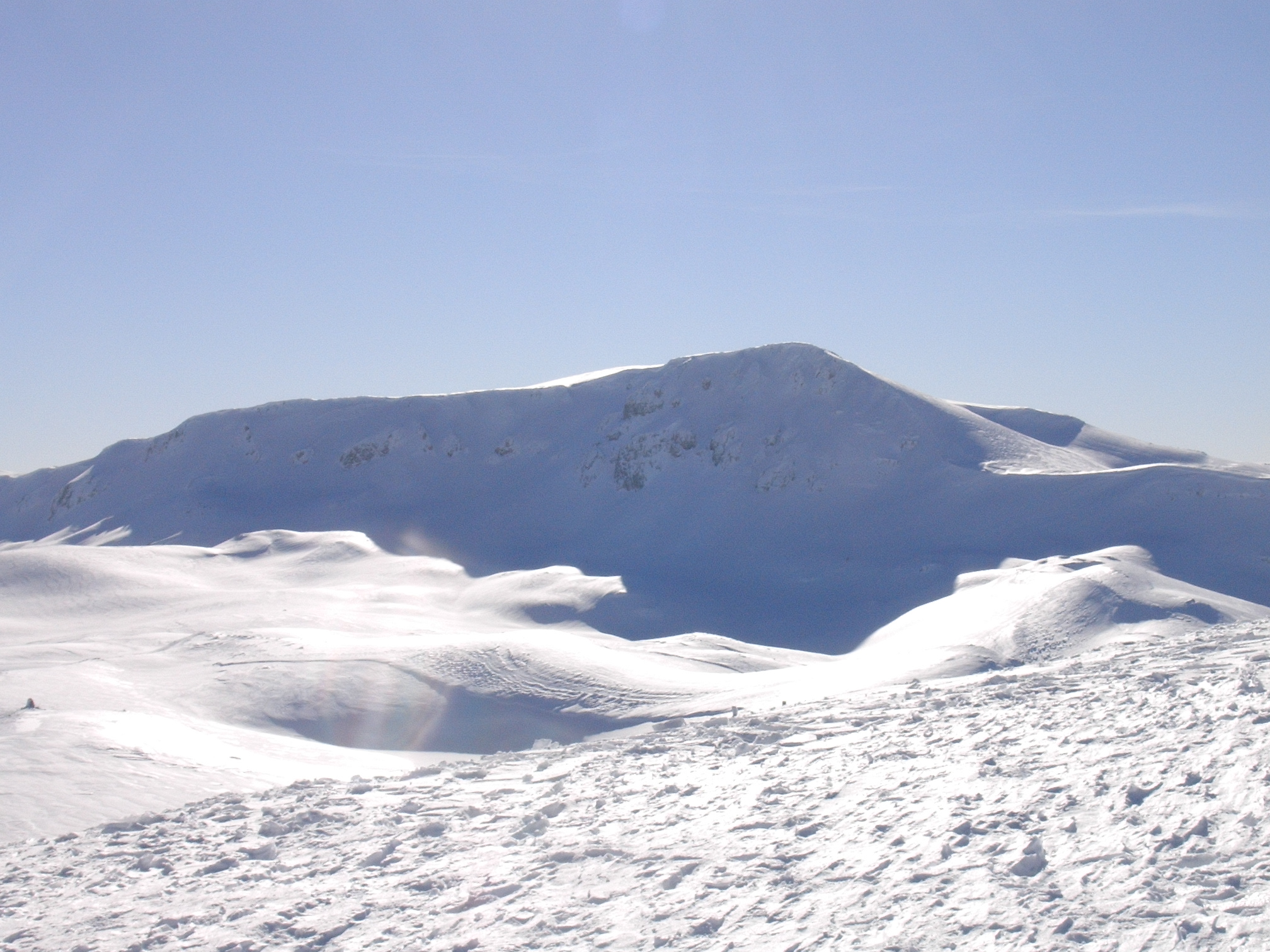
- Monte Greco seen from Roccaraso

Highest point
- Elevation: 2,285 m (7,497 ft)
- Prominence: 1,005 m (3,297 ft)
- Listing: Ribu
- Coordinates: 41°48′N 13°59′E

Geography
- Location within Italy
- Location: Abruzzo, Italy
- Parent range: central Apennines

Monte Greco is a mountain in the province of L'Aquila in the Abruzzo region of Italy. It is in the southern part of the Appennino Abruzzese mountain chain. The mountain is north of the Sangro river and Parco Nazionale d'Abruzzo, Lazio e Molise.
