= Fontechiari =

- Comune
- Comune di Fontechiari
- Coat of arms

- Location within Italy Location within Lazio
- Coordinates: 41°40′N 13°41′E
- Country: Italy
- Region: Lazio
- Province: Frosinone (FR)

Government
  - Mayor: Pierino Liberato Serafini

Area
  - Total: 16 km^{2} (6.2 sq mi)
- Elevation: 375 m (1,230 ft)

Population (30 November 2019)
  - Total: 1,289
  - Density: 81/km^{2} (210/sq mi)
- Demonym: Fontechiaresi
- Time zone: UTC+1 (CET)
  - Summer (DST): UTC+2 (CEST)
- Postal code: 03030
- Dialing code: 0776
- Website: Official website

Fontechiari is a town and comune in the province of Frosinone, Lazio, central Italy. Located in the Comino Valley, the town has borders with the municipalities of Arpino, Broccostella, Casalvieri, Posta Fibreno and Vicalvi.
