= Castello Piccolomini (Balsorano) =

Castle in Balsorano, L'Aquila, Italy

- Balsorano
- Castello Piccolomini in Balsorano

Site information
- Type: Castle

Location
- Coordinates: 41.800583°N 13.573944°E

Site history
- Built: 1460

Castello Piccolomini (Italian for Piccolomini castle) is a Middle Ages-Renaissance castle in Balsorano, Province of L'Aquila (Abruzzo).

== History ==
The castle was built by Antonio Piccolomini, nephew of pope Pius II, in 1460. Now it is an hotel and it has been used as location for several Italian films.

== Architecture ==
The castle has an irregular pentagonal plan with circular towers at each corner. The building is in stone and the main entrance is through the surrounding park. The internal courtyard is L-shaped with a well in the middle.
