= Vicalvi =

- Comune
- Comune di Vicalvi
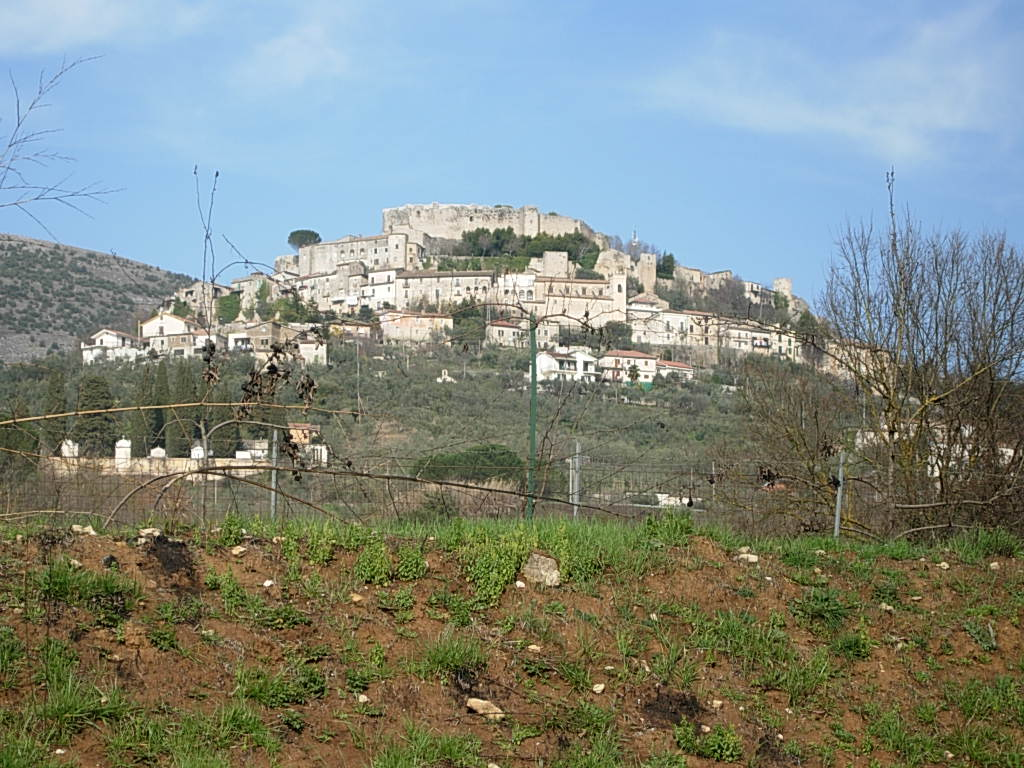
- View of Vicalvi

- Location within Italy Location within Lazio
- Coordinates: 41°41′N 13°43′E
- Country: Italy
- Region: Lazio
- Province: Frosinone (FR)

Government
  - Mayor: Gabriele Ricciardi

Area
  - Total: 8.21 km^{2} (3.17 sq mi)
- Elevation: 590 m (1,940 ft)

Population (28 February 2017)
  - Total: 760
  - Density: 93/km^{2} (240/sq mi)
- Demonym: Vicalvesi
- Time zone: UTC+1 (CET)
  - Summer (DST): UTC+2 (CEST)
- Postal code: 03030
- Dialing code: 0776
- Website: Official website

Vicalvi (locally Ucalue) is a comune (municipality) in the Province of Frosinone in the Italian region Lazio, located in the Valle di Comino about 100 kilometres (62 mi) east of Rome and about 30 kilometres (19 mi) east of Frosinone.

Vicalvi borders the following municipalities: Alvito, Casalvieri, Fontechiari, Posta Fibreno.

Sights include the Lombard Castle, built in the 11th century. There are also remains of Cyclopean walls built by the Samnites in ancient times.

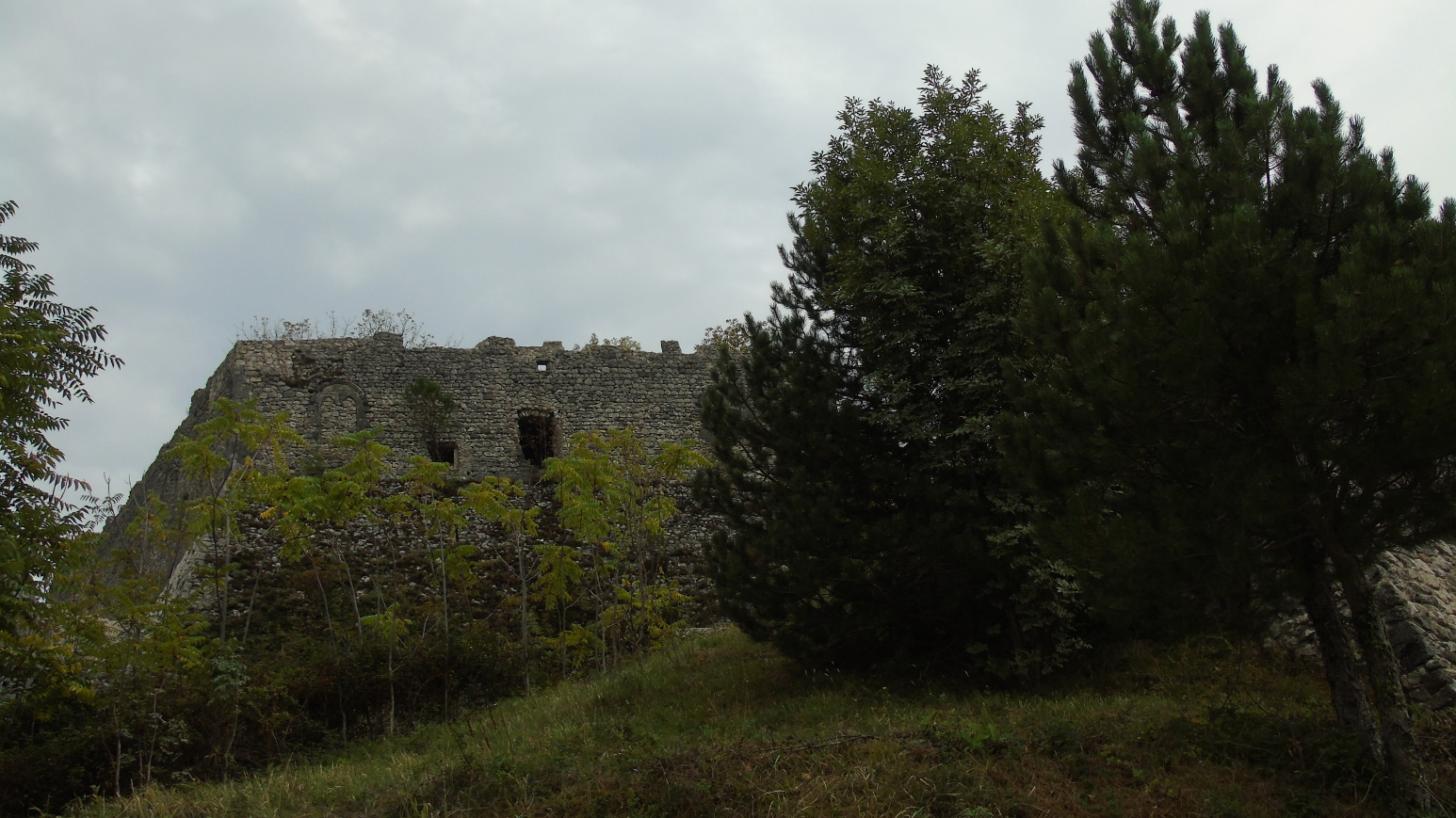
Castle of Vicalvi
