= Giardino Botanico "Loreto Grande" =

Botanical garden in Italy

Coordinates: 41°58′29″N 13°33′44″E

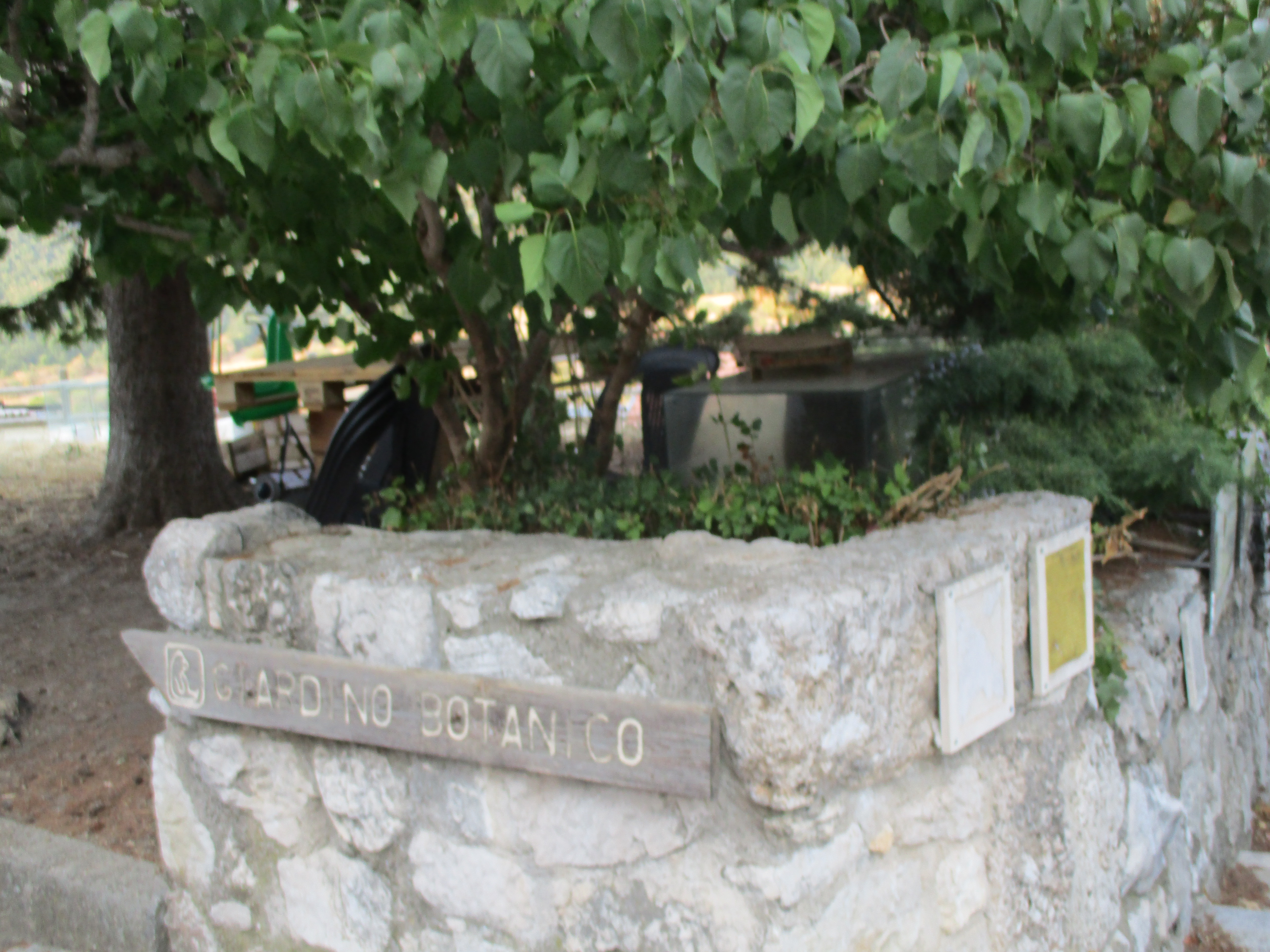

The Giardino Botanico "Loreto Grande" is a small botanical garden located in the Parco Nazionale d'Abruzzo, Lazio e Molise, in the commune of Villavallelonga, province of L'Aquila, Abruzzo, Italy.

The garden was established in 1984 and named in honor of botanist Loreto Grande. It contains maple, beech, hazels, black hornbeam, and wild roses.

== See also ==
- List of botanical gardens in Italy
