= Balsorano =

- Comune
- Comune di Balsorano

- Coat of arms

- Location within Italy Location within Abruzzo
- Coordinates: 41°48′39″N 13°33′39″E
- Country: Italy
- Region: Abruzzo
- Province: L'Aquila (AQ)
- Frazioni: Balsorano Vecchio, Case Marconi, Case Alfonsi, Collecastagno, Collepiano, Le Fosse, Pelagalli, Ridotti, Noce Grande, La Selva, Vigne Cerase

Government
  - Mayor: Antonella Buffone

Area
  - Total: 58.85 km^{2} (22.72 sq mi)
- Elevation: 340 m (1,120 ft)

Population (1° January 2025)
  - Total: 3.234
  - Density: 0.05495/km^{2} (0.1423/sq mi)
- Demonym: Balsoranesi
- Time zone: UTC+1 (CET)
  - Summer (DST): UTC+2 (CEST)
- Postal code: 67052.
- Dialing code: 0863
- Patron saint: St. George Martyr
- Saint day: 23 April
- Website: Official website

Balsorano (Marsicano: Balz'rana) is a comune (municipality) and town in the province of L'Aquila in the Abruzzo region of Italy. The comune, situated in the Valle Roveto, south of Marsica marks the geographical border between the regions Abruzzo and Lazio.

The comune is divided into Balsorano Vecchio, located on the slopes at high altitude of the Monte Cornacchia (mountain range of the Monti Ernici almost completely abandoned after the 1915 Avezzano earthquake and the new urban centre built further down the valley, Balsorano Nuovo. The territory of the comune is crossed by the Liri borders south with Sora, north with San Vincenzo Valle Roveto and at east with some areas of the Abruzzo, Lazio and Molise National Park.

== History ==
Balsorano is mentioned for the first time in the 10th century. During the Middle Ages and modern era, it was held by the Piccolomini baronial family.

== Main sights ==
- Piccolomini castle: The castle was built by Antonio Piccolomini, nephew of pope Pius II, in 1460.

Now it is a hotel and it has been used as location for several Italian movies.

== Climate ==
Climate data for Balsorano, elevation 400 m (1,300 ft), (1951–2000)
Month	Jan	Feb	Mar	Apr	May	Jun	Jul	Aug	Sep	Oct	Nov	Dec	Year
Mean daily maximum °C (°F)	10.4 (50.7)	11.3 (52.3)	13.8 (56.8)	16.7 (62.1)	22.4 (72.3)	26.7 (80.1)	30.3 (86.5)	30.3 (86.5)	25.8 (78.4)	20.4 (68.7)	14.4 (57.9)	11.0 (51.8)	19.5 (67.0)
Daily mean °C (°F)	5.0 (41.0)	5.7 (42.3)	7.9 (46.2)	10.5 (50.9)	15.3 (59.5)	18.9 (66.0)	21.8 (71.2)	21.8 (71.2)	18.3 (64.9)	13.7 (56.7)	8.8 (47.8)	5.9 (42.6)	12.8 (55.0)
Mean daily minimum °C (°F)	−0.3 (31.5)	0.1 (32.2)	2.1 (35.8)	4.4 (39.9)	8.2 (46.8)	11.1 (52.0)	13.3 (55.9)	13.3 (55.9)	10.9 (51.6)	7.0 (44.6)	3.1 (37.6)	0.8 (33.4)	6.2 (43.1)
Average precipitation mm (inches)	113.6 (4.47)	122.6 (4.83)	100.2 (3.94)	155.4 (6.12)	69.1 (2.72)	46.1 (1.81)	33.8 (1.33)	41.1 (1.62)	79.3 (3.12)	144.5 (5.69)	236.8 (9.32)	214.7 (8.45)	1,357.2 (53.42)
Average precipitation days	7.4	7.6	9.1	9.6	7.9	5.9	4.3	4.4	6.4	8.3	10.7	10.4	92
Source: Regione Abruzzo
