= Settefrati =

- Comune
- Comune di Settefrati
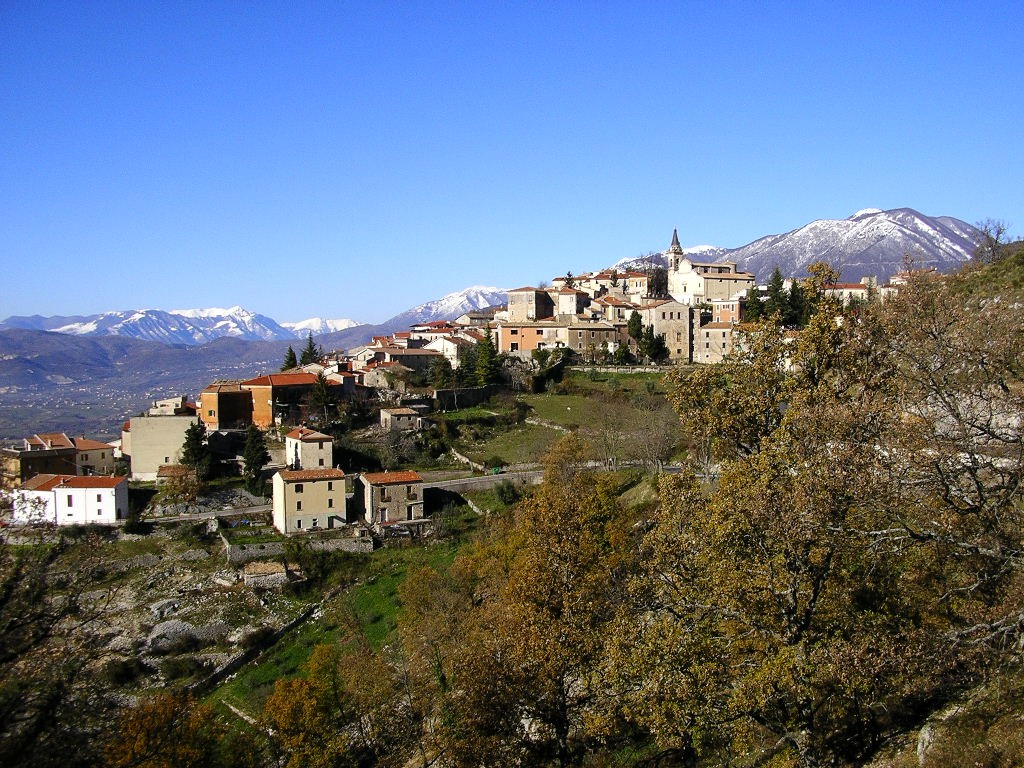
- View of Settefrati

- Location within Italy Location within Lazio
- Coordinates: 41°40′N 13°51′E
- Country: Italy
- Region: Lazio
- Province: Frosinone (FR)
- Frazioni: Antica, Colle Pizzuto, Frattaroli, Lota, Perillo, Pietrafitta, Tellino, Tiani, Valle Pecorina

Area
  - Total: 50.6 km^{2} (19.5 sq mi)
- Elevation: 784 m (2,572 ft)

Population (28 February 2017)
  - Total: 727
  - Density: 14.4/km^{2} (37.2/sq mi)
- Demonym: Settefratesi
- Time zone: UTC+1 (CET)
  - Summer (DST): UTC+2 (CEST)
- Postal code: 03040
- Dialing code: 0776
- Patron saint: St. Stephen Protomartyr
- Website: Official website

Settefrati is a comune (municipality) in the Province of Frosinone in the Italian region Lazio, located about 120 kilometres (75 mi) east of Rome and about 40 kilometres (25 mi) east of Frosinone.

== Main sights ==
The territory of Settefrati houses the ancient Sanctuary of Canneto; near to it, in 1958, remains of an ancient temple dedicated to the Italic goddess Mefitis was found (c. 3rd century BC).

In 1974 less than a kilometre from the town centre, at Casa Firma, remains of a Roman villa dating to the late Imperial era were found.

Of the 10th-century castle a tower and some ruins remain.
