= Atina, Lazio =

Atina
- Comune
- Comune di Atina
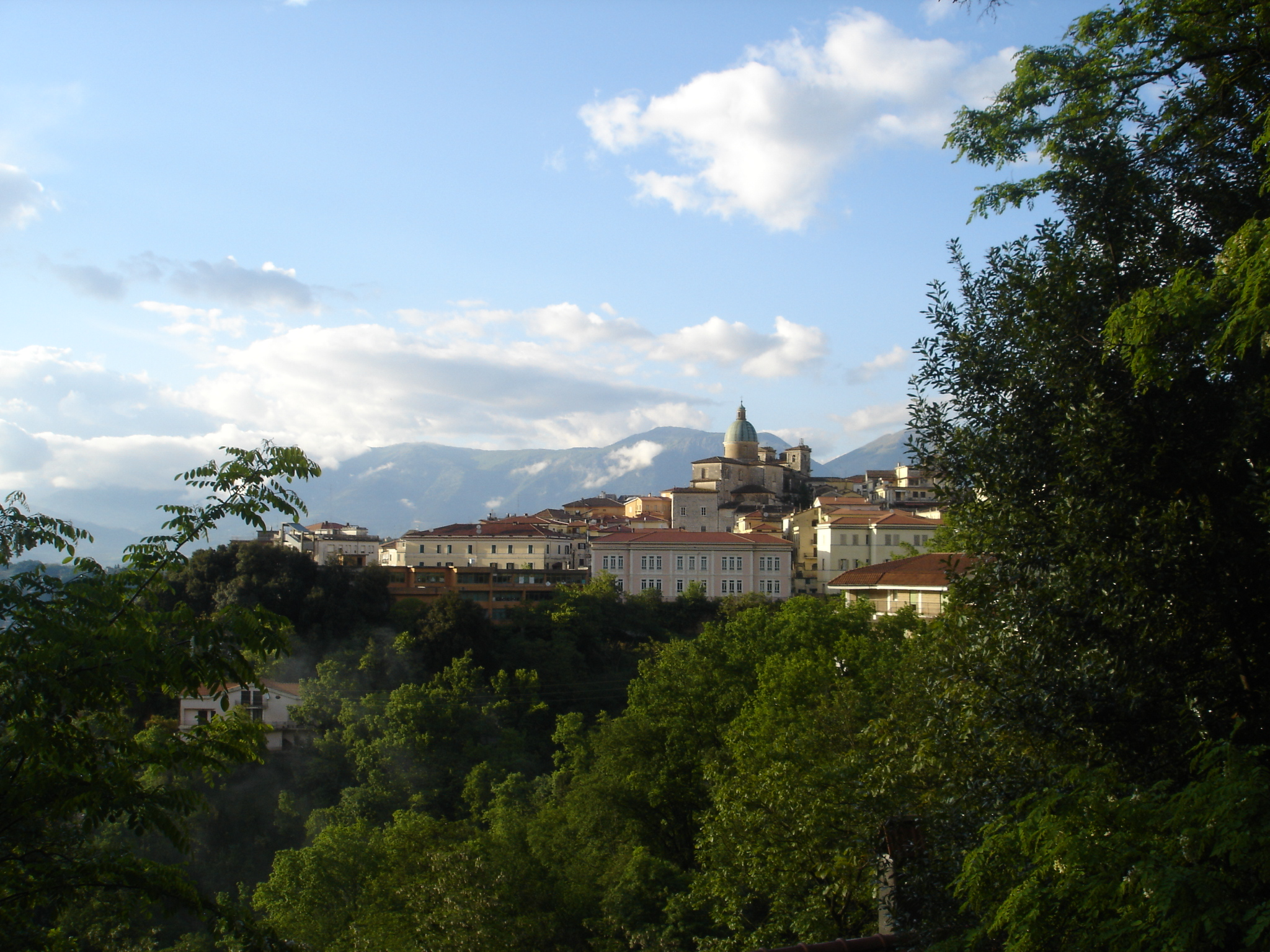
- View of Atina

- Coat of arms

- Location within Italy Location within Lazio
- Coordinates: 41°37′N 13°48′E
- Country: Italy
- Region: Lazio
- Province: Frosinone (FR)
- Frazioni: Capo di China, Colle Alto, Colle Melfa, Le Sode, Ponte Melfa, Rosanisco, Sabina, San Marciano, Settignano

Government
  - Mayor: Adolfo Valente

Area
  - Total: 29.89 km^{2} (11.54 sq mi)
- Elevation: 481 m (1,578 ft)

Population (31 July 2021)
  - Total: 4,100
  - Density: 140/km^{2} (360/sq mi)
- Demonym: Atinati or Atinesi
- Time zone: UTC+1 (CET)
  - Summer (DST): UTC+2 (CEST)
- Postal code: 03042
- Dialing code: 0776
- Patron saint: San Marco Galileo
- Saint day: October 1
- Website: www.comune.atina.fr.it

Atina is a town and comune in the province of Frosinone, Lazio region of central Italy. It is one of I Borghi più belli d'Italia ("The most beautiful villages of Italy"). The economy is mostly based on agriculture (olive oil, wine – including Cabernet – and beans).

== History ==
Atina was a town of the Samnites, later conquered by the Romans.

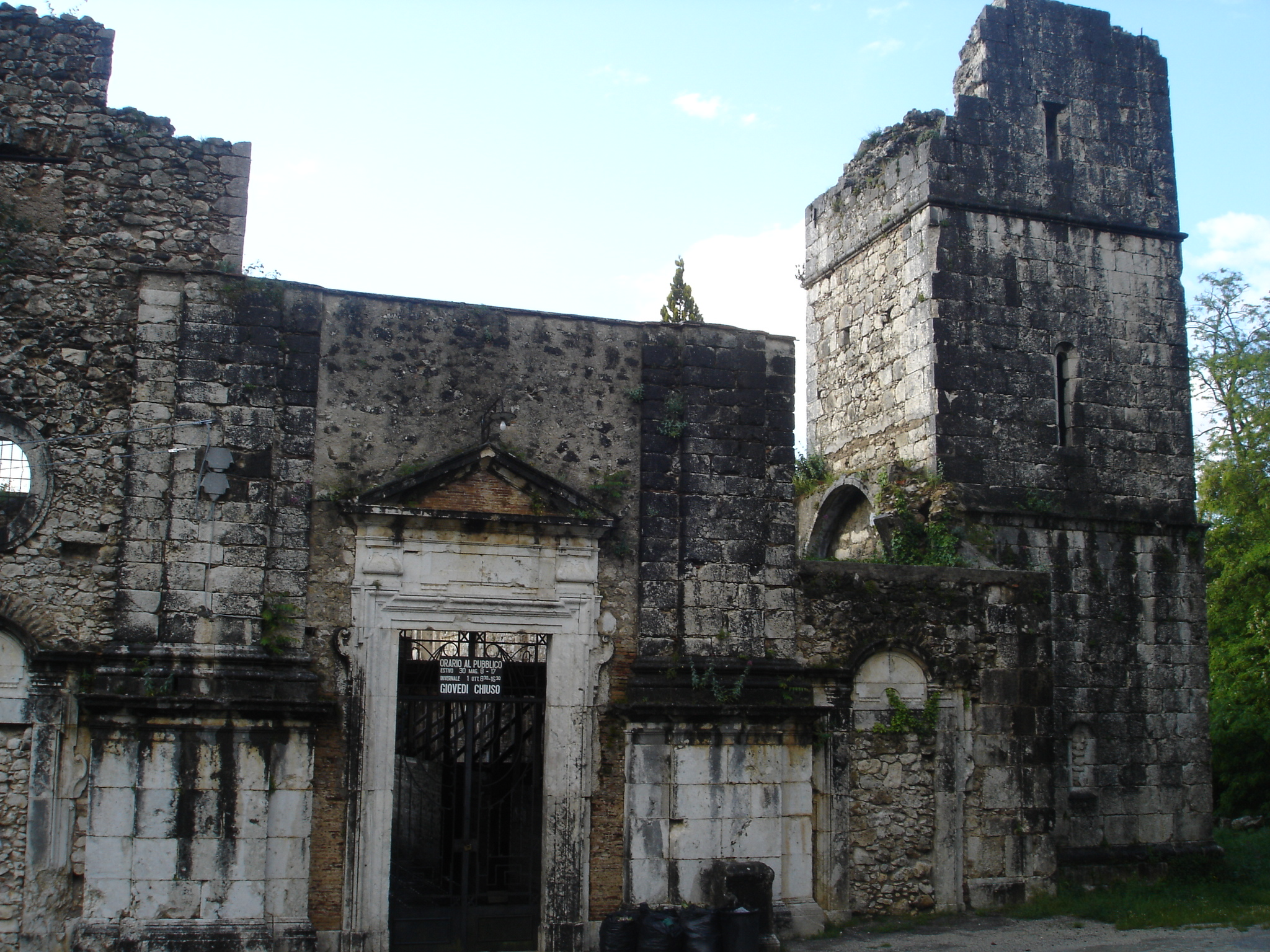
The church of San Marco with the annexed Roman ruins

Cicero speaks of it as a prosperous country town, which had not as yet fallen into the hands of large proprietors; and inscriptions show that in the Imperial age it was still flourishing.

After the fall of the Western Roman Empire, it was conquered by the Lombards, becoming part of the Duchy of Benevento in 702. Later it was ruled by the lords of Capua, the counts of the Marsi and those of Aquino, and, together with of most of the Comino Valley of the County (later Duchy) of Alvito. It remained part of the Kingdom of Naples until 1860.

Once a part of the Terra di Lavoro province, it was included in the province of Frosinone in 1929.

== Main sights ==
The walls, of carefully worked polygonal blocks of stone, are still preserved in parts: their enclosure is larger than the modern town. The sawn blocks perfectly match and fit together in order to settle a seismic-resistant structure over millenniums; therefore, earthquakes could not break up or damage the existing construction. The ways in which the blocks were cut and carried remain a mystery even to the present day, and later populations have not replicated the interlacement of the polygonal masonry.

The cyclopean fortification come in two types: polygonal and squared. The polygonal blocks within a sophisticated groove interlacement whereas the work surfaces are sawed or not manufactured. On the other hand, the squared blocks are settled following parallel plans and worked with chisel. One of these remains is a boundary stone relating to the assignation of lands in the time of the Gracchi, of which six other examples have been found in Campania and Basilicata.

Other sights include:

- Ducal Palace or Palazzo Ducale: built in Gothic-style in 1349 by the nobleman Rostaino Cantelmo. The façade has three mullioned windows and an ogival portal with an ancient Roman relief. The "Noble Floor" has a mosaic from the 2nd century BCE.
- Cathedral of Santa Maria Assunta: built in Baroque style, was first erected in the 11th century on the remains of a temple dedicated to Saturn. The current Baroque style dates back to the 18th century. It has a nave, two aisles, and frescoes of St. John the Baptist, St. Thomas Aquinas and the Transfiguration painted by Teodoro Mancini (1796–1868).
- Convent of St Francis (17th century): held by Franciscan friars until 1865, when it was abandoned. In 1871, it became property of the municipality of Atina.

== Atina DOC ==
The alluvial marl vineyard soils around the ancient boundaries of Atina are home to a Denominazione di origine controllata (DOC) zone specializing in red wines. The standard DOC red wine of Atina is composed of 50–70% Cabernet Sauvignon and 10–30% each of Syrah, Merlot and Cabernet franc with other local red grape varieties such as Abbuoto permitted to make up to 15% of the blend. Wines labeled as Cabernet are composed of at least 85% of Cabernet Sauvignon and/or Cabernet franc. Grapes destined for DOC wine production must be harvested to a yield no greater than 12 tonnes/hectare with the finished wines needing to attain a minimum alcohol level of at least 12%. A separate Riserva bottling can be made of any DOC wine provided the wines have a minimum alcohol level of 12.5% and are aged at least two years prior to release.

== Notable people ==
- Bruno Arcari (born 1942) professional boxer
