= Villavallelonga =

- Comune
- Comune di Villavallelonga
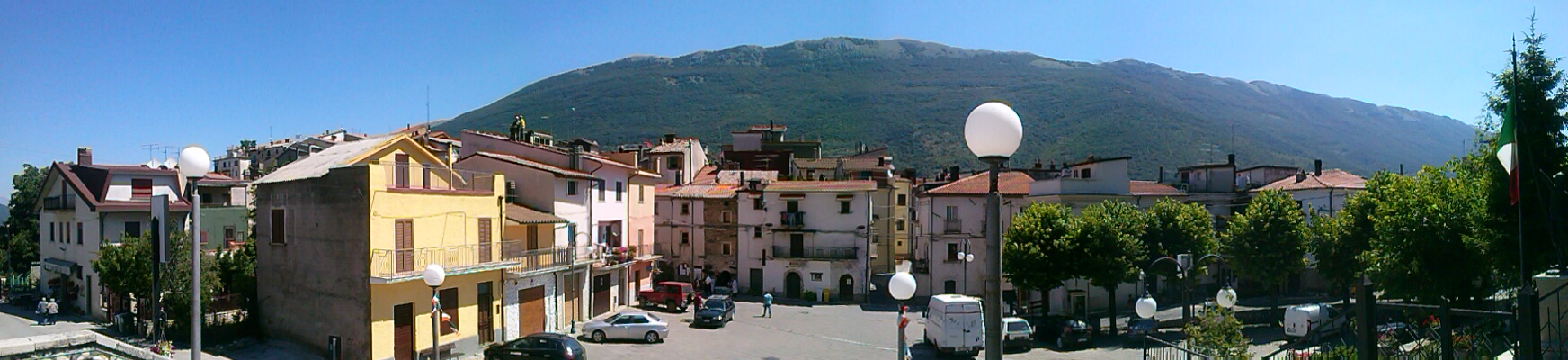

- Location within Italy Location within Abruzzo
- Coordinates: 41°52′21″N 13°37′20″E
- Country: Italy
- Region: Abruzzo
- Province: L'Aquila (AQ)

Government
  - Mayor: Leonardo Lippa

Area
  - Total: 73.28 km^{2} (28.29 sq mi)
- Elevation: 1,005 m (3,297 ft)

Population (31 December 2010)
  - Total: 931
  - Density: 12.7/km^{2} (32.9/sq mi)
- Demonym: Villavallelonghesi
- Time zone: UTC+1 (CET)
  - Summer (DST): UTC+2 (CEST)
- Postal code: 67050
- Dialing code: 0863
- Patron saint: St. Leucius
- Saint day: September 2
- Website: Official website

Villavallelonga (locally La Vìlla) is a village and comune in the Abruzzo region in central Italy. A part of Marsica traditional area, it is included in the Abruzzo, Lazio and Molise National Park.

== Main sights ==
- Giardino Botanico "Loreto Grande"

== Climate ==
Climate data for Villavallelonga, elevation 945 m (3,100 ft), (1951–2000)
Month	Jan	Feb	Mar	Apr	May	Jun	Jul	Aug	Sep	Oct	Nov	Dec	Year
Record high °C (°F)	21.5 (70.7)	21.0 (69.8)	23.0 (73.4)	27.5 (81.5)	30.5 (86.9)	35.0 (95.0)	37.5 (99.5)	38.0 (100.4)	35.5 (95.9)	28.5 (83.3)	25.0 (77.0)	23.0 (73.4)	38.0 (100.4)
Mean daily maximum °C (°F)	6.2 (43.2)	7.3 (45.1)	10.1 (50.2)	13.5 (56.3)	19.1 (66.4)	23.3 (73.9)	26.9 (80.4)	27.0 (80.6)	22.3 (72.1)	16.8 (62.2)	10.8 (51.4)	6.9 (44.4)	15.9 (60.5)
Daily mean °C (°F)	1.9 (35.4)	2.5 (36.5)	5.1 (41.2)	8.2 (46.8)	13.1 (55.6)	16.6 (61.9)	19.6 (67.3)	19.8 (67.6)	16.0 (60.8)	11.3 (52.3)	6.4 (43.5)	3.0 (37.4)	10.3 (50.5)
Mean daily minimum °C (°F)	−2.4 (27.7)	−2.3 (27.9)	0.0 (32.0)	2.8 (37.0)	7.0 (44.6)	9.9 (49.8)	12.3 (54.1)	12.6 (54.7)	9.7 (49.5)	5.8 (42.4)	2.0 (35.6)	−1.0 (30.2)	4.7 (40.5)
Record low °C (°F)	−15.0 (5.0)	−20.0 (−4.0)	−15.0 (5.0)	−8.0 (17.6)	−4.0 (24.8)	0.5 (32.9)	2.5 (36.5)	1.5 (34.7)	−0.5 (31.1)	−6.5 (20.3)	−12.5 (9.5)	−14.0 (6.8)	−20.0 (−4.0)
Average precipitation mm (inches)	115.5 (4.55)	119.1 (4.69)	93.4 (3.68)	107.4 (4.23)	71.8 (2.83)	51.8 (2.04)	34.3 (1.35)	37.4 (1.47)	79.7 (3.14)	110.2 (4.34)	185.0 (7.28)	166.5 (6.56)	1,172.1 (46.16)
Average precipitation days	9.5	9.0	9.4	9.7	8.1	6.3	4.2	4.3	6.1	7.4	10.4	10.2	94.6
Source: Regione Abruzzo
