= Valle di Comino =

Valley in Lazio, Italy

- Val Comino
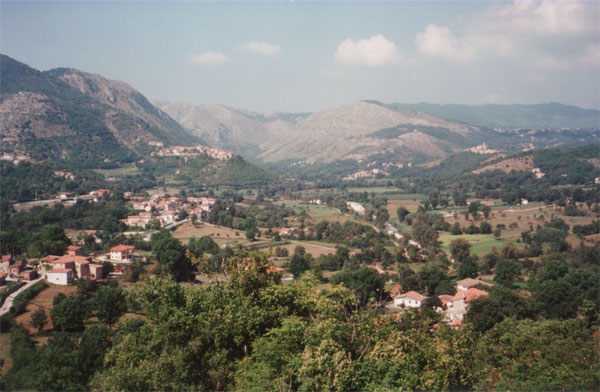
- The Valle di Comino near Casalattico
- Long-axis direction: east-west

Geography
- Coordinates: 41°38′N 13°48′E
- Interactive map of Valle di Comino

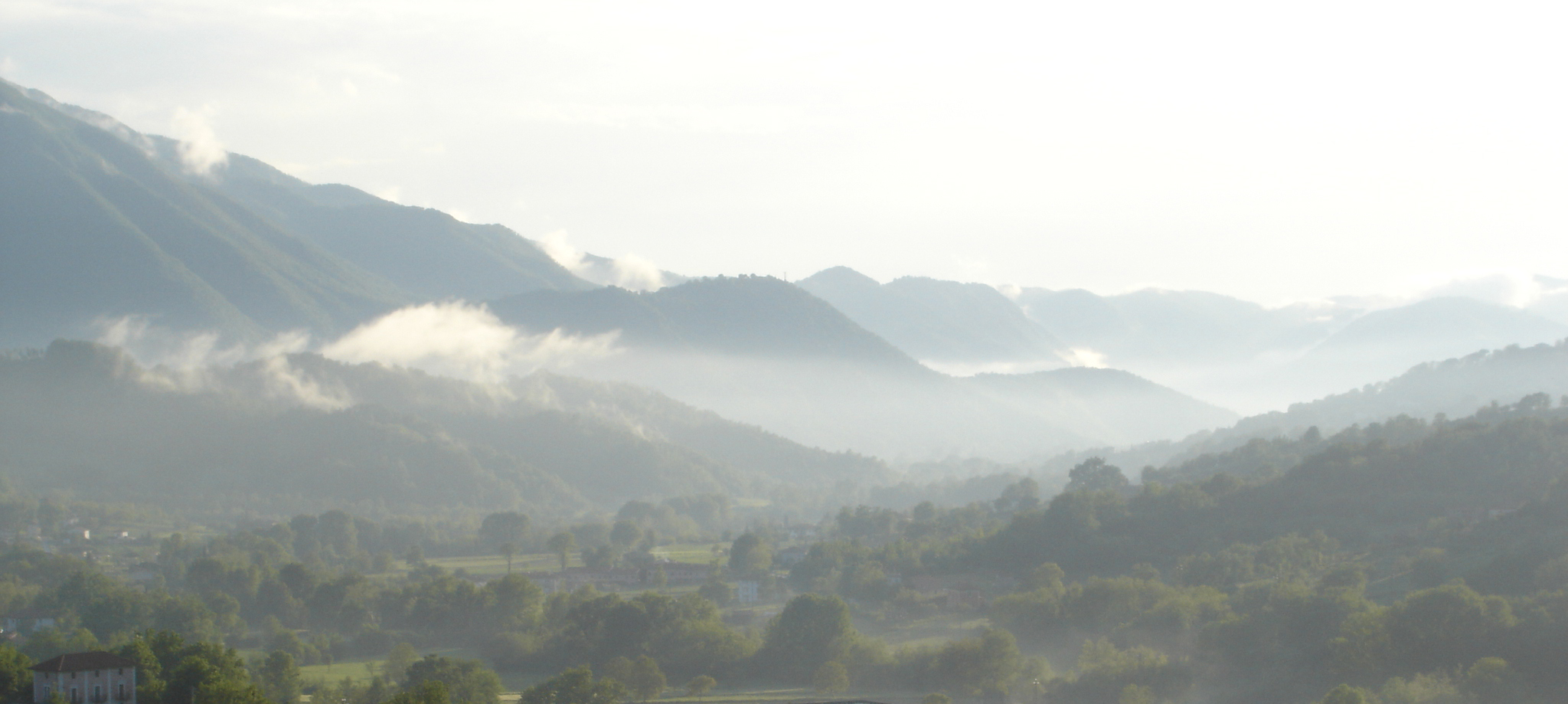
The Valle di Comino from Picinisco

The Valle di Comino (Italian: [ˈvalle di ˈkɔmino]) is a valley in the province of Frosinone, Lazio, in central Italy. It runs from San Biagio Saracinisco to Vicalvi and is adjacent to the Abruzzo mountains. It grossly corresponds to the upper valley of the Melfa river, which runs through it before joining the Liri.

== History ==
According to tradition, the name of the valley can be traced to ancient Cominium, destroyed in 293 BC. In Livy's History of Rome, there are early references to Cominium as the site of a battle between the Samnites and the Romans. Some suggest that the town of San Donato is the ancient Cominium, others believe the battle site was at Vicalvi.

The area was however already settled in prehistoric times; later it was inhabited by Osco-Sabellian tribes. Its main center was Atina, mentioned in Virgil's Aeneid. In the Middle Ages, numerous castles were built in the valley, which was part of the Lombard Duchy of Spoleto, the Principality of Capua and the county of Aquino, until it became part of the Norman unified Kingdom of Sicily. For a period it was also contested between the monasteries of Monte Cassino and San Vincenzo al Volturno. Later it was a fief of families such as the Aquino, Cantelmo, Borgia and Gallio.

== Economy ==
In the past, the valley was characterized by a strong presence of land sown with wheat, maize and lucerne and cultivations of vines and olive trees. Quality wine and olive oil are still produced today. Due to the presence of excellent land for mountain pastures, even pastoralism (cattle and especially sheep) has been for centuries one of the main activities: the production of ricotta and cheeses which are still renowned, despite the quantitative decrease of this activity. Tourism is mainly limited to the inhabitants of the neighboring regions.
