= Alvito, Lazio =

Alvito
- Comune
- Comune di Alvito
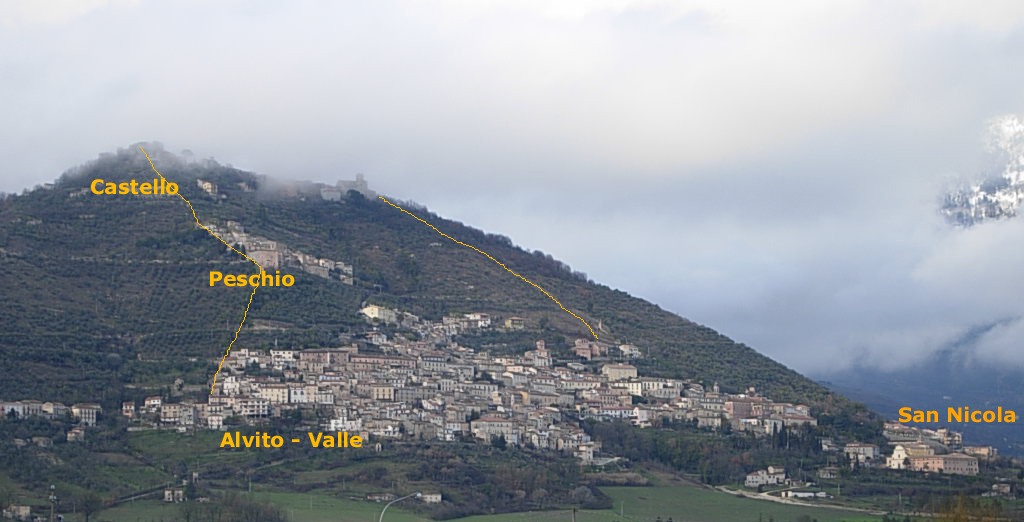
- Panorama of Alvito

- Coat of arms

- Location of Alvito in Italy Alvito (Lazio)
- Coordinates: 41°41′N 13°44′E
- Country: Italy
- Region: Lazio
- Province: Frosinone (FR)
- Frazioni: Sant'Onofrio

Government
  - Mayor: Duilio Martini (since May 2006)

Area
  - Total: 52 km^{2} (20 sq mi)
- Elevation: 475 m (1,558 ft)

Population (28 February 2015)
  - Total: 2,733
  - Density: 53/km^{2} (140/sq mi)
- Demonym: Alvitani
- Time zone: UTC+1 (CET)
  - Summer (DST): UTC+2 (CEST)
- Postal code: 03041
- Dialing code: 0776
- Patron saint: St. Valerius Martyr
- Saint day: First Tuesday after Pentecost
- Website: Official website

Alvito is a town and comune in central Italy, in the province of Frosinone, south of Rome in the Lazio region. Its territory is included in the Abruzzo, Lazio and Molise National Park.

== History ==
Alvito was called in antiquity "Albetum", and was later a possession of the Counts of Aquino and the Cantelmo family.

Alvito was the seat of a Duchy, created in 1454, on the boundary of the Kingdom of Naples (later, Kingdom of the Two Sicilies). Alvito, together with Sora, remained faithful to the Angevine line during the conquest of Alfonso V of Aragon, being conquered by the Aragonese only in 1496. Later it was a possession of the Gallio family.

== Main sights ==
The village is articulated in three district urban nuclei that include: il Castello (fortress), il Peschio, La Valle, contained in long town-walls still well preserved here and there.

The Palazzo Ducale (or Palazzo Gallio, Ducal Palace), built in Renaissance style by Tolomeo Gallio in the late 16th-early 17th centuries, is located on the main road of La Valle Suburb, constituting the true nucleus of the present village. On the same road are other important buildings (Palazzo Sipari, Palazzo Graziani, Palazzo Panicali) of the 19th century. A little bit forward, on the left hand, a short small road goes uphill to the Church of S. Teresa, in a baroque style, with a high portal.

The main parish church, San Simeone (16th century), is located in La Valle near the Palazzo Sipari. The church has a Romanesque bell tower and an 18th-century interior. From the church, passing through a Gothic gate, is a stairway leading to the deconsecrated monastery of San Nicolas, a former Franciscan institution. The monastery was nearly destroyed by the earthquake in 1915, restored in 1934: it has maintained the chorus and the inlaid cupboards of the 18th century, ordered by Pope Clement XIV.

== People ==
Alvito is the place of birth of:

- Mario Equicola a Renaissance humanist
- Antonio Fazio, former chairman of Bank of Italy
- Erminio Sipari a conservationist, founder and first president of Parco Nazionale d'Abruzzo

== Twin towns ==
- Alvito, Portugal

== Gallery ==
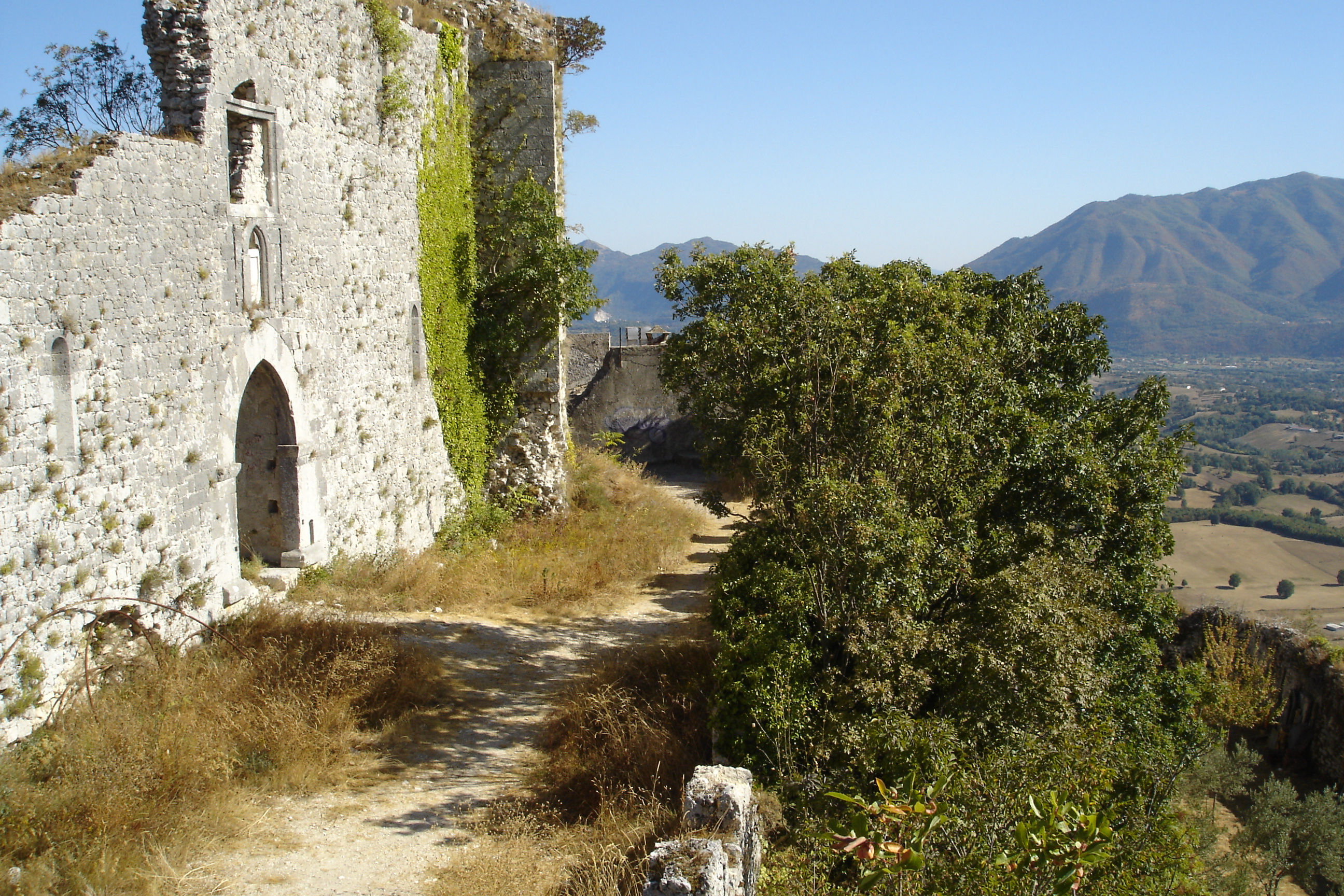
Remains of the Alvito's fortress

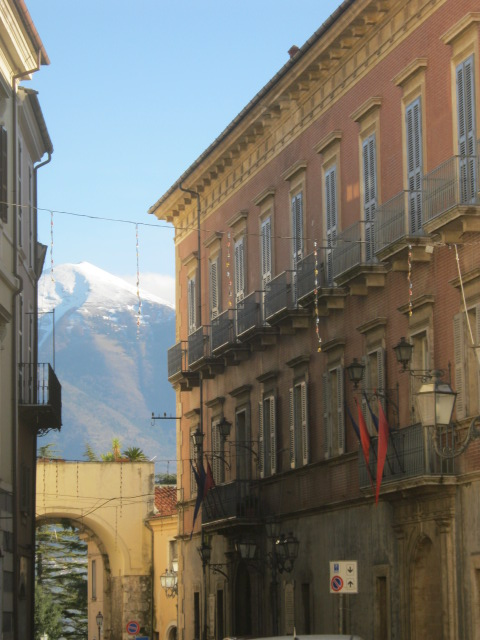
The main street with Palazzo Sipari
