= Paser =

Paser may refer to:

== People ==
- Paser (vizier) of ancient Egypt
- Paser I, viceroy of Kush
- Paser II, viceroy of Kush
- Paser (mayor), governed Thebes under Ramesses III
- other individuals named Paser, including the author of the Paser Crossword Stela

== Places ==
- Paser Regency, a regency in East Kalimantan province, Indonesia
  - Tana Paser or Tanah Grogot, the capital city of the Paser Regency
- Penajam North Paser Regency, a regency in East Kalimantan province, Indonesia

== Other ==
- 4-Aminosalicylic acid, an antibiotic sold by Jacobus Pharmaceutical under the trademark Paser
- Paser (device), used to create an electron beam
- Pavement Surface Evaluation and Rating, a scale of pavement condition
