= Filippo Balbi =

Italian painter

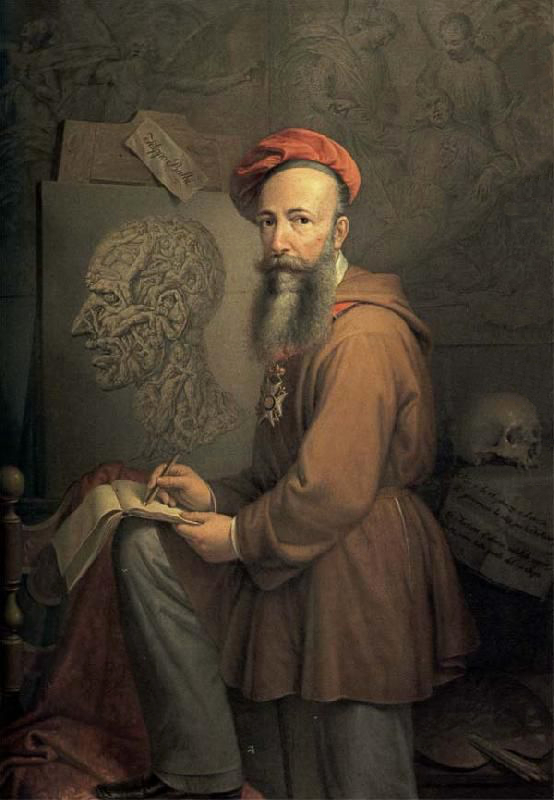
Filippo Balbi, self-portrait, 1873

Filippo Balbi (1806 – 27 September 1890) was an Italian painter, active in an archaic style depicting allegoric and religious scenes.

== Early life ==
Filippo was born in Naples, and studied in the Academy of Fine Arts of his native city, but moved to Rome.

== Career ==
In 1844, one of his first commissions was for a Madonna della Cintura for the Convent of the Madonna della Neve in Frosinone. In 1854, he began to paint a ceiling for the Certosa di Trisulti located in Collepardo, province of Frosinone.

Much of his life's output after 1859 was for the Certosa, including canvases for the church, lunettes, and eclectic frescoes for the pharmacy. He also painted a Testa anatomica (1854), located now in the Museo di Storia della Medicina of the Sapienza University of Rome in Rome.

He painted an Immaculate Conception (1877) for the Church of the Consolazione in Collepardo, now on display in a chapel of the parish church of Santissimi Salvatore.

Filippo died in Alatri in 1890.

== Gallery ==
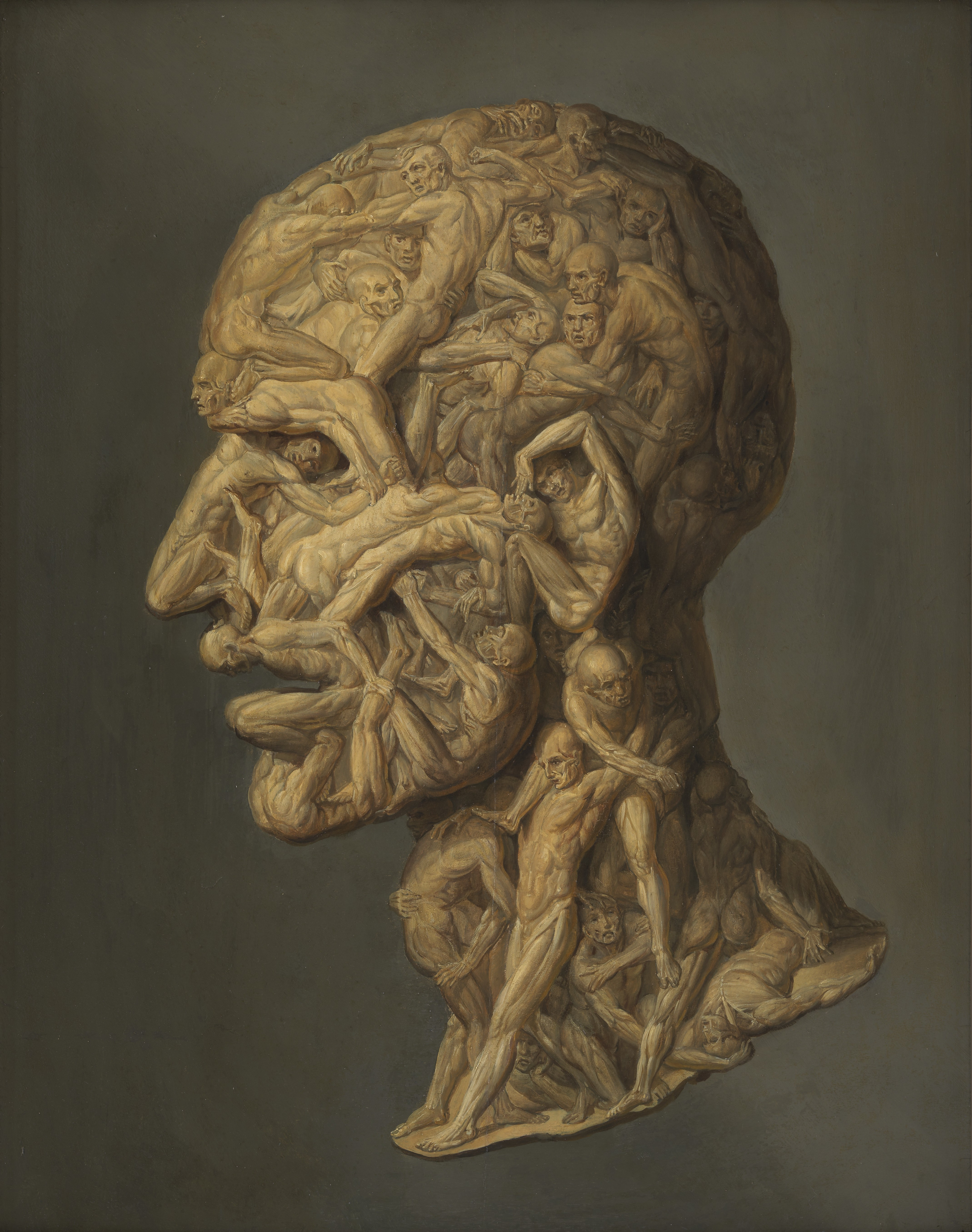
Testa anatomica

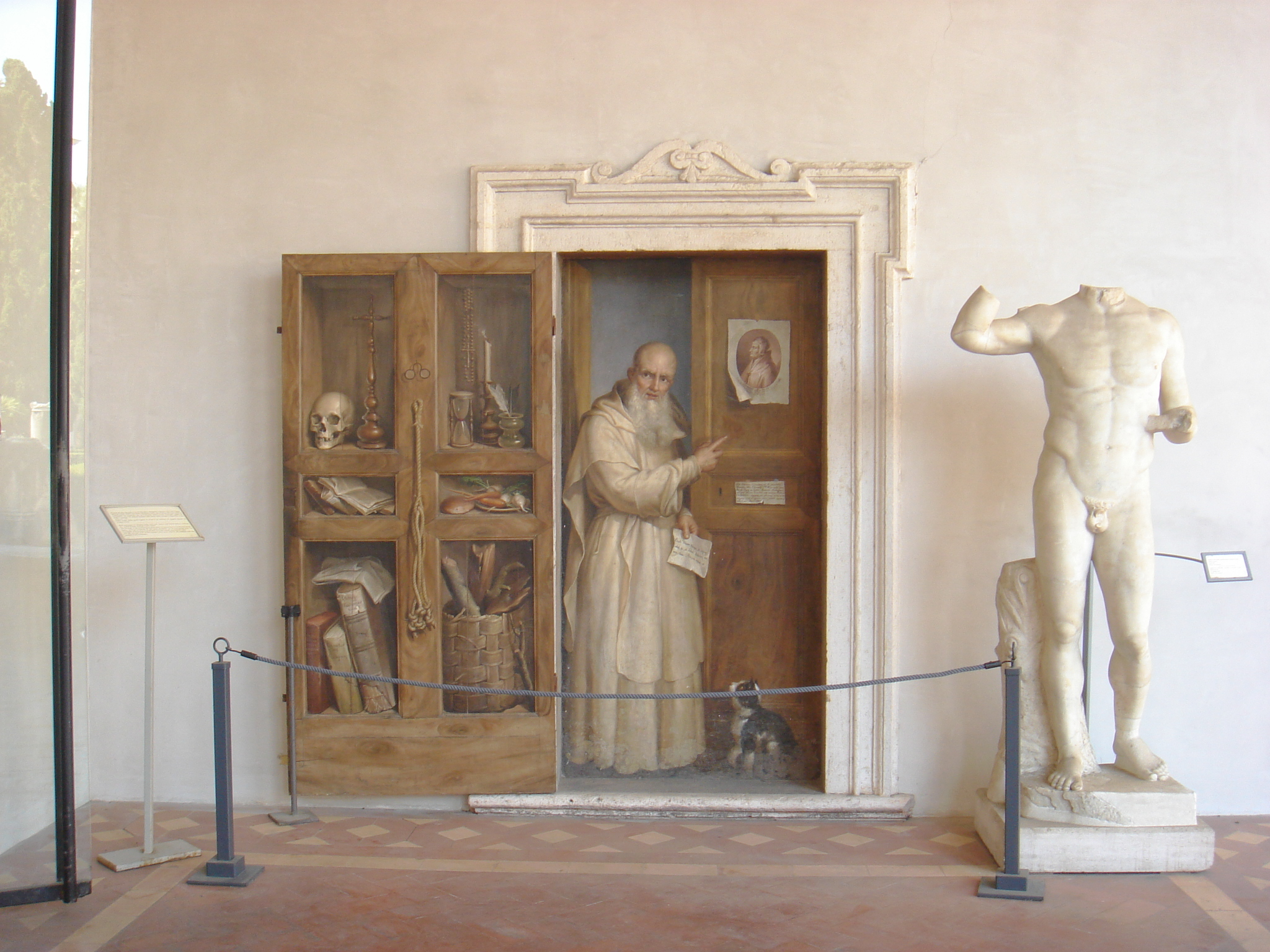
Terme Diocleziano

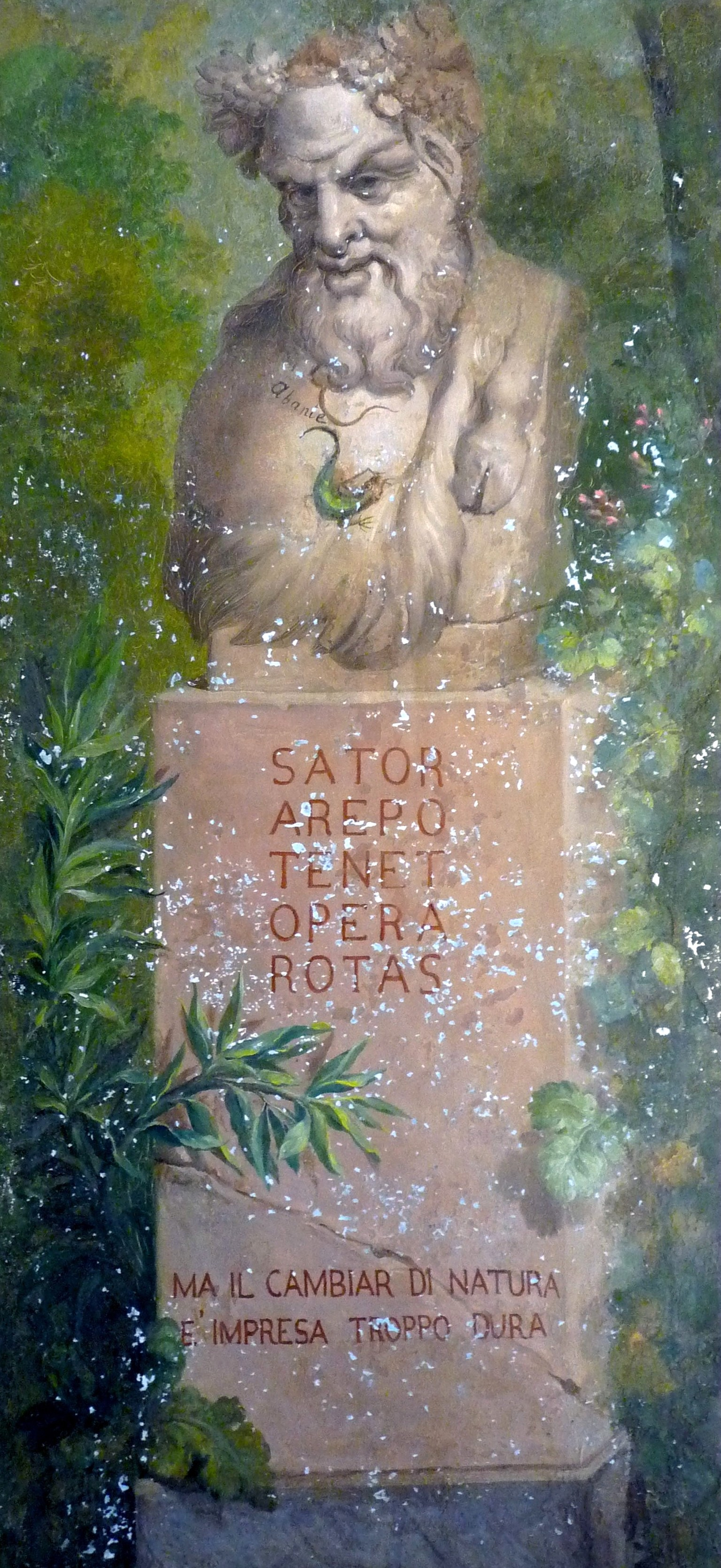
Sator Square (c. 1860) at the Trisulti Charterhouse
