= Sator Square =

Roman-era word square with a Latin palindrome

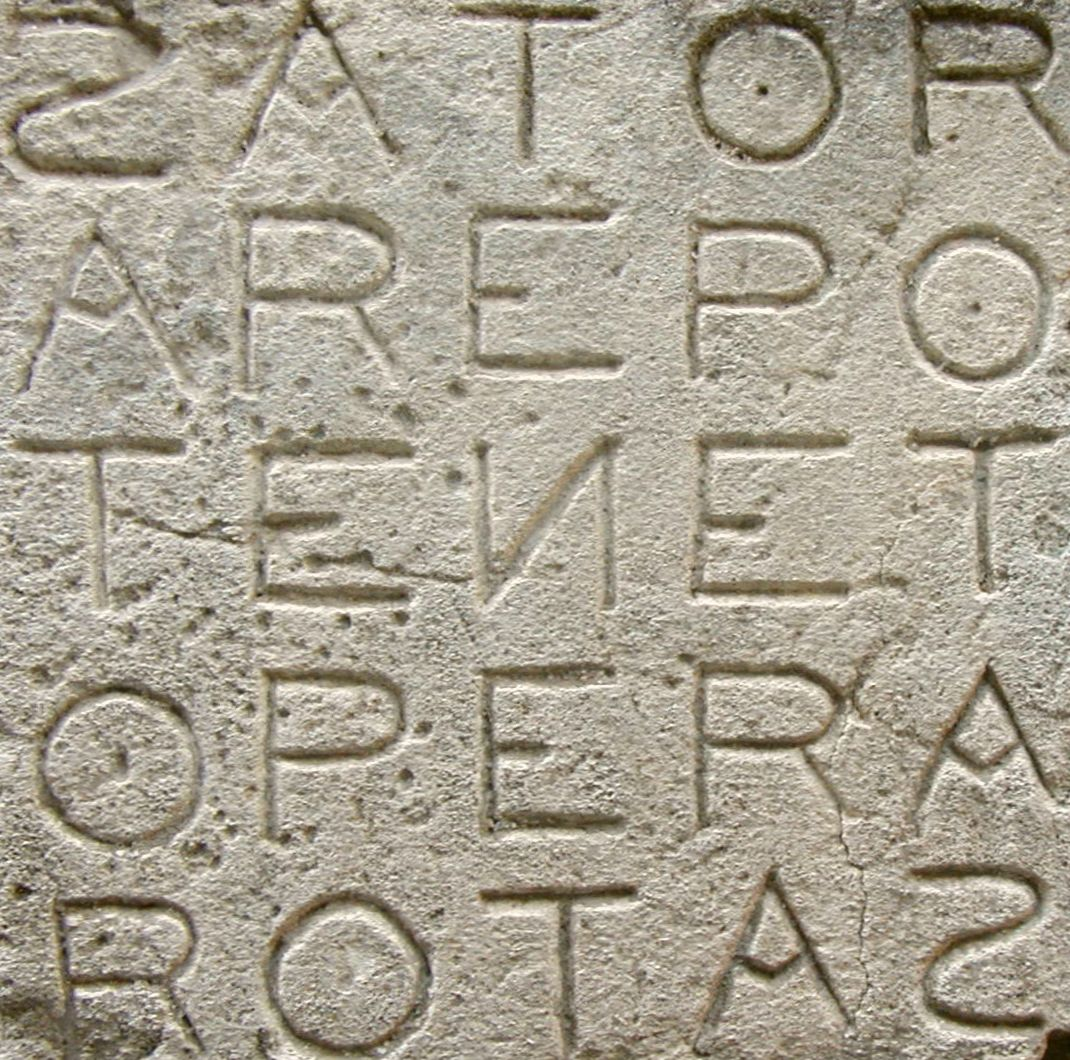
A Sator Square (laid out in the SATOR format), etched onto a wall in the medieval fortress town of Oppède-le-Vieux, France

The Sator Square (also called the Rotas-Sator Square or the Templar Magic Square) is a two-dimensional acrostic class of word square containing a five-word Latin palindrome. The earliest squares were found at Roman-era sites and were all in ROTAS form (i.e. where the top line is "ROTAS" and not "SATOR"), with the earliest discovery at Pompeii (and dating from before the earthquake of AD 62). (Note: Work by Italian archaeologist Amedeo Maiuri in 1938 showed that graffito on the Pompeii palestra square column associated with the Rotas square were linked to graffito that would have predated the earthquake of AD 62; this was later confirmed by German classical philologist Friedrich Focke in 1948 based on an analysis of the stucco plastering of the specific palestra square columns.) The earliest square with Christian-associated imagery dates from the sixth century. (Note: The fourth- or fifth-century Coptic papyrus with a Sator square had no evidence of any Christian associations or Christian imagery; it would be another two centuries before the first Sator squares appeared that had additional Christian imagery that would definitively associate them as Christian.) By the Middle Ages, Sator squares were to be found in Europe, Asia Minor, and in North Africa. In 2022, the Encyclopedia Britannica called it "the most familiar lettered square in the Western world".

A significant volume of academic research has been published on the square, but after more than a century, there is no consensus on its origin and meaning. The emergence of the "Paternoster theory" in 1926 led to a brief consensus among academics that the square was created by early Christians, but the subsequent discoveries at Pompeii led many academics to believe that the square was more likely created as a Roman word puzzle (per the Roma-Amor puzzle), which was later adopted by Christians. This origin theory, however, fails to explain how a Roman word puzzle became such a powerful religious and magical medieval symbol. It has instead been argued that the square was created in its ROTAS form as a Jewish symbol, embedded with cryptic religious symbolism, which was later adopted in its SATOR form by Christians. Other less-supported academic origin theories include a Pythagorean or Stoic puzzle, a Gnostic or Orphic or Italian pagan amulet, a cryptic Mithraic or Semitic numerology charm, or that it was a device for assessing wind direction.

The square has long associations with magical powers throughout its history (and even up to the 19th century in North and South America), including a perceived ability to extinguish fires, particularly in Germany. The square appears in early and late medieval medical textbooks such as the Trotula, and was employed as a medieval cure for many ailments, particularly for dog bites and rabies, as well as for insanity, and relief during childbirth.

It has featured in a diverse range of contemporary artworks including fiction books, paintings, musical scores, and films, and most notably in Christopher Nolan's 2020 film Tenet. In 2020, The Daily Telegraph called it "one of the closest things the classical world had to a meme".

== Description and naming ==
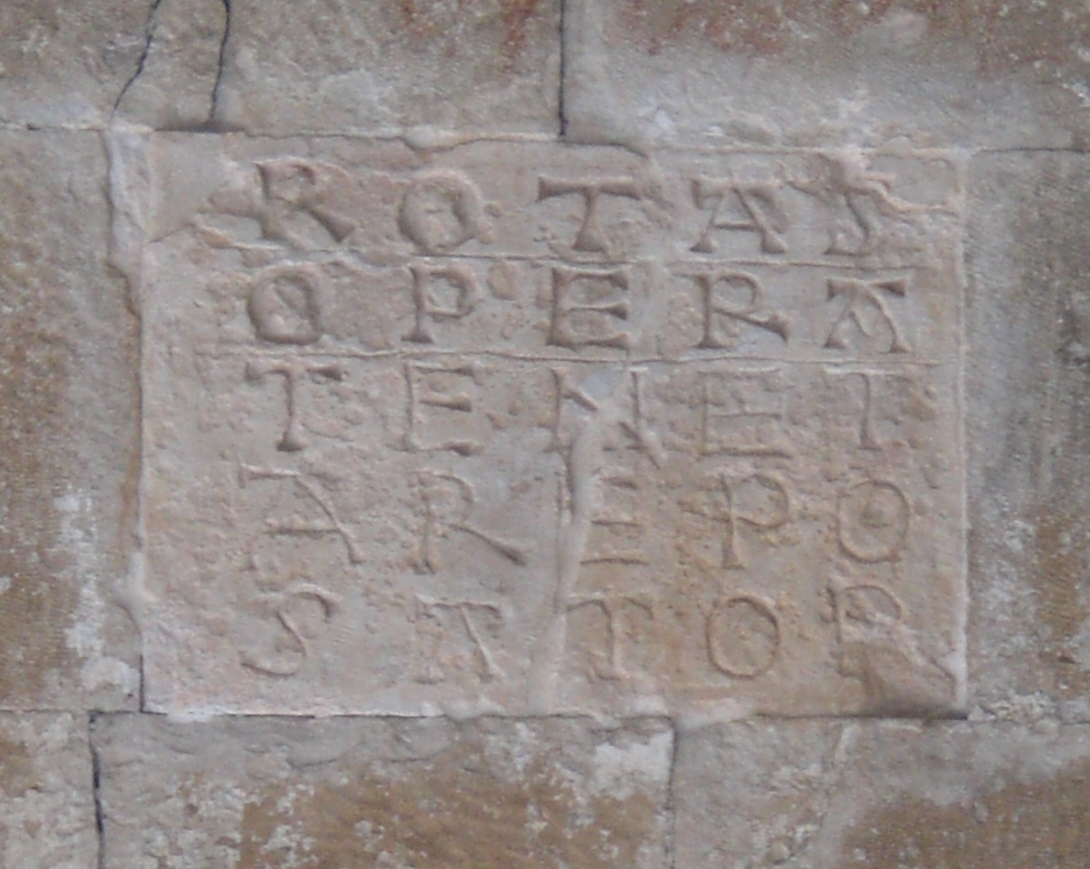
Sator square (in ROTAS form) on the eighth-century facade of Abbey of St. Peter ad Oratorium in Italy

The Sator square is arranged as a 5 × 5 grid consisting of five 5-letter words, thus totaling 25 characters. It uses 8 different Latin letters: 5 consonants (S, T, R, P, N) and 3 vowels (A, E, O). In some versions, the vertical and horizontal lines of the grid are also drawn, but in many cases, there are no such lines. The square is described as a two-dimensional palindrome, or word square, which is a particular class of a double acrostic.

The square comes in two forms: ROTAS (left, below), and SATOR (right, below):

R O T A S
O P E R A
T E N E T
A R E P O
S A T O R

S A T O R
A R E P O
T E N E T
O P E R A
R O T A S

The earliest Roman-era versions of the square have the word ROTAS as the top line (called a ROTAS-form square, left above), but the inverted version with SATOR in the top line became more dominant from early medieval times (called a SATOR-form square, right above). Some academics call it a Rotas-Sator Square, and some of them refer to the object as a rebus, or a magic square. Since medieval times, it has also been known as a Templar Magic Square.

== Discovery and dating ==
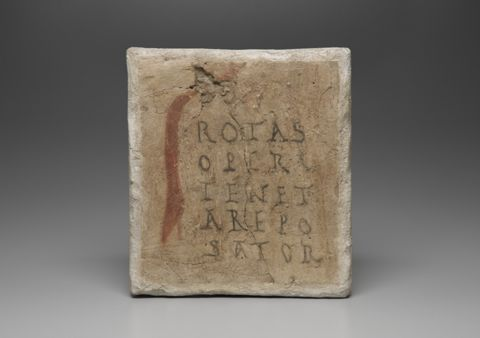
One of the four Sator squares (all in ROTAS form) found at Dura-Europos, Syria, circa AD 200.

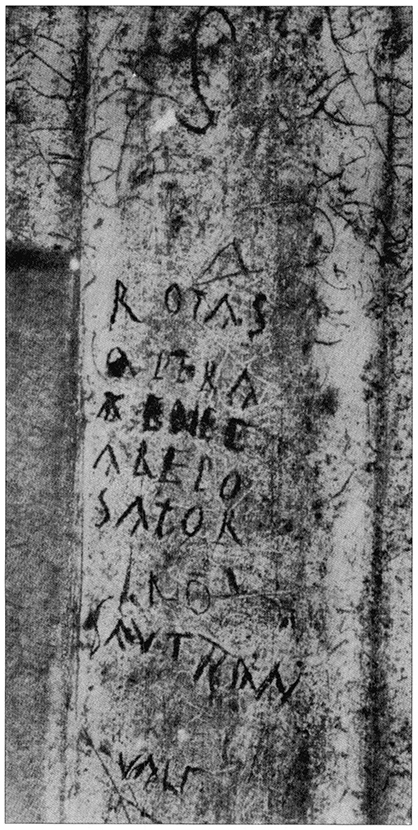
The oldest known square. Found in 1936 on a column in the Palestra Grande (CIL 8623), it is now kept in the Pompeii Museum.

The existence of the square was long recognized from early medieval times, and various examples have been found in Europe, Asia Minor, North Africa (in mainly Coptic settlements), and the Americas. Medieval examples of the square in SATOR form abound, including the earliest French example in a Carolingian Bible from AD 822 at the monastery of Saint-Germain-des-Prés. Many medieval European churches and castles have Sator square inscriptions.

The first recognized serious academic study of the Sator square is the 1881 publication of Reinhold Köhler's historical survey in Zeitschrift für Ethnologie, which was titled "Sator-Arepo-Formel". Since then, a considerable body of academic research has been published on the topic.

Until the 1930s, a Coptic papyrus with the square in the ROTAS form dating from the fourth or fifth century AD was considered the earliest version. In 1889, British ancient historian Francis Haverfield identified the 1868 discovery of a Sator square found in ROTAS form scratched on a plaster wall in the Roman settlement of Corinium at Cirencester to be of Roman origin; however, his assertion was discounted at the time by most academics, who considered the square to be an "early medieval charm".

Haverfield was ultimately proved right by the 1931–32 excavations at Dura-Europos in Syria that uncovered three separate Sator square inscriptions, all in ROTAS form, on the interior walls of a Roman military office (and a fourth a year later) that were dated from circa AD 200.

In 1936, Italian archaeologist Matteo Della Corte discovered a Sator square, also in ROTAS form, inscribed on a column in the Palestra Grande (the gymnasium) near the Amphitheatre of Pompeii (CIL IV 8623). This discovery led Della Corte to reexamine a fragment of a square, again also in ROTAS form, that he had made in 1925 at the house of Publius Paquius Proculus, also at Pompeii (CIL IV 8123). The square at the house of Publius Paquius Proculus was dated between AD 50 and AD 79 (based on the decorative style of the interior), and the palestra square find was dated pre-AD 62 (and therefore before the earthquake of AD 62), making it the oldest known Sator square discovery to date.

== Translation ==
=== Individual words ===
The words are in Latin, and the following translations are known by scholars:

SATOR
(nominative noun; from serere, "to sow") sower, planter, founder, progenitor (usually divine); originator; literally 'seeder';
AREPO
unknown word, perhaps a proper name, either invented to complete the palindrome or of a non-Latin origin (see § Arepo interpretations);
TENET
(verb; from tenere, 'to hold') he/she/it holds, keeps, comprehends, possesses, masters, preserves, sustains;
OPERA
(ablative [see opera] singular noun) service, pains, labor; care, effort, attention;
ROTAS
(rotās, accusative plural of rota) wheels.

=== Sentence construction ===
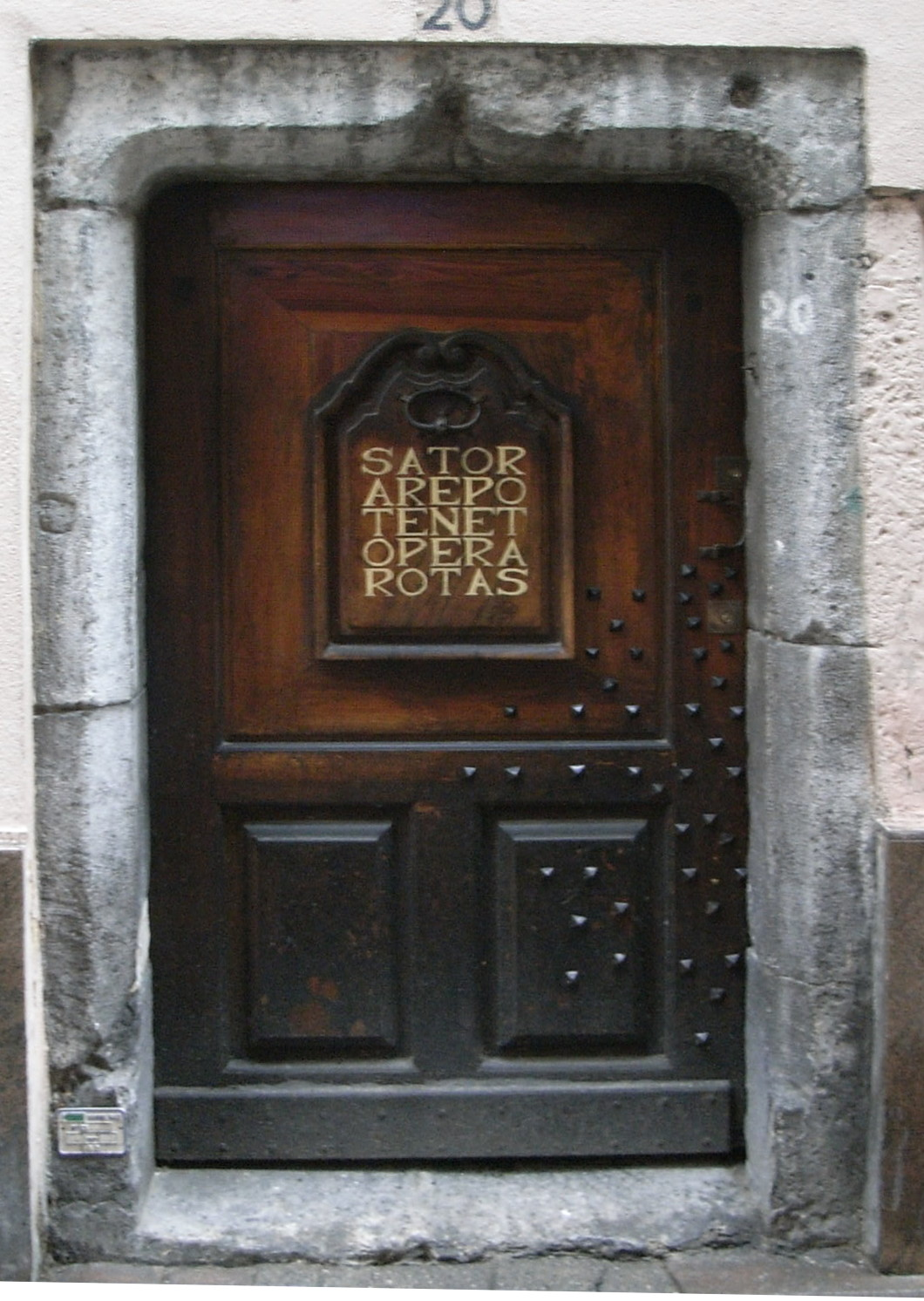
Sator form of the square on a door in Grenoble, France

The most direct sentence translation is: "The sower (or, farmer) Arepo holds the wheels with care (or, with care the wheels)". Similar translations include: "The farmer Arepo works his wheels", or "Arepo the sower (sator) guides (tenet) the wheel (rotas) with skill (opera)".

Some academics, such as French historian Jules Quicherat, believe the square should be read in a boustrophedon style (i.e. in alternating directions). The boustrophedon style, which in Greek means "as the ox plows", emphasizes the agricultural aspect of the text of the square. Such a reading when applied to the SATOR-form square, and repeating the central word TENET, gives SATOR OPERA TENET – TENET OPERA SATOR, which has been very loosely interpreted as: "as ye sow, so shall ye reap", while some believe the square should be read as just three words – SATOR OPERA TENET, which they loosely translate as: "The Creator (the author of all things) maintains his works"; both of which could imply Graeco-Roman Stoic and/or Pythagorean origins.

British academic Duncan Fishwick observes that the translation from the boustrophedon approach fails when applied to a ROTAS-form square; however, Belgian scholar Paul Grosjean reversed the boustrophedon rule on the ROTAS form (i.e. starting on the right-hand side instead of the left) to get SAT ORARE POTEN, which loosely translates into the Jewish call to prayer, "are you able to pray enough?".

=== Arepo interpretations ===
The word AREPO is a hapax legomenon, appearing nowhere else in attested Latin literature. Some academics believe it is likely a proper name, or possibly a theophoric name, that was adapted from a non-Latin word or was invented specifically for the Sator square. French historian Jerome Carcopino believed that it came from the Gaulish word for a 'plough'; however, this has been discounted by other academics. (Note: Duncan Fishwick showed that this translation into plough was based on a "faulty knowledge of Latin, if not of Greek", and Fishwick's view was reinforced by French historian Robert Étienne.) American ancient legal historian David Daube believed that AREPO represented a Hebrew or Aramaic rendition of the ancient Greek for alpha (Ἄλφα) and omega (ω), bespeaking the "Alpha-Omega" concept (cf. Isaiah 44.6, and Revelation 1:8) from early Judeo-Christianity. J. Gwyn Griffiths contended that the term AREPO came, via Alexandria, from the attested Egyptian name "Hr-Hp" (ḥr ḥp), which he took to mean "the face of Apis". In 1983, Serbian-American scholar Miroslav Marcovich proposed the term AREPO as a Latinized abbreviation of Harpocrates (or "Horus-the-child"), god of the rising sun, also called Γεωργός `Aρπον (Georgós Arpon), which Marcovich suggests corresponds to SATOR AREPO. This would translate the square as: "The sower Horus/Harpocrates keeps in check toils and tortures".

Duncan Fishwick, among other academics, believed that AREPO was simply a residual word that was required to complete what is a complex and sophisticated palindrome (which Fishwick believed was embedded with hidden Jewish symbolism, per the "Jewish Symbol" origin theory below), and to expect more from the word was unreasonable from its likely Jewish creators.

=== Further anagrams ===
Attempts have been made to discover "hidden meanings" by the anagrammatic method of rearranging the letters of which the square is composed.

- In 1883, German historian Gustav Fritsch reformed the letters to discover an invocation to Satan:
  SATAN, ORO TE, PRO ARTE A TE SPERO
  SATAN, TER ORO TE, OPERA PRAESTO
  SATAN, TER ORO TE, REPARATO OPES
- French historian Guillaume de Jerphanion catalogued examples that were known formulas for an exorcism such as:
  RETRO SATANA, TOTO OPERE ASPER, and the prayers
  ORO TE PATER, ORO TE PATER, SANAS
  O PATER, ORES PRO AETATE NOSTRA
  ORA, OPERARE, OSTENTA TE PASTOR
- In 1887, Polish ethnographer Oskar Kolberg amended the strict anagrammatic approach by using abbreviations and thus deduced from the 25 letters of the Sator Square the 36 letters of the monastic rule: SAT ORARE POTEN (TER) ET OPERA(RE) R(ATI)O T(U)A S(IT), which he considered an ancient rule of the Benedictines; French historian Gaston Letonnelier made a similar approach in 1952 to get the Christian prayer: SAT ORARE POTEN(TIA) ET OPER(A) A ROTA S(ERVANT), which translates as: "Prayer is our strength and will save us from the wheel (of fate?)".
- In 1935, German art historian Kuno von Hardenberg believed he discovered the relief the Rose of Sharon gave to Saint Peter for the sin of his denial of Christ, with the anagram PETRO ET REO PATET ROSA SARONA, which translates as "For Peter even guilty the rose of Sharon is open"; academics refuted his interpretation.
- In 2003, American historian Rose Mary Sheldon listed some of the many diverse sentences that can be produced from anagrams of the square including her favorite: APATOR NERO EST, which would translate as saying that the Roman emperor Nero was the result of a virgin birth.

== Origin and meaning ==
The origin and meaning of the square has eluded a definitive academic consensus even after more than a century of study. In 1938, British classical historian Donald Atkinson said the square occupied the "mysterious region where religion, superstition, and magic meet, where words, numbers, and letters are believed, if properly combined, to exert power over the processes of nature". Even by 2003, American academic Rose Mary Sheldon called it "one of the oldest unsolved word puzzles in the world". In 2018, American ancient classical historian Megan O'Donald still noted that "most interpretations of the ROTAS square have failed to gain consensus" due in part to difficulty reconciling the archeological evidence with the square's later adoption as a religious and magical object.

=== Christian symbol ===
==== Adoption by Christians ====
Irrespective of the theory of its origin, the evidence that the Sator square, particularly in its SATOR form, became adopted into Christian imagery is not disputed by academics. Academics note the repeated association of Christ with the "sower" (or SATOR), and the words of the Sator square have been discovered in Christian settings even in very early medieval times, including:

- Jesuit historian Jean Daniélou claimed that the third-century Bishop Irenaeus of Lyons (c. AD 200) knew of the square and had written of "Him who joined the beginning with the end, and is the Lord of both, and has shown forth the plough at the end". Some academics link Irenaeus with creating the association of the five words in the square to the five wounds of Christ.
- The Berlin State Museum houses a sixth-century bronze amulet from Asia Minor that has two fish turned toward one another on one side, and a Sator square in Greek characters in a checkerboard pattern on the other side. Written above the square is the word "ICHTHUS", the Greek for fish but also a direct term for Christ; it is the earliest known Christian annotated Sator Square.
- An illustration in an early Byzantine bible gives the baptismal names of the three Magi as being: ATOR, SATOR, and PERATORAS.
- In Cappadocia, in the time of Constantine VII (913–959), the shepherds of the Nativity of Jesus are named: SATOR, AREPON, and TENETON.

The Sator square appears in diverse Christian communities, such as in Abyssinia where in the Ethiopian Book of the Dead, the individual nails in Christ's cross were called: Sador, Alador, Danet, Adera, Rodas. These are likely derived from even earlier Coptic Christian works that also ascribe the wounds of Christ and the nails of the cross with names that resemble the five words from the square.

While there is little doubt among academics that Christians adopted the square, it was not clear that they had originated the symbol.

==== Paternoster theory ====
Lord's Prayer anagram from the 25 letters of the square, including the Alpha and Omega positioning of the residual As and Os. There is an alternative layout proposed with the As and Os positioned at the extreme ends of the Paternoster cross, and a Jewish option with the letters laid out in an X-shape (i.e. tau).

During 1924 to 1926, three people separately discovered, (Note: Most notable and impactful of the three was German priest Felix Grosser, who published in 1926; German historian Christian Frank published in 1924, and Swedish historian Sigurd Agrell published in 1927.) or rediscovered, that the square could be used to write the name of the Lord's Prayer, the "Paternoster", twice and intersecting in a cross form (see image opposite). The remaining residual letters (two As and two Os) could be placed in the four quadrants of the cross and would represent the Alpha and Omega that are established in Christian symbolism. The positioning of the As and Os was further supported by the fact that the position of the Ts in the Sator square formed the points of a cross – there are obscure references in the Epistle of Barnabas to T being a symbol of the cross – and that the As and Os also lay in the four quadrants of this cross. At the time of this discovery, the earliest known Sator square was from the fourth century, further supporting the dating of the Christian symbolism inherent in the Paternoster theory. Academics considered the Christian origins of the square to be largely resolved.

With the subsequent discovery of Sator squares at Pompeii, dating pre-79 AD, the Paternoster theory began to lose support, even among notable supporters such as French historian Guillaume de Jerphanion. Jerphanion noted that (1) it was improbable that many Christians were present at Pompeii, (2) first-century Christians would have written the square in Greek and not Latin, (3) the Christian concepts of Alpha and Omega only appear after the first century, (4) the symbol of the cross only appears from about AD 130–131, and (5) cryptic Christian symbols only appeared during the persecutions of the third century.

Jérôme Carcopino claimed the Pompeii squares were added at a later date by looters. The lack of any disturbance to the volcanic deposits at the palestra, however, meant that this was unlikely, and the Paternoster theory as a proof of Christian origination lost much of its academic support.

Regardless of its Christian origins, many academics considered the Paternoster discovery as being a random occurrence to be mathematically impossible. Several examined this mathematical probability including German historian Friedrich Focke and British historian Hugh Last, but without reaching a conclusion. A 1987 computer analysis by William Baines derived a number of "pseudo-Christian formulae" from the square but Baines concluded it proved nothing.

=== Roman word puzzle ===
There is considerable contemporary academic support for the theory that the square originated as a Roman-era word puzzle. Italian historian Arsenio Frugoni found it written in the margin of the Carme delle scolte modenesi beside the Roma-Amor palindrome, and Italian classicist Margherita Guarducci noted it was similar to the ROMA OLIM MILO AMOR two-dimensional acrostic word puzzle that was also found at Pompeii (see Wiktionary for details on the Pompeiian graffito), and at Ostia and Bolonia. Similarly, another ROTAS-form square scratched into a Roman-era wall in the basement of the Basilica di Santa Maria Maggiore was found alongside the Roma-Amor, and the Roma-Summus-Amor, palindromes. Duncan Fishwick noted the "composition of palindromes was, in fact, a pastime of Roman landed gentry". American classical epigraphist Rebecca Benefiel noted that by 2012, Pompeii had yielded more than 13,000 separate inscriptions and that the house of Publius Paquius Proculus (where a square was found) had more than 70 pieces of graffiti alone.

A 1969 computer study by Charles Douglas Gunn started with a Roma-Amor square and found 2,264 better versions, of which he considered the Sator square to be the best. The square's origin as a word puzzle solved the problem of AREPO (a word that appears nowhere else in classical writing), as being a necessary component to complete the palindrome.

Fishwick still considered this interpretation unproven and clarified that the apparent discovery of the Roma-Amor palindrome written beside the 1954 discovery of a square on a tile at Aquincum was incorrectly translated (if anything it supported the square as a charm). Fishwick, and others, consider the key failing of the Roman puzzle theory of origin is the lack of any explanation as to why the square would later become so strongly associated with Christianity, and with being a medieval charm. Some argue that this can be bridged if considered as a Pythagorean-Stoic puzzle creation.

In 2018, Megan O'Donnell argued that the square is less of a pure word puzzle but more a piece of Latin Roman graffito that should be read figuratively as a wheel (i.e. the ROTAS), and that the textual-visual interplay had parallels with other forms of graffito found in Pompeii, some of which later became adopted as charms.

=== Jewish symbol ===
The central cross created by the vertical and horizontal TENET words, has both Christian and Jewish symbolism (e.g. the "tau cross", or the Hebrew tau "+" symbol). It also parallels the Roman system of Cardo and Decumanus, being central road crosses through towns.

Some prominent academics, including British-Canadian ancient Roman scholar Duncan Fishwick, American ancient legal historian David Daube, and British ancient historian Mary Beard, consider the square as being likely of Jewish origin.

Fishwick notes that the failings of the Paternoster theory (above) are resolved when looked at from a Jewish perspective. Large numbers of Latin-speaking Jews had been settled in Pompeii, and their affinity for cryptic and mystical word symbols was well known. The Alpha and Omega concept appears much earlier in Judaism (Ex. 3.14; Is. 41.4, and 44.6), and the letters "aleph" and "tau" are used in the Talmud as symbols of totality. The Ts of TENET may be explained not as Christian crosses, but as a Latin form of the Jewish "tau" salvation symbol (from Ezekiel 9.4), and its archaic form (+ or X) appears regularly on ossuaries of both Hellenistic and early Roman times. Fishwick highlights the central position of the letter N, as Jews attached significance to the utterance of the "Name" (or nomen).

In addition, Fishwick believes a Jewish origin provides a satisfactory explanation for the Paternoster cross (or X) as the configuration is an archaic Jewish "tau" (+ or X). Fishwick draws attention to some liturgical prayers in Judaism, where several prayers refer to "Our Father". None of these liturgical prayers, however, can be dated to before Jesus. Fishwick concludes that the translations of the words ROTAS OPERA TENET AREPO SATOR are irrelevant, except to the extent that they make some sense and thereby hide a Jewish cryptic charm, and to require them to mean more is "to expect the impossible". The motivation for the creation square might have been the Jewish pogroms of AD 19 or AD 49; however, it fell into disuse only to be revived later by Christians facing their own persecution, and who appreciated its hidden Paternoster and Alpha and Omega symbolism, but who focused on the SATOR form (which emphasized the "sower", which was associated with Christ).

Research in 2006 by French classical scholar Nicolas Vinel drew on recent discoveries on the mathematics of ancient magic squares to propose that the square was a "Jewish cryptogram using Pythagorean arithmetic". Vinel decoded several Jewish concepts in the square, including the reason for AREPO, and was able to explain the word SAUTRAN that appears beside the square that was discovered on the palestra column in Pompeii. Vinel addressed a criticism of the Jewish origin theory – why would the Jews have then abandoned the symbol? – by noting the Greek texts that they also abandoned (e.g. the Septuagint) in favor of Hebrew versions.

=== Other theories ===
The amount of academic research published on the Rotas-Sator square is regarded as being considerable (and even described by one source as "immense"); American academic Rose Mary Sheldon attempted to catalog and review the most prominent works in a 2003 paper published in Cryptologia. Among the more diverse but less supported theories Sheldon recorded were:

- Several German academics have written on the links of the square to Pythagoreanism and Stoicism, including philologist Hildebrecht Hommel, historian Wolfgang Christian Schneider, and Heinz Hoffman, among others. Schneider believed the square was an important link between Etruscan religion and Stoic academic philosophy. Hommel believed that in the Stoic tradition, the Ephesian word AREPO would be discarded, and the square would be read in the boustrophedon style as SATOR OPERA TENET, TENET OPERA SATOR, translating as "The Creator preserves his works". German scholar Ulrich Ernst writing the Sator square's entry in The Encyclopedia of Christianity found this theory persuasive, but Miroslav Marcovich refuted the translation.
- Several academics link the square to Gnostic origins, such as Jean Doignon, Gustav Maresch, Adolfo Omodeo, and Hildebrecht Hommel. English egyptogolist J. Gwyn Griffiths explains AREPO as a personal name derived from the Egyptian name "Hr-Hp", and sources the square to an Alexandrine origin where a gnostic tradition employed acrostics.
- Some academics link the square to Orphic cults, including Serbian historian Milan Budimir who linked the Greek form of AREPO to the name Orpheus.
- Italian academic Adolfo Omodeo linked the square to Mithraic origins as the Roman-era discoveries were in military locations with whom it was popular, while academic historian Walter O. Moeller attempted to derive a Mithraic relationship using perceived mathematical patterns in the square, but his arguments were not considered convincing by other academics.
- Norwegian philologist Samson Eitrem took the last half of the square starting at N to get: "net opera rotans", which translates as "She spins her works", interpreting it to be a feminine being (i.e. Hecate), a demon, or even the square itself rotating on its TENET spokes, thus giving a peasant Italian pagan origin with the square as a wind indicator.
- Some academics such as Swiss archeologist Waldemar Deonna have proposed that it is a numerical number square, which would also imply a Semitic origin. A significant issue is that the square is in Latin, and Romans did not have the ciphered number system of the Greeks or the Semites. However, if the letters are transliterated to Greek, and then assigned ciphered numbers, the word TENET can be rendered as 666, the number of the beast. Walter O. Moeller analyzed the resultant numerical combinations to assert that the square was made by Mithraic numerologists.
- In 1925, Zatzman interpreted the square as a Hebraic or Aramaic apotropaic formula against the devil, and translated the square to read: "Satan Adama Tabat Amada Natas".
- In 1958, French historian Paul-Louis Couchoud proposed a novel interpretation as the square being a device for working out wind directions.

== Magical and medical associations ==
In 2003, Rose Mary Sheldon noted: "Long after the fall of Rome, and long after the general public had forgotten about classical word games, the square survived among people who might not even read Latin. They continued to use it as a charm against illness, evil and bad luck. By the end of the Middle Ages, the 'prophylactic magic' of the square was firmly established in the superstition of Italy, Serbia, Germany, and Iceland, and eventually even crossed to North America". The square appears in versions of several popular magical manuscripts from the early and late Middle Ages, magical text such as the Tabula Smaragdina and the Clavicula Salomonis.

Medieval German Sator square fire disks

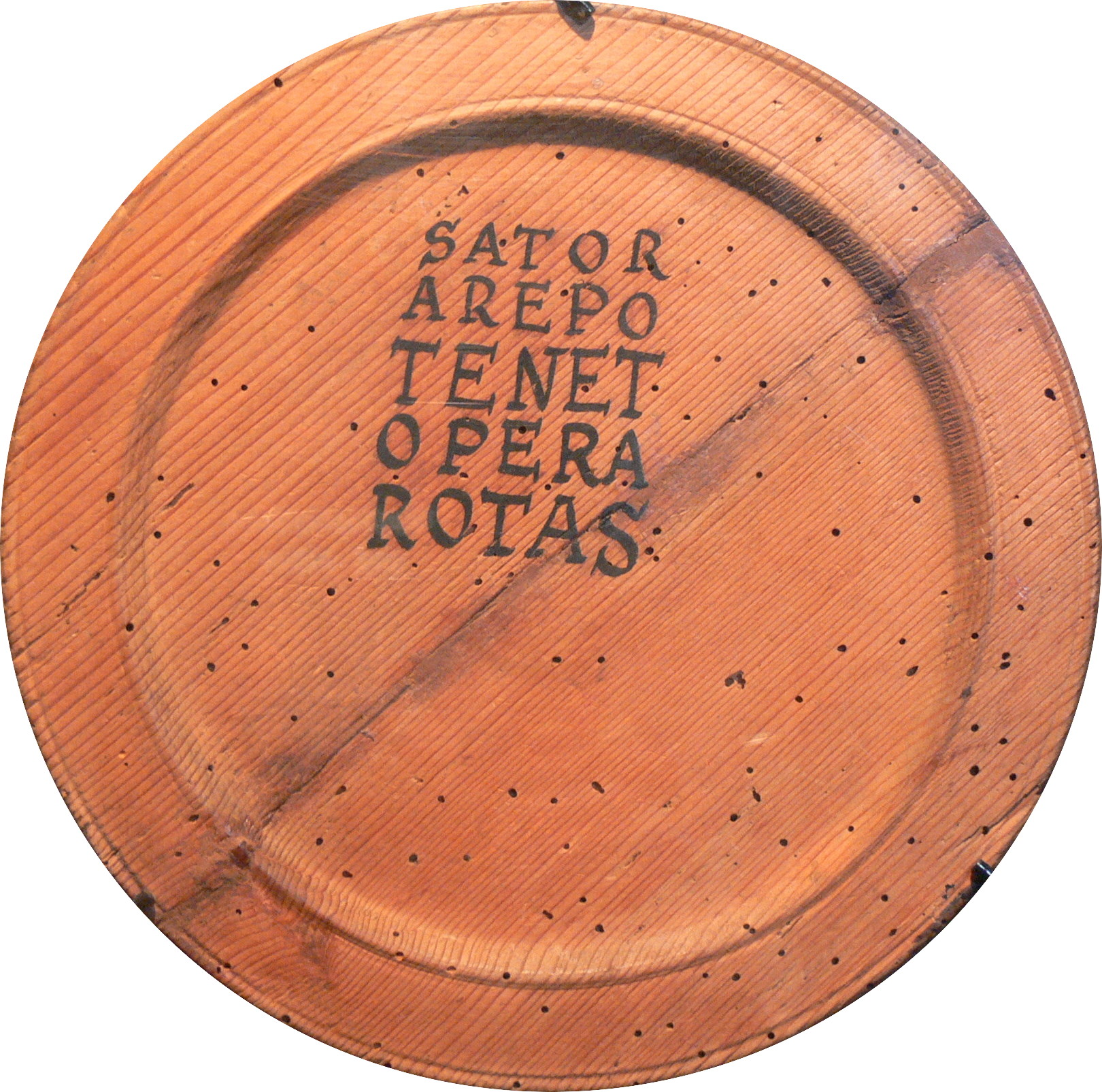
Oberhausmuseum

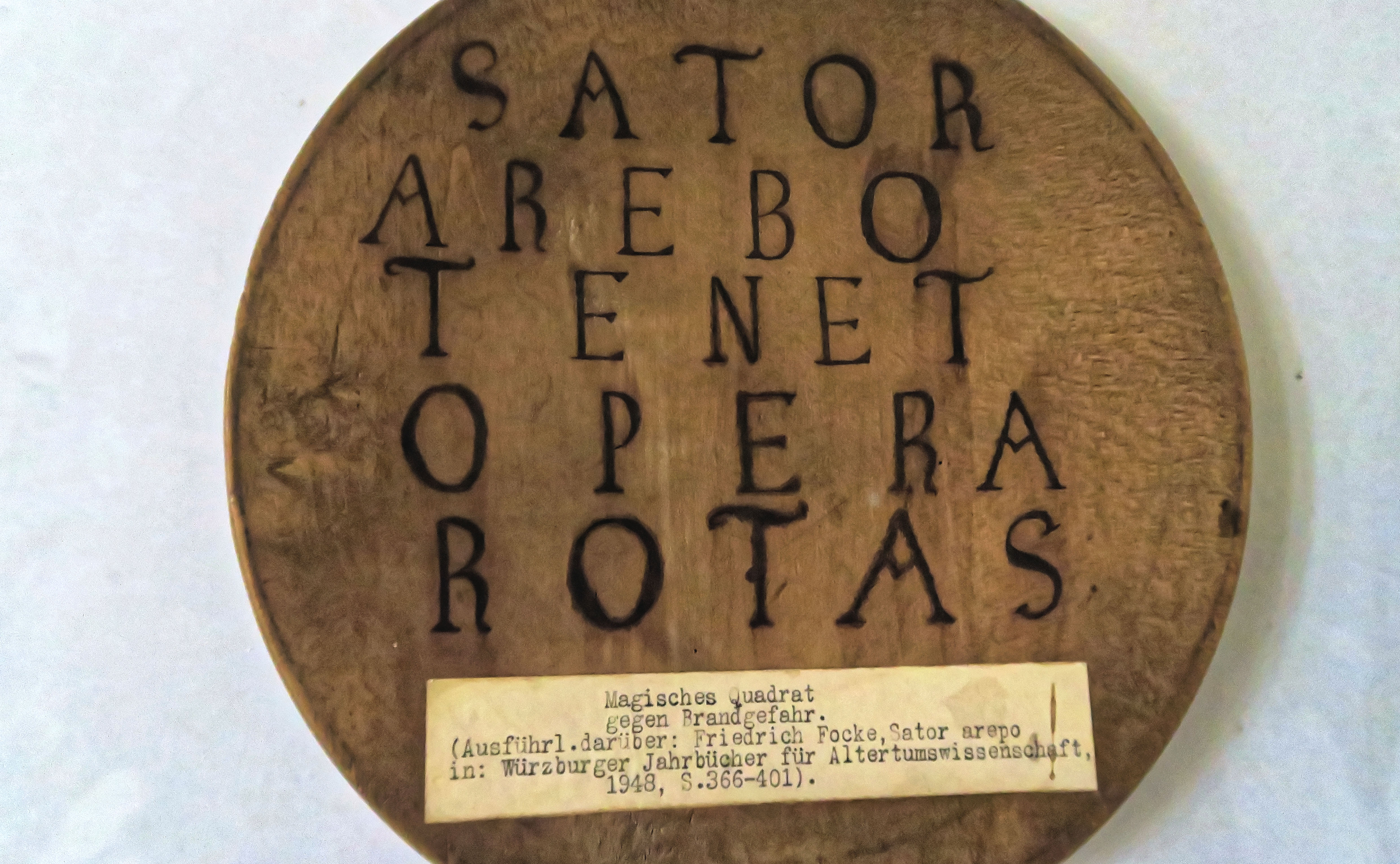
State and City Library, Augsburg

In Germany in the Middle Ages, the square was inscribed on disks that were then thrown into fires to extinguish them. An edict in 1743 by Duke Ernest Auguste of Saxe-Weimar-Eisenach required all settlements to make Sator square disks to combat fires. By the fifteenth century the square was being used as a touchstone against fire at the Château de Chinon and Château de Jarnac in France.

The square appears as a remedy during labour in the twelfth-century Latin medical text the Trotula, and was widely cited as a cure for dog bites and rabies in medieval Europe; in both cases, the remedy/cure is administered by eating bread inscribed with the words of the square. By the sixteenth century, the use of the square to cure insanity and fever was being documented in books such as De Varia Quercus Historia (1555) by Jean du Choul, and De Rerum Varietate (1557) by Gerolamo Cardano. Jean du Choul describes a case where a person from Lyon recovered from insanity after eating three crusts of bread inscribed with the square. After the meal, the person then recited five paternosters for the five wounds of Christ, linking to the Christian imagery believed encoded into the square.

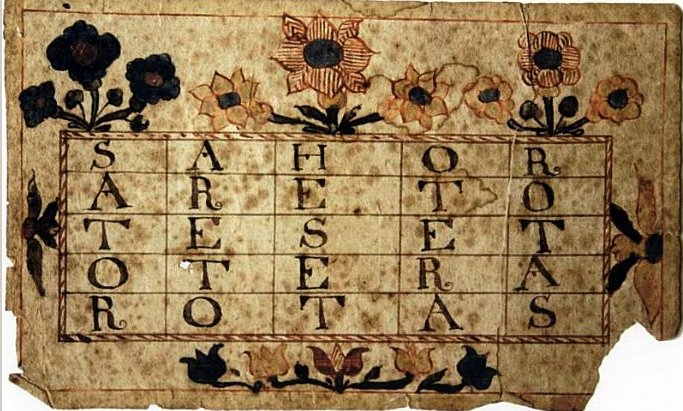
A Pennsylvania Dutch talisman dating to ca. 1790

Scholars have found medieval Sator-based charms, remedies, and cures, for a diverse range of applications from childbirth, to toothaches, to love potions, to ways of warding off evil spells, and even to determine whether someone was a witch. Richard Cavendish notes a medieval manuscript in the Bodleian says: "Write these [five sator] words on in parchment with the blood of a Culver [pigeon] and bear it in thy left hand and ask what thou wilt and thou shalt have it. fiat." Other examples include Bosnia, where the square was used as a remedy for aquaphobia, and in Iceland, it was etched into the fingernails to cure jaundice.

There are examples from the nineteenth century in South America, where the Sator square was used as a cure for dog bites and snake-bites in Brazil, and in enclaves of German settlers (or mountain whites) in the Allegheny Mountains who used the square to prevent fire, stop fits, and prevent miscarriages. The Sator square features in eighteenth-century books on Pow-wow folk medicine of the Pennsylvania Dutch, such as The Long Lost Friend.

== Notable examples ==
=== Roman ===
- The oldest Sator square was found in November 1936, in ROTAS form, etched into column number LXI at the Palestra Grande near the amphitheatre of Pompeii (CIL IV 8623). Graffiti associated with the particular columns predates the AD 62 Pompeii earthquake, making it the oldest known square. It also has additional graffiti just below it, with the words SAUTRAN and VALE (CIL IV 8622a-b).
- Another Sator square was also found in October 1925, in ROTAS form, etched onto the wall in a bathroom of the house of Publius Paquius Proculus (Reg I, Ins 7, 1), also at Pompeii (CIL IV 8123). The style of the house, which is associated with Nero's reign, dated the square to between AD 50 and AD 79 (the destruction of the city).
- A Sator square was found in 1954, in ROTAS form, etched onto a roof tile of the second-century Roman Imperial governor's house for Pannonia Inferior at Aquincum, near Budapest, Hungary. There has been debate over whether a second partial inscription found beside the square is part of the Roma-Amor palindrome (thus affirming the Roman puzzle origin theory), but it seems unlikely.
Roman second-century ROTAS-form squares

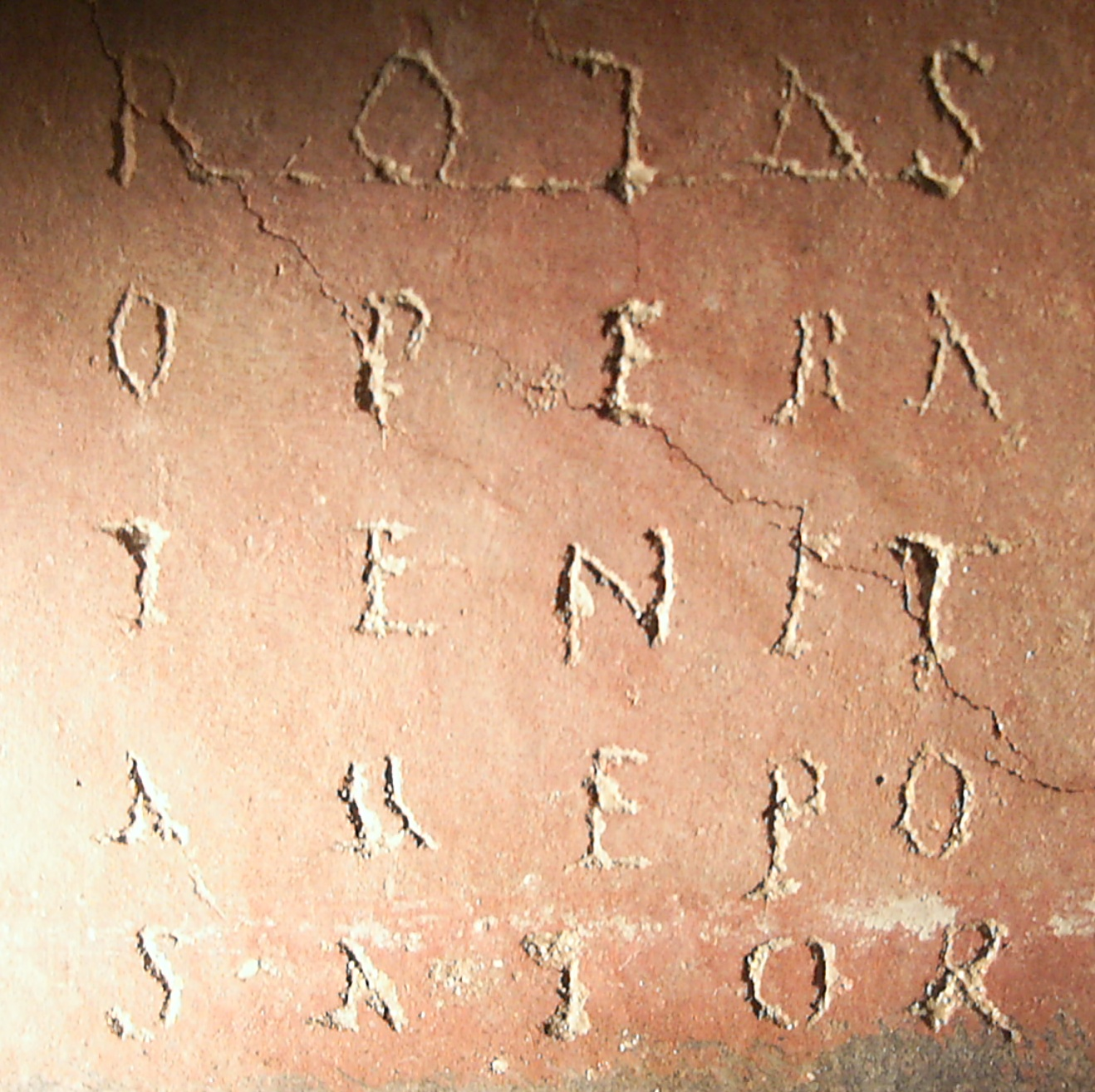
Cirencester, England

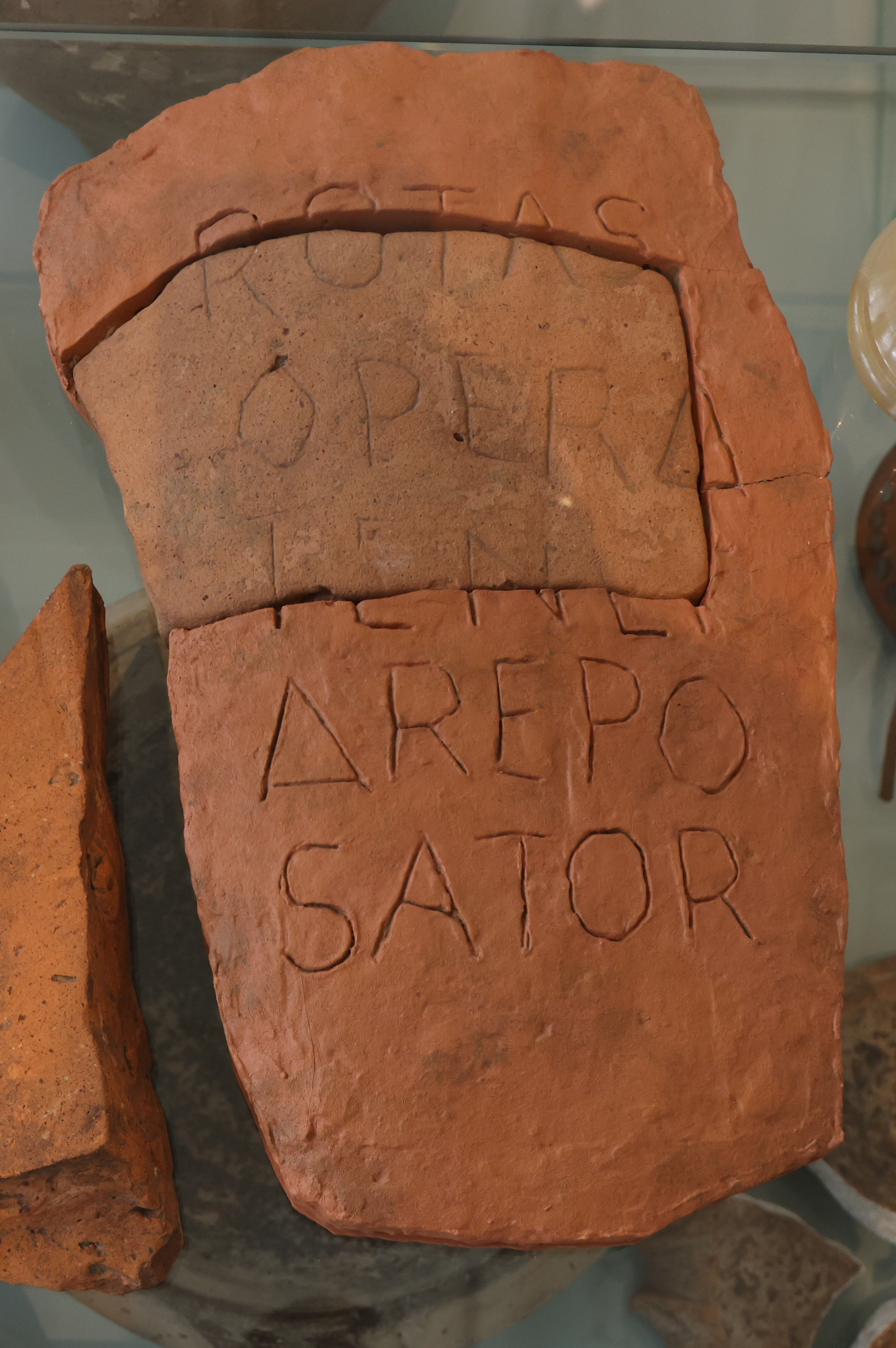
Manchester, England

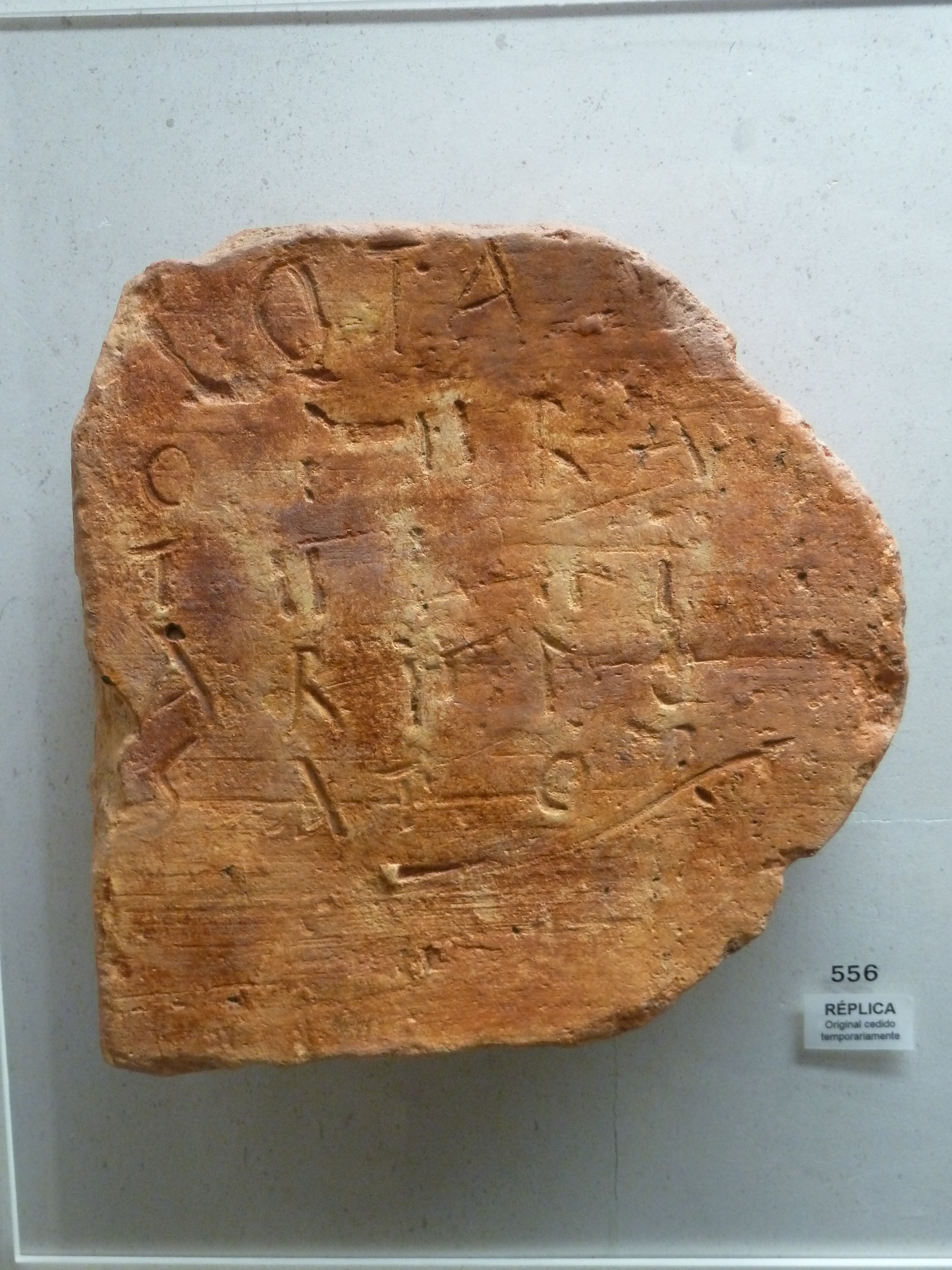
Conímbriga Portugal

- A Sator square was found in 1978, in ROTAS form, etched on a fragment of Roman pottery at a Roman site at Manchester that was dated circa AD 185.
- Four Sator squares were found in 1931–32, all in ROTAS form, etched on the walls of military buildings, at Dura-Europos in Syria, dated circa AD 200.
- A Sator square was found in 1868, in ROTAS form, scratched onto a plaster wall in the Roman Britain settlement of Corinium Dobunnorum at Cirencester.
- A Sator square was found in 1971, in ROTAS form, etched onto an unfired brick at the Roman city of Conímbriga in Portugal that was dated from the second century.
- A Sator square was found in 1966–71, in ROTAS form, scratched into a Roman-era wall during excavations of the Basilica di Santa Maria Maggiore in Rome (along with the Roma-Amor, and the Rome Summus Amor palindromes).

=== Early medieval ===
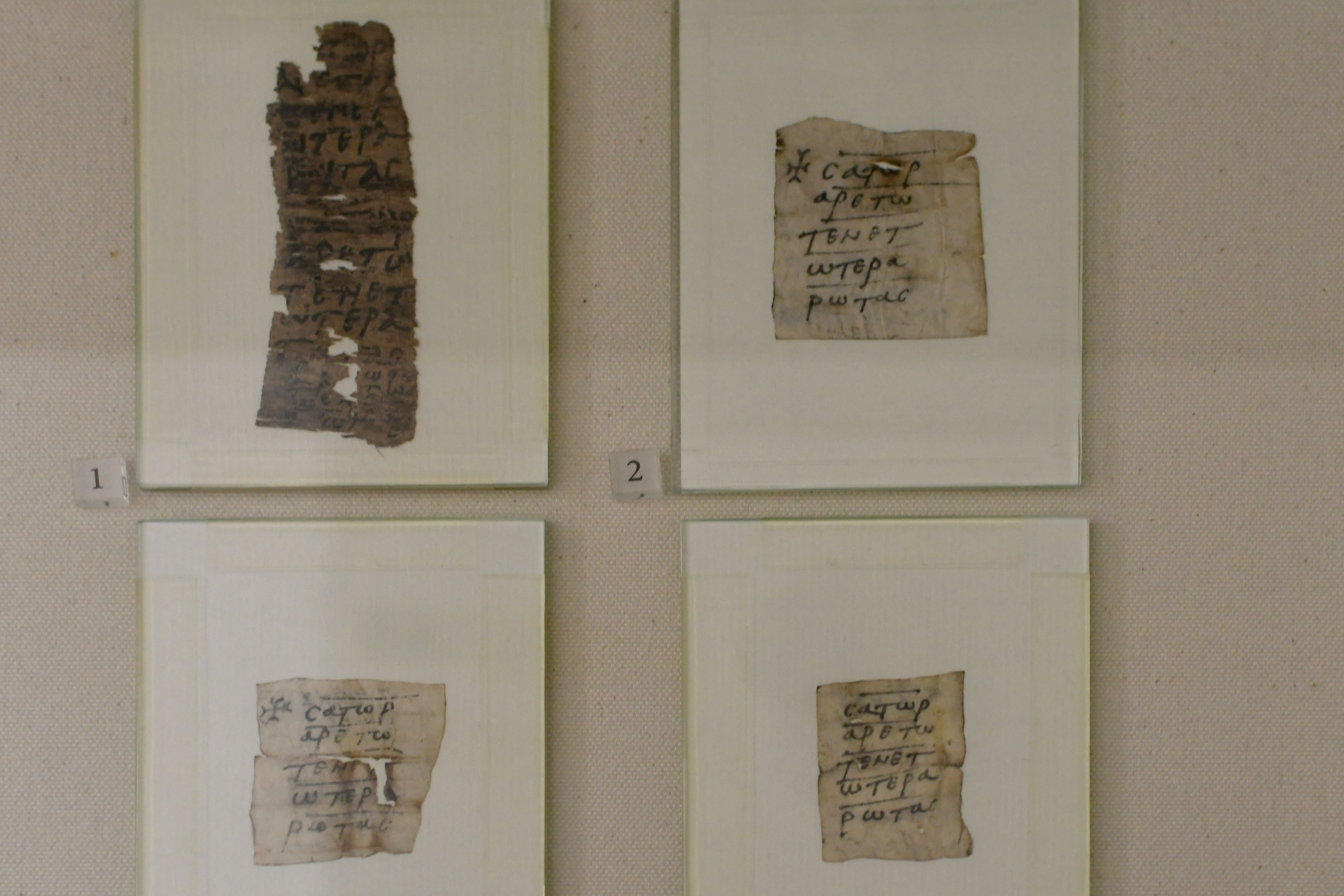
Examples of Coptic Sator square amulets, Papyrus Museum, Vienna

- The earliest Sator square post-Roman times was the 1899 discovery of a ROTAS-form square inscribed on a Coptic papyrus by German historians Adolph Erman and Fritz Krebs in the Berlin Papyrus Collection of the Berlin State Museums (then the Königlichen Museen); it has no other explicit Christian imagery.
- The earliest Sator square with explicit additional Christian imagery is a sixth-century bronze amulet from Asia Minor that has two fish turned toward one another on one side, and a Sator square in Greek characters in a checkerboard pattern on the other side. Written above the square is the word "ICHTHUS", which directly translates as a term for Christ. It is also in the Berlin State Museums.
- One of the earliest examples of a Sator square in a Christian church is the SATOR-form marble square on the facade of the circa AD 752 Benedictine Abbey of St Peter ad Oratorium, near Capestrano, in Italy.
- The earliest example from France is a SATOR-form square found in a Carolingian Bible from AD 822 at the monastery of Saint-Germain-des-Prés. There are ninth- to tenth-century examples in Codex 384 from Monte Cassino, and a square was found written into the margin of a work titled Versus de cavenda Venere et vino found, which is part of Codex 1.4 of the Capitolare di Modena.
- One of the earliest examples of the square being applied to medical beliefs is from the twelfth-century Latin medical textbooks the Trotula, where the translated text advises: "[98] Or let these names be written on cheese and butter: + sa. e. op. ab. z. po. c. zy. e pe. pa. pu c. ac. sator arepo tenet os pera rotas and let them be given to eat". In a similar vein, a thirteenth-century parchment from Aurillac offers a Sator-square chant for women in childbirth.

=== Later medieval ===
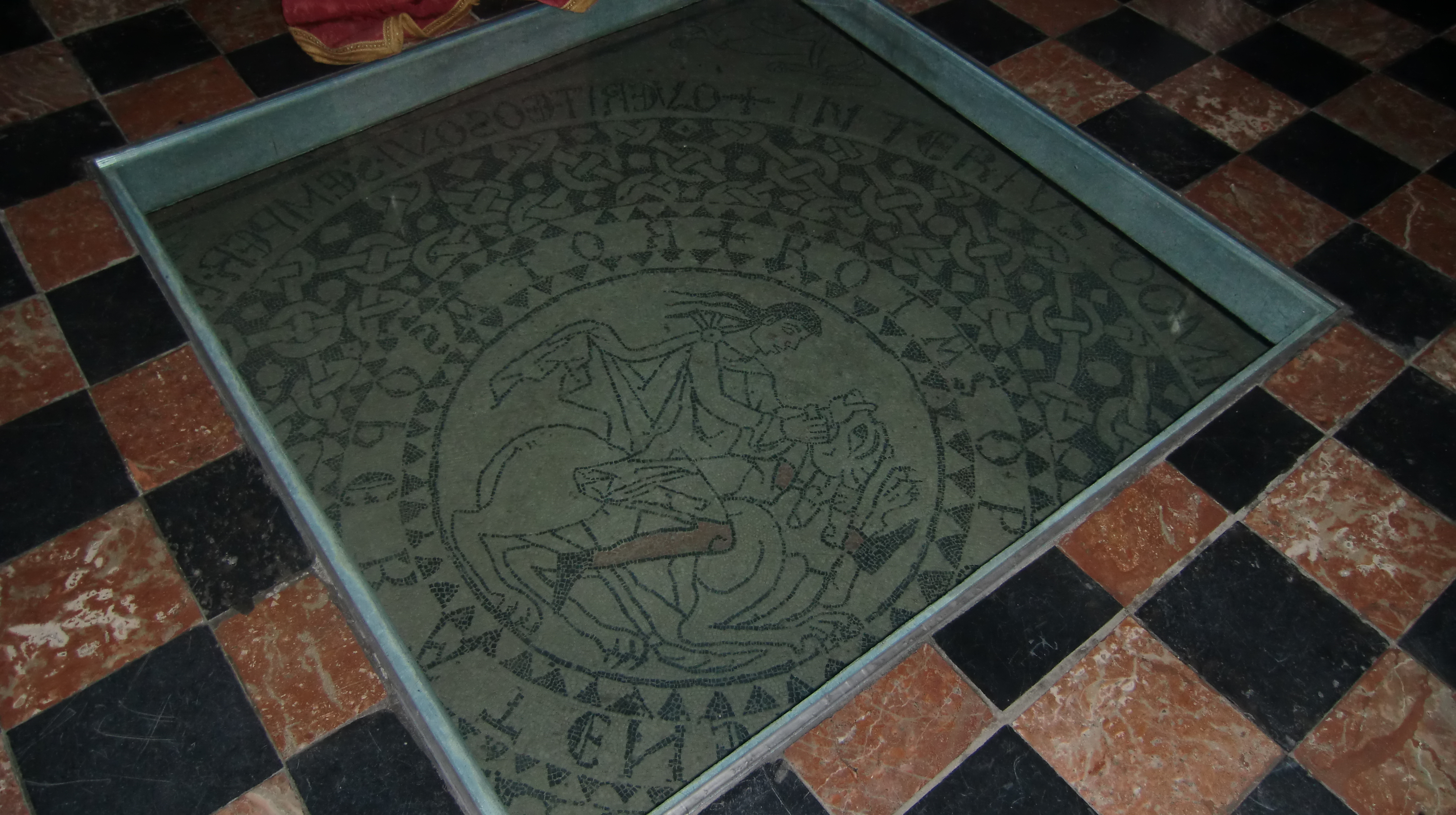
Samson and the Lion. A twelfth-century mosaic with the words of the square in a circle, Collegiate church of Saint Ursus, Aosta, Italy

- Twelfth-century French examples are found on the wall of the Eglise Saint Laurent at Château de Rochemaure, and in the keep of Château de Loches.
- A Sator square in SATOR form was found on a block set into the doorway facade of a fortified wall in the largely abandoned medieval fortress town of Oppède-le-Vieux, in France's Luberon; the old town itself dates from the twelfth or thirteenth century and was abandoned by the seventeenth century.
- Many medieval Italian towns and churches have squares. The twelfth-century church of San Giovanni Decollato in Pieve Terzagni in Cremona has fragments of a floor mosaic that included a square. Valvisciolo Abbey has letters forming five concentric rings, each one divided into five sectors. One appears on the exterior wall of the Duomo in Siena. Inside the church of Acquaviva Collecroce is a stone with the square in a ROTAS form. Others include the church of the Pieve of San Giovanni, the Collegiate church of Saint Ursus, the Cathedral of Ascoli Satriano, and the Church of San Lorenzo in Paggese in Marche.
- The square is found in diverse locations all over later medieval France, including fifteenth-century examples at the Château de Chinon, the Château de Jarnac, as well as in the courthouse in Valbonnais.
- A Sator square in SATOR form is in the medieval Rivington Church in Lancashire, England.
- The phrase appears on the rune stone Nä Fv1979;234 from Närke, Sweden, dated to the fourteenth century. It reads "sator arepo tenet" (untranscribed: "sator ¶ ar(æ)po ¶ tænæt). It also occurs in two inscriptions from Gotland (G 145 M and G 149 M), which contain the whole palindrome.

=== Other ===
- Lady Jane Francesa Wilde's anthology of Irish folklore, Ancient Legends Mystic Charms & Superstitions of Ireland (1888), includes the tale of a young girl who is enchanted by a poet using the spell of a Sator square written on a piece of paper in blood.
- The Sator square, with some letters changed, features in eighteenth-century books on Pow-wow folk medicine of the Pennsylvania Dutch, such as The Long Lost Friend (see image earlier).

== In popular culture ==
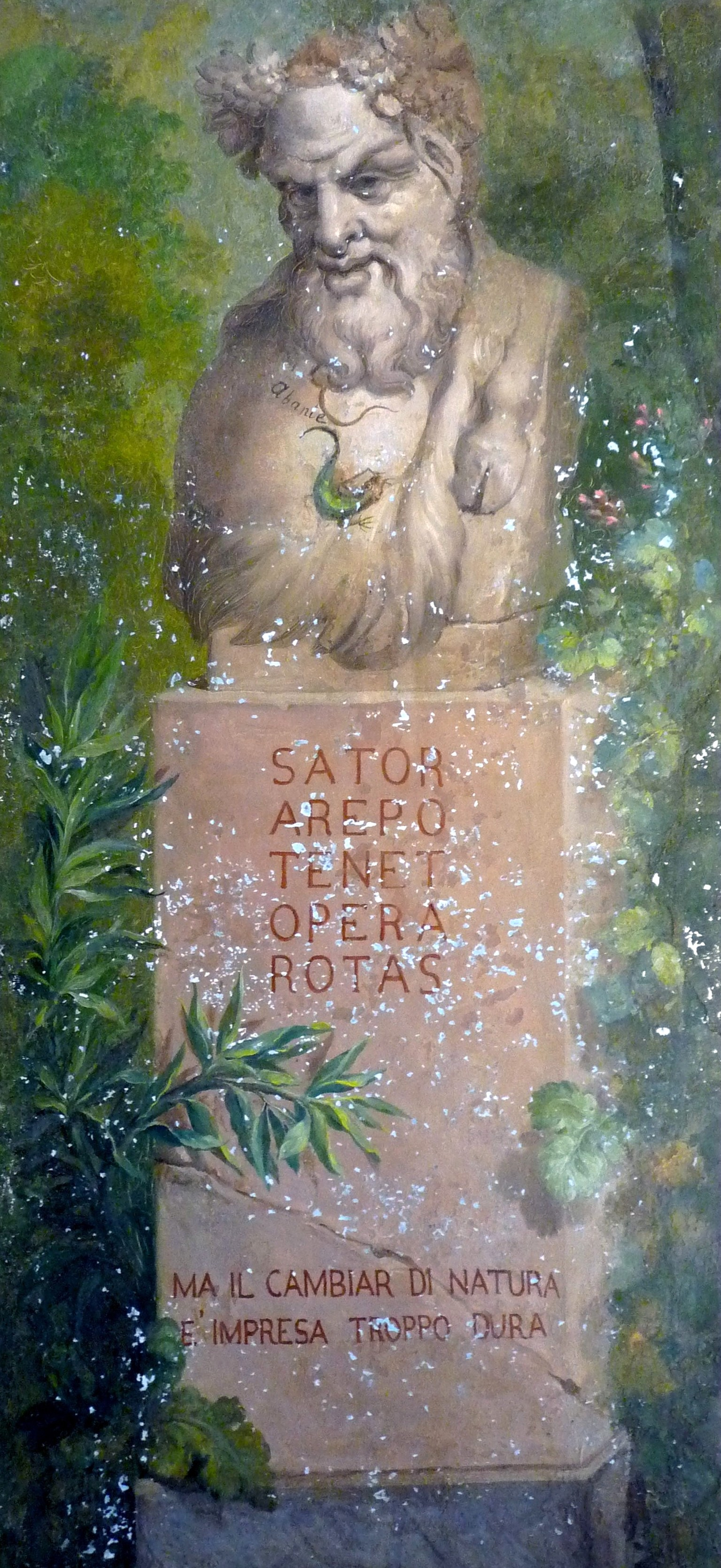
Filippo Balbi (circa 1860)

The Sator square has inspired many works in the arts, including some classical and contemporary composers such as works by Austrian composer Anton Webern and Italian composer Fabio Mengozzi, writers such as Brazilian writer Osman Lins (whose novel Avalovara (1973) follows the structure of the square), and painters such as American artist Dick Higgins with La Melancolia (1983), and American artist Gary Stephan with Sator Arepo Tenet Opera Rotas (1982).

Director Christopher Nolan's 2020 film Tenet has a story structure that mimics the square's concept of interlinked multiple directions of meaning through its exploration of time inversion, and incorporates all five of the names from the Sator square:

- Sator, the main antagonist of the film.
- Arepo, an unseen artist who created forged Goya drawings.
- Tenet, the title of the film and the name of a secret organization that works to save the world.
- Opera, wherein the opening scene is set at an opera house.
- Rotas, a security company owned by Andrei Sator.

American author Lawrence Watt-Evans notes that Sir Terry Pratchett named the main square in the fictional city of Ankh-Morpork "Sator Square", in a reference to the symbol. Watt-Evans notes that the Discworld series is full of other incidental references to unusual symbols and concepts.

== See also ==
- Abracadabra, a second-century Roman magic word
- Abraxas, a mystical word in Gnosticism
- Nipson anomēmata mē monan opsin, a fourth-century Byzantine palindrome
- Paser Crossword Stela – Ancient Egyptian stela
- The Book of the Sacred Magic of Abramelin the Mage, a medieval book that contains word squares
