= Rose Mary Sheldon =

Military and classical historian

Colonel Rose Mary Sheldon (born October 22, 1948) is an American professor and military and classical historian who held the Henry King Burgwyn, Jr. Chair of Military History at the Virginia Military Institute, where she taught from 1993 to 2019. She received her doctorate in ancient history from the University of Michigan, for which she won a National Intelligence Book award in 1987. In 1981, she became a fellow of the American Academy in Rome. She sat on the editorial boards of the Journal of Military History and International Journal of Intelligence and CounterIntelligence.

== Works ==
- Sheldon, Rose Mary (2004). Intelligence Activities in Ancient Rome: Trust in the Gods but Verify. Routledge. ISBN 978-1-135-77107-2.
- Sheldon, Rose Mary (2007). Spies of the Bible: espionage in Israel from the Exodus to the Bar Kokhba Revolt. Greenhill. ISBN 978-1853676369.
- Sheldon, R. M. (2008). Espionage in the Ancient World: An Annotated Bibliography of Books and Articles in Western Languages. McFarland. ISBN 978-0-7864-3768-9.
- Sheldon, Rose Mary (2012). Ambush: Surprise Attack in Ancient Greek Warfare. Casemate Publishers. ISBN 978-1-78303-648-6.
- Sheldon, Rose Mary (2018). Kill Caesar!: Assassination in the Early Roman Empire. Rowman & Littlefield. ISBN 978-1-5381-1489-6.

== See also ==
- List of fellows of the American Academy in Rome (1971–1990), Sheldon became a fellow in 1981
- Sator Square, a topic Sheldon has published on
- The Friedman Collection: An Analytical Guide
