= Trisulti Charterhouse =

Former Carthusian monastery or charterhouse in central Italy

Coordinates: 41°46′46″N 13°23′51″E

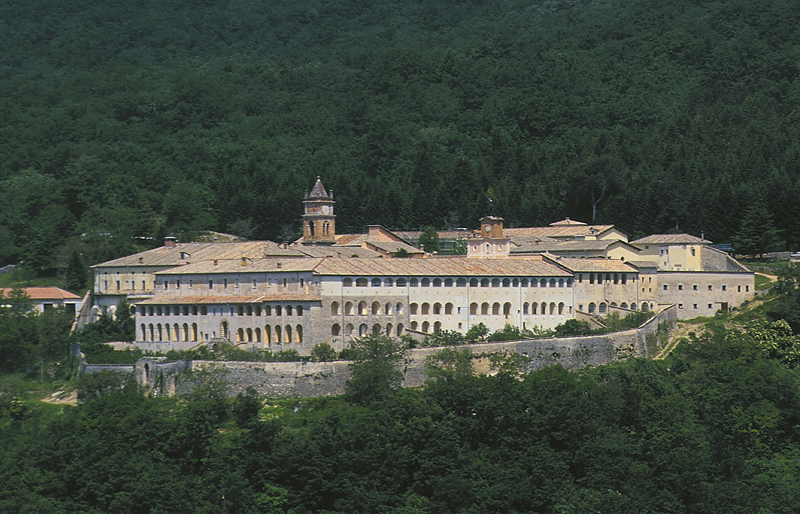
Trisulti Charterhouse

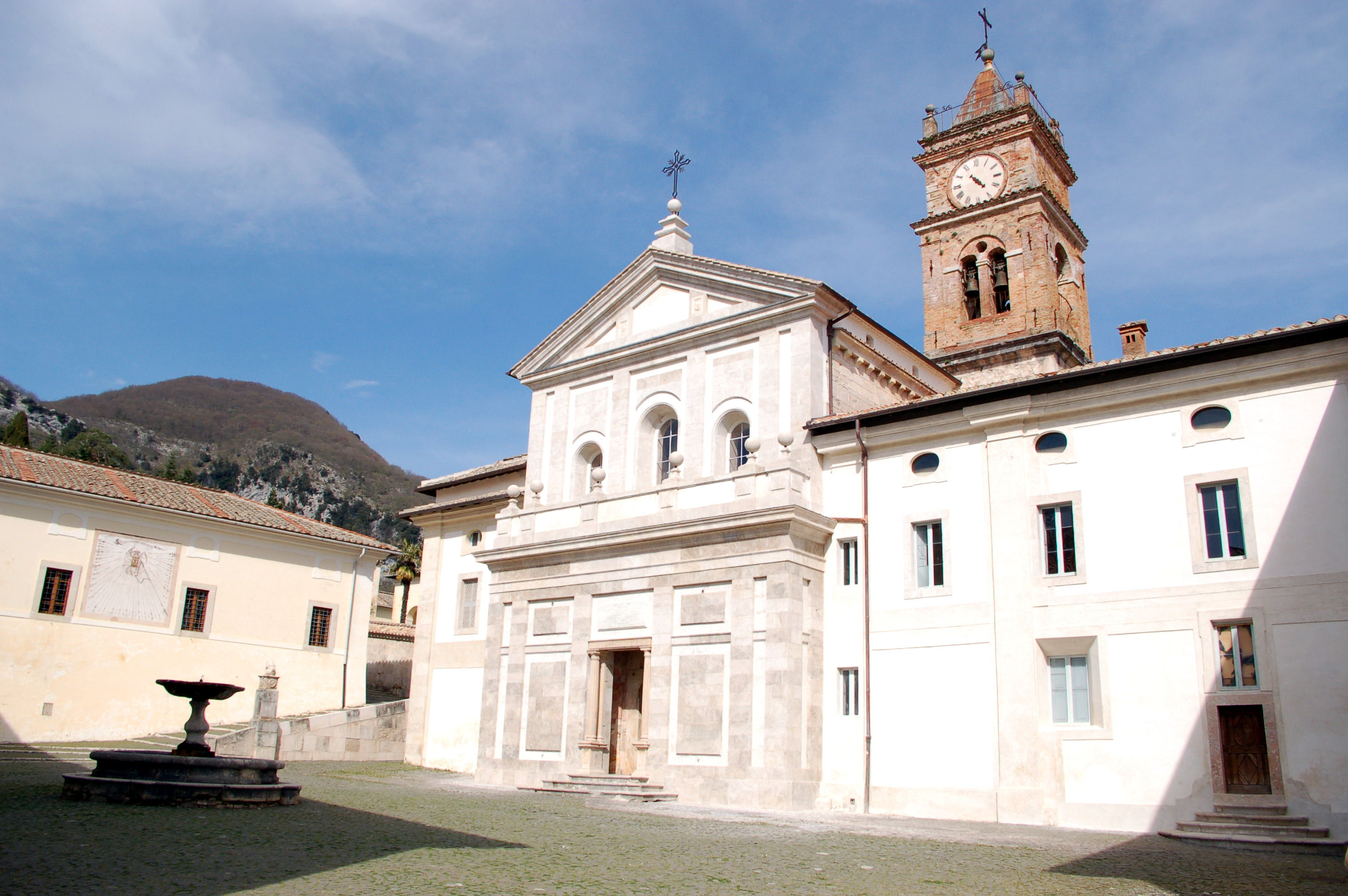
Façade of the abbey church

Trisulti Charterhouse (Italian: Certosa di Trisulti) is a former Carthusian monastery or charterhouse, now owned by the Cistercians, in Collepardo, province of Frosinone, central Italy. It is located on the slopes of Monte Rotonaria, a peak of the Monti Ernici, at 825 meters above sea level. It was consecrated in 1211, becoming a national monument in 1873.

== History ==
A first Benedictine abbey was founded in the site in 996 by Saint Dominic Abbot; some remains can be seen today not far from the current building. The latter was erected starting from 1204, on a more accessible location, by order of Pope Innocent III, who assigned it to the Carthusians. The abbey church, dedicated to Saint Bartholomew, was consecrated in 1211.

The name Trisulti could derive from Latin tres saltibus, meaning "at the three jumps": this was the name of a castle of the baronial Colonna family which commanded the three passes ("jumps") leading to Abruzzo, Rome and Latium.

The complex was enlarged and modified several times in the following centuries. The current appearance dates from an essentially Baroque restoration.

In 1947 the monastery was taken over by the Cistercian Congregation of Casamari Abbey and continues as a Cistercian monastery.

In 2018 the former White House Chief Strategist, Steve Bannon, announced plans to establish a "gladiator school" for aspiring right-wing politicians in the charterhouse. The Dignitatis Humanae Institute, founded by a European associate of Bannon's named Benjamin Harnwell, was evicted from the charterhouse by the Italian government after it was alleged that rent was not paid and Harnwell had obtained the lease fraudulently. In 2024, an Italian court ruled that the lease had been obtained correctly and all funds had been paid.

== Description ==
The abbey is surrounded by a massive line of walls. The entrance has a bust of Saint Bartholomew by Jacopo Lo Duca, a pupil of Michelangelo Buonarroti; this leads to a central square where there is a Romanesque-Gothic guesthouse, commonly known as the "Palace of Innocent III" (including a portico, a terrace and a library of 36,000 volumes), and the church of San Bartolomeo (St. Bartholomew).

== Church of San Bartolomeo ==
The church had originally been a tall narrow Gothic-style building, but was largely rebuilt as a Baroque one. The façade (1798) was designed by Paolo Posi. The interior, like other Carthusian churches, is divided by an iconostasis which sheltered the cloistered monks. The canvases depicting St John the Baptist and St Michael Archangel are copies replacing stolen originals. The finely carved door by Giuseppe Kofler is flanked by glass coffins of two martyrs.

There are two wooden choirs; dating from 1564 and 1688, they were both created by Carthusian masters.

The concave ceiling was frescoed with the Glory of Paradise (1683) by Giuseppe Caci. The main altarpiece depicts an Enthroned Madonna and Child with St Bartholomew and St Bruno by Vincenzo Manenti. On the walls are 19th century canvases depicting scenes from the bible with ovals depicting blessed and holy Carthusian monks by Filippo Balbi. There are also altarpieces by Giacomo Manco.

The complex also includes an 18th-century pharmacy, on two levels; it is decorated by trompe-l'œil frescoes and Grotteschi and contemporary furniture. The garden facing the pharmacy was once a botanic garden. The rooms have genre-themed frescoes by Filippo Balbi.

== See also ==
- List of Carthusian monasteries
