= Paser Crossword Stela =

Ancient Egyptian stela

The Paser Crossword Stela is an ancient Egyptian limestone stela that dates from the 20th Dynasty. It was constructed by Paser, c. 1150 BC, during the reign of Pharaoh Ramesses VI.

The stela's text is a hymn to the goddess Mut. It is constructed to be read horizontally, vertically, and around its perimeter, therefore three times. The text employs a complex arrangement of single hieroglyphs and single hieroglyphic blocks, as well as special uses of hieroglyphs, word play, and double entendres, techniques which were popular in ancient Egyptian writings. The crossword-style grid was originally painted blue; the hieroglyphs are incised, in sunken relief.

The stele originally formed a 67-by-80-line vertical rectangle, now much damaged, especially on its base and right side. A roughly 50-by-50-line square area survives in good enough condition to be read easily; other sections have large lacunae, but some other topics can be partially constructed to complete the themes of a hymn to Mut.

The grid is read starting at the upper right, right-to-left in the missing corner of the stela; separator register lines are used for the grid.

== Stela description ==
The stela is constructed from a block of limestone 112 cm (44 in) tall, 84.5 cm (33.3 in) wide, and 11.5 cm (4.5 in) deep. A row of vertical standing gods adorn the region above the hieroglyphs in a horizontal frieze above the first horizontal row; the standing individuals presumably face the goddess Mut; the frieze only forms a short perimeter on the upper part of the stela. The stela is signed by "Paser, True of Voice".

The stela is in the British Museum (catalogue no. EA 194). It was discovered in the vicinity of the Temple of Amun at the Karnak Temple Complex by Giovanni Batista Belzoni.

== Example text, a horizontal and vertical block ==
A sample block:

O29 t a G25 N5 N8 S29 V24 I10 N5
F9 F9 t a D10 t S29 V24 I10 N5 N35 O34
m O34 S29 I10 N5 I10 N5 N35 O34 N17 N17 N14
N5 t f D2 Z1 N5 r a C2 G3

The vertical columns represented are from Columns 38–42, (i.e. blocks one to five), and start the reading of the hymn to Goddess Mut from row one downwards.

Because the stela reads right-to-left, Block 5 corresponds to column 42, Block 1 to column 38.

=== The four horizontal rows, (Hymn 1 of 3) ===
The four rows are translated as follows:

"...great (of) radiancy, who illumines..."
"...strength; (her) eye, it illumines..."
"...as the illuminator of (her?); The Two Lands (and the) Otherworld..."
"...in the presence of the sun-god who sees..."

=== The starting 4 blocks, columns 38-42, (Hymn two of three) ===
The starting 4 blocks of Columns 38-42 are translated as follows: (reading downwards through the blocks)

38–"...great (of) strength in the presence of..."
39–"...radiant; the eye which illumines the face..."
40–"...the sun-god illumines..."
41–"...the sun-god illumines for her..."
42–"...She(Mut) has illumined the Two Lands early..."

=== Hieroglyph transliterated equivalents (approximate) ===
Rows one to four, columns 38-42 and their equivalents:

Col 38	Col 39	Col 40	Col 41	Col 42
'3t	3Kh	Determinative-N8	s-hdj	dj
phtj	jrt	s-hdj	dj	n:s
m-(owl) preposition-G17	shdj	dj	n:s	t3wj-dw3
khft	hr	r'	Determinative-C2	m3

Because the Gardiner's Sign List hieroglyph font only face left, the table above is the reverse-facing direction from the Paser Crossword Stela.

== Cultural references ==
The Stela features prominently in the novel The Third Translation (2005) by Matt Bondurant.
