= Paser (mayor) =

Ancient Egyptian mayor of Thebes

Paser was an ancient Egyptian official under the king Ramesses III in the 20th Dynasty. He was mayor of Thebes. His wife was a woman called Tity.

So far, Paser is only known from the decorated blocks of his funerary chapel. The remains of the funerary chapel were found west of Medinet Habu, that is the modern name of the mortuary temple of Ramesses III. There were built several mud brick chapels once paved on the inside with decorated stone slabs. These chapels belonged to highest officials who had the honor to have a funerary chapel close to that of the king. However, early on the chapels were destroyed and the blocks were used for other building projects. A high number of blocks coming from the chapel of Paser were found as pavement at the Western fortified gate and were reused in tombs around the gate, after it was destroyed. Although the scenes are not complete, there were still found enough blocks to reconstruct at least some walls. Wall I shows scenes from the official life of Paser. Here he also appears with several titles, such as mayor of the city (the city refers to Thebes), the feast leader of Amun or the steward of the city. Another wall shows religious scenes, such as the feast of Sokar and the journey of the neshmet barque.

== Bibliography ==
- Siegfried Schott: Wall Scenes from the Mortuary Chapel of the Mayor Paser at Medinet Habu, Studies in Ancient Oriental Civilization 30, Chicago 1957 online
- K. A. Kitchen: Ramesside Inscriptions: Merenptah & the late Nineteenth Dynasty, Oxford, 1983, pp. 384–389 (copy of all inscriptions from the tomb chapel)
