= Collepardo =

- Comune
- Comune di Collepardo
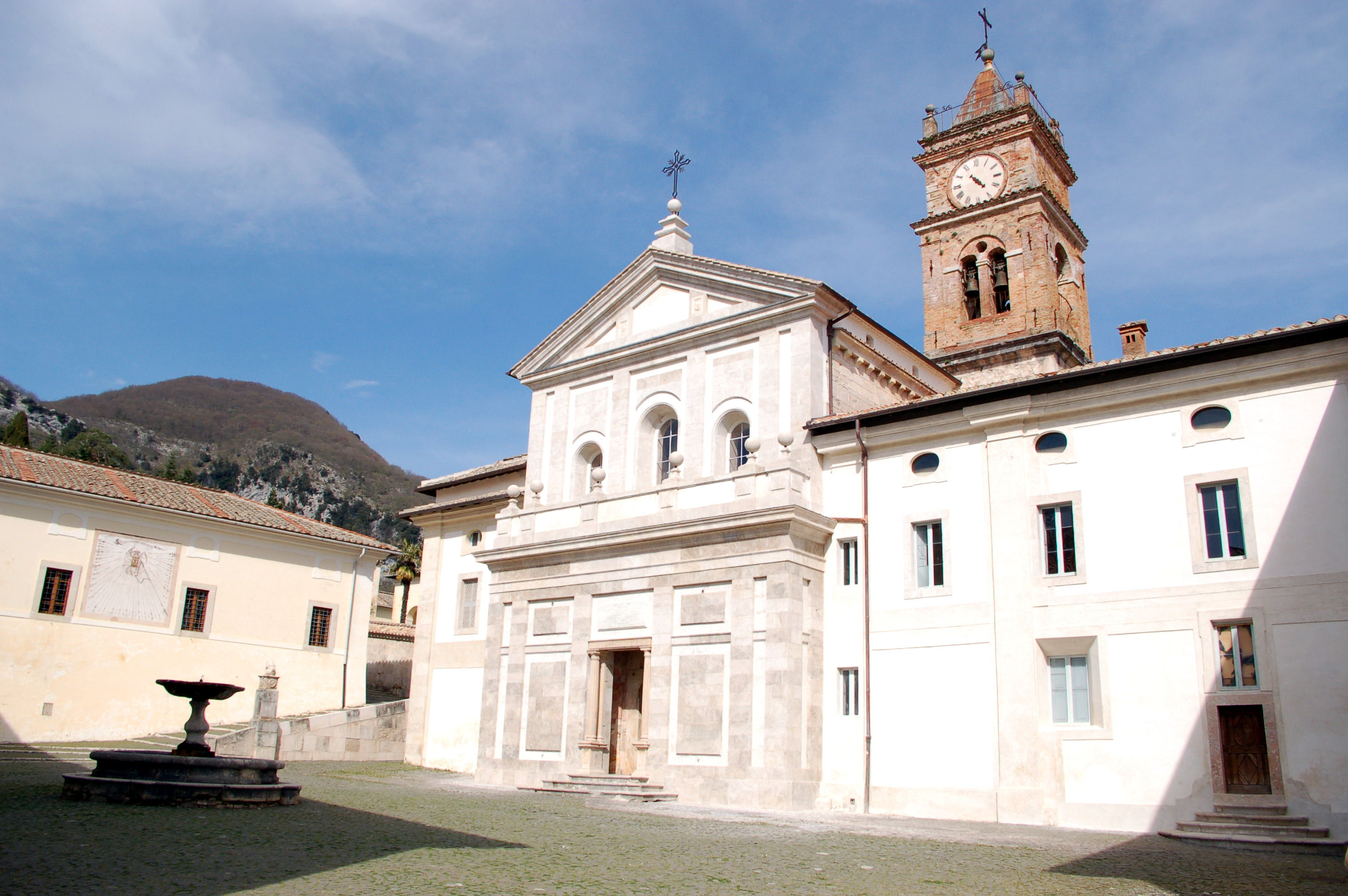
- Church of San Bartolomeo in the Certosa di Trisulti

- Coat of arms

- Location within Italy Location within Lazio
- Coordinates: 41°46′N 13°22′E
- Country: Italy
- Region: Lazio
- Province: Frosinone (FR)
- Frazioni: Civita

Government
  - Mayor: Mauro Bussiglieri

Area
  - Total: 25.0 km^{2} (9.7 sq mi)
- Elevation: 586 m (1,923 ft)

Population (31 December 2010)
  - Total: 975
  - Density: 39.0/km^{2} (101/sq mi)
- Demonym: Collepardesi
- Time zone: UTC+1 (CET)
  - Summer (DST): UTC+2 (CEST)
- Postal code: 03010
- Dialing code: 0775
- Patron saint: Santissimo Salvatore
- Saint day: August 6
- Website: Official website

Collepardo is a comune (municipality) in the Province of Frosinone in the Italian region Lazio, located about 70 kilometres (43 mi) east of Rome and about 15 kilometres (9 mi) north of Frosinone.

== History ==
The presence of ancient polygonal walls ("Pelasgic Walls") testifies the human presence in the area since ancient times, although the current settlement was likely founded in the 6th century CE during the reign of Theodoric the Great. Collepardo belonged to the Colonna family after the reign of pope Martin V (1422).

== Main sights ==
- Collepardo Caves, a group of karst caves
- Pozzo d'Antullo, a sinkhole in the Monti Ernici
- Giardino Botanico di Collepardo
- Certosa di Trisulti, a national monument
