= Pavement Surface Evaluation and Rating =

The PASER system (Pavement Surface Evaluation and Rating) is a 1–10 rating system for road pavement condition developed by the University of Wisconsin-Madison Transportation Information Center. PASER uses visual inspection to evaluate pavement surface conditions. When assessed correctly, PASER ratings provide a basis for comparing the quality of roadway segments. The PASER assessment method does not require measurements of individual distresses, and thus PASER ratings cannot be disaggregated into measurements of specific distress types. The advantage to this method is that roads may be assessed quickly, possibly even by "windshield survey." A primary disadvantage is that because PASER ratings cannot be disaggregated into component distress data, the metric cannot be used in mechanistic-empirical transportation asset management programs.

Numerical PASER ratings are translatable to condition categories and prescribed treatment options, as shown below.

| Quality | Rating | Treatment (asphalt) | Treatment (PCC) |
|---|---|---|---|
| Excellent | 9–10 | No maintenance required | No maintenance required |
| Good | 7–8 | Crack sealing and minor patching | Routine maintenance |
| Fair | 5–6 | Preservation treatments (non-structural) | Surface repairs, partial-depth patching |
| Poor | 3–4 | Structural renewal (overlay) | Extensive slab or joint rehabilitation |
| Failed | 1–2 | Reconstruction | Reconstruction |

The Michigan Transportation Asset Management Council has selected the PASER rating system as the statewide standard of pavement condition reporting.
