= Prince Eugenio, Duke of Genoa =

Prince Eugenio
- Duke of Genoa; Duke of Ancona
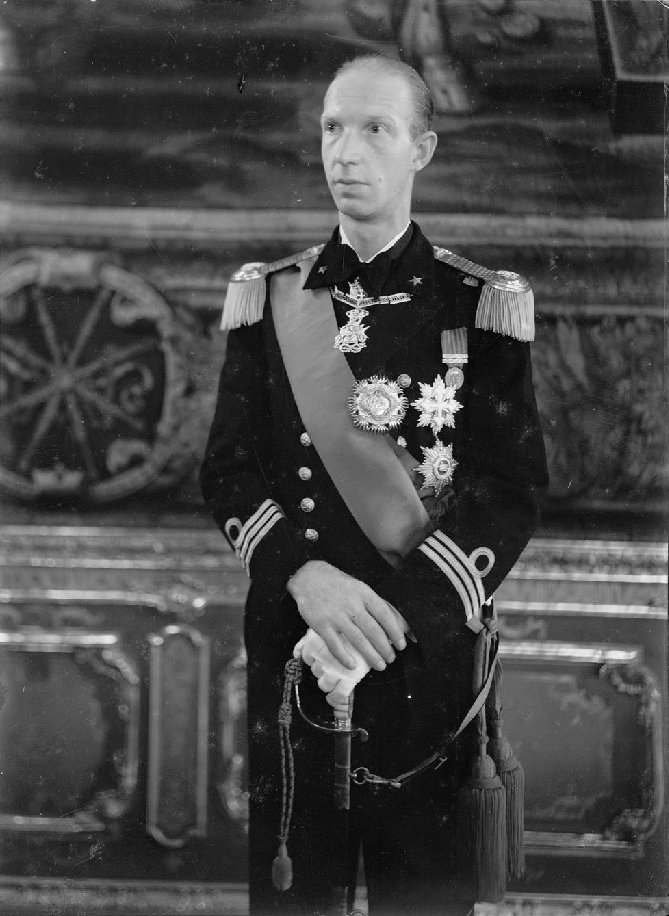
- Eugenio in 1935

Duke of Genoa
- Reign: 7 September 1990 - 8 December 1996
- Predecessor: Prince Filiberto, 4th Duke of Genoa
- Born: 13 March 1906; Turin, Kingdom of Italy
- Died: 8 December 1996 (aged 90); São Paulo, Brazil
- Burial: Basilica of Superga, near Turin
- Spouse: Princess Lucia of the Two Sicilies (m. 1938)
- Issue: Princess Maria Isabella of Savoy-Genoa
Names
- Italian: Eugenio Alfonso Carlo Maria Giuseppe
- House: Savoy
- Father: Prince Tommaso, Duke of Genoa
- Mother: Princess Isabella of Bavaria

Prince Eugenio of Savoy, 5th Duke of Genoa (Eugenio Alfonso Carlo Maria Giuseppe; 13 March 1906 – 8 December 1996) was a member of the House of Savoy, Duke of Ancona from birth, and the 5th and final Duke of Genoa. Prince Eugenio was the sixth and youngest child of Prince Thomas of Savoy, 2nd Duke of Genoa and his wife Princess Isabella of Bavaria.

== Marriage and issue ==
Prince Eugenio married Princess Lucia of the Two Sicilies, fifth child and fourth-eldest daughter of Prince Ferdinand Pius of the Two Sicilies, Duke of Calabria and his wife Princess Maria Ludwiga Theresia of Bavaria, on 29 October 1938 at Nymphenburg Palace in Munich, Germany. The bride and groom were second cousins once removed in descent from King Ludwig I of Bavaria. Prince Eugenio and Princess Lucia had one daughter:

- Princess Maria Isabella Elena Immacolata Barbara Anna Pace of Savoy-Genoa (born 23 June 1943 in Rome), married on 29 April 1971 in Lausanne, Alberto Frioli dei Conti di Rezzano (born 7 April 1943 in Rimini), son of Guido Frioli, Count of Rezzano, and Vittoria Fabbri. They have four children.
  - Don Víctor Eugenio Frioli (born 27 February 1972), married Soraia Barbosa and had issue.
  - Donna María Cristina Frioli (17 August 1973 – 30 September 1973), died in infancy.
  - Don Carlo Alberto Frioli (born 18 July 1974), married Sandra Crepaldi.
  - Donna Maria Luce Lydia Frioli (born 15 August 1978), has an illegitimate daughter.

== Later life ==
After the dissolution of the Kingdom of Italy in 1946, Prince Eugenio and his family relocated to Brazil where the Duke ran a farm. Upon his death on 8 December 1996, the male line of the Genoa branch of the House of Savoy became extinct as did the Royal Dukedom of Genoa. In 2006, the ashes of the Duke and Duchess of Genoa were transferred to the Royal Crypt of Superga near Turin.

== Honours ==
  (Kingdom of Italy)
  - Knight of the Supreme Order of the Most Holy Annunciation
  - Knight of the Order of Saints Maurice and Lazarus
- (Kingdom of the Two Sicilies) Knight Grand Cross of Justice of the Sacred Military Constantinian Order of Saint George
- (Sovereign Military Order of Malta) Knight of Honor and Devotion of the Sovereign Military Hospitaller Order of Saint John of Jerusalem, of Rhodes and of Malta
- (Kingdom of Bavaria) Knight of the Order of Saint Hubert

== Ancestry ==
Ancestors of Prince Eugenio, Duke of Genoa

16. Charles Emmanuel, Prince of Carignano
8. Charles Albert of Sardinia
17. Princess Maria Christina of Saxony
4. Prince Ferdinand, Duke of Genoa
18. Ferdinand III, Grand Duke of Tuscany
9. Archduchess Maria Theresa of Austria
19. Princess Luisa of Naples and Sicily
2. Prince Thomas, Duke of Genoa
20. Maximilian, Hereditary Prince of Saxony
10. John of Saxony
21. Princess Carolina of Parma
5. Princess Elisabeth of Saxony
22. Maximilian I Joseph of Bavaria
11. Princess Amalie Auguste of Bavaria
23. Princess Caroline of Baden
1. Prince Eugenio, Duke of Genoa
24. Maximilian I Joseph of Bavaria (= 22)
12. Ludwig I of Bavaria
25. Princess Augusta Wilhelmine of Hesse-Darmstadt
6. Prince Adalbert of Bavaria
26. Frederick, Duke of Saxe-Altenburg
13. Princess Therese of Saxe-Hildburghausen
27. Duchess Charlotte Georgine of Mecklenburg-Strelitz
3. Princess Isabella of Bavaria
28. Charles IV of Spain
14. Infante Francisco de Paula of Spain
29. Princess Maria Luisa of Parma
7. Infanta Amalia of Spain
30. Francis I of the Two Sicilies
15. Princess Luisa Carlotta of the Two Sicilies
31. Infanta Maria Isabella of Spain

Prince Eugenio, Duke of Genoa House of Savoy Born: 13 March 1906 Died: 8 December 1996
Italian nobility
Preceded by Filiberto	Duke of Genoa; 7 September 1990 – 8 December 1996	Extinct
