= Duchess of Genoa =

19th-century Italian royal title

The Duchess of Genoa was a title bestowed on the wife of the Duke of Genoa. When Princess Elisabeth of Saxony, the Duchess of Genoa, remarried following her husband's death in 1855, her rank and status became a subject of intense diplomatic negotiation between the King of Saxony and the King of Sardinia. She died in 1912 with the title of Dowager Duchess.

== List of duchesses ==
Picture	Name	Father	Birth	Marriage	Became Duchess	Ceased to be Duchess	Death	Husband
	Maria Cristina of Naples and Sicily	Ferdinand I of the Two Sicilies (Bourbon)	17 January 1779	6 April 1807	7 January 1815	12 March 1821 became queen	11 March 1849	Prince Charles Felix
	Elisabeth of Saxony	John of Saxony (Wettin)	4 February 1830	22 April 1850		14 August 1912 (Husband died in 1855; title at death was Dowager Duchess)		Prince Ferdinand
	Isabella of Bavaria	Prince Adalbert of Bavaria (Wittelsbach)	31 August 1863	14 April 1883		26 February 1924		Prince Thomas
	Maria Luigia Alliaga Gandolfi	Carlo, conte di Ricaldone, conte di Borghetto, Montegrosso e Pornas	22 October 1899	28 February 1938		24 June 1963 husband's death	19 July 1986	Prince Ferdinando
	Lydia of Arenberg	Engelbert-Maria, 9th Duke of Arenberg (Arenberg)	1 April 1905	30 April 1928	24 June 1963 husband's accession	23 July 1977		Prince Filiberto
	Lucia of Bourbon-Two Sicilies	Prince Ferdinand Pius, Duke of Calabria (Bourbon-Two Sicilies)	9 July 1908	30 April 1928	7 September 1990 husband's accession	8 December 1996 husband's death	3 November 2001	Prince Eugenio
TITLE EXTINCT

== See also ==
- List of Savoyard consorts
