= Prince Adalberto, Duke of Bergamo =

Prince Adalberto
- Duke of Bergamo
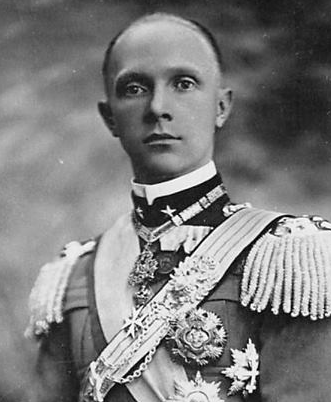
- Adalberto in 1929
- Born: 19 March 1898; Turin, Piedmont, Kingdom of Italy
- Died: 15 December 1982 (aged 84); Turin, Piedmont, Italy
- Burial: Basilica of Superga
Names
- Adalberto Luitpoldo Elena Giuseppe Maria di Savoia
- House: House of Savoy
- Father: Thomas, 2nd Duke of Genoa
- Mother: Princess Isabella of Bavaria

Prince Adalberto of Savoy, Duke of Bergamo (19 March 1898 – 15 December 1982), was an Italian prince of the House of Savoy.

== Early life ==
Born in Turin, Prince Adalberto was the fourth son of Prince Tommaso, Duke of Genoa (1854–1931), and his wife, Princess Isabella of Bavaria (1863–1924). On 22 September 1904, he was given the title Duke of Bergamo.

== Military career ==
Prince Adalberto pursued a career in the Royal Italian Army, achieving the rank of General. He fought in the First World War at Montello in October 1917 and in Vallagarina in February 1918. In 1936, he commanded the Italian 24th Infantry Division Gran Sasso during the Second Italo-Ethiopian War and later the 58th Infantry Division Legnano.

When Italy joined World War II, he became commander of the Italian 8th Army (1940–1942), and later in 1943 of the 7th Army. Benito Mussolini exploited Prince Adalberto's secret homosexuality to ensure his loyalty, as well as the loyalty of other LGBT members of the House of Savoy, to the Fascist Party.

== Later life ==
After the war, he lived quietly and mostly anonymously and settled in a villa on the property of his friend, Gertrud Kiefer von Raffler (the widow of Massimo Olivetti, son of Camillo Olivetti), where he died in 1982.

== Ancestry ==
Ancestors of Prince Adalberto, Duke of Bergamo

8. Charles Albert of Sardinia
4. Prince Ferdinando, Duke of Genoa
9. Archduchess Maria Theresa of Austria
2. Prince Tommaso, Duke of Genoa
10. John of Saxony
5. Princess Elisabeth of Saxony
11. Princess Amalie Auguste of Bavaria
1. Prince Adalberto, Duke of Bergamo
12. Ludwig I of Bavaria
6. Prince Adalbert of Bavaria
13. Princess Therese of Saxe-Hildburghausen
3. Princess Isabella of Bavaria
14. Infante Francisco de Paula of Spain
7. Infanta Amalia of Spain
15. Princess Luisa Carlotta of the Two Sicilies
