= Prince Filiberto, Duke of Genoa =

Prince Filiberto
- Duke of Genoa; Duke of Pistoia
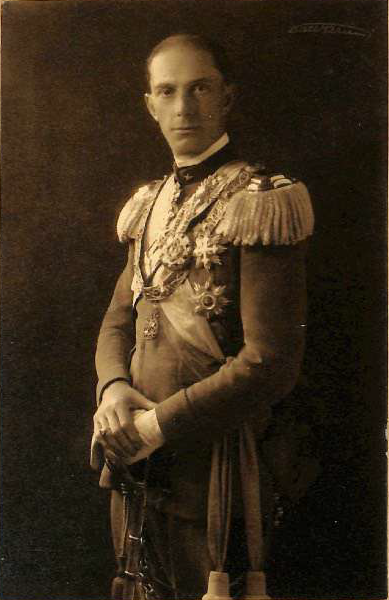
- Filiberto in 1928

Duke of Genoa
- Reign: 24 June 1963 - 7 September 1990
- Predecessor: Prince Ferdinando 3rd Duke of Genoa
- Successor: Prince Eugenio, 5th Duke of Genoa
- Born: 10 March 1895; Turin, Kingdom of Italy
- Died: 7 September 1990 (aged 95); Lausanne, Switzerland
- Spouse: Princess Lydia of Arenberg (m. 1928; died 1977)
Names
- Filiberto Lodovico Massimiliano Emanuele Maria di Savoia-Genova
- House: Savoy
- Father: Prince Tommaso, Duke of Genoa
- Mother: Princess Isabella of Bavaria

Prince Filiberto of Savoy, 4th Duke of Genoa (Filiberto Lodovico Massimiliano Emanuele Maria; 10 March 1895 – 7 September 1990) was the fourth Duke of Genoa and a member of the House of Savoy.

Born in Turin, Prince Filiberto was the second son of Prince Tommaso, Duke of Genoa and his wife Princess Isabella of Bavaria (1863–1924). On 22 September 1904 he was given the title Duke of Pistoia.

Prince Filiberto pursued a career in the Royal Italian Army achieving the rank of General. A supporter of Benito Mussolini, he volunteered to serve in the Second Italo-Abyssinian War where he commanded the 1st CC.NN. Division "23 Marzo". It was his division that raised the Italian flag over Amba Aradam. When Italy joined World War II, he became commander of the Italian 7th Army, but held no major commands after Italy joined the Allies.

Prince Filiberto married Princess Lydia of Arenberg on 30 April 1928 in Turin. They had no children.

After the Second World War a referendum was held in Italy where a majority of people voted to abolish the monarchy. With the death of his brother Ferdinando on 24 June 1963 he succeeded to the title Duke of Genoa.

Prince Filiberto died in Lausanne, Switzerland. His youngest brother Eugenio succeeded to the title Duke of Genoa.

== Wife ==
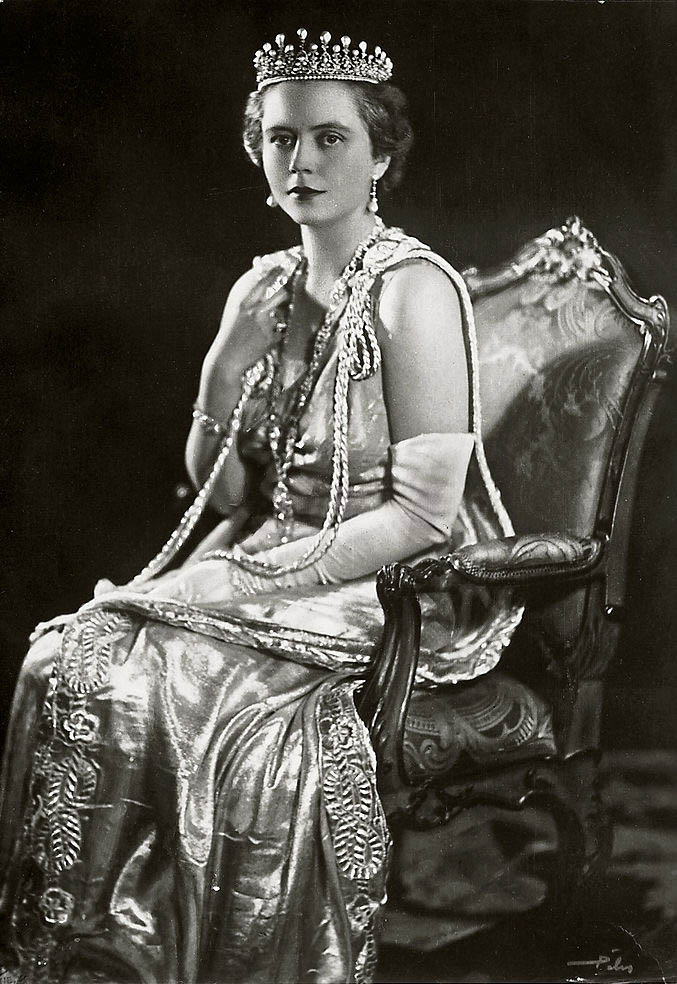
Lydia of Arenberg

Prince Filiberto's wife was Princess Lydia of Arenberg (Lydia Eleonora Charlotte d'Arenberg; 1 April 1905 - 23 July 1977). She was born in Brussels in 1905 as the daughter of Engelbert-Maria, 9th Duke of Arenberg and his wife Princess Hedwige of Ligne. She was a member and princess of the House of Arenberg.

== Ancestry ==
Ancestors of Prince Filiberto, Duke of Genoa

8. Charles Albert of Sardinia
4. Prince Ferdinando, Duke of Genoa
9. Archduchess Maria Theresa of Austria
2. Prince Tommaso, Duke of Genoa
10. John of Saxony
5. Princess Elisabeth of Saxony
11. Princess Amalie Auguste of Bavaria
1. Prince Filiberto, Duke of Genoa
12. Ludwig I of Bavaria
6. Prince Adalbert of Bavaria
13. Princess Therese of Saxe-Hildburghausen
3. Princess Isabella of Bavaria
14. Infante Francisco de Paula of Spain
7. Infanta Amalia of Spain
15. Princess Luisa Carlotta of the Two Sicilies

Prince Filiberto, Duke of Genoa House of Savoy Born: 10 March 1895 Died: 7 September 1990
Italian nobility
Preceded by Ferdinando	Duke of Genoa; 24 June 1963 – 7 September 1990	Succeeded by Eugenio
