= Prince Ferdinando, Duke of Genoa (1884–1963) =

Prince Ferdinando of Savoy
- Duke of Genoa; Prince of Udine
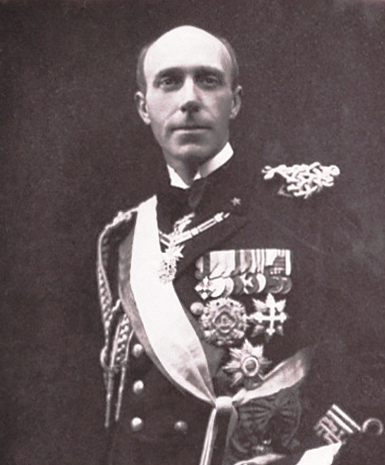
- Ferdinando c. 1920

Duke of Genoa
- Reign: 15 April 1931 - 24 June 1963
- Predecessor: Prince Tommaso, 2nd Duke of Genoa
- Successor: Prince Filiberto, 4th Duke of Genoa
- Born: 21 April 1884; Turin
- Died: 24 June 1963 (aged 79); Bordighera
- Spouse: Maria Luisa Alliaga Gandolfi (m. 1938)
Names
- Ferdinando Umberto Filippo Adalberto di Savoia
- House: House of Savoy (Genoa branch)
- Father: Thomas, 2nd Duke of Genoa
- Mother: Princess Isabella of Bavaria

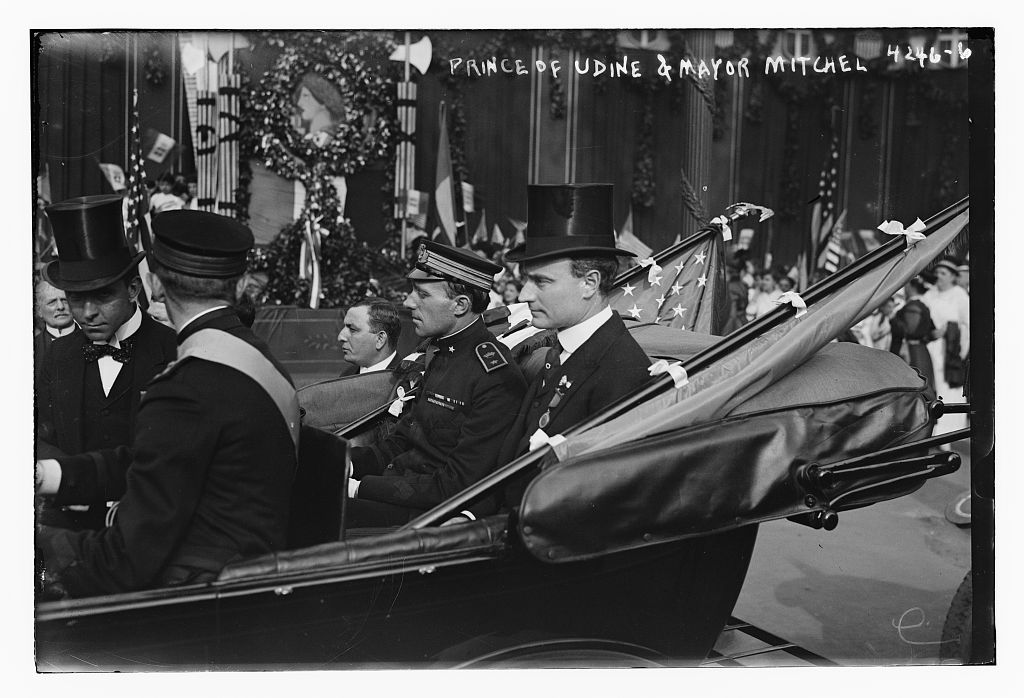
Prince Ferdinando in 1917 with the mayor of New York, John Purroy Mitchel.

Reception of Prince Ferdinando passing Washington Arch in New York, 1917

Prince Ferdinando of Savoy, 3rd Duke of Genoa (Ferdinando Umberto Filippo Adalberto; 21 April 1884 – 24 June 1963) was the third Duke of Genoa and a member of the House of Savoy. He was an admiral in the Royal Italian Navy.

== Early life ==
Prince Ferdinando was born in Turin the eldest son of Prince Thomas of Savoy, Duke of Genoa (1854-1931) and his wife Princess Isabella of Bavaria (1863–1924). On 22 September 1904 he was given the title Prince of Udine.

Ferdinando pursued a career in the Italian Regia Marina (Royal Navy). Holding the rank of capitano di navio (captain), he served in World War I, commanding the scout cruiser Sparviero in 1917 and 1918, and was decorated with a medal of honour for personal bravery.

In May 1917, with war raging in Europe, Prince Ferdinando was appointed to lead an Italian War Commission to the United States of America. The commission, which included Guglielmo Marconi and leading Italian political and commercial figures, visited the United States with the task of discussing financial and trade agreements and increasing co-operation between the two countries to help the Italian war effort.

== Post-war ==
In the autumn of 1927 Mussolini despatched the Prince of Udine to Tangier, Morocco in command of a naval squadron of three warships to demonstrate Italy’s interest in the city. In November 1930 he represented his cousin King Victor Emmanuel III at the coronation of Emperor Haile Selassie I of Ethiopia. Prince Ferdinando succeeded to the title Duke of Genoa on 15 April 1931 following the death of his father.

Later on in his naval career Prince Ferdinando achieved the rank of admiral and become commander of the upper Adriatic Sea.

He married in Turin on 28 February 1938, Maria Luisa Alliaga Gandolfi dei conti di Ricaldone (11 October 1899 in Fossano – 19 July 1986 in Turin), an Italian noblewoman. Maria Luisa was a daughter of Carlo Gandolfi di Ricaldone, Count of Borghetto, Montegrosso and Pornassio, and Emma Teresa Luisa Cavalli. They had no children.

The reign of the House of Savoy in Italy came to end on 12 June 1946 after a referendum was held and the Italian people voted to abolish the monarchy.

With his death in Bordighera without children, his brother Prince Filiberto succeeded to the title Duke of Genoa.

== Ancestry ==
Ancestors of Prince Ferdinando, Duke of Genoa (1884–1963)

8. Charles Albert, King of Sardinia
4. Prince Ferdinand of Savoy, Duke of Genoa
9. Maria Theresa of Tuscany
2. Prince Thomas of Savoy, Duke of Genoa
10. John, King of Saxony
5. Princess Elisabeth of Saxony
11. Amalie Auguste of Bavaria
1. Prince Ferdinando of Savoy, Duke of Genoa
12. Ludwig I of Bavaria
6. Prince Adalbert of Bavaria
13. Therese of Saxe-Hildburghausen
3. Princess Isabella of Bavaria
14. Infante Francisco de Paula of Spain
7. Infanta Amalia of Spain
15. Princess Luisa Carlotta of the Two Sicilies

Prince Ferdinando, Duke of Genoa (1884–1963) House of Savoy Born: 21 April 1884 Died: 24 June 1963
Italian nobility
Preceded by Thomas	Duke of Genoa; 15 April 1931 – 24 June 1963	Succeeded by Filiberto
