= Prince Ferdinando, Duke of Genoa =

Prince Ferdinando, Duke of Genoa may refer to:

- Prince Ferdinando, Duke of Genoa (1822–1855)
- Prince Ferdinando, Duke of Genoa (1884–1963)
