= Princess Isabella of Bavaria =

Isabella of Bavaria
- Duchess of Genoa
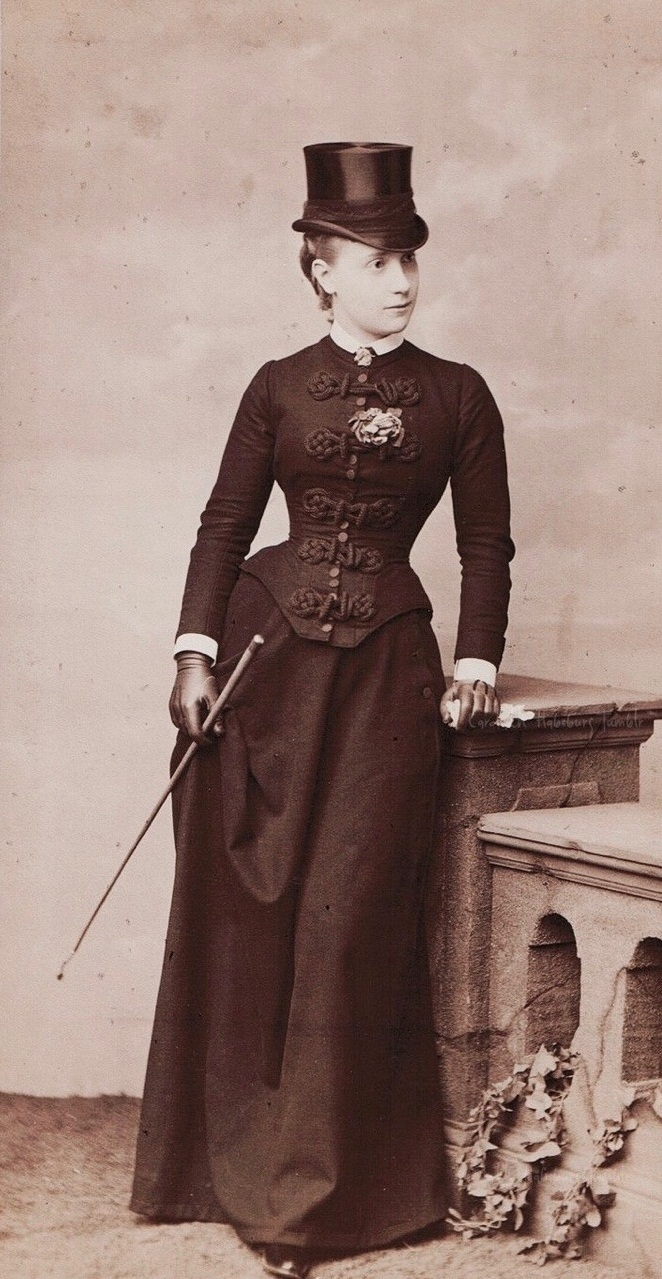
- Princess Isabella in the 1880s
- Born: 31 August 1863; Nymphenburg Palace, Munich, Bavaria
- Died: 26 February 1924 (aged 60); Rome, Italy
- Spouse: Prince Tommaso, Duke of Genoa (m. 1883)
- Issue: Prince Ferdinando, Duke of Genoa; Prince Filiberto, Duke of Genoa; Bona Margherita, Princess Konrad of Bavaria; Prince Adalberto, Duke of Bergamo; Adelaide, Princess of Arsoli; Prince Eugenio, Duke of Genoa
Names
- German: Marie Elisabeth Luise Amalie Elvire Blanche Eleonore; Italian: Maria Isabella Luisa Amalia Elvira Bianca Eleonora
- House: Wittelsbach
- Father: Prince Adalbert of Bavaria
- Mother: Infanta Amalia of Spain

Princess Isabella of Bavaria (Marie Elisabeth Luise Amalie Elvire Blanche Eleonore; 31 August 1863 – 26 February 1924) was the third child and eldest daughter of Prince Adalbert of Bavaria and his wife Infanta Amalia of Spain. By her marriage to Prince Tommaso, Duke of Genoa, she became referred to as the Duchess of Genoa.

== Family ==
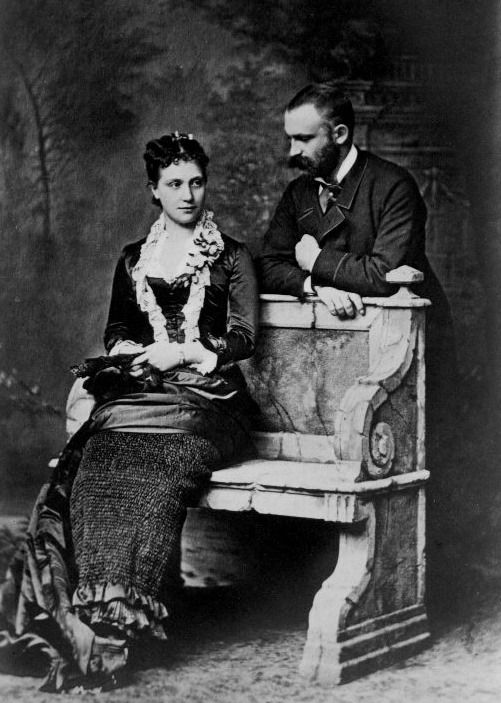
Isabella and Thomas, Duchess and Duke of Genoa, 1882

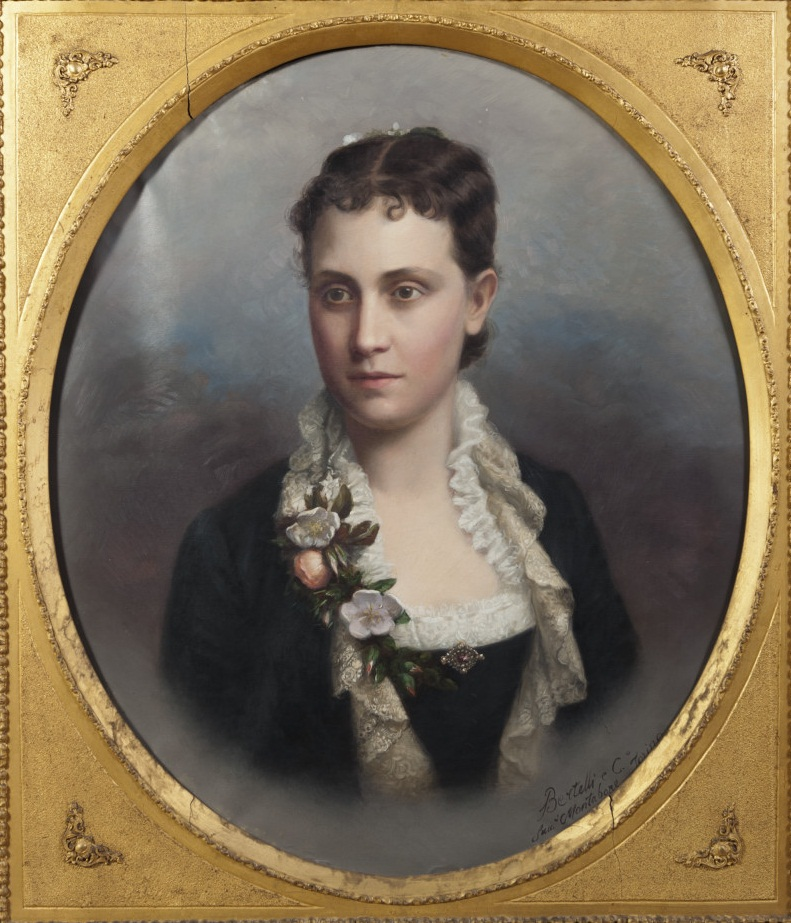
Portrait, c. 1882

Isabella was one of five children born to Prince Adalbert of Bavaria and his wife Infanta Amalia of Spain.

Isabella's father Adalbert was the fourth son of Ludwig I of Bavaria and Therese of Saxe-Hildburghausen. Her mother Amalia was a daughter of Infante Francisco de Paula of Spain, a younger brother of King Ferdinand VII of Spain. Her mother was also a sister of Francis, Duke of Cádiz, the consort of Ferdinand VII's daughter Queen Isabella II.

== Marriage and children ==
On 14 April 1883, at Nymphenburg, Bavaria, Isabella married Prince Tommaso, Duke of Genoa. He was the only son of Prince Ferdinando, Duke of Genoa and his wife Princess Elisabeth of Saxony. He was also a brother-in-law through his sister Margherita of Savoy of Umberto I of Italy, and thus was an uncle of the future King Victor Emmanuel III of Italy. Their union was the fourth time the houses of Wittelsbach and Savoy had been united in marriage.

The wedding was regarded by one spectator as "remarkable for good taste and simplicity". Ludwig II of Bavaria (Isabella's cousin) did not attend, as he rarely went to public events. His absence, observed one attendee, meant that the wedding guests "could enjoy themselves in an atmosphere of conviviality which is rarely found in Court festivities".

Isabella and Tommaso had the following children:

Name	Birth	Death	Notes
Ferdinando, 3rd Duke of Genoa and Prince of Udine	21 April 1884	24 June 1963	Married Maria Luisa Alliaga Gandolfi; no issue
Filiberto, 4th Duke of Genoa and Duke of Pistoia	10 March 1895	7 September 1990	Married Princess Lydia von Arenberg; no issue
Princess Maria Bona of Savoy-Genoa	1 August 1896	2 February 1971	Married Prince Konrad of Bavaria; had issue
Adalberto, Duke of Bergamo	19 March 1898	15 December 1982	General during WWII, no issue
Princess Maria Adelaide of Savoy-Genoa	25 April 1904	8 February 1979	Married Leone Massimo, Prince of Arsoli (great-grandson of Princess Marie Caroline of Naples and Sicily); had issue
Eugenio, 5th Duke of Genoa and Duke of Ancona	13 March 1906	8 December 1996	Married Princess Lucia of Bourbon-Two Sicilies; had issue

== Later life ==
In 1905, Isabella and her husband, as well as other members of the House of Savoy attended a ceremony in honor of the beatification of a French priest. It was attended by Pope Pius X, along with 1,000 French pilgrims and several thousand worshipers of other nationalities, as well as twenty-two Cardinals and the Papal Court. The event was notable as it was the first time members of the House of Savoy had assisted at a religious function in the presence of the Pope.

As Duke and Duchess of Genoa, Isabella and her husband often attended other royal functions as representatives of the House of Savoy. For instance, in 1911 they attended the unveiling of a large monument of Victor Emmanuel II of Italy in Rome. The event had nearly one million witnesses, and was also attended by dowager queens Maria Pia of Portugal and Margherita of Italy and the Duke and Duchess of Aosta.

In 1913, Isabella had a near escape from death. While anointing her arms and neck with a preparation for rheumatism, she became too close to a lamp, causing the preparation to ignite. She only survived because her maid quickly smothered the flames.

== Death ==
On 26 February 1924, Isabella died of bronchial pneumonia in Rome. She had been ill for several days beforehand. Tommaso would die seven years later, in 1931.

== Ancestry ==
Ancestors of Princess Isabella of Bavaria

8. Maximilian I Joseph of Bavaria
4. Ludwig I of Bavaria
9. Princess Augusta Wilhelmine of Hesse-Darmstadt
2. Prince Adalbert of Bavaria
10. Frederick, Duke of Saxe-Altenburg
5. Princess Therese of Saxe-Hildburghausen
11. Duchess Charlotte Georgine of Mecklenburg-Strelitz
1. Princess Isabella of Bavaria
12. Charles IV of Spain
6. Infante Francisco de Paula of Spain
13. Princess Maria Luisa of Parma
3. Infanta Amalia of Spain
14. Francis I of the Two Sicilies
7. Princess Luisa Carlotta of the Two Sicilies
15. Infanta Maria Isabella of Spain

Princess Isabella of Bavaria House of Wittelsbach Born: 31 August 1863 Died: 26 February 1924
Italian royalty
Preceded by Elisabeth of Saxony	Duchess consort of Genoa; 1883-1924	Succeeded by Maria Luisa Alliaga Gandolfi dei conti di Ricaldone
