= Prince Tommaso, Duke of Genoa =

Duke of Genoa (1854–1931)

Prince Thomas
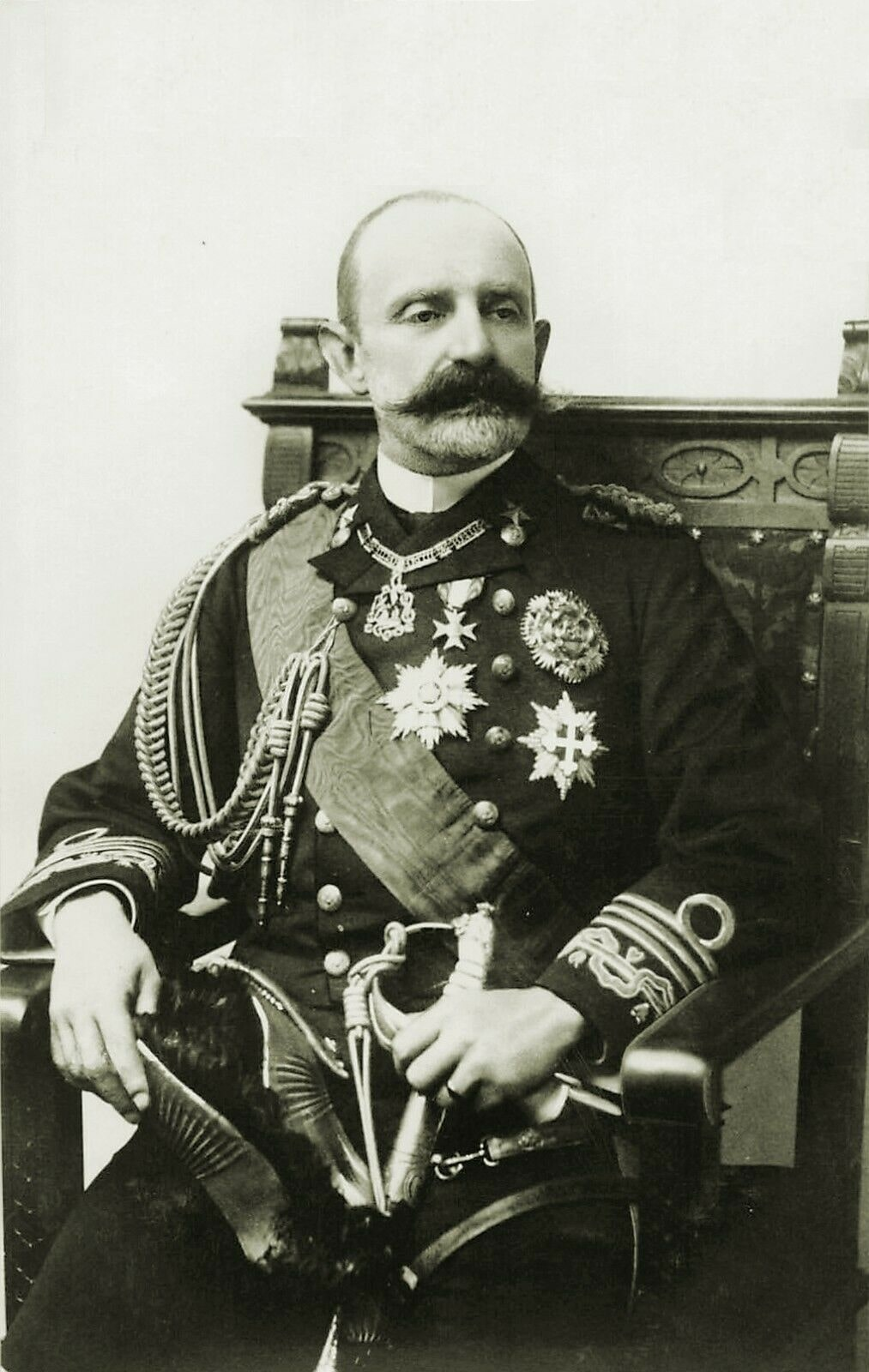

Duke of Genoa
- Reign: 10 February 1855 - 15 April 1931
- Predecessor: Prince Ferdinand, 1st Duke
- Successor: Prince Ferdinand, 3rd Duke
- Born: 6 February 1854; Palazzo Chiablese, Turin, Kingdom of Sardinia
- Died: 15 April 1931 (aged 77); Turin, Kingdom of Italy
- Spouse: Princess Isabella of Bavaria (m. 1883; died 1924)
- Issue: Prince Ferdinando, 3rd Duke of Genoa; Prince Filiberto, 4th Duke of Genoa; Princess Bona Margherita; Prince Adalberto, Duke of Bergamo; Princess Adelaide; Prince Eugenio, 5th Duke of Genoa
Names
- Tommaso Alberto Vittorio di Savoia
- House: House of Savoy-Genoa
- Father: Prince Ferdinand, 1st Duke of Genoa
- Mother: Princess Elisabeth of Saxony
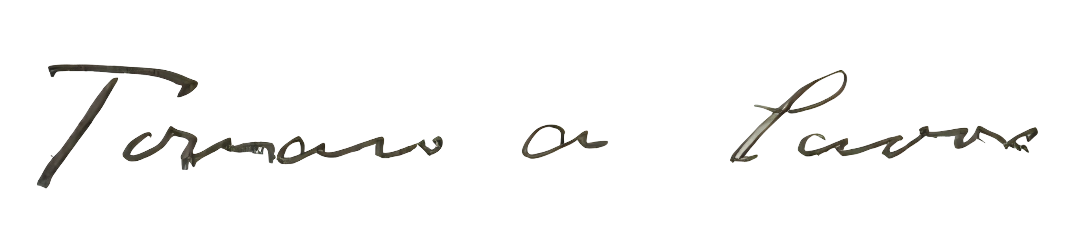
- Signature

Prince Tommaso of Savoy, 2nd Duke of Genoa (Tommaso Alberto Vittorio; 6 February 1854 – 15 April 1931), who is also known as Thomas Albert Victor of Savoy, was an Italian royal prince, nephew of Victor Emmanuel at the time the King of Sardinia, who on 18 February 1861 became the first King of a united Italy. His cousin and brother-in-law Umberto I and his nephew Victor Emmanuel III became subsequent kings of Italy.

== Biography ==
Prince Thomas was born in Turin in 1854, as the second child and only son of Prince Ferdinand of Savoy, 1st Duke of Genoa, the second son of Charles Albert, King of Sardinia (1798–1849, abdicated 1848) and his wife Maria Theresa of Austria-Tuscany (1801–55). Prince Thomas' mother was Princess Elisabeth of Saxony (1830–1912), daughter of John, King of Saxony (1801–73) and Princess Amalie Auguste of Bavaria (1801–77). Barely a year after his birth, on 10 February 1855, his father died and Prince Thomas inherited his title, becoming the 2nd Duke of Genoa. He was educated at Harrow.

With the accession of Victor Emmanuel II to the throne of Italy in 1861, Prince Tommaso, in common with all of the family members, became a prince of Italy.

Prince Thomas' elder sister Princess Margherita of Savoy-Genoa (1851–1926) married King Umberto I of Italy. Her only child was King Victor Emmanuel III of Italy, who reigned starting from his father's murder in 1900.

During World War I, Victor Emanuel III assumed the duties of Supreme Commander of the Armed Forces and named the Duke of Genoa as Luogotenente, in which position he managed the civil affairs of the kingdom throughout the war.

Prince Thomas died in 1931, leaving six adult children. He was the last surviving grandchild of Charles Albert of Sardinia.

== Family and children ==
In 1883 at Nymphenburg, Bavaria, he was married to Princess Maria Isabella of Bavaria (1863–1924), the eldest daughter of the late Prince Adalbert of Bavaria (1828–1875) and Infanta Amalia of Spain (1834–1905), daughter of the Duke of Cadiz.

Their marriage produced the following children:

Name	Birth	Death	Notes
Prince Ferdinando, 3rd Duke of Genoa and Prince of Udine	21 April 1884	24 June 1963	married Maria Luisa Alliaga Gandolfi dei conti (of the Counts) di Ricaldone; no issue.
Prince Filiberto, 4th Duke of Genoa and Duke of Pistoia	10 March 1895	7 September 1990	married Princess Lydia von Arenberg; no issue.
Princess Maria Bona Margherita Albertina	1 August 1896	2 February 1971	married Prince Konrad of Bavaria; had issue.
Prince Adalberto, Duke of Bergamo	19 March 1898	15 December 1982	Italian general in WWII, no issue.
Princess Maria Adelaide Vittoria Amelia	25 April 1904	8 February 1979	married Leone Massimo, Prince of Arsoli (great-grandson of Princess Caroline of Naples and Sicily); had issue.
Prince Eugenio, 5th Duke of Genoa and Duke of Ancona	13 March 1906	8 December 1996	married Princess Lucia of Bourbon-Two Sicilies; had issue.

== Honours ==
- Kingdom of Saxony: Knight of the Order of the Rue Crown, 1871
- Kingdom of Italy:
  - Knight of the Supreme Order of the Most Holy Annunciation, 2 June 1872
  - Grand Cross of the Order of Saints Maurice and Lazarus, 2 June 1872
  - Grand Cross of the Order of the Crown of Italy, 2 June 1872
- Kingdom of Hawaii: Knight's Grand Cross of the Royal order of Kamehameha I, 1874
- Austria-Hungary: Grand Cross of the Royal Hungarian Order of St. Stephen, 1875
- Kingdom of Prussia:
  - Knight of the Order of the Black Eagle, 22 October 1875
  - Grand Commander's Cross of the Royal House Order of Hohenzollern, 17 May 1893
- Empire of Japan: Grand Cordon of the Supreme Order of the Chrysanthemum, 8 December 1879
- Kingdom of Bavaria: Knight of the Order of St. Hubert, 1883
- Spain:
  - Grand Cross of the Royal and Distinguished Order of Charles III, 5 September 1887; with Collar, 15 May 1902
  - Knight of the Order of the Golden Fleece, 6 February 1888
- Siam: Knight of the Most Illustrious Order of the Royal House of Chakri, 14 May 1897
- United Kingdom: Honorary Knight Grand Cross of the Royal Victorian Order, 30 April 1903

== Ancestry ==
Ancestors of Prince Tommaso, Duke of Genoa

8. Charles Emmanuel, Prince of Carignano
4. Charles Albert of Sardinia
9. Princess Maria Christina of Saxony
2. Prince Ferdinando, Duke of Genoa
10. Ferdinand III, Grand Duke of Tuscany
5. Archduchess Maria Theresa of Austria
11. Princess Luisa of Naples and Sicily
1. Prince Tommaso, Duke of Genoa
12. Maximilian, Hereditary Prince of Saxony
6. John of Saxony
13. Princess Carolina of Parma
3. Princess Elisabeth of Saxony
14. Maximilian I Joseph of Bavaria
7. Princess Amalie Auguste of Bavaria
15. Princess Caroline of Baden

== Notes and references ==
Preceded by Ferdinando, 1st Duke	Duke of Genoa; 1855–1931	Succeeded by Ferdinando, 3rd Duke
