= Duke of Genoa =

Italian noble title

Coat of arms

Duke of Genoa was a subsidiary title of the King of Sardinia. It was first awarded in 1815 to Prince Charles Felix of Savoy, who became the King of Sardinia in 1821.

Upon the death of King Charles Felix in 1831, the title was given to Prince Ferdinando, the second son of King Charles Albert of Sardinia. The title became extinct in 1996 on the death of Prince Eugenio, a great-grandson of King Charles Albert.

== List of dukes of Genoa ==
Name	Portrait	Birth	Marriages	Death
Prince Charles Felix; 1815–1821		6 April 1765; Turin fifth son of Victor Amadeus III of Sardinia and Maria Antonietta of Spain	Maria Cristina of Naples and Sicily; 7 Mar 1807; Palermo without issue	27 April 1831; Turin aged 66
Ferdinando I 1831–1855		15 November 1822; Florence second son of Charles Albert of Sardinia and Maria Theresa of Austria	Princess Elisabeth of Saxony; 22 Apr 1850; Dresden two children	10 February 1855; Turin aged 32
Prince Tommaso; 1855–1931		6 February 1854; Palazzo Chiablese, Turin only son of Ferdinando and Princess Elisabeth of Saxony	Princess Isabella of Bavaria; 14 April 1883; Nymphenburg Palace six children	15 April 1931; Turin aged 77
Prince Ferdinando; 1931–1963		21 Apr 1884; Turin eldest son of Prince Tommaso and Princess Isabella of Bavaria	Maria Luigia Alliaga Gandolfi; 28 February 1938; Torino without issue	24 June 1963; Bordighera aged 79
Prince Filiberto; 1963–1990		10 March 1895; Turin second son of Prince Tommaso and Princess Isabella of Bavaria	Princess Lydia of Arenberg; 30 April 1928; Turin without issue	7 September 1990; Lausanne aged 95
Prince Eugenio; 1990–1996		13 March 1906; Turin fourth son of Prince Tommaso and Princess Isabella of Bavaria	Princess Lucia of Bourbon-Two Sicilies; 30 April 1928; Nymphenburg Palace one daughter	8 Dec 1996; São Paulo aged 90

== See also ==
- Duchess of Genoa
