= Princess Alexandra of Bavaria =

German princess and writer

Alexandra
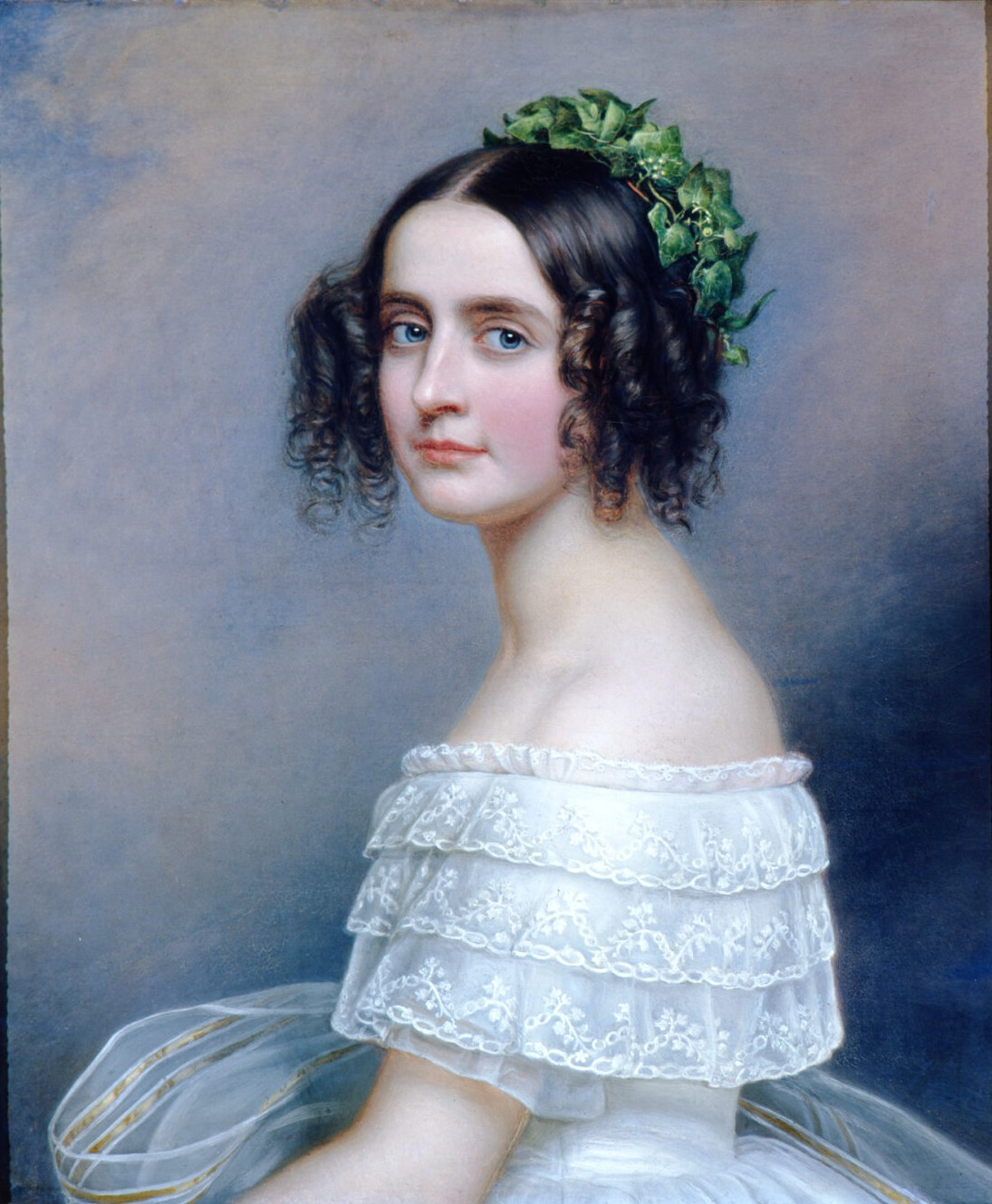
- 1845 portrait
- Born: 26 August 1826; Schloss Johannisburg, Aschaffenburg
- Died: 21 September 1875 (aged 49); Schloss Nymphenburg
- Burial: Theatinerkirche, Munich
Names
- German: Alexandra Amalie
- House: Wittelsbach
- Father: Ludwig I of Bavaria
- Mother: Therese of Saxe-Hildburghausen

Princess Alexandra Amalie of Bavaria (26 August 1826 – 21 September 1875) was a German princess and writer. In the present day, she is best known for her psychological issues, most notably her belief that she had swallowed a glass piano as a child.

== Life ==
Alexandra was born in Schloss Johannisburg in Aschaffenburg, Bavaria, the eighth child and fifth daughter of King Ludwig I of Bavaria and of his wife, Princess Therese of Saxe-Hildburghausen. As a girl, her portrait was painted by Joseph Karl Stieler for the Gallery of Beauties, which her father commissioned at Schloss Nymphenburg.

In the 1850s, Prince Louis Lucien Bonaparte asked King Ludwig for Alexandra's hand in marriage, but as he had been previously married and divorced, Ludwig refused, using as an excuse Alexandra's delicate health. Alexandra never married, and instead was appointed abbess of the Royal Chapter for Ladies of Saint Anne in Munich and Würzburg; this was a religious community specifically for ladies of nobility.

=== Writer ===
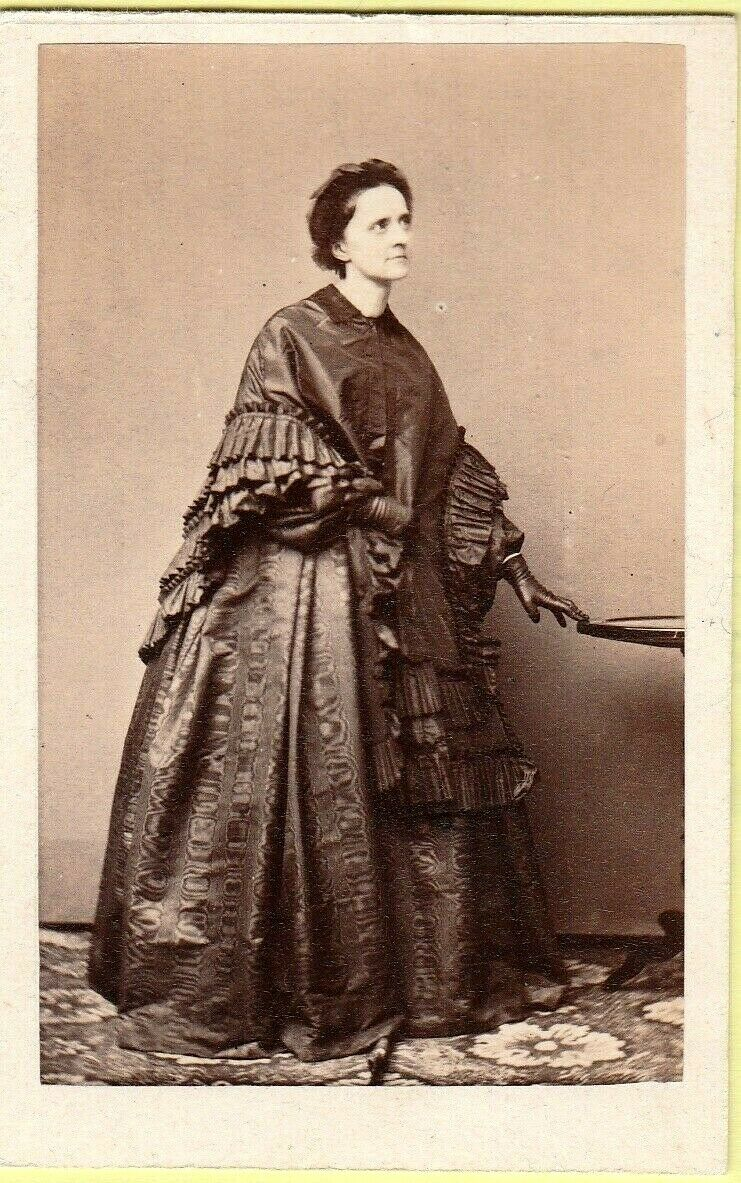
Photograph of Alexandra, 1872

In 1852, Alexandra began a literary career. Her first book of stories was entitled Weihnachtsrosen (Christmas roses). The next year she published Souvenirs, pensées et essais (Memories, thoughts and essays). In 1856 appeared Feldblumen (Field flowers), the proceeds of which she donated to the Maximilian Orphanage. In 1858, appeared Phantasie- und Lebensbilder (Daydreams and biographical sketches), a collection of loose translations into German from English and French. In 1862, she produced a loose translation into German of some of the romances of Eugenie Foa. The following year appeared Thautropfen (Dewdrops), a collection of short stories translated into German from French as well as others of her own.

In 1870, Alexandra produced Das Kindertheater (The children's theatre), a German translation of some French children's plays from Arnaud Berquin's L'ami des enfants. That same year appeared Der erste des Monats (The first of the month), a German translation of Jean-Nicolas Bouilly's French book. In 1873, she produced Maiglöckchen (Lilies of the valley), a collection of short stories. Alexandra also had a number of contributions published in Isabella Braun's periodical Jugendblätter.

Alexandra died on 21 September 1875 (the same day as her brother Prince Adalbert), at the age of 49, at Schloss Nymphenburg. She is buried in the Wittelsbach crypt in the Theatinerkirche in Munich.

== Psychological issues ==
Notwithstanding her literary accomplishments, Alexandra suffered from a number of psychological eccentricities, including a fixation with cleanliness as well as wearing only white clothes.

In her early twenties, she notably developed a delusion that, as a child, she had swallowed a grand piano made of glass, which remained inside her. This delusion was the subject of a 2010 BBC Radio 3 programme called "The Glass Piano", written and narrated by poet Deborah Levy, with musical sound effects interspersed between commentary by psychoanalyst Susie Orbach and others. She was the subject of a play at the Coronet Cinema in 2019.

== See also ==
- King Ludwig II of Bavaria, Alexandra's nephew, also known for notable eccentricity

== Ancestry ==
Ancestors of Princess Alexandra of Bavaria

8. Frederick Michael, Count Palatine of Zweibrücken
4. Maximilian I Joseph of Bavaria
9. Countess Palatine Maria Franziska of Sulzbach
2. Ludwig I of Bavaria
10. Prince George William of Hesse-Darmstadt
5. Princess Augusta Wilhelmine of Hesse-Darmstadt
11. Countess Maria Louise Albertine of Leiningen-Dagsburg-Falkenburg
1. Princess Alexandra of Bavaria
12. Ernest Frederick III, Duke of Saxe-Hildburghausen
6. Frederick, Duke of Saxe-Altenburg
13. Princess Ernestine of Saxe-Weimar-Eisenach
3. Princess Therese of Saxe-Hildburghausen
14. Charles II, Grand Duke of Mecklenburg-Strelitz
7. Duchess Charlotte Georgine of Mecklenburg-Strelitz
15. Princess Friederike of Hesse-Darmstadt

== Sources ==
- Rall, Hans. Wittelsbacher Lebensbilder von Kaiser Ludwig bis zur Gegenwart: Führer durch die Münchener Fürstengrüfte mit Verzeichnis aller Wittelsbacher Grablegen und Grabstätten. München: Wittelsbacher Ausgleichsfonds.
