= Archduchess Maria Luisa of Austria (1798–1857) =

European royalty

Maria Luisa
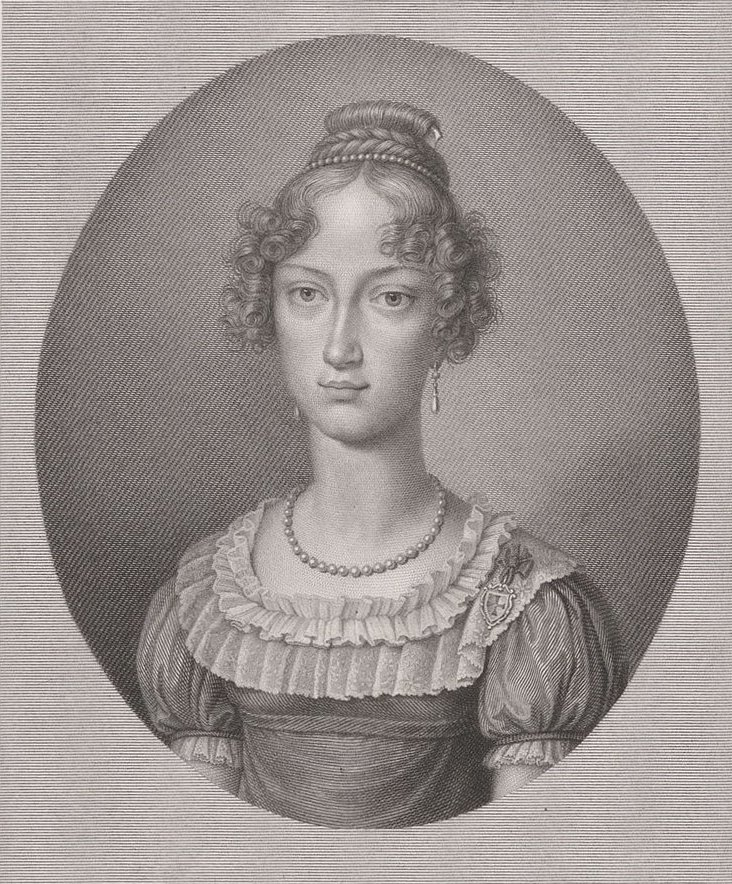
- Maria Luisa in 1822
- Born: 30 August 1798; Florence, Grand Duchy of Tuscany
- Died: 15 June 1857 (aged 58); Florence, Grand Duchy of Tuscany
Names
- Maria Luisa Giuseppa Cristina Rosa
- House: Habsburg-Lorraine
- Father: Ferdinand III, Grand Duke of Tuscany
- Mother: Luisa of Naples and Sicily

Archduchess Maria Luisa of Austria (30 August 1798 – 15 June 1857) was an Archduchess of Austria and Princess of Bohemia, as the daughter of Ferdinand III, Grand Duke of Tuscany and Luisa of Naples and Sicily. She was born with a deformity, and thus never married.

== Biography ==
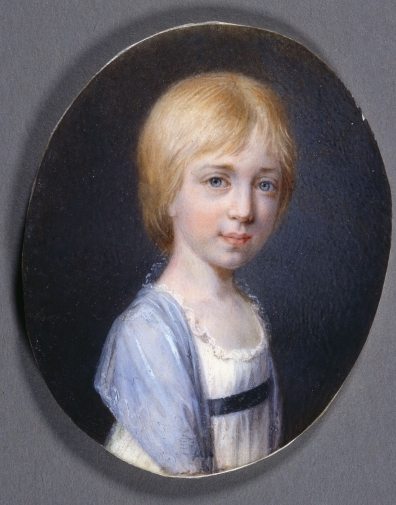
Archduchess Maria Luisa as a child

Archduchess Maria Luisa Giuseppa Cristina Rosa was born on 30 August 1798, in Florence. She was the second child and first daughter borne to Ferdinand III, Grand Duke of Tuscany and his wife Luisa of Naples and Sicily. The younger Maria Luisa grew up in Italy and Austria.

Maria Luisa's parents were double first cousins. Offspring from incestuous unions suffer increased risk of genetic illness; since her birth, Maria Luisa was disabled and had a deformity. Due to this, she was affectionately called "the little hunchback".

Maria Luisa and her family were known to have made regular visitations to Pisa, since 1814. She never married, or had children. Although she never met her in person, her great-niece and namesake, Crown Princess Louise of Saxony, who was born thirteen years after the Archduchess's death, wrote in her memoirs what she had heard about her:

Ten o'clock was the luncheon hour, when all the family met, and my great-aunt, Princess Louisa was always much in evidence. She was a dwarf, with the crooked, malicious mind that so often goes with a crooked body. She had very long, monkey-like arms, and whenever she was displeased she would fling them out like the sails of a windmill and hit whichever of her ladies-in-waiting happened to be standing nearest to her. She was an odious little creature and hated everybody who was young and pretty, with the result that she was cordially detested even by her own relations.

She died on 15 June 1857, aged 58.
