= Princess Luisa of Naples and Sicily =

Grand Duchess of Tuscany from 1790 to 1801

Luisa of Naples and Sicily
- Portrait by Joseph Dorffmeister, 1797

Grand Duchess consort of Tuscany
- Tenure: 15 August 1790 – 21 March 1801
- Born: 27 July 1773; Royal Palace of Naples, Naples
- Died: 19 September 1802 (aged 29); Hofburg Palace, Vienna, Archduchy of Austria, Holy Roman Empire
- Burial: Imperial Crypt
- Spouse: Ferdinand III, Grand Duke of Tuscany (m. 1790)
- Issue Detail: Leopold II, Grand Duke of Tuscany; Archduchess Maria Luisa; Maria Theresa, Queen of Sardinia
Names
- Luisa Maria Amalia Teresa
- House: Bourbon-Two Sicilies
- Father: Ferdinand I of the Two Sicilies
- Mother: Maria Carolina of Austria
- Coat of arms of Luisa Maria as Grand Duchess of Tuscany

Luisa Maria of Naples and Sicily (Luisa Maria Amalia Teresa; 27 July 1773 – 19 September 1802) was Grand Duchess of Tuscany as the wife of Ferdinand III, Grand Duke of Tuscany. She was born a princess of Naples and Sicily as a daughter born to Ferdinand I of the Two Sicilies and Maria Carolina of Austria.

After eleven years of marriage, Luisa and her husband, Ferdinand, were unwillingly forced into exile upon the Treaty of Aranjuez in 1801. The couple soon fled to Vienna, Austria, where they would stay for nearly a year until Ferdinand compensated with the Electorate of Salzburg, giving him titles and land. Luisa, however, died aged 29, before her husband re-ascended the throne.

== Life ==
=== Childhood (1773–1790) ===
Luisa Maria Amalia Teresa was born on 27 July 1773, at the Royal Palace of Naples. Her parents were Ferdinand I of the Two Sicilies and his wife, Maria Carolina of Austria. This made her a granddaughter of Empress Maria Theresa. Luisa was one of eighteen children, seven of whom survived into adulthood. She was often called Maria Luisa.

==== Appearance and personality ====
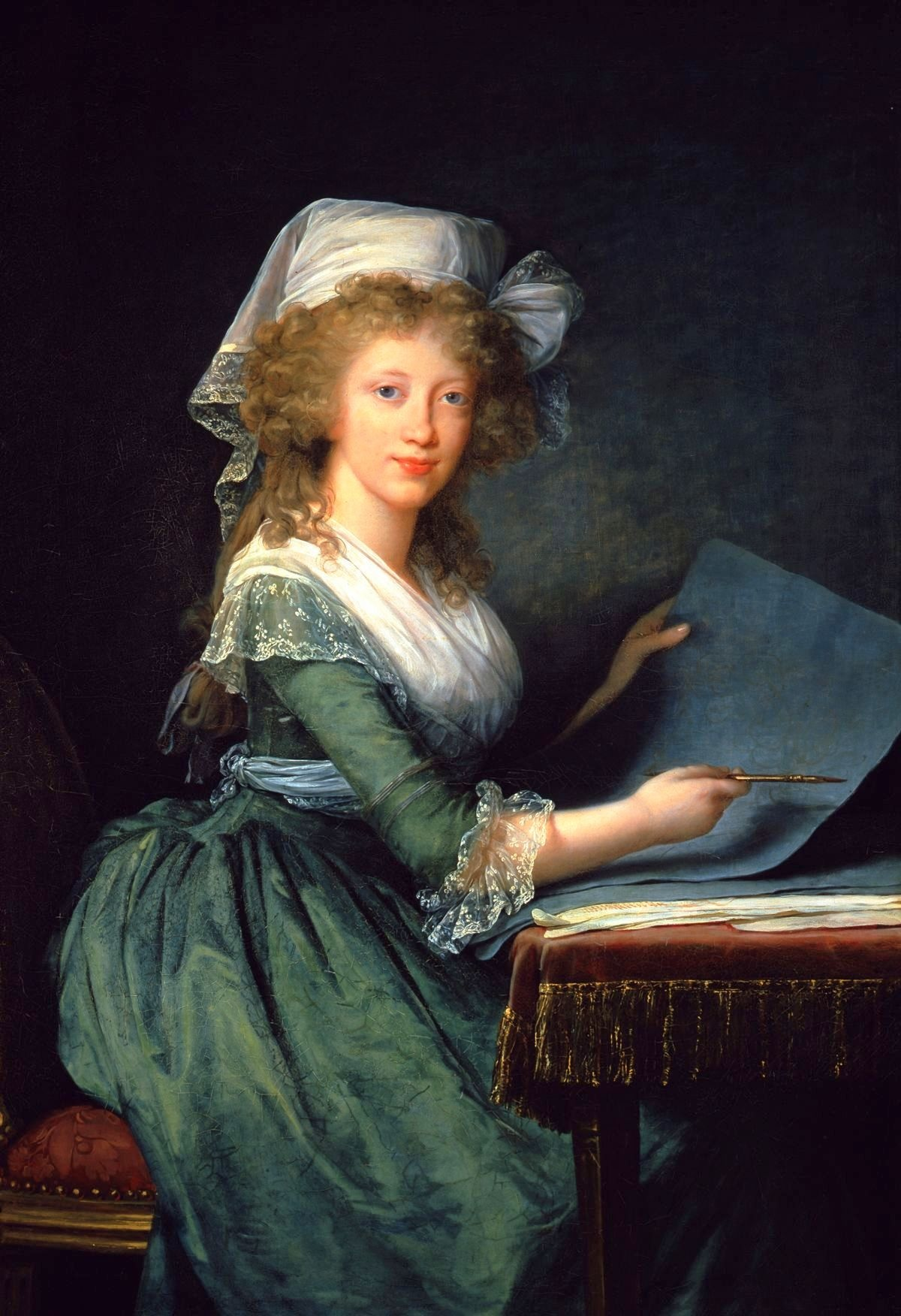
Portrait by Élisabeth Vigée Le Brun, 1790

In 1790 prominent French painter Élisabeth Vigée Le Brun was commissioned to paint portraits of Maria Carolina’s four eldest children—one of them being Maria Luisa. Though, whilst painting Luisa, Le Brun was reluctant to finish it due to Luisa’s features. Le Brun detailed the encounter in her memoirs, recalling:

". . . [Luisa] was extremely ugly and pulled such faces that I was most reluctant to finish her portrait."

Her mother, Queen Maria Carolina, had a bad opinion of Luisa, whom she described as imprudent and gossipy.

=== Marriage (1790–1802) ===
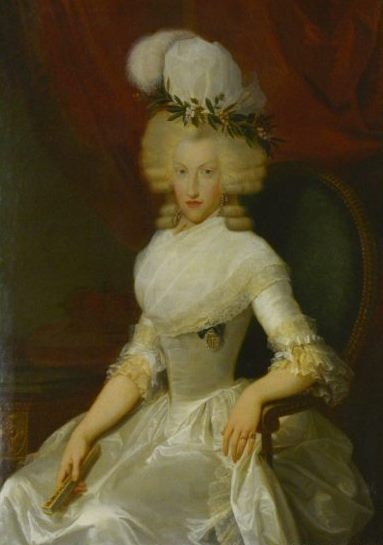
Portrait of Grand Duchess Luisa in 1792, by Pietro Benvenuti

On 15 August 1790, Maria Luisa married her cousin Ferdinand, Grand Duke of Tuscany, by proxy. The ceremony in person took place in Vienna on September 19th. Her husband ruled the Grand Duchy of Tuscany since 1790, but was forced into exile due to the Treaty of Aranjuez, in which he was forced by Napoleon, make way for the Kingdom of Etruria.

The couple both went into exile and lived in Vienna, the capital of the Austrian Empire, which was ruled by Archduke Ferdinand's elder brother, Emperor Francis II. Soon, Ferdinand was compensated by being given the secularized lands of the Archbishop of Salzburg as Grand-Duke of Salzburg.

=== Death ===
On 19 September 1802, upon a somewhat complicated childbirth, Maria Luisa died giving birth to a stillborn son at the Hofburg, in Vienna. She is currently buried in the Imperial Crypt in Vienna with her stillborn son.

==== Aftermath ====
Her husband outlived her by 23 years, he himself dying in 1824. Before his death, however, he had his Tuscan title reassumed—in 1814—after the title was held by Elisa Bonaparte. Ferdinand also remarried in 1821 to Princess Maria Ferdinanda of Saxony, though this marriage remained childless.

== Children ==
Luisa and Ferdinand had six children:

- Archduchess Carolina Ferdinanda Teresa (2 August 1793 – 5 January 1802); died in childhood.
- Archduke Francesco Leopoldo (15 December 1794 – 18 May 1800); died in childhood.
- Leopold II, Grand Duke of Tuscany (3 October 1797 – 29 January 1870); became Grand Duke of Tuscany, marrying Princess Maria Anna of Saxony and Princess Maria Antonia of the Two Sicilies. Had issue.
- Archduchess Maria Luisa Giuseppa (30 August 1799 – 15 June 1857); was born disabled and had a severe deformity. Due to this, she was affectionately called "the little hunchback" by the people of Florence. Never married, nor had issue.
- Archduchess Maria Theresa (21 March 1801 – 12 January 1855); became queen of Sardinia upon marriage to Charles Albert. Had issue.
- Stillborn son* (19 September 1802)

== Ancestry ==
Ancestors of Princess Luisa of Naples and Sicily

8. Philip V of Spain
4. Charles III of Spain
9. Elisabeth Farnese
2. Ferdinand I of the Two Sicilies
10. Augustus III of Poland
5. Maria Amalia of Saxony
11. Maria Josepha of Austria
1. Luisa of Naples and Sicily
12. Leopold, Duke of Lorraine
6. Francis I, Holy Roman Emperor
13. Élisabeth Charlotte of Orléans
3. Maria Carolina of Austria
14. Charles VI, Holy Roman Emperor
7. Maria Theresa of Austria
15. Elisabeth Christine of Brunswick

Princess Luisa of Naples and Sicily House of Bourbon-Two Sicilies Cadet branch of the House of Bourbon Born: 27 July 1773 Died: 9 September 1801
Royal titles
| Preceded by Infanta Maria Luisa of Spain | Grand Duchess consort of Tuscany; 1790–1801 | Succeeded by Maria Luisa of Bourbon as Queen consort of Etruria |
Titles in pretence
| Loss of title Grand duchy abolished for the creation of the Kingdom of Etruria, held by her first cousin Louis I of Etruria | — TITULAR — Titular Grand Duchess Consort of Tuscany; 1801–1802 | Title later revived for her husband (1814) |
