= Infanta Amalia of Spain =

Princess Adalbert of Bavaria (1834–1905)

Infanta Amalia
- Princess Adalbert of Bavaria
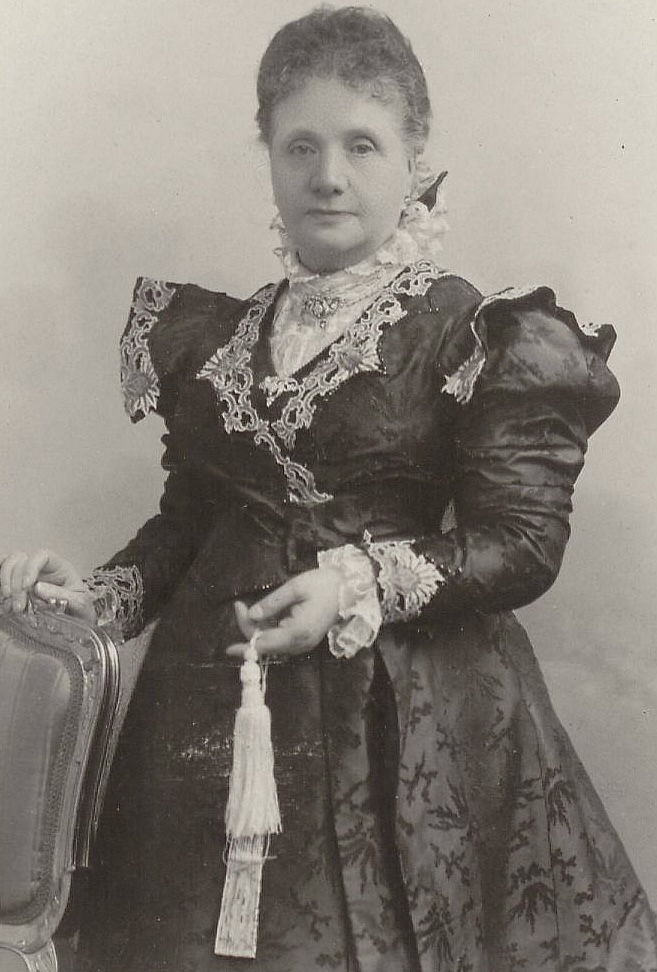
- Photograph c. 1905
- Born: 12 October 1834; Madrid, Spain
- Died: 27 August 1905 (aged 70); Nymphenburg Palace, Munich, (Kingdom of Bavaria) Germany
- Burial: St. Michael's Church, Munich, Germany
- Spouse: Prince Adalbert of Bavaria (m. 1856; died 1875)
- Issue: Prince Ludwig Ferdinand; Prince Alfons; Princess Isabella, Duchess of Genoa; Princess Elvira; Princess Clara
Names
- Amalia Filipina del Pilar Blasa Bonisa Vita Rita Lutgarda Romana Judas Tadea Alberta Josefa Ana Joaquina Los Doce Apostólicos Bonifacia Domenica Bibiana Verónica de Borbón y Borbón-Dos Sicilias
- House: Bourbon
- Father: Infante Francisco de Paula of Spain
- Mother: Princess Luisa Carlotta of the Two Sicilies

Infanta Amalia of Spain (Spanish: Amalia de Borbón y Borbón-Dos Sicilias; 12 October 1834 – 27 August 1905) was the youngest daughter of Infante Francisco de Paula of Spain. Her eldest brother, Francisco de Asís, married Queen Isabella II of Spain, who was Amalia's first cousin. She was one of only two of five sisters who made a royal marriage. In 1856, she married Prince Adalbert, a son of King Ludwig I of Bavaria. Upon her marriage, she moved to Munich, where she spent the rest of her life. However, she remained attached to her native country and was instrumental in arranging the marriage of her eldest son Prince Ludwig Ferdinand of Bavaria with her niece Infanta Paz of Spain.

== Childhood ==
She was born at the royal Palace of Madrid on 12 October 1834 as the eleventh child and sixth daughter of Infante Francisco de Paula of Spain, younger brother of King Fernando VII of Spain, and his wife, Princess Luisa Carlota of Bourbon-Two Sicilies. Infanta Amalia's mother was the niece of her father since her maternal grandmother, Infanta Maria Isabella of Spain, was the elder sister of Infante Francisco de Paula.

Baptized with the full name Amalia Filipina del Pilar Blasa Bonisa Vita Rita Lutgarda Romana Judas Tadea Alberta Josefa Ana Joaquina Los Doce Apostólicos Bonifacia Domenica Bibiana Verónica, she was born during the early reign of her first cousin Queen Isabella II, while her maternal aunt Queen Maria Christina was regent of the realm. However Amalia's mother, Princess Luisa Carlota, quarreled with her sister, and as a consequence they were expelled from Spain by the regent in 1838. The family moved to France living under the protection of their uncle Louis Philippe I, King of the French. After Queen Maria Christina fell from power in October 1840, Infanta Amalia's ambitious mother made the family return to the court of Madrid. Her mother died in January 1844, when she was nine years old. She grew up at the Spanish court and her education, shared with her feeble minded sister, Infanta Christina was rudimentary.

== Marriage ==
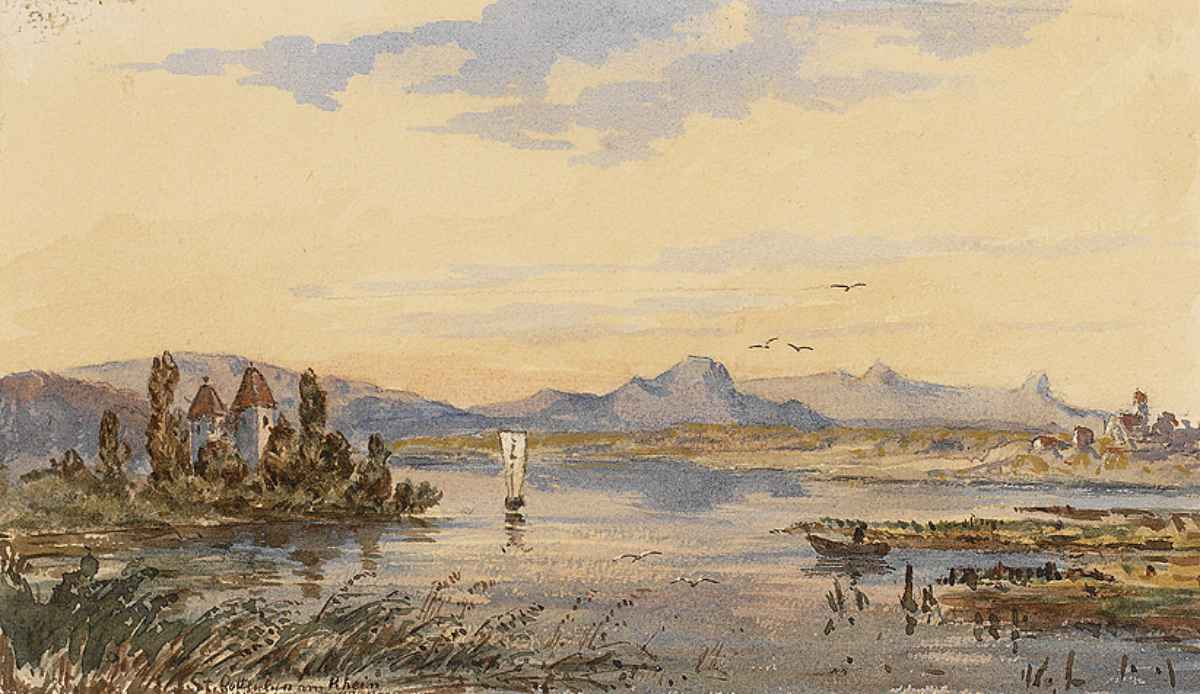
German landscape painted by Infanta Amalia

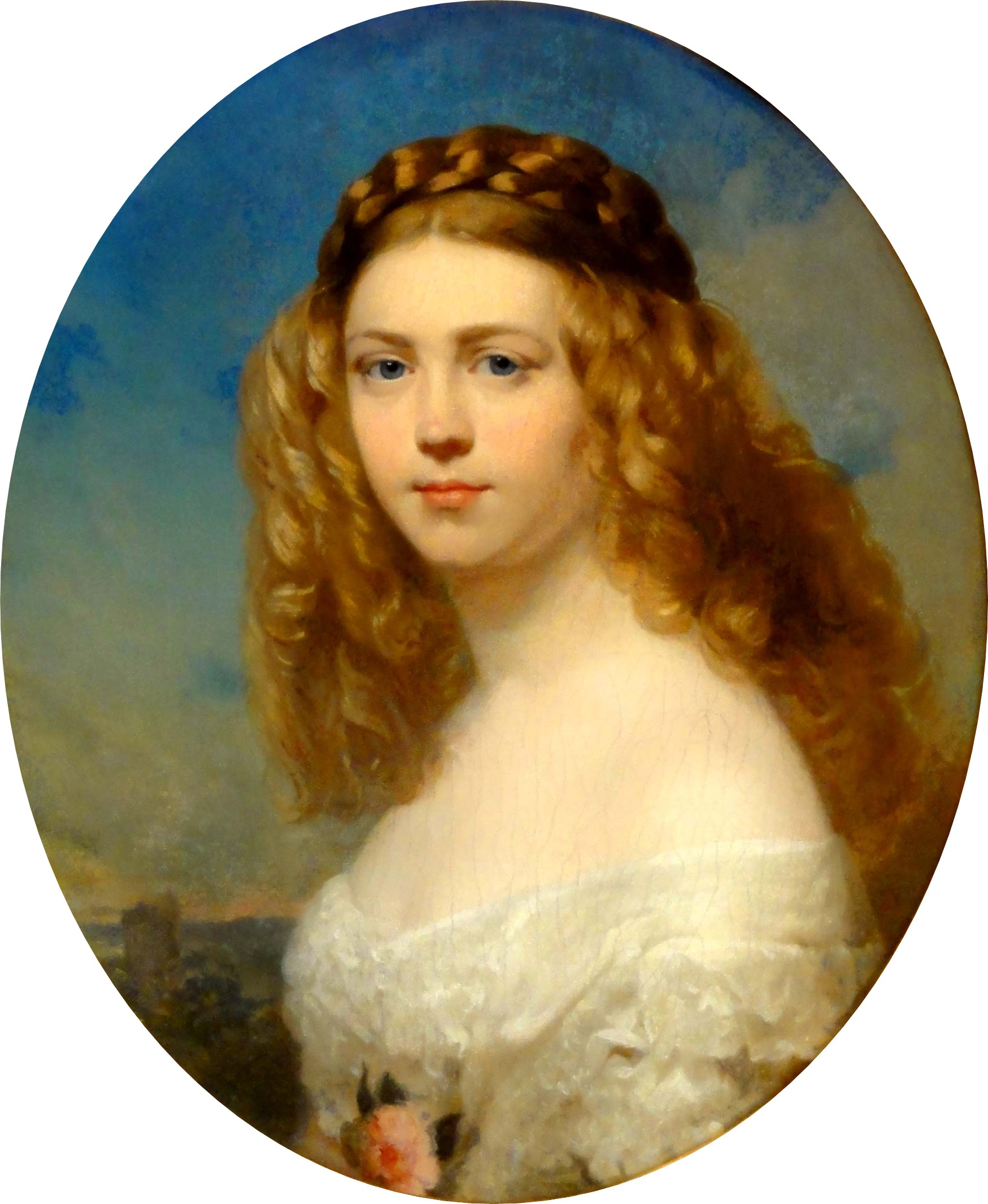
Portrait by Franz Xaver Winterhalter (1860).

By the age of twenty Infanta Amalia was the youngest of five unremarkable sisters, who had been almost forgotten at the Spanish court. However, she and her sister Christina were the only ones among the sisters to make a royal marriage.

In 1856, Prince Adalbert, fourth son and ninth child of King Ludwig I of Bavaria and Princess Therese of Saxe-Hildburghausen approached the Spanish court in search of a wife and Amalia was offered in marriage. When Prince Adalbert arrived in Madrid, Amalia was given a considerable dowry by her sister in law Queen Isabella. The marriage was celebrated on 25 August 1856 in Madrid. Upon her marriage Amalia became a Princess of Bavaria.

At her arrival at the Bavarian court her father in law, King Ludwig, a great admirer of female beauty, was disappointed when he met his new daughter-in-law, plump and plain. Infanta Amalia also shocked the court with her smoking habit. Her husband Prince Adalbert was as stout as she, but very tall. He loved drinking and had affairs, but their marriage endured. The couple had five children:

- Ludwig Ferdinand (1859–1949); married Infanta María de la Paz of Spain
- Alfons (1862–1933); married Princess Louise of Orleans, daughter of Prince Ferdinand, Duke of Alençon
- Isabella (1863–1924); married Prince Tommaso, Duke of Genoa
- Elvira (1865–1943); married Count Rudolf von Wrbna-Kaunitz-Rietberg-Questenberg und Freudenthal
- Klara (1867–1941); unmarried

== Later life and death ==
Although Infanta Amalia lived for the rest of her life in Munich, she remained attached to her native country. She visited Spain often and her eldest son Prince Ludwig Ferdinand of Bavaria was born at the royal palace of Madrid. She spent the winters at the residence of Munich and the summers at Nymphenburg Palace. Her husband died in 1875; Amalia outlived him by thirty years.

Amalia maintained her affiliation with Spain in the next generation. All of her five children spoke Spanish fluently and she encouraged her son Ludwig Ferdinand to marry her niece and goddaughter Infanta María de la Paz of Spain. The couple married in 1883.

She died in Nymphenburg Palace, aged 70, on 27 August 1905 and was interred at St. Michael's Church, Munich.

Coat of arms of Infanta Amalia, Princess of Bavaria

== Ancestry ==
Ancestors of Infanta Amalia of Spain

8. Charles III of Spain
4. Charles IV of Spain (= 14)
9. Maria Amalia of Saxony
2. Infante Francisco de Paula of Spain
10. Philip, Duke of Parma
5. Maria Luisa of Parma (= 15)
11. Louise-Élisabeth of France
1. Infanta Amalia of Spain
12. Ferdinand I of the Two Sicilies
6. Francis I of the Two Sicilies
13. Maria Carolina of Austria
3. Princess Luisa Carlotta of the Two Sicilies
14. Charles IV of Spain (= 4)
7. Maria Isabella of Spain
15. Maria Luisa of Parma (= 5)
