= Maria Theresa of Austria, Queen of Sardinia =

Queen of Sardinia from 1831 to 1849

Maria Theresa of Tuscany
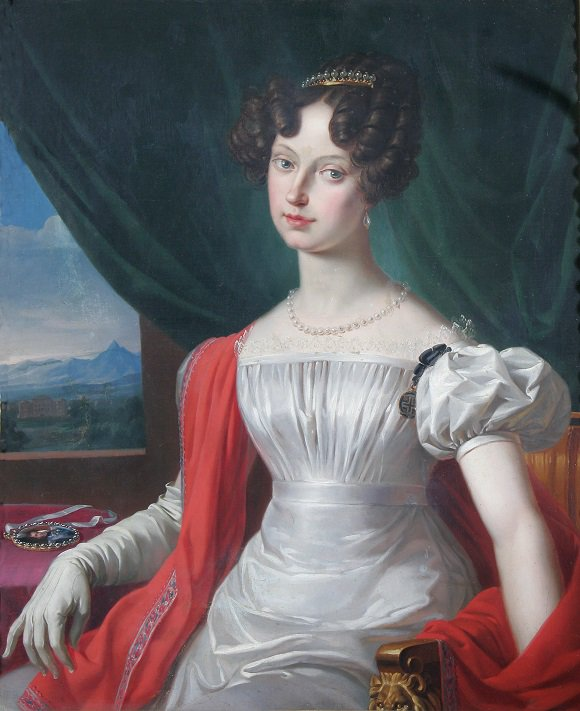
- Portrait by Pietro Benvenuti

Queen consort of Sardinia
- Tenure: 27 April 1831 – 23 March 1849
- Born: 21 March 1801; Vienna, Archduchy of Austria, Holy Roman Empire
- Died: 12 January 1855 (aged 53); Turin, Kingdom of Sardinia
- Burial: 16 January 1855; Basilica of Superga, Italy
- Spouse: Charles Albert of Sardinia (m. 1817; died 1849)
- Issue Detail: Victor Emmanuel II of Italy; Ferdinand, Duke of Genoa
Names
- Maria Teresa Francesca Giuseppa Giovanna Benedetta
- House: Habsburg-Lorraine
- Father: Ferdinand III, Grand Duke of Tuscany
- Mother: Luisa of Naples and Sicily

Maria Theresa of Tuscany (21 March 1801 – 12 January 1855) was Queen of Sardinia by marriage to King Charles Albert of Sardinia.

She was a daughter of Ferdinand III, Grand Duke of Tuscany and Luisa of Naples and Sicily. She was named after her great-grandmother Empress Maria Theresa. In 1817, she married Charles Albert of Sardinia and subsequently became the Queen of Sardinia upon her husband's accession to the throne in 1831.

== Life ==
=== Early life ===
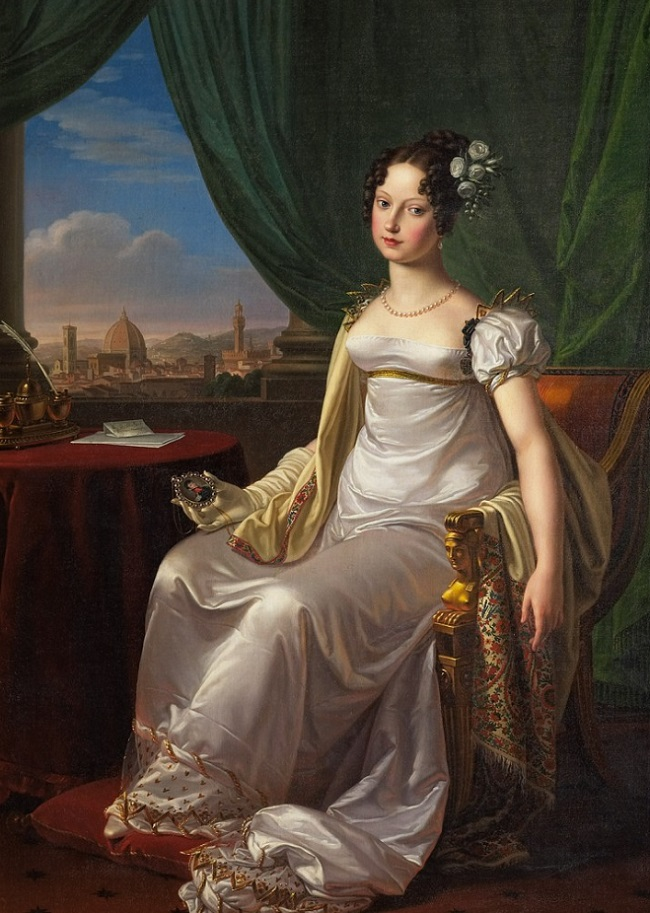
Portrait by Benvenuti, 1817

Maria Theresia Franziska Josefa Johanna Benedikte was a member of the Tuscan branch of the House of Habsburg-Lorraine, and an Archduchess of Austria and Princess of Bohemia, Hungary and Tuscany by birth. She was born in Vienna during the exile of her parents and their many children, due to Napoleon Bonaparte's invasion of Tuscany. Her father was Ferdinand III, Grand Duke of Tuscany and her mother was Princess Luisa of Naples and Sicily, who died giving birth to a stillborn son one year after Maria Theresa's birth.

In 1805, Ferdinand III was made Elector of the Electorate of Salzburg, and the family moved to Würzburg.

=== Marriage ===
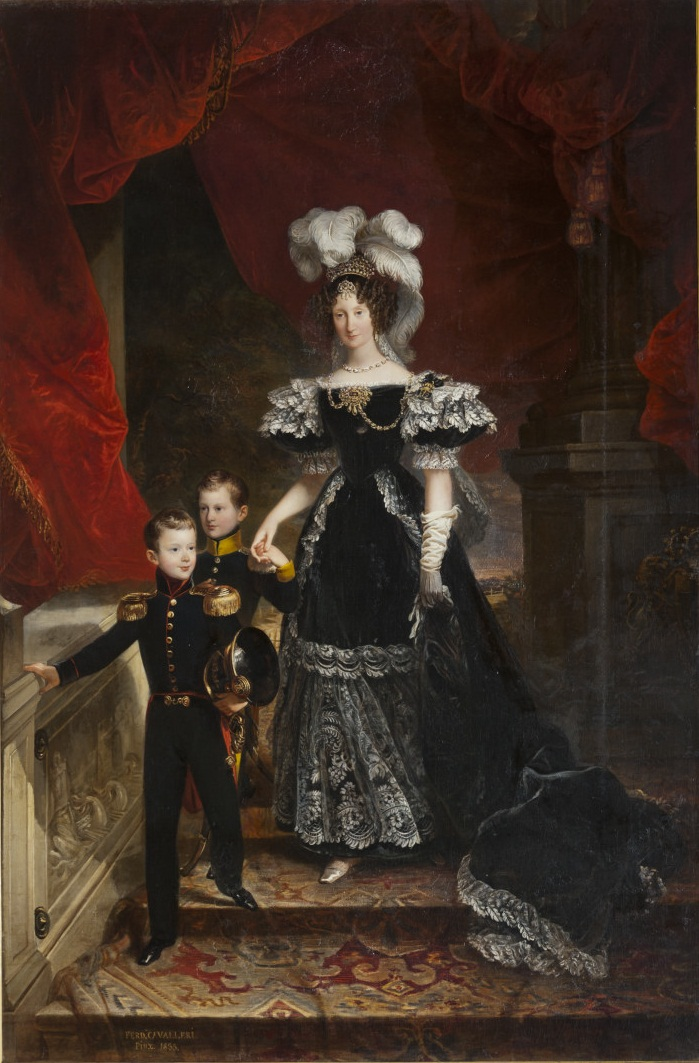
Queen Maria Theresa of Sardinia with her two sons, by Ferdinando Cavalleri (1832)

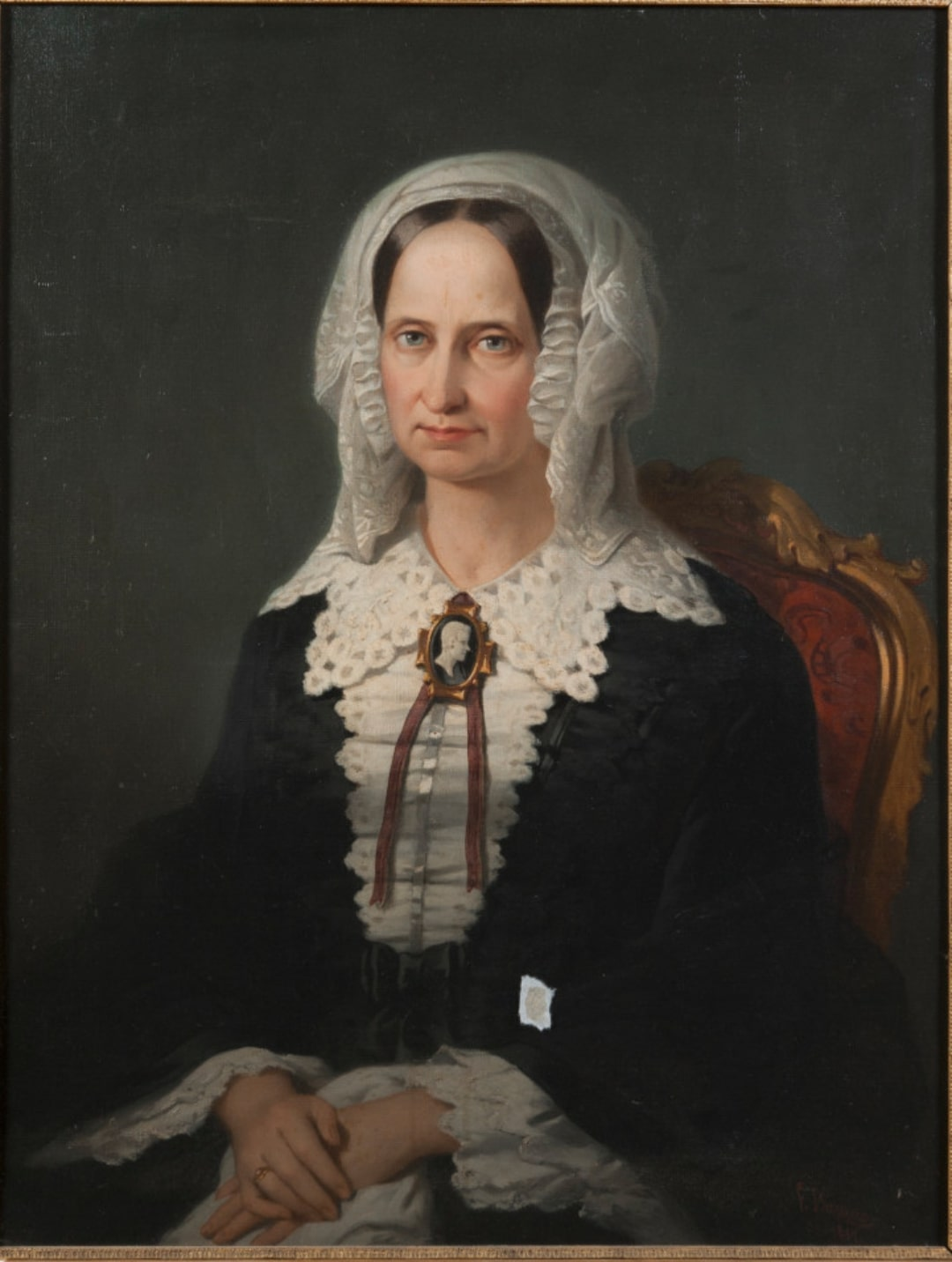
Maria Theresa as a widow in 1853, portrait by Felice Barucco

Maria Theresa married in Florence on 30 September 1817 to Charles Albert, prince of Carignano. A wedding mass was celebrated on 2 October in Florence Cathedral. In Italian, her name was Maria Teresa Francesca Giuseppa Giovanna Benedetta. From her marriage, she was known as the Princess of Carignano.

She was described as innocent, naive and shy.

In March 1820, an heir was born, followed by two more children, the latter of which died in infancy. In 1824, Charles Albert was recognised as heir to the throne by King Charles Felix.

=== Queen of Sardinia ===
Maria Theresa became Queen of Sardinia in 1831, when Charles Albert succeeded Charles Felix, who died without issue.

During the reign of her spouse, Maria Theresa did not involve herself in state affairs, reportedly devoting her time solely to her family and religion. She was described as a strict Catholic but also as a spontaneous and affectionate family oriented person.

=== Later life ===
After the death of her husband in 1849 in Porto, the Queen mother, Maria Theresa, stopped appearing in public.

While she never involved in politics as queen, she did engage in state affairs during the reign of her son. When the reforms against the privileges of the Church was introduced by the Cavour government in 1854, she united with her daughter-in-law to pressure her son to prevent the reform with the argument that the reform was hostile against the Church and thus unacceptable for a Christian. The effort was, however, unsuccessful.

She died in Turin, and is buried in the Basilica of Superga.

== Issue ==
- Vittorio Emanuele Maria Alberto Eugenio Ferdinando Tommaso (14 March 1820 – 9 January 1878); married Adelaide of Austria and had issue. He would become the first king of united Italy.
- Ferdinando Maria Alberto Amedeo Filiberto Vincenzo (15 November 1822 – 10 February 1855); married Princess Elisabeth of Saxony and had issue. He became Duke of Genoa.
- Maria Cristina (4 July 1826 – 25 July 1827); died in infancy.

== Genealogy ==
Even among the frequently tangled genealogies of European nobility, the ancestry of Maria Theresa of Tuscany was unusual. In fact, her parents had the same four grandparents, so they were double cousins when they married: this practice of alliances between cousins was still common at that time, given that the families (and notably, including the parents and grandparents of Maria Theresa) had a lot of children, and this avoided dividing the benefit of heirs too much through alliances and their descendants, and the multiplication of nobility titles to satisfy the various claims by descendants.

As a consequence, her grandparents consisted of two brother/sister pairs. Her paternal grandfather, Leopold II, Holy Roman Emperor, was the brother of her maternal grandmother, Maria Carolina of Austria. Matching that combination, her paternal grandmother, Maria Luisa of Spain, was the sister of her maternal grandfather, Ferdinand I of the Two Sicilies. Because of this she only had four great-grandparents rather than the usual eight. (Although not so unusual, it may be worth pointing out that her grandmothers and great-grandmothers, as well as her mother or herself and her sister, or her daughter were all surnamed "Maria".)

Family of Maria Theresa of Austria, Queen of Sardinia

Francis I, Holy Roman Emperor	Maria Theresa, Archduchess of Austria	Charles III, King of Spain	Maria Amalia, Princess of Saxony
Leopold II, Holy Roman Emperor	Maria Louisa, Infanta of Spain	Ferdinand I, King of the Two Sicilies	Maria Carolina, Archduchess of Austria
Ferdinand III, Grand Duke of Tuscany	Luisa, Princess of Naples and Sicily
Carolina Ferdinanda, Archduchess of Austria	Francesco Leopoldo, Grand Prince of Tuscany	Leopold II, Grand Duke of Tuscany	Maria Luisa, Archduchess of Austria	Charles Albert, King of Sardinia	Maria Theresa, Archduchess of Austria	Unnamed stillborn, Archduke of Austria
Victor Emmanuel II, King of Italy	Ferdinand, Duke of Genoa	Maria Cristina, Princess of Savoy

Maria Theresa of Austria, Queen of Sardinia House of Habsburg-Lorraine Cadet branch of the House of Lorraine Born: 21 March 1801 Died: 12 January 1855
Italian royalty
Preceded by Maria Cristina of Naples and Sicily	Queen consort of Sardinia; 27 April 1831 – 23 March 1849	Succeeded by Adelaide of Austria
