= Princess Elisabeth of Saxony =

Elisabeth of Saxony
- Duchess of Genoa; Marchioness of Rapallo
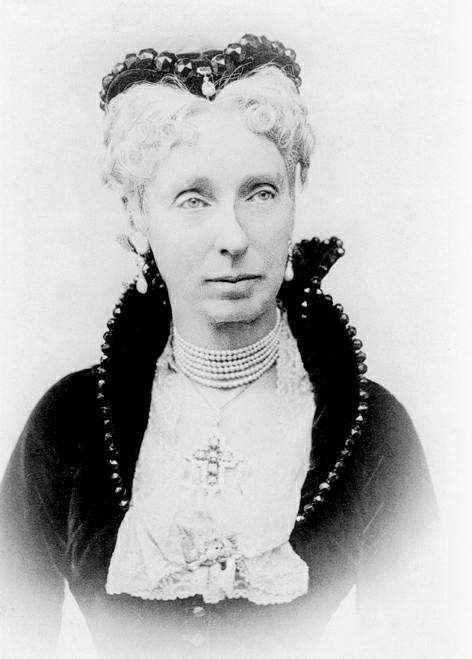
- Princess Elisabeth c. 1880
- Born: 4 February 1830; Dresden, Kingdom of Saxony
- Died: 14 August 1912 (aged 82); Stresa, Piedmont, Kingdom of Italy
- Spouse: Prince Ferdinand, Duke of Genoa (m. 1850; died 1855) Niccolò Bernoud, Marquess of Rapallo (m. 1856; died 1882)
- Issue: Margherita, Queen of Italy; Prince Tommaso, Duke of Genoa
Names
- Maria Elisabeth Maximiliana Ludovika Amalie Franziska Sophia Leopoldine Anna Baptista Xaveria Nepomucena
- House: Wettin
- Father: John of Saxony
- Mother: Amalie Auguste of Bavaria

Elisabeth of Saxony (4 February 1830 – 14 August 1912) was a Princess of Saxony who married the second son of the King of Sardinia. She was the mother of Margherita, Queen of Italy.

== Early life and family ==
She was born in Dresden, capital of Saxony, as daughter of King John of Saxony and his wife Princess Amalie of Bavaria. Her paternal grandparents were Prince Maximilian of Saxony and Carolina of Parma. Her maternal grandparents were King Maximilian I of Bavaria and Karoline of Baden.

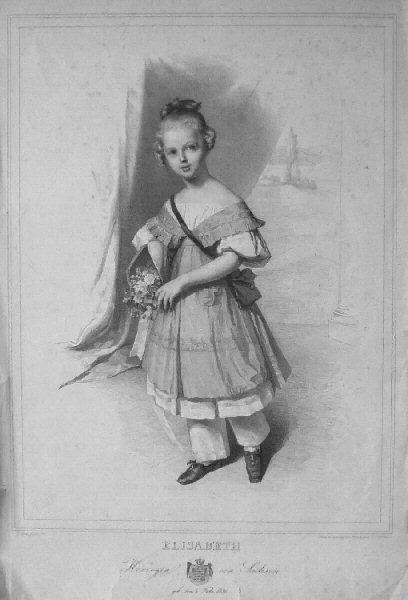
Elisabeth at the age of seven

== Marriages and issue ==
On 22 April 1850, she married, in Dresden Cathedral, Prince Ferdinand, 1st Duke of Genoa, second son of King Charles Albert of Sardinia and Maria Theresa of Tuscany. Their marriage was a dynastic arrangement, and it was generally held to be loveless.

The couple had two children:

Image	Name	Birth	Death	Notes
	Margherita Maria Teresa Giovanna	Palazzo Chiablese, 20 November 1851	Bordighera, 4 January 1926	married Umberto I of Italy; had issue.
	Tommaso Alberto Vittorio, 2nd Duke of Genoa	Palazzo Chiablese, 6 February 1854	Turin, 15 April 1931	married Princess Isabella of Bavaria; had issue.

On 10 February 1855 her husband died in Turin, leaving Elizabeth a widow at the age of 25.

Before her second year of widowhood had ended, she remarried on 4 October 1856 with her chamberlain Niccolò Bernoud, Marchese di Rapallo. They married secretly, before her period of official mourning was over. This act so infuriated her brother-in-law Victor Emmanuel II of Italy that he ordered her into virtual exile and disallowed her from seeing her two children. They were later reunited, however.

In 1882, her second husband committed suicide. Court gossip had often hinted that their marriage was unhappy, and his suicide added fuel to these stories. Elisabeth had no children from her second marriage.

== Death ==
Elisabeth suffered an attack of apoplexy in 1910, which caused her health to quickly deteriorate. She died in Piedmont, Kingdom of Italy, on 14 August 1912, at the age of 82. Out of her parents' six daughters, she was the only one to live past the age of thirty.

== Ancestry ==
Ancestors of Princess Elisabeth of Saxony

16. Augustus III of Poland
8. Frederick Christian, Elector of Saxony
17. Maria Josepha of Austria
4. Maximilian, Hereditary Prince of Saxony
18. Charles VII, Holy Roman Emperor
9. Duchess Maria Antonia of Bavaria
19. Maria Amalia of Austria
2. John of Saxony
20. Philip, Duke of Parma
10. Ferdinand, Duke of Parma
21. Louise Élisabeth of France
5. Princess Carolina of Parma
22. Francis I, Holy Roman Emperor
11. Archduchess Maria Amalia of Austria
23. Maria Theresa of Austria
1. Princess Elisabeth of Saxony
24. Christian III, Count Palatine of Zweibrücken
12. Frederick Michael, Count Palatine of Zweibrücken
25. Caroline of Nassau-Saarbrücken
6. Maximilian I Joseph of Bavaria
26. Joseph Charles, Count Palatine of Sulzbach
13. Countess Palatine Maria Franziska of Sulzbach
27. Countess Palatine Elisabeth of Neuburg
3. Princess Amalie Auguste of Bavaria
28. Charles Frederick, Grand Duke of Baden
14. Charles Louis, Hereditary Prince of Baden
29. Princess Caroline Louise of Hesse-Darmstadt
7. Princess Caroline of Baden
30. Louis IX, Landgrave of Hesse-Darmstadt
15. Princess Amalie of Hesse-Darmstadt
31. Countess Palatine Caroline of Zweibrücken
