= Prince Ferdinando, Duke of Genoa (1822–1855) =

Prince Ferdinando
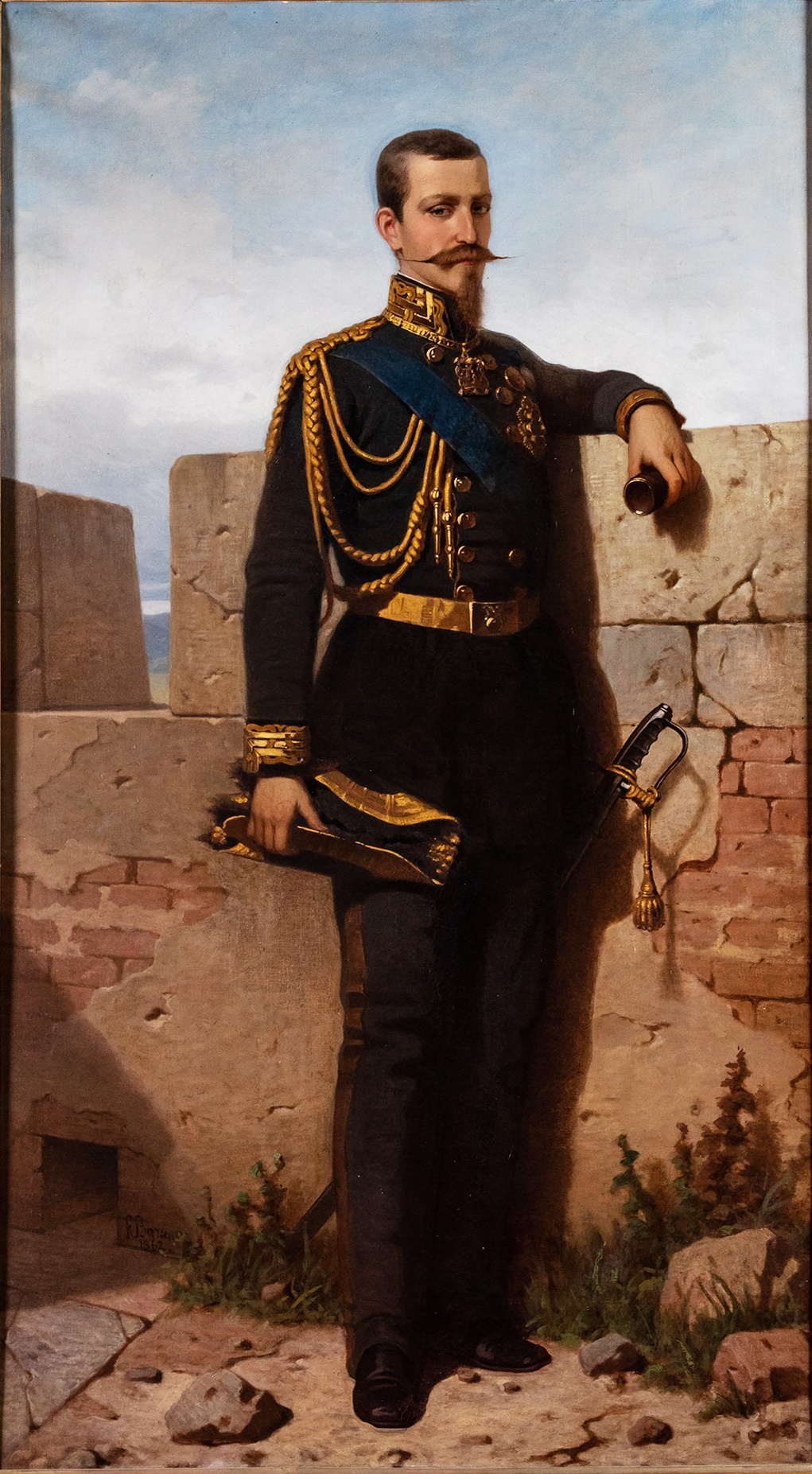
- Painting of Prince Ferdinand

Duke of Genoa
- Tenure: 27 April 1831 – 10 February 1855
- Predecessor: Carlo Felice
- Successor: Tommaso
- Born: 15 November 1822; Florence, Grand Duchy of Tuscany
- Died: 10 February 1855 (aged 32); Turin, Kingdom of Sardinia
- Spouse: Princess Elisabeth of Saxony (m. 1850)
- Issue: Margherita, Queen of Italy; Prince Tommaso, Duke of Genoa
Names
- Ferdinando Maria Alberto Amedeo Filiberto Vincenzo di Savoia
- House: Savoy-Genoa
- Father: Charles Albert of Sardinia
- Mother: Maria Theresa of Tuscany
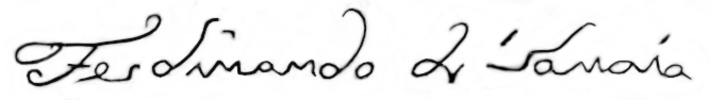
- Signature

Prince Ferdinando of Savoy, 1st Duke of Genoa (Ferdinando Maria Alberto Amedeo Filiberto Vincenzo; 15 November 1822 – 10 February 1855) was the founder of the Genoa branch of the House of Savoy.

== Biography ==
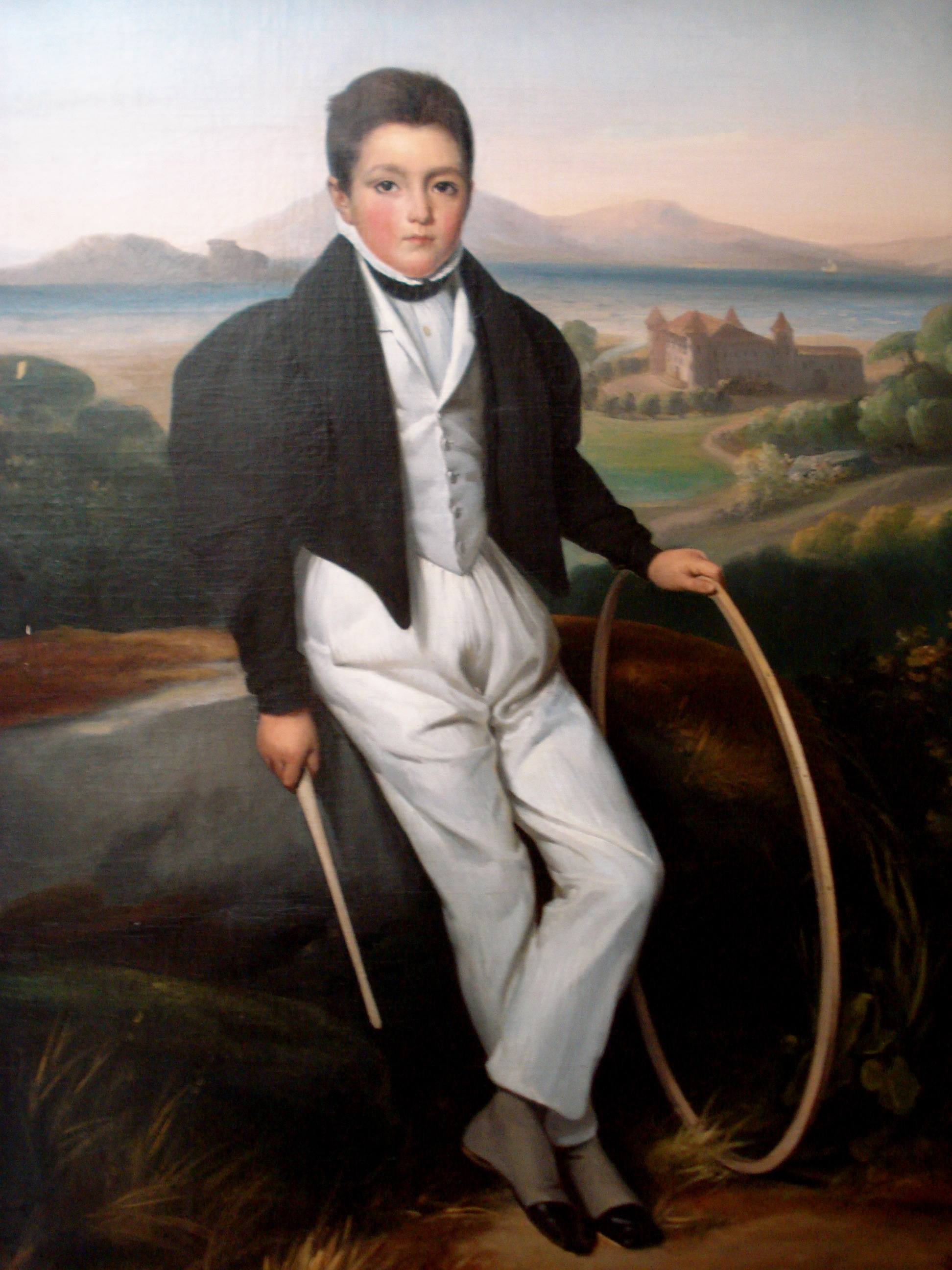
Portrait of Ferdinando of Savoy, by Valbrun Alexis Leon Louis, Paris, 1833. Private collection

Prince Ferdinando was born in Florence, the second son of Charles Albert, Prince of Carignano and Maria Theresa of Tuscany. His father was the head of the House of Savoy-Carignano, a cadet branch of the House of Savoy. The senior line of the house became extinct in 1831, and his father succeeded as King of Sardinia. With the ascension of his father, he was created Duke of Genoa.

During the wars taking place on the Italian Peninsula in 1848 and 1849, Prince Ferdinando commanded an army division. After peace was restored in Italy, he was appointed general commandant of the artillery and set about making improvements.

As a result of the Sicilian revolution of independence, he was a candidate for the throne. He was the most acceptable candidate to Britain, and the British Minister in Turin informed him they would recognise him as king as soon as he took possession of the throne. On 11 July 1848, the national assembly of Sicily unanimously voted to offer him the throne. When the Sicilian deputation arrived to offer him the throne, he was absent from Royal headquarters as he was commanding a division in the army. After Sardinia's defeat by the forces of the Austrian Empire commanded by Joseph Radetzky von Radetz he felt compelled to decline the opportunity to become King of Sicily.

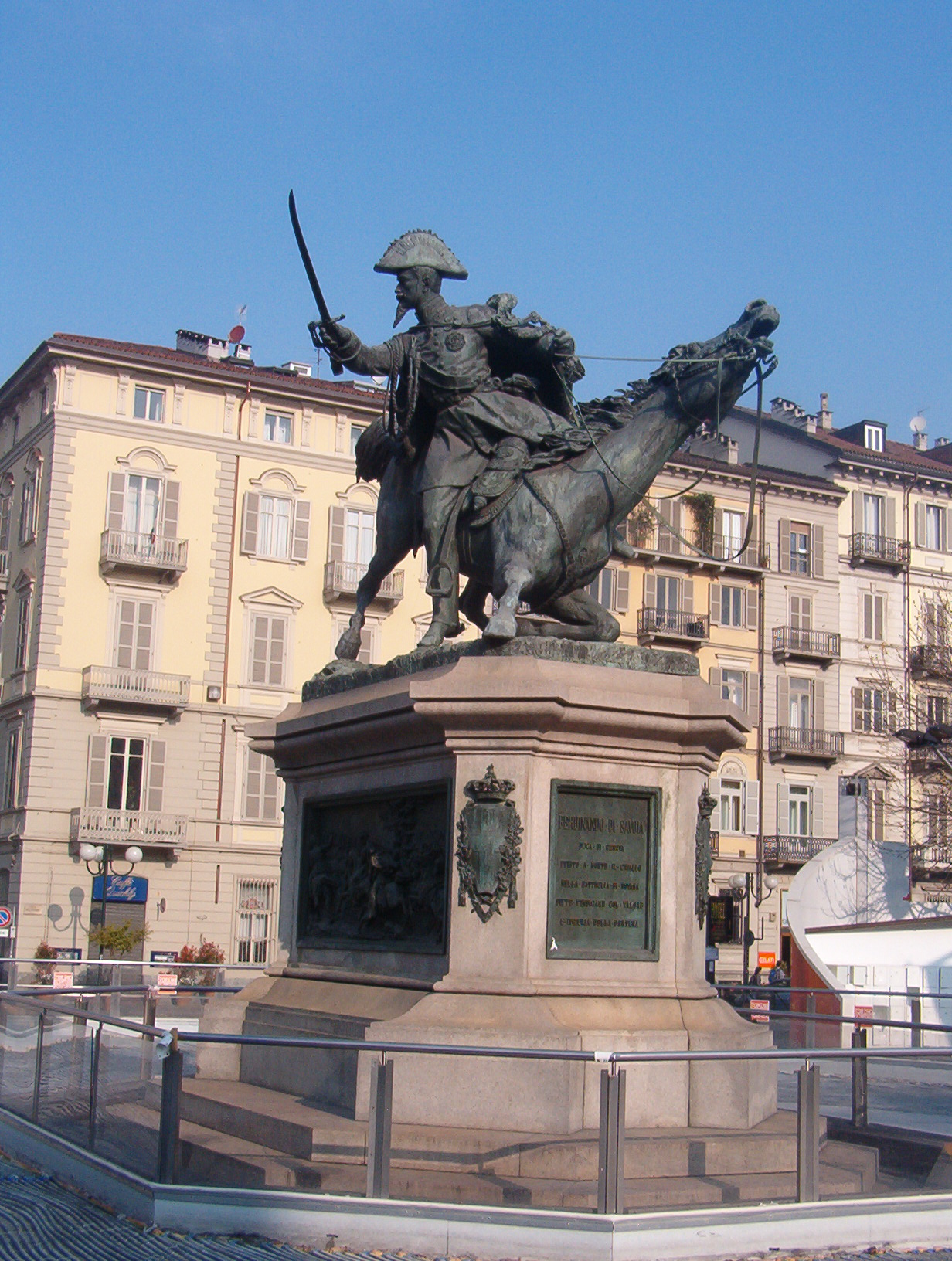
Statue of Ferdinando of Savoy, by Alfonso Balzico, Turin, 19th century.

During the Crimean War, he was to be appointed to command the Kingdom of Sardinia's auxiliary corps but his declining health meant he could not take up the posting.

His health did not recover, and he died in Turin at the age thirty-two. He is buried in the Royal Crypt of the Basilica of Superga. His one-year-old son Thomas succeeded to the title Duke of Genoa.

== Marriage and children ==
Prince Ferdinando married Princess Elisabeth of Saxony, daughter of King John of Saxony and Princess Amalie of Bavaria, on 22 April 1850 in Dresden at the Dresden Cathedral. They had two children:

- Princess Margherita of Savoy-Genoa (20 November 1851, Palazzo Chiablese – 4 January 1926, Bordighera); married Umberto I of Italy and had issue.
- Prince Tommaso, 2nd Duke of Genoa (6 February 1854, Palazzo Chiablese – 15 April 1931, Turin); married Princess Isabella of Bavaria and had issue.

== Ancestry ==
Ancestors of Prince Ferdinando, Duke of Genoa (1822–1855)

16. Louis Victor, Prince of Carignano
8. Victor Amadeus II, Prince of Carignano
17. Landgravine Christine of Hesse-Rotenburg
4. Charles Emmanuel, Prince of Carignano
18. Louis de Lorraine, prince de Brionne
9. Joséphine of Lorraine
19. Louise de Rohan
2. Charles Albert of Sardinia
20. Augustus III of Poland
10. Charles, Duke of Courland
21. Maria Josepha of Austria
5. Maria Christina of Saxony
22. Stanisław Krasiński
11. Franciszka Krasińska
23. Aniela Humięcka
1. Prince Ferdinando, Duke of Genoa
24. Francis I, Holy Roman Emperor
12. Leopold II, Holy Roman Emperor
25. Maria Theresa of Austria
6. Ferdinand III of Tuscany
26. Charles III of Spain
13. Maria Luisa of Spain
27. Maria Amalia of Saxony
3. Maria Theresa of Austria
28. Charles III of Spain (= 26)
14. Ferdinand I of the Two Sicilies
29. Maria Amalia of Saxony (= 27)
7. Luisa of Naples and Sicily
30. Francis I, Holy Roman Emperor (= 24)
15. Maria Carolina of Austria
31. Maria Theresa of Austria (= 25)

New title	Duke of Genoa; 1831–1855	Succeeded by Thomas, Duke of Genoa
