= Therese of Saxe-Hildburghausen =

Queen of Bavaria from 1825 to 1848

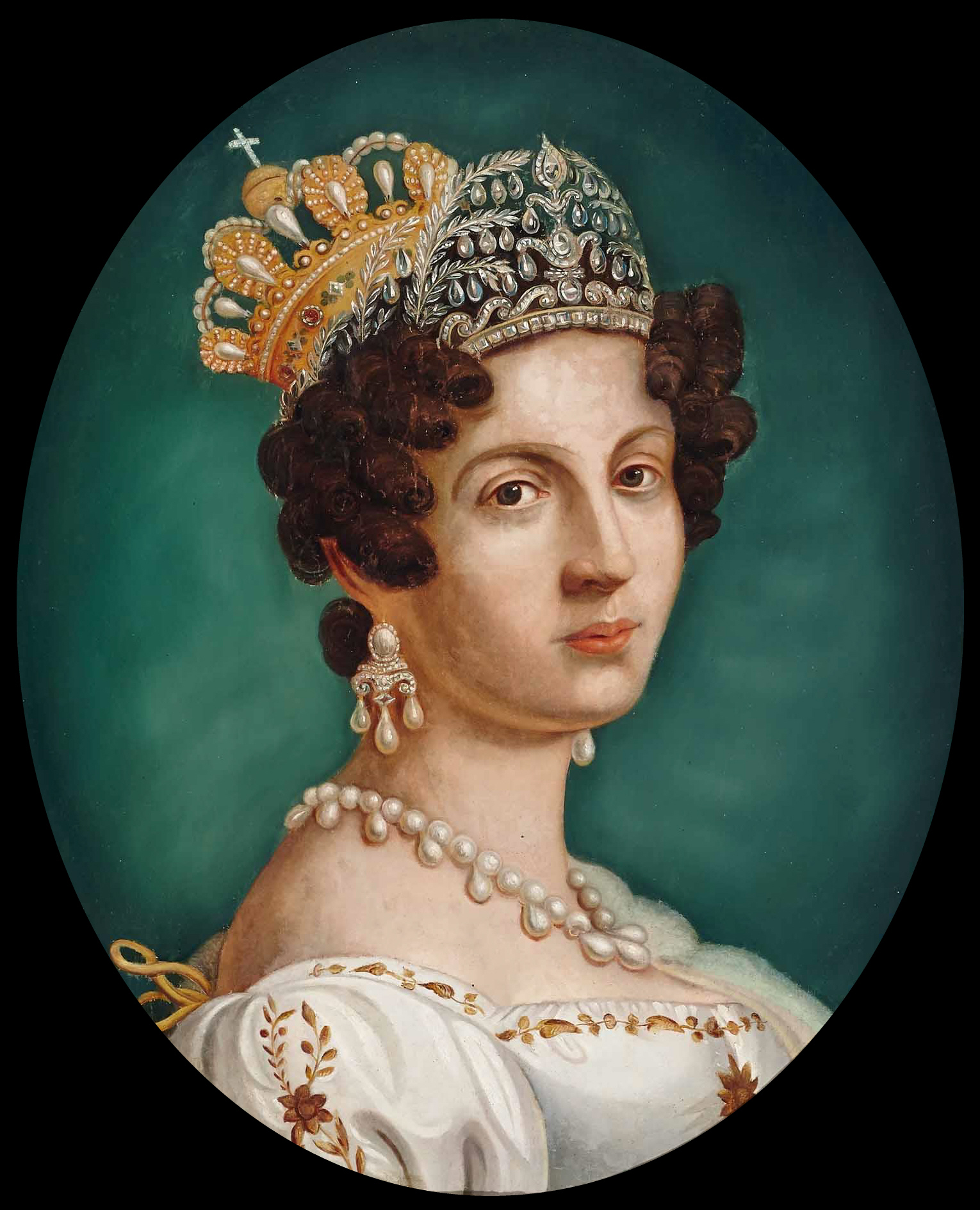

Queen consort of Bavaria
- Tenure: 13 October 1825 – 20 March 1848
- Born: 8 July 1792; Seidingstadt, Duchy of Saxe-Hildburghausen
- Died: 26 October 1854 (aged 62); Munich, Kingdom of Bavaria
- Burial: St Boniface's Abbey, Munich
- Spouse: Ludwig I of Bavaria (m. 1810)
- Issue: Maximilian II of Bavaria; Mathilde Caroline, Grand Duchess of Hesse and by Rhine; Otto I of Greece; Luitpold, Prince Regent of Bavaria; Adelgunde, Duchess of Modena; Archduchess Hildegard, Duchess of Teschen; Princess Alexandra; Prince Adalbert
Names
- Therese Charlotte Luise
- House: Wettin
- Father: Frederick, Duke of Saxe-Altenburg
- Mother: Charlotte Georgine of Mecklenburg-Strelitz

Therese Charlotte Luise of Saxe-Hildburghausen (8 July 1792 – 26 October 1854) was Queen of Bavaria, as the wife of King Ludwig I, from his accession in 1825 to his abdication in 1848. Oktoberfest was created in honour of their wedding and is still celebrated annually on Theresienwiese in Munich. Therese was popular amongst the people of Bavaria, and was heavily involved in her husband's politics, as well as her own charity work.

== Biography ==
Therese was a daughter of Frederick, Duke of Saxe-Altenburg, and Duchess Charlotte Georgine of Mecklenburg-Strelitz, eldest daughter of Charles II, Grand Duke of Mecklenburg-Strelitz. In 1809, she was on the list of possible brides for Napoleon, but on 12 October 1810 married the Bavarian crown prince Ludwig. Their wedding was the occasion of the first ever Oktoberfest.

She became queen in 1825. During the numerous love affairs of her husband, Therese suffered but tolerated the situation. She did not refrain, however, from demonstrating her disapproval in discreet ways; in 1831, she left town during one of his affairs, and she strictly rejected associating with the mistresses. Therese often assisted with the administration of the kingdom of Bavaria, especially when Ludwig was absent from Munich during his numerous journeys, and she did have some political influence and participated in political issues. She was very popular and was considered to embody an ideal image of queen, wife and mother. She was involved in a great number of charitable organizations for widows, orphans and the poor. She was the object of great sympathy during her husband's infidelity with Lola Montez, which was one of many factors that contributed to his unpopularity and his abdication in 1848.

== Wedding and Oktoberfest ==
On the evening of 12 October 1810, Therese and Ludwig married in the court chapel of Munich, which marked the first royal wedding in Munich since 1722. The kingdom of Bavaria was only 4 years old at that time, and showcased its splendour during a 5-day wedding celebration. The festivities began on Max-Joseph-Platz the following day. The city was illuminated and included a folk festival, a free opera, a play, a ball and a music academy.

On 17 October, the last day of celebrations, The National Guard Cavalry organized a large horse race on the square in front of the Sendlinger Tor. The newlywed couple was greeted by nine farm couples of the new administrative districts of the Bavarian Kingdom dressed in traditional garb. Therese wore a dress made with the Bavarian national colours and the area was then named Theresienwiese in honour of the crown princess. Due to her popularity amongst the people, the celebrations were repeated the following year and evolved to become the still celebrated Oktoberfest.

Saxe-Hildburghausen had a heavy burden to bear because of the costs of the royal wedding and dowry of the bride. On 26 June 1811 Therese's father, Duke Friedrich, noted that he was unable to pay for the wedding from the current budget.

== Social and political work ==
=== Political involvement ===
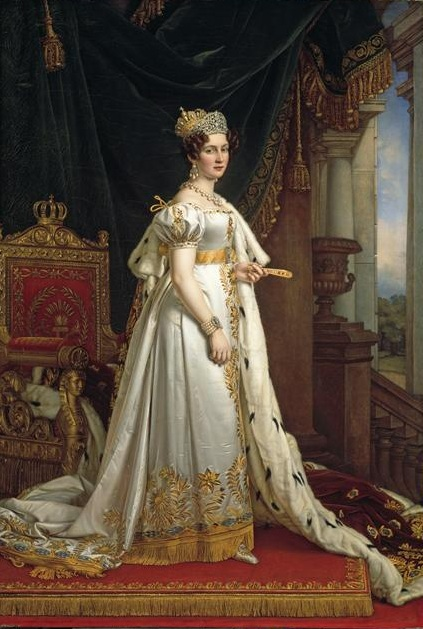
Portrait by Joseph Stieler, 1826

During her husband's reign as king of Bavaria, Therese showed interest in state affairs and was considered a political companion to her husband. Whenever Ludwig was away from Munich, she would inform him about court and country events. In March of 1830, she collected newspaper articles from both the French Journal de Débats and various German newspapers in order to bring Ludwig's attention to the emerging July Revolution. She believed that the king should know everything that was going on in his country. She also kept their son Otto, who was in Greece, informed about political events going on back home.

When Otto was elected King of Greece in 1832, she urged her husband to consult and listen to Otto on the matter. Further, she warned Ludwig I about the scholar Friedrich Thiersch whom she considered too liberal, and the painter Karl Wilhelm von Heydeck, whom she considered unpopular in Greece. There are many political letters written from the Queen to Ludwig I stored in the house archives of the Wittelsbachs, the content of which has yet to be evaluated.

=== Charity and social work ===
On the anniversary of the Battle of the Leipzig in 1814, Therese von Saxen-Hildburghausen organized a feeding for the poor and thereby became a patron of the Salzburg Women's Association. In 1827, Therese founded Theresienorden, a distinguished order for women of Bavaria whose aim was to provide for the poor.

She was also heavily involved in the Women's Association for Day Nurseries and was quite close with one of the founders, Auguste Escherisch. She described her as a simple woman of the people. Therese had to obtain the King's permission to interact with her, and during a visit to Auguste Escherisch's house, the Queen confessed to having never seen a kitchen before and was consequently instructed on how to use pots and pans.

== Children ==
Therese and Ludwig had nine children:

- Maximilian (1811–1864), who married Princess Marie of Prussia (1825–1889); King of Bavaria as Maximilian II from 1848 to 1864.
- Mathilde Caroline (1813–1862), who married Ludwig III, Grand Duke of Hesse and by Rhine (1806–1877).
- Otto (1815–1867), who married Duchess Amalie of Oldenburg (1818–1875); King of Greece as Otto I from 1832 to 1862.
- Theodelinde (1816–1817).
- Luitpold (1821–1912), who married Archduchess Auguste of Austria (1825–1864); Prince Regent of Bavaria (1886–1912).
- Adelgunde (1823–1914), who married Francis V, Duke of Modena (1819–1875).
- Hildegard (1825–1864), who married Archduke Albert of Austria (1817–1895) Duke of Teschen.
- Alexandra (1826–1875).
- Adalbert (1828–1875), who married Infanta Amalia of Spain (1834–1905).

== Honours ==
Kingdom of Bavaria : Sovereign of the Order of Saint Elizabeth

== Ancestry ==
Therese was related to Queen Victoria from the House of Saxe-Coburg and Gotha, later becoming the House of Windsor in Britain. Therese's maternal grandfather was Charles II of Mecklenburg-Strelitz; his sister became Queen Charlotte of the United Kingdom, wife of King George III. Charlotte would eventually become the grandmother of Queen Victoria.

=== Further ancestry ===
Ancestors of Therese of Saxe-Hildburghausen

8. Ernst Frederick II, Duke of Saxe-Hildburghausen
4. Ernest Frederick III, Duke of Saxe-Hildburghausen
9. Countess Caroline of Erbach-Fürstenau
2. Frederick, Duke of Saxe-Altenburg
10. Ernest Augustus I, Duke of Saxe-Weimar-Eisenach
5. Princess Ernestine of Saxe-Weimar-Eisenach
11. Princess Sophie Charlotte of Brandenburg-Bayreuth
1. Therese of Saxe-Hildburghausen
12. Duke Charles Louis Frederick of Mecklenburg-Strelitz
6. Charles II, Grand Duke of Mecklenburg-Strelitz
13. Princess Elisabeth Albertine of Saxe-Hildburghausen
3. Duchess Charlotte Georgine of Mecklenburg-Strelitz
14. Prince George William of Hesse-Darmstadt
7. Princess Friederike of Hesse-Darmstadt
15. Countess Maria Louise Albertine of Leiningen-Dagsburg-Falkenburg

Therese of Saxe-Hildburghausen House of Saxe-Hildburghausen Cadet branch of the House of Wettin Born: 8 July 1792 Died: 26 October 1854
German royalty
Preceded by Caroline of Baden	Queen consort of Bavaria; 13 October 1825 – 20 March 1848	Succeeded by Marie of Prussia
