= Prince Adalbert of Bavaria (1828–1875) =

Bavarian prince (1828–1875)

Prince Adalbert
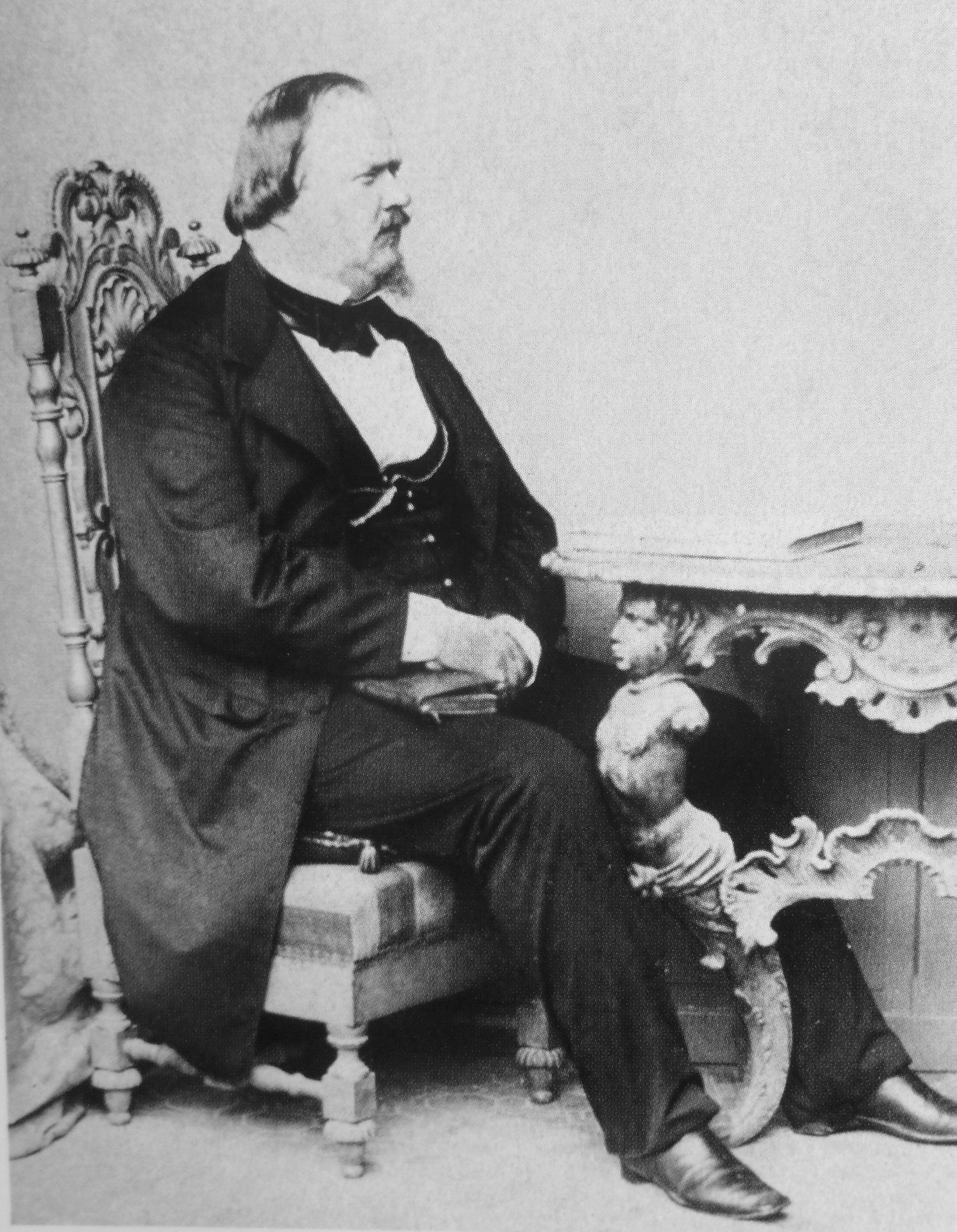
- Born: 19 July 1828; Munich, Kingdom of Bavaria
- Died: 21 September 1875 (aged 47); Munich, Kingdom of Bavaria, German Empire
- Burial: Michaelskirche, Munich
- Spouse: Infanta Amalia of Spain (m. 1856)
- Issue: Prince Ludwig Ferdinand; Prince Alfons; Isabella, Duchess of Genoa; Princess Elvira; Princess Clara
Names
- German: Adalbert Wilhelm Georg Ludwig; English: Adalbert William George Louis
- House: Wittelsbach
- Father: Ludwig I of Bavaria
- Mother: Therese of Saxe-Hildburghausen

Prince Adalbert (Adalbert Wilhelm George Louis; Munich, 19 July 1828 – Nymphenburg Palace, 21 September 1875) was the ninth child and fourth son of Ludwig I of Bavaria and Therese of Saxe-Hildburghausen.

== Marriage ==
In Madrid on 25 August 1856, he married Infanta Amalia of Spain (1834–1905), sister of King Consort Francis, Duke of Cádiz, and sixth daughter and eleventh child of Infante Francisco de Paula of Spain (a younger son of King Charles IV of Spain) and Princess Luisa Carlotta of Bourbon-Two Sicilies. They had five children:

- Prince Ludwig Ferdinand of Bavaria (22 October 1859 – 23 November 1949); married Infanta María de la Paz of Spain.
- Prince Alfons of Bavaria (24 January 1862 – 8 January 1933); married Princess Louise of Orléans, daughter of Prince Ferdinand, Duke of Alençon.
- Princess Isabella of Bavaria (31 August 1863 – 26 February 1924); married Prince Thomas, Duke of Genoa.
- Princess Elvira of Bavaria (22 November 1865 – 1 April 1943); married Count Rudolf von Wrbna-Kaunitz-Rietberg-Questenberg und Freudenthal.
- Princess Clara of Bavaria (11 October 1867 – 29 May 1941); unmarried, 1109th Dame of the Order of Queen Maria Luisa.

== Death ==
Prince Adalbert of Bavaria died on 21 September 1875 (the same day as his sister Alexandra) in Munich and is buried in the crypt of Michaelskirche in Munich, Bavaria.

== Greek succession ==
It is often suggested that following his older brother Otto's death, Prince Adalbert became the heir presumptive to the throne of Greece. In fact, rights to the Greek succession were passed onto his other older brother Luitpold, who technically succeeded to the Greek throne in 1867. Due to the renunciation of all the rights to the Greek succession by King Ludwig III, at Luitpold's death the rights to the throne of Greece were inherited by his second son, Prince Leopold.

However, if it is proven that all legitimate descendants of Luitpold (barring those through King Ludwig III) are indeed extinct (discounting also the male descendants of Prince Georg of Bavaria), Adalbert's male-line descendants could conceivably assume the claim to the throne of Greece.

== Honours ==
He received the following orders and decorations:

- Kingdom of Bavaria:
  - Knight of St. Hubert
  - Grand Prior of Franconia of the Royal Bavarian House Equestrian Order of St. George
- Austrian Empire: Grand Cross of St. Stephen, 1858
- Baden:
  - Knight of the House Order of Fidelity, 1854
  - Grand Cross of the Zähringer Lion, 1854
- (Saxe-Coburg and Gotha) (Duchy of Saxe-Altenburg) (Saxe-Meiningen) Ernestine duchies: Grand Cross of the Saxe-Ernestine House Order, November 1853
- Kingdom of Greece: Grand Cross of the Redeemer
- Electorate of Hesse: Grand Cross of the Golden Lion, 10 June 1851
- Grand Duchy of Hesse: Grand Cross of the Ludwig Order, 4 October 1848
- Oldenburg: Grand Cross of the Order of Duke Peter Friedrich Ludwig, with Golden Crown, 4 November 1862
- Ottoman Empire: Order of the Medjidie, 1st Class
- Kingdom of Prussia:
  - Knight of the Black Eagle, 23 August 1845
  - Knight of the Red Eagle, 1st Class
- Kingdom of Saxony: Knight of the Rue Crown
- Spain:
  - Grand Cross of the Order of Charles III, 2 March 1852
  - Knight of the Golden Fleece, 18 August 1856

== Ancestry ==
Ancestors of Prince Adalbert of Bavaria (1828–1875)

8. Frederick Michael, Count Palatine of Zweibrücken
4. Maximilian I Joseph of Bavaria
9. Countess Palatine Maria Franziska of Sulzbach
2. Ludwig I of Bavaria
10. Prince George William of Hesse-Darmstadt
5. Princess Augusta Wilhelmine of Hesse-Darmstadt
11. Countess Maria Louise Albertine of Leiningen-Dagsburg-Falkenburg
1. Prince Adalbert of Bavaria
12. Ernest Frederick III, Duke of Saxe-Hildburghausen
6. Frederick, Duke of Saxe-Altenburg
13. Princess Ernestine of Saxe-Weimar-Eisenach
3. Princess Therese of Saxe-Hildburghausen
14. Charles II, Grand Duke of Mecklenburg-Strelitz
7. Duchess Charlotte Georgine of Mecklenburg-Strelitz
15. Princess Friederike of Hesse-Darmstadt

== Literature ==
- Die Wittelsbacher. Geschichte unserer Familie. Prestel Verlag, München, 1979
