= Archduchess Gisela of Austria =

Austrian princess, daughter of Franz Joseph I

- Princess Leopold of Bavaria
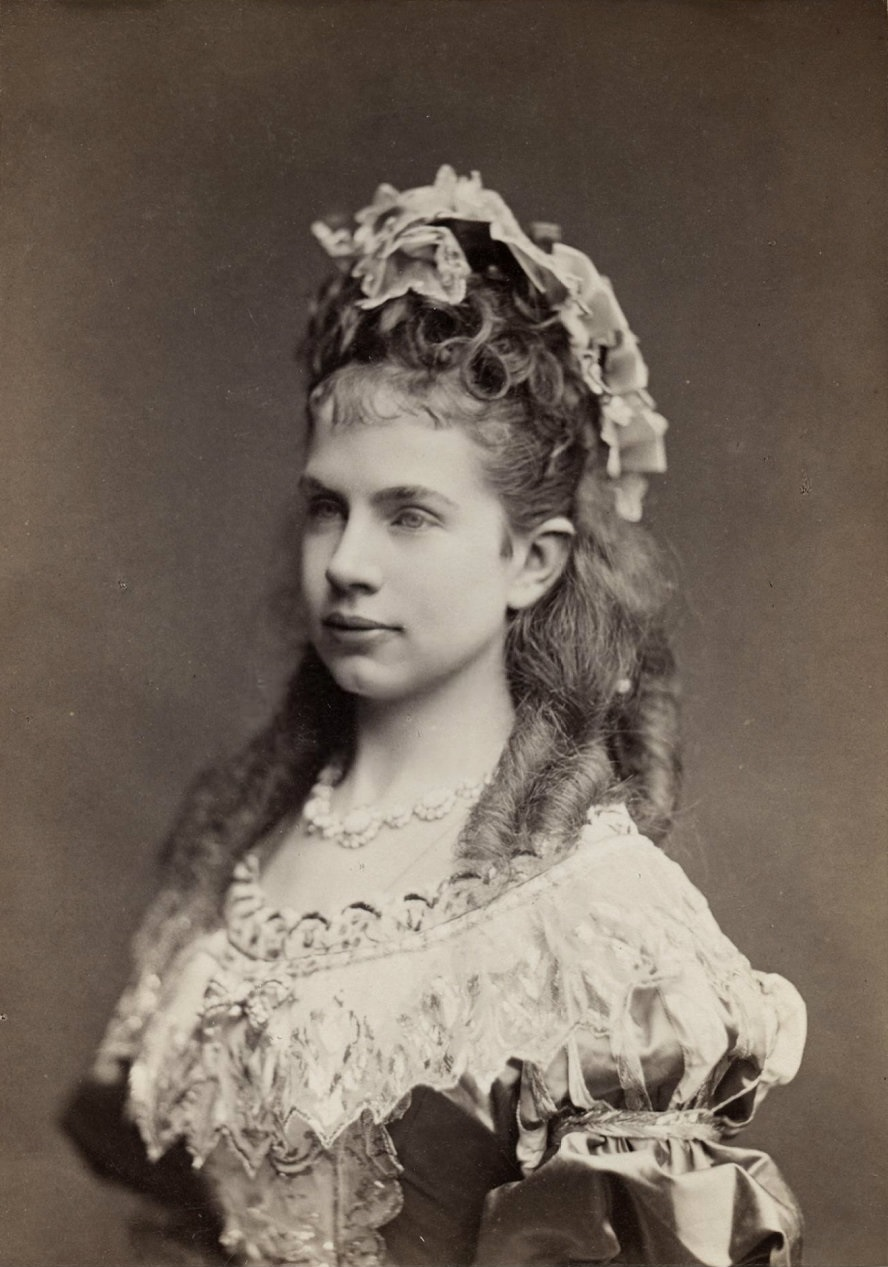
- Portrait by Rudolf Krziwanek
- Born: 12 July 1856; Laxenburg, Austrian Empire
- Died: 27 July 1932 (aged 76); Munich, Bavaria, Weimar Republic
- Burial: St. Michael's Church, Munich
- Spouse: Prince Leopold of Bavaria (m. 1873; died 1930)
- Issue: Elisabeth Marie, Countess of Seefried and Buttenheim; Auguste, Archduchess of Austria; Prince Georg; Prince Konrad
- House: Habsburg-Lorraine
- Father: Franz Joseph I of Austria
- Mother: Elisabeth of Bavaria

Archduchess Gisela Louise Marie of Austria (12 July 1856 – 27 July 1932) was the second daughter and eldest surviving child of Emperor Franz Joseph I and Empress Elisabeth of Austria. She became a Princess of Bavaria through her marriage to her second cousin, Leopold.

== Early life ==
Archduchess Gisela was born on 12 July 1856. The second child of Franz Joseph I of Austria and Elisabeth in Bavaria, she was named Gisella Louise Marie; the name Gisella was given in honor of Queen Gisela of Hungary, wife of Stephen I, the first Christian Hungarian king. Although christened Gisella, she only ever wrote her name with one L.

Like her elder sister Archduchess Sophie and her brother Crown Prince Rudolf, Gisela was raised by her paternal grandmother, Archduchess Sophie of Austria. Of a sober nature like her father, she kept a reserved attitude towards her mother. She had a very close relationship with her brother, whose suicide affected her greatly. Her father collected some of the family's personal items, such as the first pair of shoes worn by each of his children. Among these keepsakes was a poem written for him by a young Gisela one Christmas; the poem was said to be the most treasured item among this collection. Archduchess Gisela was also known to paint in her later years.

== Marriage and family ==
On 20 April 1873, at the age of 16, Gisela was married to Prince Leopold of Bavaria in Vienna. Prince Leopold was a son of Prince Regent Luitpold of Bavaria and Auguste Ferdinande of Austria: Gisela's second cousin. Leopold had initially fallen for Princess Amalie of Saxe-Coburg and Gotha, whom Empress Elisabeth's younger brother Duke Maximilian Emanuel in Bavaria intended to marry. The Empress therefore arranged an encounter of Leopold and Gisela at Gödöllő Palace, and the prince knew he could not refuse her offer.

According to a letter to his mother written in 1872, Emperor Franz Josef wanted the match between his daughter and the Wittelsbach prince, as there were so few Catholic princes available at that time. It seems he felt he had to secure the only viable candidate to whom he could give Gisela (whom he called "our darling girl" during the wedding rites) with confidence. Prince Leopold received the immense dowry of a half a million guilders and soon overcame his former infatuation with Princess Amalie.

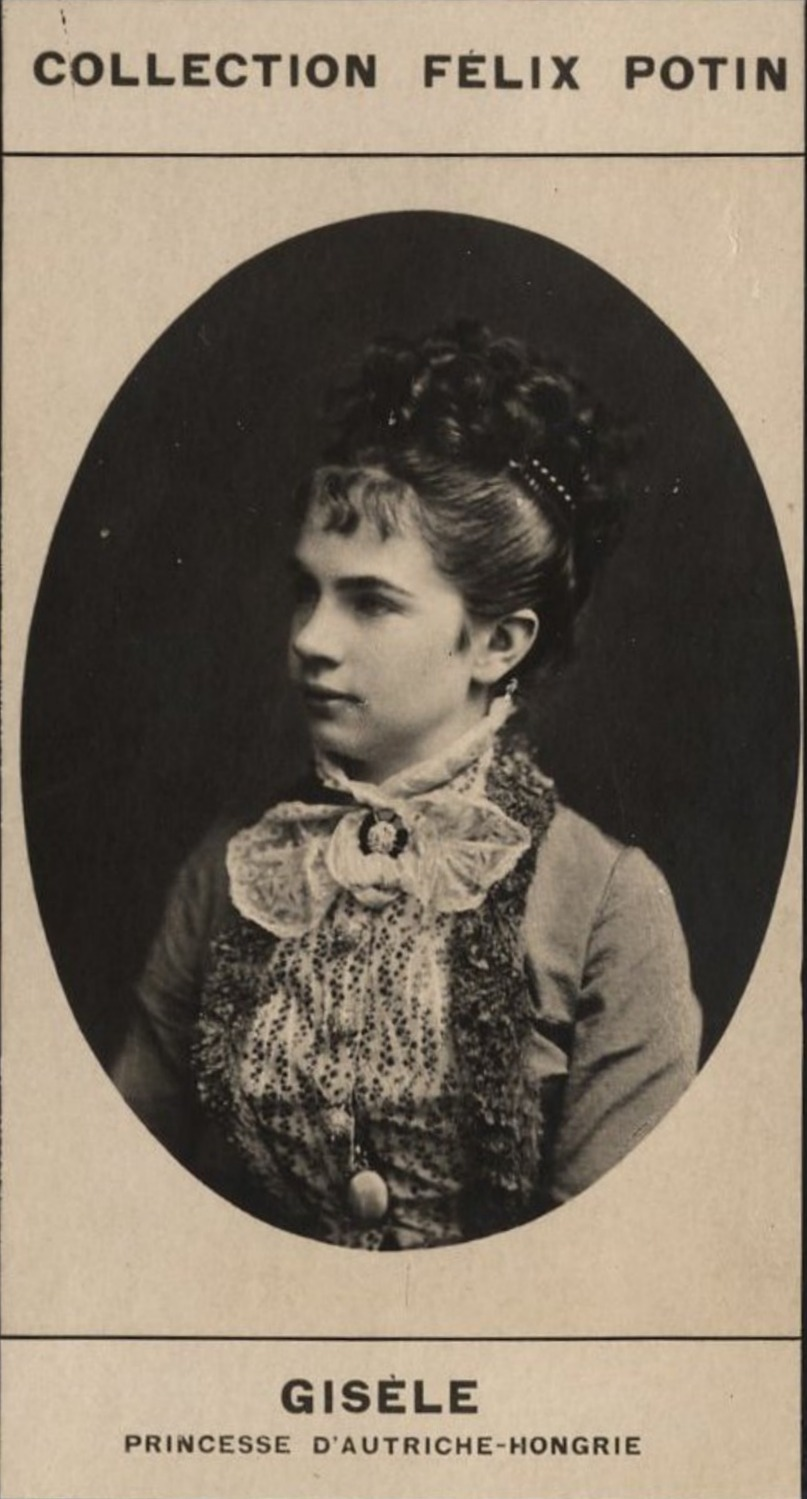
Gisela in c. 1900

Gisela's mother remained absent during the wedding celebrations. The young couple was made welcome in Munich by her husband's family and went on to live in the Palais Leopold residence in Schwabing. The Palais was renamed Giselastraße in her honor in 1873.

=== Children ===
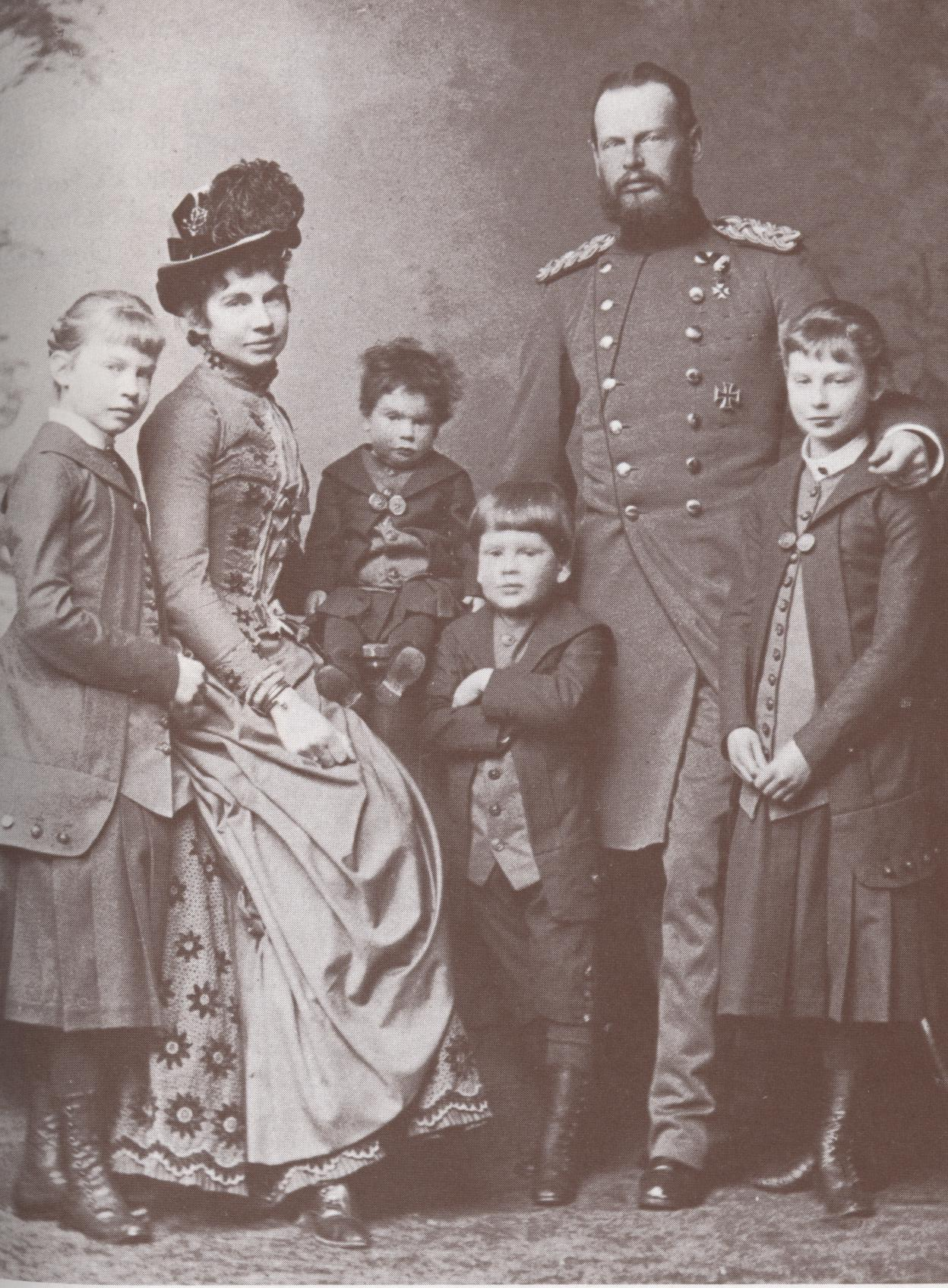
Gisela and Leopold with their children, about 1885.

A year after her wedding, she gave birth to her first child and Empress Elisabeth attended the baptism. Gisela and Leopold had four children:

- Princess Elisabeth Marie of Bavaria (8 January 1874 – 4 March 1957), who married Count Otto Ludwig Philipp von Seefried auf Buttenheim. They had five children.
  - Countess Gisela von Seefried auf Buttenheim (1895–1895), who died as a baby.
  - Countess Elisabeth von Seefried auf Buttenheim (1897–1975)
  - Countess Auguste von Seefried auf Buttenheim (1899–1978), who married Prince Adalbert of Bavaria in 1919.
  - Countess Marie Valerie von Seefried auf Buttenheim (1901–1972), who married Rudolph-Karl Baron von Stengal in 1923. They divorced and she married Wilhelm Otto von Riedemann, grandson of Wilhelm Anton von Riedemann, in 1935.
  - Count Franz Joseph von Seefried auf Buttenheim, Freiherr zu Hagenbach (1904–1969), who married Gabrielle von Schnitzler, only daughter of Georg August Eduard von Schnitzler and Lilly Bertha Dorothea von Mallinckrodt, in 1941.
- Princess Auguste Maria of Bavaria (28 April 1875 – 25 June 1964), who married Joseph August, Archduke of Austria.The couple had six children;
  - Archduke Joseph Francis of Austria, born on 28 March 1895; died on 25 September 1957 (aged 62)
  - Archduchess Gisela Auguste Anna Maria, born on 5 July 1897; died on 30 March 1901 (aged 3)
  - Archduchess Sophie Klementine Elisabeth Klothilde Maria, born on 11 March 1899; died on 19 April 1978 (aged 79)
  - Archduke Ladislaus Luitpold, born on 3 January 1901; died on 29 August 1946 (aged 44)
  - Archduke Matthias Joseph Albrecht Anton Ignatius, born on 26 June 1904; died on 7 October 1905 (aged 1)
  - Archduchess Magdalena Maria Raineria, born on 6 September 1909; died on 11 May 2000 (aged 90)
- Prince Georg of Bavaria (2 April 1880 – 31 May 1943), who married Archduchess Isabella of Austria. Without issue
- Prince Konrad of Bavaria (22 November 1883 – 6 September 1969), who married Princess Bona Margherita of Savoy-Genoa.The couple had two children:
  - Princess Amalie Isabella of Bavaria (15 December 1921 in Munich – 28 March 1985 in Milan), married on 25 August 1949 in Lugano, Count Umberto Poletti-Galimberta, Count of Assandri (21 June 1921 in Milan – 18 February 1995 in Milan), son of Luciano Poletti and Adriana Galimberti. They have issue.
  - Prince Eugen of Bavaria (16 July 1925 in Munich – 1 January 1997 in Grasse), married Countess Helene of Khevenhüller-Metsch (4 April 1921 in Vienna – 25 December 2017 in Bad Hindelang), daughter of Count Franz of Khevenhüller-Metsch and Princess Anna of Fürstenberg. They have no issue.

== Charity works and World War I ==
Especially after the death of her brother, Gisela was deeply involved in a variety of social and political issues. She founded charities to support the poor, blind, and deaf people, taking an active role in the running of these charities. During World War I she ran a military hospital in her Palais while her husband was a field marshal on the eastern front. When the Revolution broke out in 1918, the rest of her family fled the city, but Gisela remained and took part in the 1919 elections for the Weimar National Assembly where women above the age of 20 were allowed to vote for the first time.

She was held in such high esteem that Gisela was commonly called the Good Angel from Vienna, known for her patronage of a number of institutions, including the Giselabahn (a train running from Salzburg to Tirol), the still active paddle steamer Gisela on the Traunsee, and the Gisela Gymnasium in Munich.

== Widowhood and death ==
Gisela and her husband celebrated their golden wedding anniversary in 1923. Her husband died in 1930; Gisela only survived him by two years. She died aged 76 in Munich on 27 July 1932, and is buried next to Prince Leopold in the Colombarium at the St.Michaelskirche, Munich.

== Honours ==
She received the following orders:

- Austria-Hungary:
  - Dame of the Order of the Starry Cross
  - Grand Cross of the Order of Elizabeth, 1898
- Kingdom of Bavaria:
  - Dame of the Order of Theresa
  - Dame of the Order of Saint Elizabeth
- Kingdom of Portugal: Dame of the Order of Saint Isabel
- Spain: 601st Dame of the Order of Queen Maria Luisa, 29 January 1863

== Ancestry ==
Ancestors of Archduchess Gisela of Austria

8. Francis II, Holy Roman Emperor
4. Archduke Franz Karl of Austria
9. Princess Maria Theresa of Naples and Sicily
2. Franz Joseph I of Austria
10. Maximilian I Joseph of Bavaria
5. Princess Sophie of Bavaria
11. Princess Caroline of Baden
1. Archduchess Gisela of Austria
12. Duke Pius August in Bavaria
6. Duke Maximilian Joseph in Bavaria
13. Princess Amélie Louise of Arenberg
3. Duchess Elisabeth in Bavaria
14. Maximilian I Joseph of Bavaria (= 10)
7. Princess Ludovika of Bavaria
15. Princess Caroline of Baden (= 11)
