= Princess Elisabeth Marie of Bavaria =

Princess Elisabeth Marie
- Countess Otto of Seefried and Buttenheim
- Elisabeth Marie in 1908
- Born: 8 January 1874; Munich, Kingdom of Bavaria, German Empire
- Died: 4 March 1957 (aged 83); Castle Stiebar, Gresten, Austria
- Burial: Gresten, Austria
- Spouse: Count Otto of Seefried and Buttenheim (m. 1893; died 1951)
- Issue: Countess Gisele; Countess Elisabeth; Auguste, Princess Adalbert of Bavaria; Countess Valerie; Count Franz Joseph
Names
- Elisabeth Marie Auguste; German: Elisabeth Marie Auguste Prinzessin von Bayern
- House: Wittelsbach
- Father: Prince Leopold of Bavaria
- Mother: Archduchess Gisela of Austria

Princess Elisabeth Marie of Bavaria (German: Elisabeth Marie Auguste Prinzessin von Bayern; 8 January 1874 – 4 March 1957) was a member of the Bavarian Royal House of Wittelsbach.

== Early life ==
Elisabeth was born in Munich, Bavaria, on 8 January 1874, as a member of the House of Wittelsbach, reigning family of the Kingdom of Bavaria. She was first child of Prince Leopold of Bavaria and Archduchess Gisela of Austria. She had one younger sister, Princess Auguste Maria of Bavaria, and two younger brothers, Prince Georg and Prince Konrad of Bavaria.

Her paternal grandparents were Luitpold, Prince Regent of Bavaria, the de facto ruler of Bavaria from 1886 to 1912, as regent for his nephews, King Ludwig II and King Otto, and Archduchess Auguste Ferdinande of Austria. Her maternal grandparents were Austrian Emperor Franz Joseph I and Empress Elisabeth of Austria.

== Personal life ==
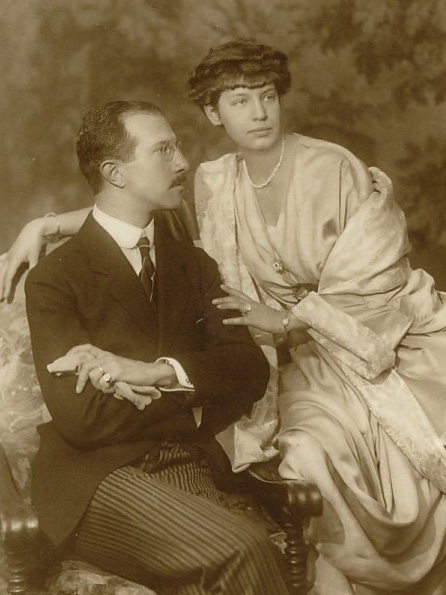
Countess Auguste von Seefried with her husband, Prince Adalbert of Bavaria

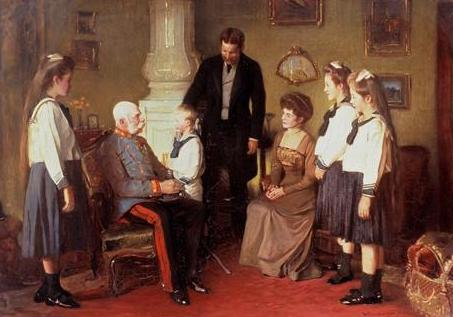
Painting showing Emperor Franz Joseph I visiting his granddaughter Princess Elisabeth Marie and her family.

On 2 November 1893 at Genoa, Italy, she married Otto Ludwig Philipp von Seefried auf Buttenheim, Freiherr zu Hagenbach (1870–1951), the only son of Ludwig von Seefried auf Buttenheim, Freiherr von Hagenbach (1846–1902) and Emilie von Schmaltz (1849–1921). Elisabeth and Otto eloped and married secretly, as they knew they would never be officially permitted to marry. Not only was Otto of much lower rank than Elisabeth, he was also a Protestant. In a letter announcing the marriage to his new parents-in-law, Otto stated that he and Elisabeth were so determined not to be parted that they had felt forced to choose between elopement and a mutual suicide.

Elisabeth's father, and especially her paternal grandfather, Luitpold, Prince Regent of Bavaria, were incensed upon being presented with this fait accompli. It took years for Elisabeth's relationship with her father to recover; their reconciliation was mostly due to the efforts of her mother, Gisela, and maternal grandfather, Emperor Franz Joseph. Both of the latter gave the couple their blessing after the marriage was announced, and Franz Joseph presented them with a palace near Vienna. He also appointed Otto a lieutenant of the 1st Regiment of Infantry at Troppau and raised him to the rank of Count in 1904. At the time of the elopement, Franz Joseph had written to his wife that while he was not happy about the marriage, he felt that Elisabeth had shown courage and strength of character.

The marriage proved to be a very happy one, and the couple had five children; the first, Gisela, died as a baby. In 1908, Count Seefried auf Buttenheim inherited Castle Buttenheim in Gresten, Lower Austria, which has remained the family seat to the present day.

=== Issue ===
- Countess Gisela von Seefried auf Buttenheim (4 January 1895 – 19 January 1895), who died as a baby.
- Countess Elisabeth von Seefried auf Buttenheim (10 June 1897 – 4 June 1975)
- Countess Auguste von Seefried auf Buttenheim (20 June 1899 – 21 January 1978), who married Prince Adalbert of Bavaria in 1919. Auguste and Adalbert are the parents of Konstantin Prinz von Bayern.
- Countess Marie Valerie von Seefried auf Buttenheim (1901–1972), who married Rudolph-Karl Baron von Stengal in 1923. They divorced and she married Wilhelm Otto von Riedemann, grandson of Wilhelm Anton von Riedemann, in 1935.
- Count Franz Joseph von Seefried auf Buttenheim, Freiherr zu Hagenbach (1904–1969), who married Gabrielle von Schnitzler, only daughter of Georg August Eduard von Schnitzler and Lilly Bertha Dorothea von Mallinckrodt, in 1941.

Her husband died on 5 September 1951 at Stiebar Palace in Gresten. Princess Elisabeth died aged 83 on 4 March 1957, and was buried at the cemetery in Gresten, Austria.

=== Descendants ===
Through her youngest son, she was the grandmother of Franz (b. 1942), who married Ruth Margaretha Schlumpf; Ferdinand (b. 1944), who married Monique Brouillet (b. 1950); Isabel (b. 1949), who married Count Martin Edmont Walter Karl Hoyos von Stichsenstein; and Johannes (b. 1959), who is unmarried.

== Ancestry ==
Ancestors of Princess Elisabeth Marie of Bavaria

16. Maximilian I Joseph of Bavaria
8. Ludwig I of Bavaria
17. Princess Augusta Wilhelmine of Hesse-Darmstadt
4. Luitpold, Prince Regent of Bavaria
18. Frederick, Duke of Saxe-Altenburg
9. Princess Therese of Saxe-Hildburghausen
19. Duchess Charlotte Georgine of Mecklenburg-Strelitz
2. Prince Leopold of Bavaria
20. Ferdinand III, Grand Duke of Tuscany
10. Leopold II, Grand Duke of Tuscany
21. Princess Luisa of Naples and Sicily
5. Archduchess Auguste Ferdinande of Austria
22. Maximilian, Hereditary Prince of Saxony
11. Princess Maria Anna of Saxony
23. Princess Carolina of Parma
1. Princess Elisabeth Marie of Bavaria
24. Francis II, Holy Roman Emperor
12. Archduke Franz Karl of Austria
25. Princess Maria Theresa of Naples and Sicily
6. Francis Joseph I of Austria
26. Maximilian I Joseph of Bavaria (= 16)
13. Princess Sophie of Bavaria
27. Princess Caroline of Baden
3. Archduchess Gisela of Austria
28. Duke Pius August in Bavaria
14. Duke Maximilian Joseph in Bavaria
29. Princess Amélie Louise of Arenberg
7. Duchess Elisabeth in Bavaria
30. Maximilian I Joseph of Bavaria (= 16, 26)
15. Princess Ludovika of Bavaria
31. Princess Caroline of Baden (= 27)
