= Gerd Uecker =

German opera manager (1946–2024)

- Gerd Uecker, c. 2011
- Born: 15 September 1946; Munich
- Died: 17 January 2024 (aged 77)
- Occupation: Artistic director
- Organizations: Bavarian State Opera · Semperoper

Gerd Uecker (15 September 1946 – 17 January 2024) was a German music teacher and a music and opera manager. From 1993 to 2000 he was artistic director of the Bavarian State Opera in Munich, and from 2003 to 2010 he directed in the same position the Semperoper in Dresden.

== Life and career ==
Uecker was born in Munich on 15 September 1946, the son of a physician. After his Abitur at the Gisela Gymnasium in 1964 he studied piano, music education and conducting at the Hochschule für Musik und Theater München. At the beginning of his career, Uecker worked as a solo repetiteur at the Cologne Opera from 1969, where he met the director Jean-Pierre Ponnelle. In 1970 he received a teaching assignment for opera at the Rheinisches Musikkonservatorium in Cologne for musical theatre. In 1973 Uecker was appointed music director and head of the opera department of the Südostbayerischen Städtetheater in Passau.

In 1979 Uecker came to the Bavarian State Opera in Munich, where he held the position of a director if the department of music. In 1988 he became artistic director, and from September 1993 opera director, responsible for the management of the opera house in the Bavarian capital. He served to 2000.

In January 2000, Uecker was given the task by the Minister of State for Science and the Arts in Saxony, Hans Joachim Meyer, of managing the Semperoper from the 2003/04 season. He managed the house in a period of recovery after flood damage in 2002. He had counted on Giuseppe Sinopoli becoming musical director in 2003 and Herbert Wernicke active as director and stage designer, but both died unexpectedly before his tenure began. His focus was on the works by Richard Strauss who had enjoyed several world premieres there and other works related to Dresden, including Hasse's Cleofide, Weber's Euryanthe, Schoeck's Penthesilea and Hindemith's Cardillac. He programmed contemporary works such as Henze's L'Upupa and Heggie's Dead Man Walking, promoted productions of new operas, and opened possibilities for young singers.

From 2005 Uecker was chairman of the German-speaking Opera Conference, succeeding Sir Peter Jonas, the artistic director of the Bavarian State Opera, and holding the position to 2010. He was chairman of the University Council of the Musikhochschule Lübeck from 2007.

Uecker taught in Venice, Beijing and Stuttgart and was honorary professor at the Hochschule für Musik und Theater München and at the Bayerische Theaterakademie August Everding. He was also a guest lecturer at the European Academy for Music and Performing Arts in Montepulciano and at the Dresden Academy of Music, among others. From 2011 he was Honorary Chairman of the Bundeswettbewerb Gesang Berlin.

Uecker died on 17 January 2024, at the age of 77.

== Publications ==
- Traumberuf Opernsänger: Von der Ausbildung zum Engagement, Leipzig, 2012, ISBN 978-3-89487-746-0
