= Princess Amalie Isabella of Bavaria =

German royal (1921–1985)

Princess Amalie
- Mrs. Umberto Poletti
- Born: 15 December 1921
- Died: 28 March 1985 (aged 63)
- Spouse: Umberto Poletti (m. 1949)
- Issue: Carlo Poletti Galimberti, Count di Assandri di Baviera
- House: Wittelsbach
- Father: Prince Konrad of Bavaria
- Mother: Princess Maria Bona of Savoy-Genoa

Princess Amalie Isabella of Bavaria (German: Amalie Isabella Marie Gisela Margarete Prinzessin von Bayern; 15 December 1921 – 28 March 1985) was a member of the Bavarian Royal House of Wittelsbach.

== Biography ==
Princess Amalie Isabella of Bavaria was born to Prince Konrad of Bavaria and Princess Bona Margherita of Savoy-Genoa on 15 December 1921. Amalie Isabella was the older sister of Prince Eugen of Bavaria.

On 25 August 1949, in the city of Lugano, Switzerland, Amalie Isabella married Count Umberto Poletti Galimberti, Count di Assandri (21 June 1921 in Milan – 18 February 1995 in Milan). He was the son of Luciano Poletti and Adriana Galimberti. Together Amalie Isabella and Poletti had one child a son:

- Carlo Tomasso Guillermo Poletti Galimberti, Count di Assandri di Bavieria, married on 14 April 1988 in Milan, Nobile Loredana Biffi (born 1957). They have two children.

== Ancestry ==
Ancestors of Princess Amalie Isabella of Bavaria

16. Ludwig I of Bavaria
8. Luitpold, Prince Regent of Bavaria
17. Princess Therese of Saxe-Hildburghausen
4. Prince Leopold of Bavaria
18. Leopold II, Grand Duke of Tuscany
9. Archduchess Auguste Ferdinande of Austria
19. Princess Maria Anna of Saxony
2. Prince Konrad of Bavaria
20. Archduke Franz Karl of Austria
10. Franz Joseph I of Austria
21. Princess Sophie of Bavaria
5. Archduchess Gisela of Austria
22. Duke Maximilian Joseph in Bavaria
11. Duchess Elisabeth in Bavaria
23. Princess Ludovika of Bavaria
1. Princess Amalie Isabella of Bavaria
24. Charles Albert of Sardinia
12. Prince Ferdinando, Duke of Genoa
25. Archduchess Maria Theresa of Austria
6. Prince Tommaso, Duke of Genoa
26. John of Saxony
13. Princess Elisabeth of Saxony
27. Princess Amalie Auguste of Bavaria
3. Princess Maria Bona of Savoy-Genoa
28. Ludwig I of Bavaria (= 16)
14. Prince Adalbert of Bavaria
29. Princess Therese of Saxe-Hildburghausen (= 17)
7. Princess Isabella of Bavaria
30. Infante Francisco de Paula of Spain
15. Infanta Amalia of Spain
31. Princess Luisa Carlotta of the Two Sicilies
