= Franz Joseph von Seefried =

German noble (1904–1969)

- Count of Seefried
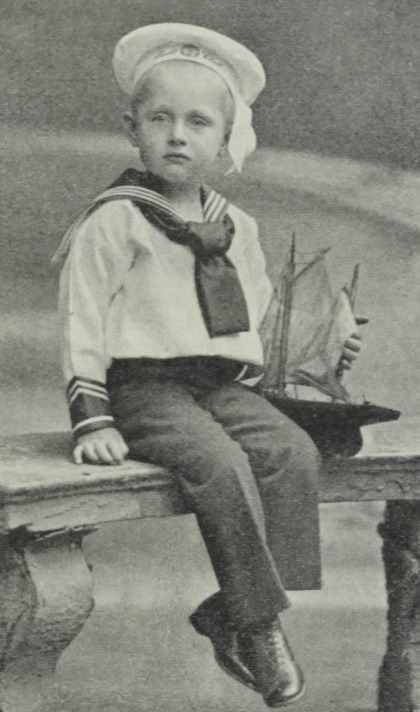
- Franz Joseph, 1907-1912
- Born: 29 July 1904; Ružomberok, Kingdom of Hungary, Austria-Hungary
- Died: 15 May 1969 (aged 64); Madrid, Spanish State
- Spouse: Gabrielle von Schnitzler (m. 1941)
- Issue: Francisco José von Seefried; Fernando von Seefried; Isabel von Seefried; Johannes von Seefried
- Father: Count Otto von Seefried auf Buttenheim
- Mother: Princess Elisabeth Marie of Bavaria

Franz-Joseph Graf von Seefried auf Buttenheim Freiherr zu Hagenbach (29 July 1904 – 15 May 1969) was a German nobleman and a naturalist.

== Early life ==
He was born as a youngest child and the only son of Count Otto Ludwig Philipp von Seefried auf Buttenheim, Freiherr zu Hagenbach (1870–1951) and his wife, Princess Elisabeth Marie of Bavaria, granddaughter of Emperor Franz Joseph I of Austria and Empress Elisabeth of Austria. He was known for his work as a naturalist and hunter in Spain, where he served as trade commissioner of Austria.

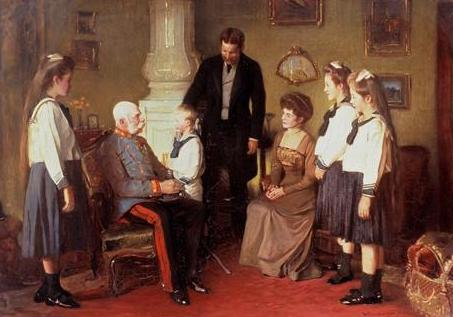
With his namesake great-grandfather, Emperor Franz Joseph I

== Marriage and issue ==
He married Gabrielle von Schnitzler (3 November 1918 – 13 February 2017) on 9 August 1941 in Frankfurt am Main. She was the only daughter of Georg August Eduard von Schnitzler and his wife, Lilly Bertha Dorothea von Mallinckrodt (b. 1888). They had four children:

- Franz, (born 1942, Frankfurt am Main), married to Ruth Margaretha Schlumpf (b. 1963), no issue
- Ferdinand, (born 1944, Madrid, Spain), married to Monique Brouillet (b. 1950), has two daughters and a son
- Isabel, (born 1949, Madrid, Spain), married to Martin Edmont Walter Karl, Count Hoyos zu Stichsenstein (1947–2024), has one daughter and two sons
- Johannes, (born 1959, Wien, Austria), never married.

== Death ==
He died on 15 May 1969 in Madrid as a result of a traffic accident, after crashing against a bus. His funeral was celebrated on 14 June at Church of the Conception.

== Selected works ==
- Seefried, Franz Joseph (1949). Cacerías de Alta Montaña (in Spanish) (1a ed.). Madrid: Ediciones y Publicaciones Españolas. pp. 239 p, [48] p de lam. OCLC 1337340417.
- Seefried, conde de (1952). "Cacerías de Alta Montaña" [High Mountain Hunts]. Conferencias sobre la caza en España, pronunciadas en los locales de la misma [i.e. La Escuela Especial de Ingenieros de Montes] durante el mes de noviembre de 1952 [Lectures on hunting in Spain, given at the premises of the same [i.e. The Special School of Forestry Engineers] during the month of November 1952] (in Spanish). Madrid: Sección de Publicaciones de la Escuela Especial de Ingenieros de Montes, Madrid. LCCN 79387320.
