= Prince Eugen of Bavaria =

German royal (1925–1997)

- Born: 16 July 1925; Munich, Bavaria, Germany
- Died: 1 January 1997 (aged 71); Grasse, Alpes-Maritimes, France
- Burial: Andechs Abbey cemetery, Bavaria, Germany
- Spouse: Countess Helene (Hella) von Khevenhüller-Metsch (m. 1970)
- House: Wittelsbach
- Father: Prince Konrad of Bavaria
- Mother: Princess Maria Bona of Savoy-Genoa

Prince Eugen of Bavaria (German: Eugen Leopold Adelaide Thomas Maria Prinz von Bayern) (16 July 1925 – 1 January 1997) was a member of the Bavarian Royal House of Wittelsbach.

== Early life ==
Prince Eugen was born in Munich and was the only son of Prince Konrad of Bavaria and his wife Princess Maria Bona of Savoy-Genoa. Eugen's older sister was Princess Amalie Isabella of Bavaria, born 1921.

== Marriage ==
On 16 November 1970, Prince Eugen married Countess Helene of Khevenhüller-Metsch (4 April 1921 in Vienna – 25 December 2017 in Bad Hindelang), daughter of Count Franz of Khevenhüller-Metsch and Princess Anna of Fürstenberg. Helene was previously married to Prince Konstantin of Bavaria, who died in a plane crash on 30 July 1969. The civil ceremony took place in Munich and the religious wedding followed five days later in Innsbruck, Austria. The couple did not have any children together, but Helene had a daughter from her previous marriage.

== Later life ==
The prince was a Grand Prior of the Bavarian Order of Saint George, Knight of the Order of Saint Hubert and a Knight of the Sovereign Military Order of Malta.

== Death ==
Prince Eugen of Bavaria died on 1 January 1997 at Grasse in the Alpes-Maritimes region of France. He is buried at the Andechs Abbey cemetery in Bavaria.

== Ancestry ==
Ancestors of Prince Eugen of Bavaria

8. Luitpold, Prince Regent of Bavaria
4. Prince Leopold of Bavaria
9. Archduchess Auguste Ferdinande of Austria
2. Prince Konrad of Bavaria
10. Franz Joseph I of Austria
5. Archduchess Gisela of Austria
11. Duchess Elisabeth in Bavaria
1. Prince Eugen of Bavaria
12. Prince Ferdinando, Duke of Genoa
6. Prince Tommaso, Duke of Genoa
13. Princess Elisabeth of Saxony
3. Princess Maria Bona of Savoy-Genoa
14. Prince Adalbert of Bavaria
7. Princess Isabella of Bavaria
15. Infanta Amalia of Spain
