= Luitpold Gymnasium =

Secondary school in Munich, Germany

Coordinates: 48°08′39″N 11°35′31″E

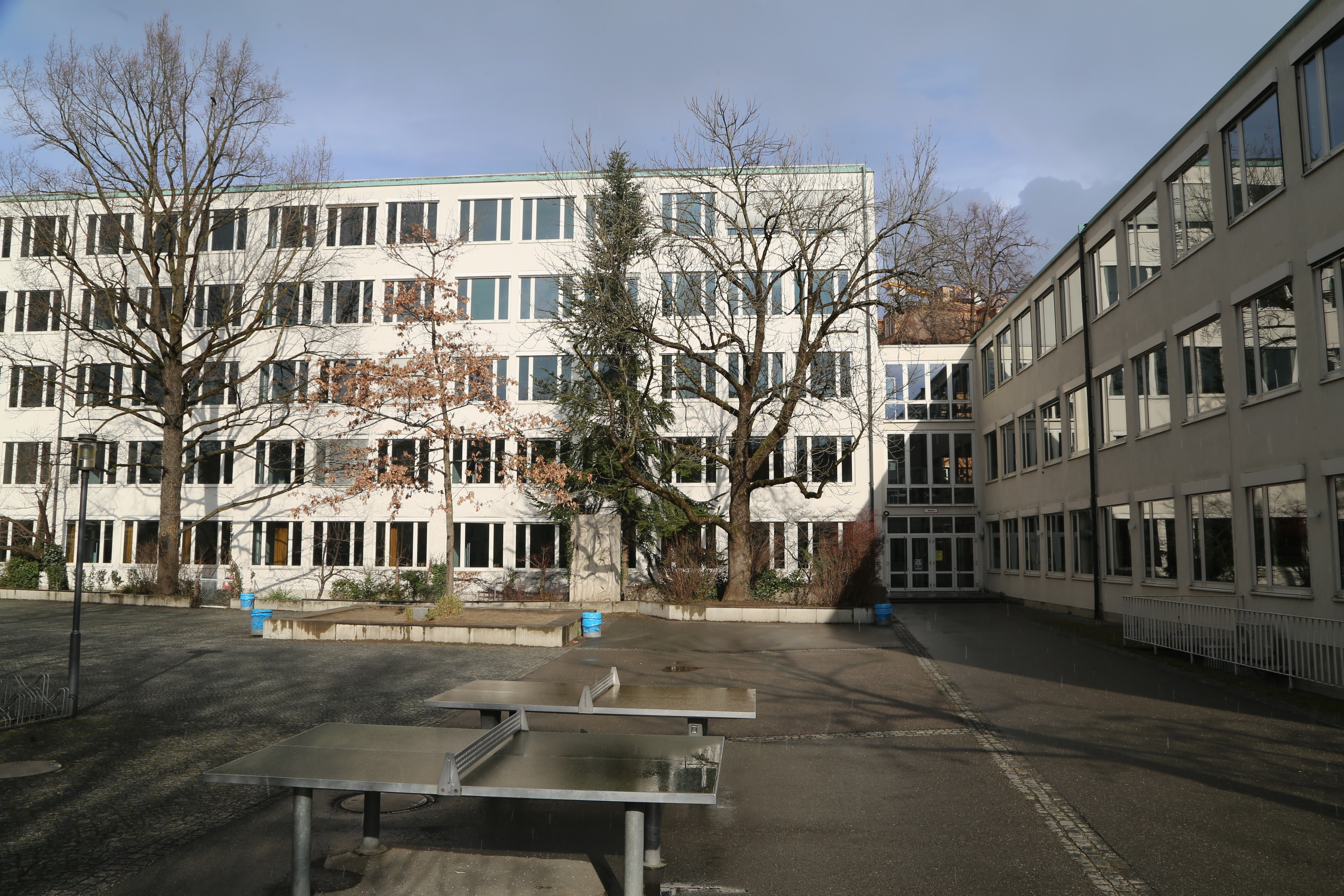
The Luitpold Gymnasium in 2018

The Luitpold-Gymnasium is a secondary school in Munich, Germany. It is located in the Lehel city district, close to Munich's Old Town, and has a long tradition. Established by Prince Luitpold of Bavaria in 1891 as "Luitpold-Kreisrealschule" to serve the eastern part of the city and its suburbs, it originally stood in the Alexandrastrasse opposite the National Museum. The building was completely destroyed by incendiary bombing in 1944, leaving only parts of the outside walls and gymnasium (sports hall). After sharing the facilities of the Wilhelmsgymnasium, the high school was moved to the new building on Seeaustraße 1 in 1958. It introduced the Kollegstufe system in 1975, permitting an individual course of study during the last two years before graduation, and became co-educational in 1983.

The curriculum allows students to choose foreign languages or natural sciences as their main area of study, as well as electives during the Kollegstufe. There are also several student exchange programs that are being offered.

== Notable alumni ==
- Abraham Fraenkel (1891 – 1965), mathematician
- Albert Einstein (1879 – 1955), physicist
- K. Peter C. Vollhardt (* 1946), chemist (Abitur 1965 and elected representative of the pupils of the school)
- Michael Reinhardt (1938 – ), photographer
