= George von Mallinckrodt =

German merchant banker (1930–2021)

- Born: Georg Wilhelm Gustav von Mallinckrodt; 19 August 1930; Wesseling, Rhine, Prussia, Germany
- Died: 16 January 2021 (aged 90)
- Education: Schule Schloss Salem
- Occupation: Merchant banker
- Title: Chairman, Schroders
- Term: 1984-1995
- Successor: Winfried Bischoff
- Spouse: Charmaine Schroder (m. 1958)
- Children: 4
- Relatives: Bruno Schroder (brother-in-law)

Georg Wilhelm Gustav von Mallinckrodt (19 August 1930 – 16 January 2021) was a German merchant banker, whose career at Schroders spanned 54 years, from joining the business as a trainee in 1954, and included 31 years on the Board of Directors and 11 years as executive chairman before retiring in 2008. He died after a long illness on 16 January 2021.

== Early life ==
Von Mallinckrodt was born on 19 August 1930 at Wesseling, Germany to Arnold Wilhelm von Mallinckrodt (1901-1982), member of an old Westphalian noble family, and his wife, Valentine Huberta Alexandra Else Victoria von Joest (1905-1994). He was educated at Schule Schloss Salem near Lake Constance, where Kurt Hahn was a significant presence after the Second World War.

He was the eldest of three children. His father, Arnold, hailed from a family of private bankers in Antwerp and later Frankfurt (Mallinckrodt et Companie) and his mother, Valentine (née von Joest), came from an industrial family in Cologne. The family lived in Paris, where Arnold was Managing Director of Agfa Gevaert. At the outbreak of war, they had to leave Paris suddenly in September 1939 and were interned in Basel before being allowed to return to Germany.

Mallinckrodt attended Salem from 1940. Initially school life was calm but in 1944 the SS took over the running of the school. Things changed radically when the new teaching staff attempted to indoctrinate the pupils. Mallinckrodt rebelled in various ways, was severely punished and, on two occasions, sent to work in munitions factories.

After leaving school, Mallinckrodt did an apprenticeship in precision mechanics with Agfa AG from 1948 to 1951.

== Business career ==
Von Mallinckrodt started his career in trainee roles at a number of merchant banks, including Münchmeyer & Co. in Hamburg in 1951, before moving to Kleinwort Sons & Co. in London in 1953.

In 1954, he joined Schroders as a trainee in the J. Henry Schroder Banking Corporation in New York. Having married into the Schroder family in 1958, he returned to London in 1960 to help drive Schroders’ expansion into Europe. He assisted with the establishment of Schroders’ offices in Frankfurt, Paris and Zurich throughout the 1960s and was appointed to the Board of Directors of Schroders plc in 1977 with responsibility for the United States, Continental Europe and the Middle East. In 1983, he became President and Chief Executive of Schroders in the United States, and in 1984 he was also appointed Executive chairman of Schroders plc, a position he held until 1995. He remained on the Board until his retirement in 2008 and was president of the company from 1995 to 2017.

Outside of his role at Schroders, von Mallinckrodt held directorships in a number of other companies. He was a non-executive director of Siemens Holdings plc between 1989 and 2000 and was an adviser to Bain & Company. He was a founding member of the World Economic Forum and chairman of its council from 1995 to 1997. He was also vice-president of the German-British Chamber of Industry & Commerce, a member of the INSEAD Circle of Patrons, a member of the Dean’s Council at the John F. Kennedy School of Government at Harvard University, and a member of the Chancellor’s Court of Benefactors at Oxford University.

== Civic and charitable activities ==
Von Mallinckrodt was involved with the Institute of Business Ethics as well as being a trustee of Christian Responsibility in Public Affairs (CRPA) and a Christian trustee of the Committee of the Interfaith Foundation.

He was a Trustee of the European Arts Foundation from 1987 to 2002 and a Trustee of the Prague Heritage Fund from 1992 to 2004. He established a number of fellowships and professorships at well-known universities, including the Kennedy School of Government at Harvard, and Washington University in St. Louis, where, together with his wife, he endowed a professorship in plant biology. He also had close connections with INSEAD, where a fellowship in international finance and asset management was funded by Schroders in his name.

He was keenly interested in developing better Anglo-German relations and was an early supporter of the Königswinter Conference. He supported a number of charities connected with the German community in the United Kingdom, including and was president of the German YMCA for over forty years.

Von Mallinckrodt had a strong interest in the natural environment, and was an early member of the World Wildlife Fund (WWF)’s 1001 Nature Trust.

== Arts ==
Von Mallinckrodt developed a close connection with the Bodleian Library and Vatican Library and had a keen interest in incunabula. His ancestor, Bernhard von Mallinckrodt (1591-1664) was an early bibliophile. He was on the National Art Collections Development Fund from 1995 to 2005, the British Museum Development Trust Council, St. George’s College Foundation, Windsor and chaired the German Festival of Arts & Music in London in 1987.

== Personal life ==
In 1958, he married Charmaine Schroder, daughter of Helmut Schroder and the great-great granddaughter of John Henry Schroder, who co-founded the Schroders businesses in 1804. Together they had four children and eleven grandchildren.

Von Mallinckrodt was a keen walker and skier and enjoyed spending time at his family home in Bavaria.

== Honours ==
Von Mallinckrodt was awarded an Honorary KBE in 1997 in recognition of his service to the UK’s banking and finance industry. He was awarded the Grosse Verdienstkreuz in 2001 by the President of the Bundesrepublik of Germany for services to business and philanthropy (following the Verdienstkreuz am Bande in 1986 and Verdienstkreuz 1 Klasse in 1991) and was made a Freeman of the City of London in 2004. Mallinckrodt was awarded the annual Sternberg Interfaith award in 2005 and in 2012 he was granted a Papal Knighthood from the Order of St. Gregory the Great by Pope Benedict XVI.
