= Mallinckrodt (disambiguation) =

Mallinckrodt is an American-Irish pharmaceuticals manufacturer.

Mallinckrodt could also refer to:

- Mallinckrodt (surname)
- Mallinckrodt Institute of Radiology, an academic radiology center within the Washington University School of Medicine in St. Louis, Missouri, U.S.
- Mallinckrodt, Inc. v. Medipart, Inc., a 1992 patent law decision by the United States Court of Appeals for the Federal Circuit
