= Princess Maria Bona of Savoy-Genoa =

Maria Bona
- Princess Konrad of Bavaria
- Princess Bona shortly after her marriage to Prince Konrad in May 1921
- Born: 1 August 1896; Castle of Agliè, Piedmont
- Died: 2 February 1971 (aged 74); Rome, Italy
- Burial: Andechs Abbey, Germany
- Spouse: Prince Konrad of Bavaria (m. 1921; died 1969)
- Issue: Princess Amalie Isabella of Bavaria; Prince Eugen of Bavaria
Names
- Italian: Maria Bona Margherita Albertina Vittoria
- House: House of Savoy-Genoa (by birth); House of Wittelsbach (by marriage)
- Father: Prince Tommaso, Duke of Genoa
- Mother: Princess Isabella of Bavaria

Princess Bona of Savoy-Genoa, later Princess Bona of Bavaria (Maria Bona Margherita Albertina Vittoria; 1 August 1896 – 2 February 1971) was the daughter of Prince Tommaso, Duke of Genoa, and Princess Isabella of Bavaria.

== Family and early life ==
Bona was the third of six children born to Prince Tommaso, Duke of Genoa and his wife Princess Isabella of Bavaria. Her father was a grandson of King Charles Albert of Sardinia. Among her siblings were Ferdinando, 3rd Duke of Genoa; Filiberto, 4th Duke of Genoa; and Eugenio, 5th Duke of Genoa. Her mother Isabella was a granddaughter of Ludwig I of Bavaria.

Through her aunt Margherita of Savoy, she was a cousin of Victor Emmanuel III of Italy.

Bona was born at Castle of Agliè, Piedmont. Her father had bought the eleventh-century castle shortly before his marriage with Isabella. They passed their honeymoon there.

== Marriage ==
On 8 January 1921, Bona married her second cousin, Prince Konrad of Bavaria. He was the youngest son of Prince Leopold of Bavaria and Archduchess Gisela of Austria. Through his father, he was a great-grandson of Ludwig I of Bavaria, and through his mother was a grandson of Franz Joseph I of Austria. The wedding took place at Castle Agliè in Piedmont, Italy (where she was born). It was attended by King Victor Emmanuel III of Italy, Crown Prince Umberto, and the Duke of Aosta, among others. The wedding is notable for being the first royal marriage between two enemy houses since World War I began and ended. It was also remarkable as a gathering of royalty representing the Houses of Habsburg, Savoy, and Wittelsbach.

The couple had two children:

- Princess Amalie Isabella of Bavaria (15 December 1921 in Munich – 28 March 1985 in Milan), married on 25 August 1949 in Lugano, Count Umberto Poletti-Galimberta, Count of Assandri (21 June 1921 in Milan – 18 February 1995 in Milan), son of Luciano Poletti and Adriana Galimberti. They had issue.
- Prince Eugen of Bavaria (16 July 1925 in Munich – 1 January 1997 in Grasse), married Countess Helene of Khevenhüller-Metsch (4 April 1921 in Vienna – 25 December 2017 in Bad Hindelang), daughter of Prince Franz of Khevenhüller-Metsch and Princess Anna of Fürstenberg. They have no issue.

== Later life ==
At the end of the Second World War, Prince Konrad was arrested by the French military at Hinterstein. He was brought to Lindau and temporarily interned in the hotel Bayerischer Hof, together with among others the German Crown Prince Wilhelm and the former Nazi diplomat Hans Georg von Mackensen. Princess Bona, who worked during the war as a nurse, stayed afterwards with her relatives in Savoy. She was prohibited from entering Germany and was not reunited with her family until 1947. In later years Prince Konrad worked on the Board of German automaker NSU.

Bona died on 2 February 1971 in Rome. Her tomb can be found in the church of the Andechs Abbey, in Germany. Her husband Prince Konrad died on 6 September 1969.

== Honours ==
- Dame of the Order of the Starry Cross
- Lady of Honour of the Order of Theresa
- Dame of the Order of Saint Elizabeth

== Ancestry ==
Ancestors of Princess Maria Bona of Savoy-Genoa

8. Charles Albert of Sardinia
4. Prince Ferdinando, Duke of Genoa
9. Archduchess Maria Theresa of Austria
2. Prince Tommaso, Duke of Genoa
10. John of Saxony
5. Princess Elisabeth of Saxony
11. Princess Amalie Auguste of Bavaria
1. Princess Maria Bona of Savoy-Genoa
12. Ludwig I of Bavaria
6. Prince Adalbert of Bavaria
13. Princess Therese of Saxe-Hildburghausen
3. Princess Isabella of Bavaria
14. Infante Francisco de Paula of Spain
7. Infanta Amalia of Spain
15. Princess Luisa Carlotta of the Two Sicilies
