= Gisela Gymnasium =

Gisela-Gymnasium München
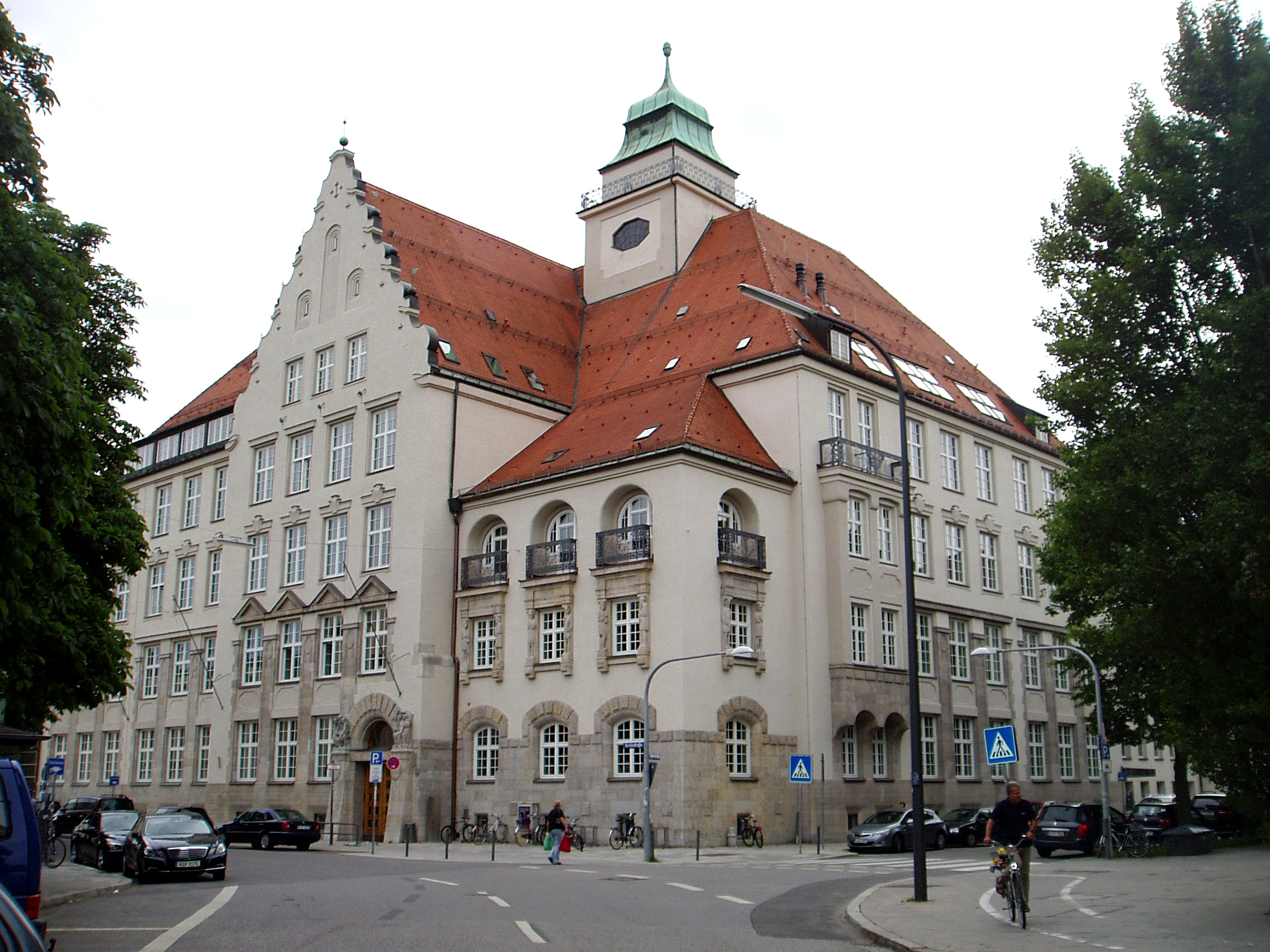

Location
- Arcisstraße 65, 80801 Munich; Bavaria; 48°9′24.14″N 11°34′24.25″E

Information
- Type: Gymnasium
- Established: 1904
- Headmaster: Marianne Achatz
- Gender: mixed
- Enrollment: approx. 850
- Language: German
- Years: 5-12 (formerly 5-13)
- Website: Gisela-Gymnasium München

The Gisela-Gymnasium München is a secondary school in Munich, Germany and belongs to the mathematical-scientific category of gymnasia but also has a modern languages branch. The school is named after its patron, the Archduchess Gisela of Austria who resided in the nearby Leopoldschlößchen with her family during her time in the city and played a significant role in local social and political events of the time.

It has regular exchange programmes with schools in England (The Abbey School, Reading since 1990 and Haberdashers' Aske's School for Girls in Elstree between 1991 and 1998), France (Collège Louis Michel in Saint-Junien-la-Bregère since 1982) and Italy (Liceo Scientifico Statale Giovanni da Castiglione in Castiglion Fiorentino.

== Location ==
The school is located in the ancient borough of Schwabing in the Northwestern part of the city opposite the Elisabethmarkt and the Berufsschule für KfZ Mechanik (Municipal Vocational School for Vehicle Mechanics).

== History ==
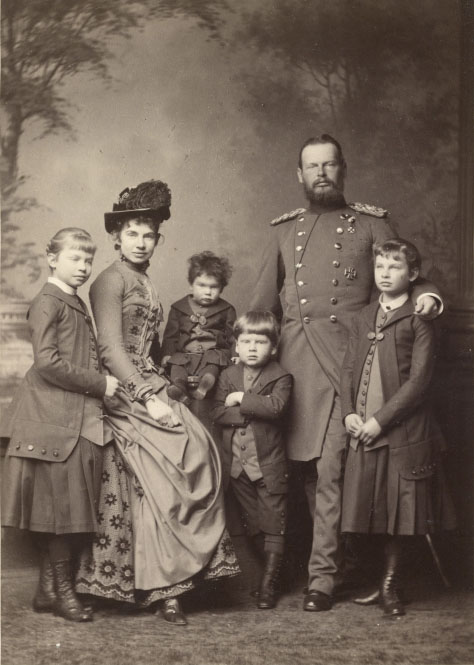
Archduchess Gisela of Austria (second from the left), patron of the school, and her family ca 1890

The original school was designed by the architect Cajetan Pacher in a Neo-Renaissance style and contained 23 classrooms, a sports hall and a period school botanical garden. It first opened on 21 September 1904 following increasing demand by the population for new secondary schools to alleviate the oversubscribed existing schools in the area. It was one of three new schools that were built in the area and originally classified as a Kreisrealschule (District Realschule). It initially had 273 students spread across 4 years and 10 teachers. Student numbers increased quickly and by 1911 the school had over 700 students. Due to increasing need for additional space, the school was extended for the first time in 1911, only 7 years after it was first opened. In 1920 the school achieved the additional status of a Seminarschule (Teacher Training School) and has been involved in the training of new teachers since.

During the World War I, the school was used to house the 1. Pionier-Einsatzbatallion (military engineer operational battalion), forcing the school to conduct a large number of classes in alternate locations. At the same time, a large number of students took an active role in the war either by volunteering for military service or by getting involved in other activities to aid the war. Towards the end of the war the school was then used as a military hospital.

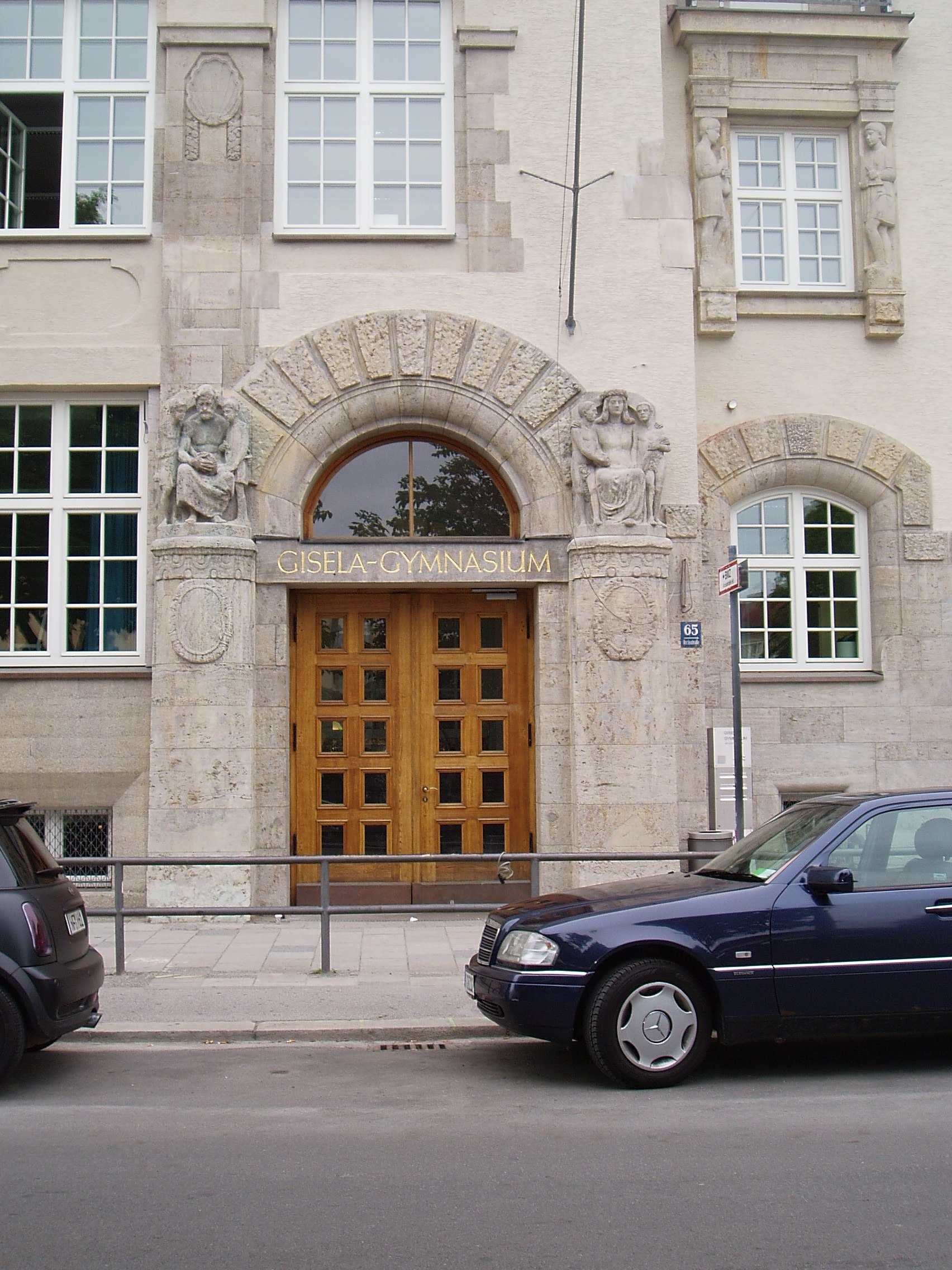
Detail of front entrance

The period following saw the establishment of first student councils and an increase in the number of subjects taught, including French and English. As the school continued to develop, it was re-designated a Staatliche Realschule (State Realschule) in 1924 and an Oberrealschule (upper realschule) in 1928.

Official records from 1933 onwards must be read in the light of the rise of Nazism but show an increasing politicisation of the students and influence on the operations of the school at every level. This ranged from student member membership in Nazi organisations such as the Hitler Youth and the Jungvolk to impacts on the curriculum and political indoctrination of the students. The school continued to operate normal classes until 1942 but from the onwards suffered increasing disruption. Year 8 was cut in 1943, classes were merged and many of the youngest students were sent to the countryside. The remaining students (as young as 11) increasingly were drafted into anti-aircraft defence and fire services in and around Munich. At the end of the war, almost 200 students had been killed and the building severely damaged.

After the end of the World War II, the school had to be rebuilt and resumed limited operations from December 1945 onwards with classes of up to 53 students, with many classes held outside the school wherever rooms were available. Parents, teachers and students unofficially carried out initial emergency work to stabilise the building and clear it from rubble. Permission for rebuilding was granted in 1946 and student number increased again despite the limited resources and ongoing rebuilding of the school and full operation only resumed in 1948. Rebuilding finished in 1955 with the addition of a two-storey sports hall.

The school gradually introduced the Kollegstufe system between 1971 and 1973 and again re-classified as a Gymnasium of the mathematical-scientific branch in 1965. An additional branch of modern languages was added in 1987, adding Latin, Spanish and Italian to the curriculum.

Student numbers fluctuated heavily in the post-war period, dipping from its peak of some 1300 students in the 70's to just over 600 in the 90's only gradually to recover and stabilise eventually at about 800 students with some 60 full-time teaching staff. Composition of the student body also changed with increasing numbers of students from Aussiedler, migrant and immigrant background.

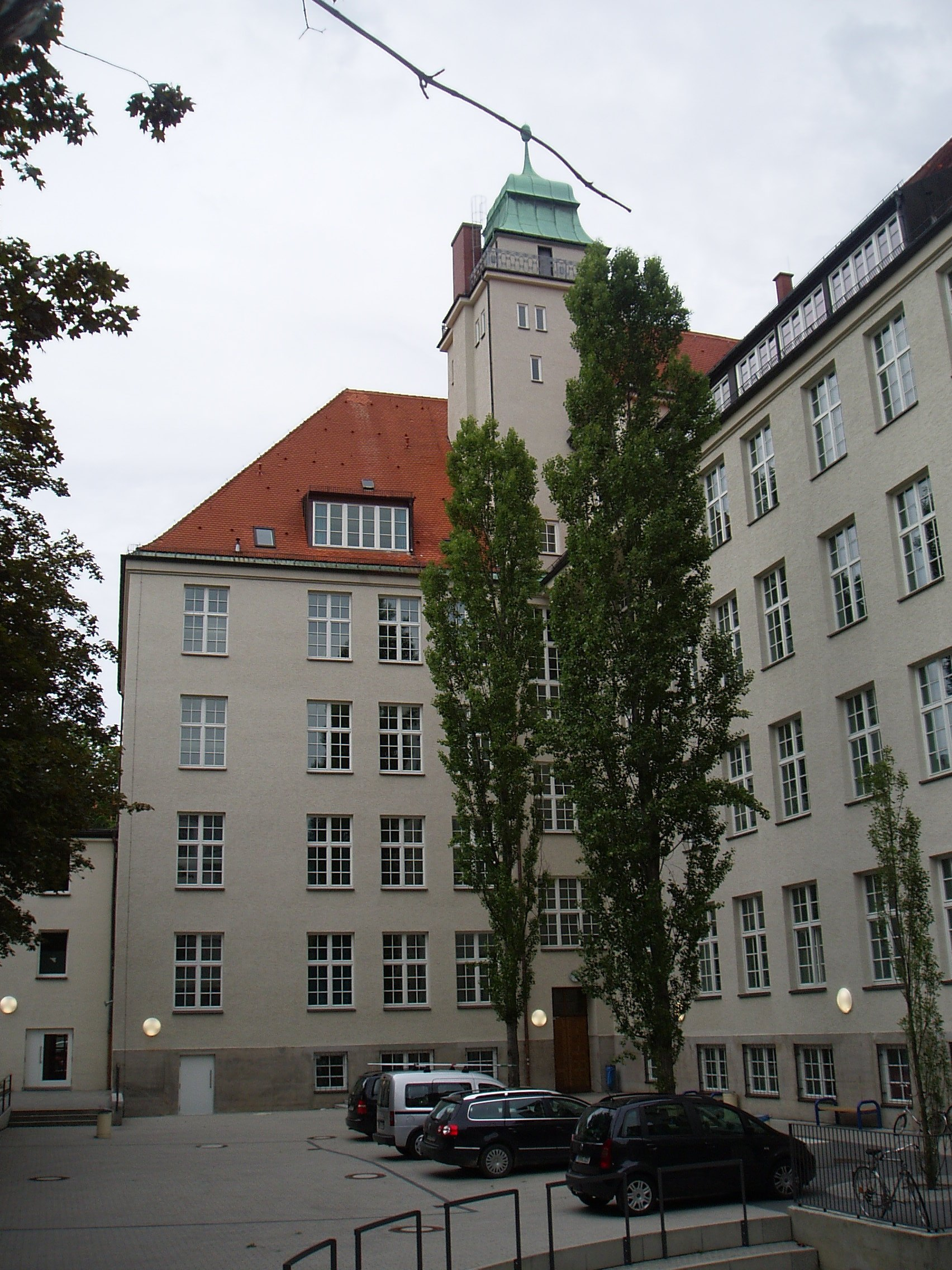
The central building viewed from the courtyard

In spite of the dip in student numbers the school suffered from chronic overcrowding, not least because when the school was rebuilt after the war the original floor plan was broadly retained. But as a municipal school, the Gymnasium is funded by the City of Munich and does not receive any regular funding from the Free State of Bavaria. Due to the lack of city funds, only minor repairs and improvements, in addition to normal maintenance, were carried out and the campaign for a full renovation and extension of the school only succeeded in June 2008 when the Bavarian Federal Government made a grant available to the school in addition to the municipal funding for the project.

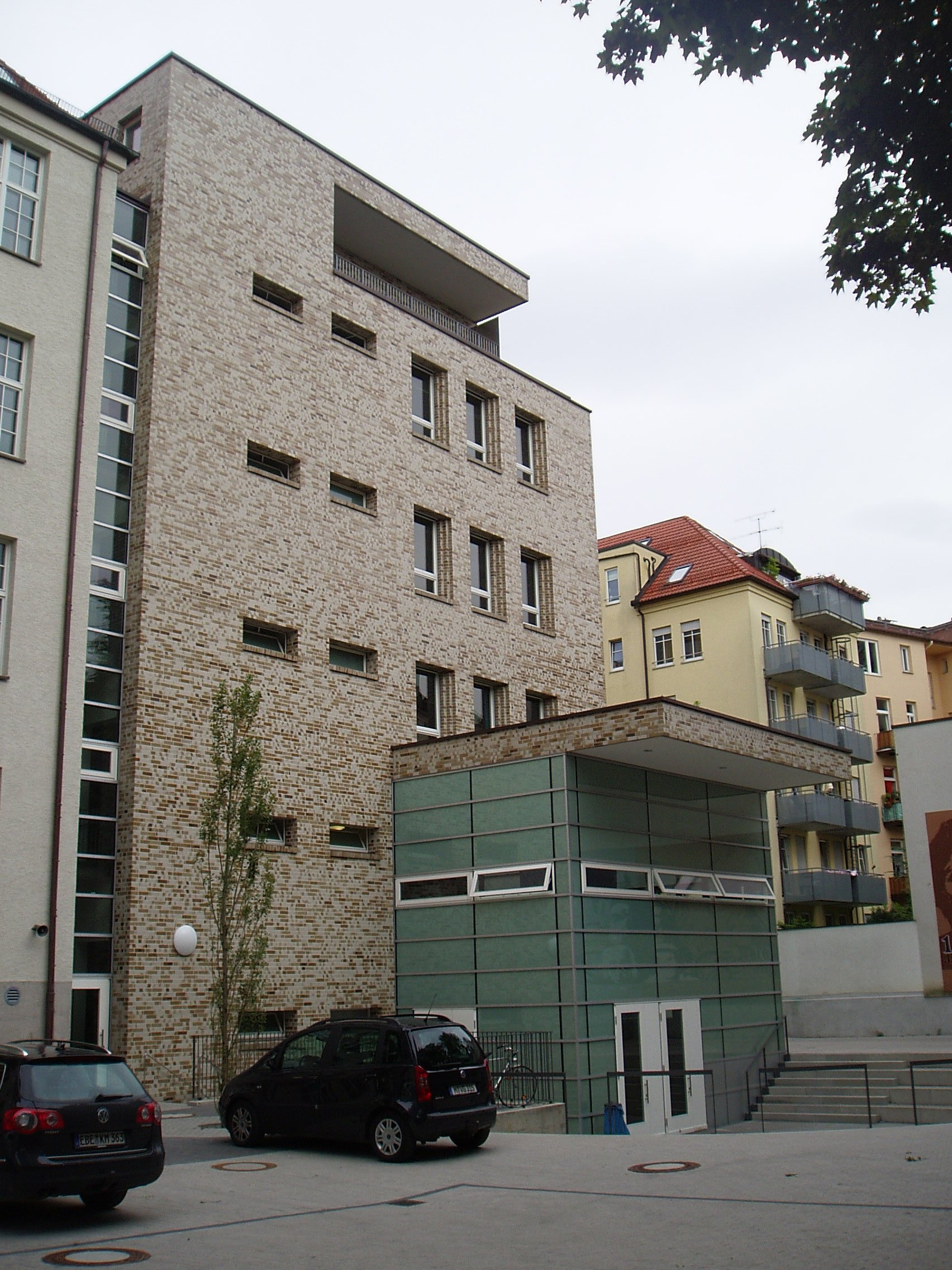
The recently completed new wing

The school recently participated in the trial runs for the planned shortened Gymnasium lasting only 8 instead of 9 years, the so-called G8. Along with the normal curriculum of a mathematical-scientific Gymnasium with a modern languages branch, the school today also offers a wide variety of optional subjects and extra-curricular activities including Japanese, Russian, pottery (the school has its own kiln, technical drawing, jazz, theatre, cabaret and chess clubs.

In 2002 parents and alumni of the school set up a charity called Freundes- und Förderkreis Gisela-Gymnasium München e.V. (Friends and Supporters of the Gisela Gymnasium Munich) to support the school and contribute to its development. Also known by its abbreviation FF/Gi/Gy, it had close to 200 members in 2004 and has been active in various projects in and around the school since.

== Women in the Gisela Gymnasium ==
In 1953 the school was assigned two female teachers for the first time - and against the futile protestations of the then headmaster Dr Hans Buchner. By 1972 13 out of 66 teachers were female. The school became a co-educational school in 1981/82 and although male teachers and students still outnumber females, the ratio is much close to being half and half today and the school has had a female headmaster for the first time since 2001.

== Deaf students ==
The school has been participating in the mainstreaming of students with hearing disabilities since 1984. It has special facilities such as 4 sound insulated circular (to enable lip reading) classrooms with an integrated audio-system. Special mixed transfer classes exist in year 10 and 11, enabling students who have come from specialised educational facilities to integrate into the mainstream system and complete their Abitur.

== Events throughout the year ==
From the student's point of view the big events of the school term are:

- the first Wandertag (hiking day) where each class goes for a hike in or near Munich, usually chosen by the class and main teacher
- the Weihnachtsbazaar (Christmas market) organised by the school's student organisation where students put on a variety of activities and stalls to raise money for charity
- the Zwischenzeugnis (half-term report card) at the end of the second week in February
- the Bundesjugendspiele (federal youth sports day) where students are required to take part in sporting activities in a federal competition
- the second Wandertag (hiking day)
- the Sommerfest (summer festival) involving various activities and events, a beer garden in the schools courtyard
- the Abiturstreich (mischief day) where the final year students pull a pre-planned prank on the students and teachers which over the years has involved students putting crushed garlic on all door handles, padlocking all doors before school, water-gunning classes and teachers and similar. Customarily, school finishes early on the day of the Abiturstreich
- the Jahreszeugnis (end of term report card) or Abiturzeugnis (graduation report card) in the case of the final year students

== School projects ==
A group of students participated 2013 to 2014 at the project „DENK MAL – Erinnerung im öffentlichen Raum“ at the school. The students erected a plaque at the entrance of the school in remembrance of the murdered and prosecuted Jewish students in Nazi Germany. A commemoration ceremony took place on 10 November 2014. The project received letters from German Chancellor Angela Merkel and the German President Joachim Gauck congratulating them. The Project was supported by the International Tracing Service.

== Headmasters of the School ==
Marianne Achatz 2001-

Axel Müller-Nordhorn (1942-) 1990-2001

Ernst Weinzierl (1927-?) 1980-1990

Albert Lehmeier (1916-?) 1972-1980

Dr Hans Buchner 1951-1972

Dr Stephan Ankenbrand (1884-?) 1948-1951

Andreas Blaha (1879-?) 1945-1948

Albert Dittmar (1888-?) 1943-1945

Dr Georg Wetzstein (1876-?) 1932-1943

Dr Karl Manger (1866-1932) 1920-1932

Wilhelm Orscheidt (?-1925) 1916-1920

Peter Arnold (1849-1918) 1904-1916
