= Georg von Schnitzler =

German industrialist and war criminal (1884–1962)

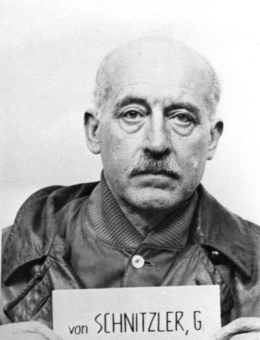
- Schnitzler after his arrest by the U.S. Army in 1945
- Born: 29 August 1884; Cologne, Rhine Province, Prussia, German Empire
- Died: 24 May 1962 (aged 77); Basel, Switzerland
- Education: University of Leipzig
- Occupation: Business executive
- Employer: IG Farben
- Political party: Nazi Party
- Spouse: Lily von Mallinckrodt
- Convictions: War crimes Crimes against humanity
- Penalty: 5 years imprisonment

Georg August Eduard von Schnitzler (29 October 1884 – 24 May 1962) was a German nobleman, member of the board at IG Farben and a Nazi war criminal.

== Early years ==
Born into the family of briefadel, Georg was as the son of Paul Wilhelm Jakob von Schnitzler (1856–1932) and his wife, Fanny Emilie Joest (1861), younger sister of Carl August von Joest (1858–1942). Schnitzler studied law at a number of universities, eventually completing his doctorate at the University of Leipzig in 1907. After a year's travel he went to work for Bankhaus J.H. Stein of Cologne.

== Personal life ==
He married Lilly Bertha Dorothea von Mallinckrodt (1889–1991) in 1910. His new wife was a noted figure in German high society and Georg von Schnitzer himself was noted for his immaculate dress sense and expensive tastes in wine and the arts.

They had one daughter, Gabrielle von Schnitzler (1918–2017), who married Count Franz Joseph von Seefried auf Buttenheim, Freiherr zu Hagenbach, the youngest son of Princess Elisabeth Marie of Bavaria and her husband, Count Otto Ludwig Philipp von Seefried auf Buttenheim, Freiherr zu Hagenbach (1870–1951).

== Corporate career ==
In 1912, Schnitzler moved to Farbwerke Hoechst, a company where his father held a leading position, and worked as a salesman of dyes in Munich for them. He joined the board as an alternate member in 1920 and achieved full membership in 1924. The company merged with IG Farben in 1925 and he was appointed an alternate member of their board, eventually becoming manager of their sales department in 1930. In 1927, he oversaw the establishment of a Franco-German dye sales cartel, and by 1932, had added Swiss and British companies to the arrangement. He became chairman of the Commercial Committee of IG Farben in 1937.

== Barcelona Exposition ==
An established industrialist, Schnitzler was hired pro bono to represent Germany as the Commissar-General for the 1929 Barcelona Exposition. Urged on by his wife, he offered the position of architect to Mies van der Rohe. Lilly had met the up-and-coming architect in 1925 and recognized him as the German equivalent to Le Corbusier. Schnitzler's work on the building committee for the construction of the new IG Farben headquarters and forging of a competition, won by Hans Poelzig, earned him qualified experience to fulfill the national role in Spain. Despite significant economic political headwinds against a national pavilion, Schnitzler colluded alongside Mies van der Rohe to build a representation space that incurred significant personal financial strain and cost. Considered a masterpiece of slim down Modernist design, it is likely many of the initial design elements may have been removed simply due to economic constraint. Nevertheless, without the financial backing of Schnitzler to the tune of 150,000 Reichsmark, Mies van der Rohe's canonic masterpiece might never have existed.

== Under the Nazis ==
In February 1933, Schnitzer supported moves for IG Farben to provide financial backing to the Nazi Party. He had recently represented the company at a summit of leading German industrialists organised by Hjalmar Schacht and addressed by Adolf Hitler and had been impressed by the Nazi leader. Schnitzler did not immediately seek to join the Nazis after their seizure of power although he did establish a "salon" in Berlin at which high-ranking Nazis and leading industrialists could meet and discuss issues of mutual benefit. However he joined the Sturmabteilung (SA), the Nazi Party paramilitary organisation, in 1934 and eventually held the rank of SA-Sturmhauptführer (later redesignated SA-Hauptsturmführer). He was admitted to the Nazi Party in 1937.

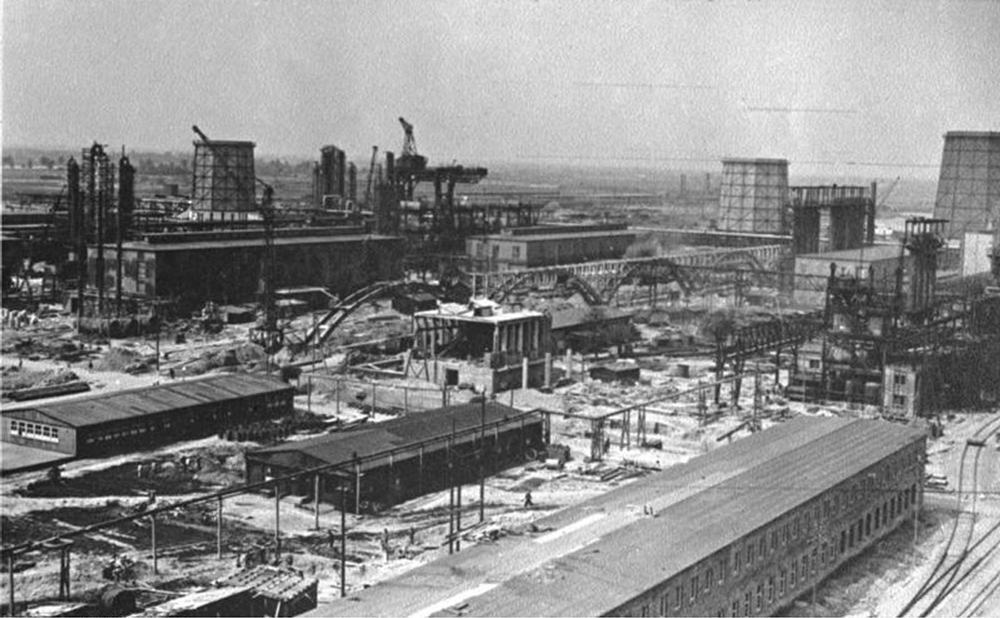
IG Farben plant under construction at Buna-werke at Monowitz approximately 10 kilometres (6.2 mi) from Auschwitz, 1942

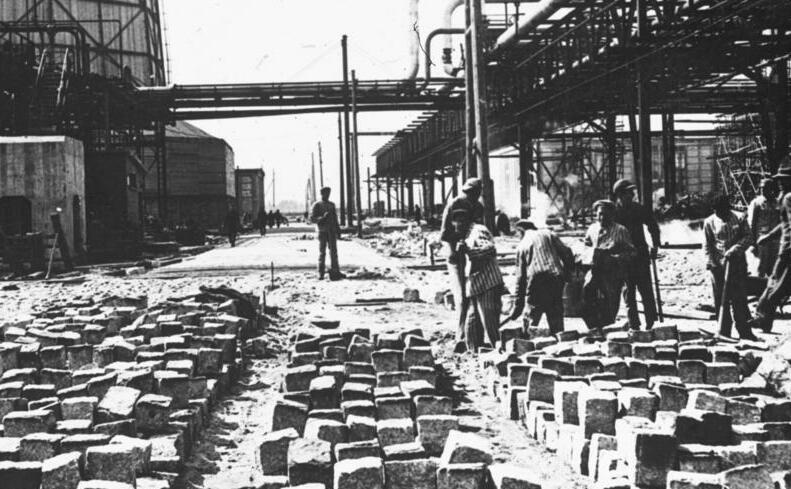
Concentration camp prisoners, identified by striped clothes at work in Monowitz

In 1938, Schnitzler developed a scheme whereby IG Farben would fund German newspapers in Czechoslovakia to drive a massive pro-Nazi propaganda campaign. The scheme, which was eventually directed by Max Ilgner, played a central role in gaining ethnic German support for the annexation of the Sudetenland and the destruction of Czechoslovakia. He was also aware of the projected invasion of Poland during the summer of 1939 after being told of the plans by his friend Claus Ungewitter, an official in the Economics Ministry and an associate of leading figures in the Schutzstaffel. Following the invasion of Poland, Schnitzler was sent into the country as the leader of an IG Farben delegation and in this role he ensured that a number of important Polish chemical factories came under the company's control. Following the invasion of France, Schnitzler was once again despatched and once again he secured a number of chemical sites in France for IG Farben.

Schnitzler was named one of the Nazi regime's Wehrwirtschaftsführers (war economy leaders) in 1942. His role at IG Farben continued to grow and in 1943 he was named chairman of the Chemical Committee. According to Diarmuid Jeffreys, Schnitzler was around this time also made aware of the "Final Solution" after his friend Martin Müller-Cunradi had told him about it following a visit to Buna Werke in 1943. With defeat imminent, Schnitzler dropped off the IG Farben scene in March 1945, retiring to his country estate at Oberursel (Taunus). Russell Nixon and James Martin, two agents attached to the US Military Government's Cartels Division, arrived on the estate in May and arrested Schnitzler.

== Post-war life ==
In the questioning following his arrest, Schnitzler admitted to some "mistakes" on his part and agreed that IG Farben as a company had played a central role in the growth of Hitler and his arming of Germany. His frank responses did not meet the approval of many of his old colleagues and during a period of fraternisation in prison he was confronted by an angry Fritz ter Meer. Following their conversation, Schnitzler announced that he wished to withdraw his earlier statements, claiming that they had been delivered under extreme pressure.

Indicted by the United States after the Second World War for war crimes in the IG Farben trial, Schnitzer was found guilty of "plunder and spoliation" and sentenced to five years imprisonment on 30 July 1948. However, after the U.S. military instituted a good behavior credit system, Schnitzler, who had been in custody since 1945, was released from prison on 21 December 1949, several months before his sentence was scheduled to expire. Following his release, he returned to the business world as president of Deutsch-Ibero-Amerikanische Gesellschaft. He also returned to high society and occasionally showed up in the pages of European magazines covering these upper echelons.

== Sources ==
- Diarmuid Jeffreys, Hell's Cartel: IG Farben and the Making of Hitler's War Machine, Bloomsbury, 2009
