= Prince Konrad of Bavaria =

Bavarian prince (1883–1969)

Prince Konrad
- Konrad in 1918
- Born: 22 November 1883; Munich, Bavaria
- Died: 6 September 1969 (aged 85); Hinterstein, Bavaria
- Burial: Andechs Abbey cemetery, Bavaria
- Spouse: Princess Bona Margherita of Savoy-Genoa (m. 1921)
- Issue: Princess Amalie Isabella; Prince Eugen
- House: Wittelsbach
- Father: Prince Leopold of Bavaria
- Mother: Archduchess Gisela of Austria

Prince Konrad of Bavaria (German: Konrad Luitpold Franz Joseph Maria Prinz von Bayern; 22 November 1883 – 6 September 1969) was a member of the Bavarian Royal House of Wittelsbach.

== Early life ==
Konrad was born in Munich, Bavaria. He was the youngest child of Prince Leopold of Bavaria and his wife Archduchess Gisela of Austria. During World War I, like his older brother Georg, Konrad served in the Royal Bavarian Army mainly on the Eastern Front. He was promoted to Major on 10 September 1914. From 3 December 1917 until the end of the war, he served as commander of the 2nd Heavy Cavalry Regiment "Archduke Franz Ferdinand of Austria" (Königlich Bayerisches 2. Schwere-Reiter-Regiment „Erzherzog Franz Ferdinand von Österreich-Este“). He resigned from the military on 6 February 1919.

== Marriage ==
On 8 January 1921 Prince Konrad married Princess Bona Margherita of Savoy-Genoa, the daughter of Prince Tomaso of Savoy-Genoa and Princess Isabella of Bavaria. The wedding took place at the Castello Agliè in Piedmont, Italy.

The couple had two children:

- Princess Amalie Isabella of Bavaria (15 December 1921 in Munich – 28 March 1985 in Milan), married on 25 August 1949 in Lugano, Count Umberto Poletti-Galimberta, Count of Assandri (21 June 1921 in Milan – 18 February 1995 in Milan), son of Luciano Poletti and Adriana Galimberti. They have issue.
- Prince Eugen of Bavaria (16 July 1925 in Munich – 1 January 1997 in Grasse), married Countess Helene of Khevenhüller-Metsch (4 April 1921 in Vienna – 25 December 2017 in Bad Hindelang), daughter of Count Franz of Khevenhüller-Metsch and Princess Anna of Fürstenberg. They have no issue.

== Post World War II ==
At the end of the Second World War, Prince Konrad was arrested by the French military at Hinterstein, brought to Lindau and temporarily interned in the hotel Bayerischer Hof, together with among others, the German Crown Prince Wilhelm and the former Nazi diplomat Hans Georg von Mackensen. Princess Bona who worked during the war as a nurse, stayed afterwards with her relatives in Savoy, prohibited from entering Germany, she was not reunited with her family until 1947. In the later years Prince Konrad worked on the Board of German auto-maker NSU.

== Death ==
Prince Konrad of Bavaria died on 6 September 1969 at Hinterstein in the Oberallgäu region of Bavaria. He is buried at the Andechs Abbey cemetery in Bavaria.

== Honours ==
Prince Konrad received the following orders and decorations:

=== German states ===
- Kingdom of Bavaria:
  - Order of Saint Hubert
  - Order of Saint George, Grand Prior (1905)
  - Military Merit Order, 4th Class with Crown and Swords (31 October 1914)
  - Military Merit Order, 3rd Class with Swords (11 June 1918)
  - Jubilee Medal for the Bavarian Army (2 March 1905)
  - à la suite of the Royal Bavarian 1st Heavy Cavalry Regiment (Königlich Bayerisches 1. Schwere-Reiter-Regiment „Prinz Karl von Bayern“)
- Duchy of Anhalt: Order of Albert the Bear, Grand Cross
- Grand Duchy of Baden: House Order of Fidelity
- Duchy of Brunswick:
  - Order of Henry the Lion, Grand Cross
  - War Merit Cross 2nd Class (7 March 1915)
- Hohenzollern principalities: Princely House Order of Hohenzollern, Honor Cross 1st Class with Swords (20 February 1918)
- House of Nassau: Order of the Golden Lion of the House of Nassau
  - Order of the Black Eagle
  - Iron Cross 2nd Class (27 October 1914)
  - Iron Cross 1st Class (17 July 1915)
  - Cross of the Mount of Olives
- Kingdom of Saxony: Albert Order, Knight 1st Class with Swords (11 February 1916)
- (Saxe-Coburg and Gotha) (Duchy of Saxe-Altenburg) (Saxe-Meiningen) Saxon duchies: Ducal Saxe-Ernestine House Order, Commander 2nd Class with Swords (25 October 1918)
- Kingdom of Württemberg: Order of the Württemberg Crown, Grand Cross

=== Foreign states ===
- (Austrian Empire) (Kingdom of Hungary) Austria-Hungary:
  - Order of the Golden Fleece (1907)
  - Order of the Iron Crown, 3rd Class with War Decoration (6 June 1916)
  - Military Merit Cross 3rd Class with War Decoration (15 June 1915)
  - Order of Saint Stephen of Hungary, Grand Cross (1912)
- Ottoman Empire:
  - Order of Osmanieh 1st Class
  - Order of the Medjidie 1st Class
  - Liakat Medal in Gold with Sabers (13 January 1916)
  - War Medal (13 January 1916)
- Papal States: Order of the Holy Sepulchre, Grand Cross
- Kingdom of Portugal: Military Order of Christ, Grand Cross
- Kingdom of Siam (Thailand): Order of the White Elephant, Grand Cross
- Spain:
  - Order of Charles III, Knight Grand Cross (9 February 1906)
  - Cross of the Military Knightly Order of Our Lady of Montesa
- United Kingdom: Royal Victorian Order, Honorary Grand Cross (21 August 1908)

== Ancestry ==
Ancestors of Prince Konrad of Bavaria

8. King Ludwig I of Bavaria
4. Prince Regent Luitpold of Bavaria
9. Therese of Bavaria
2. Prince Leopold of Bavaria
10. Leopold II, Grand Duke of Tuscany
5. Archduchess Augusta of Austria
11. Princess Maria Anna of Saxony
1. Prince Konrad of Bavaria
12. Archduke Franz Karl of Austria
6. Emperor Franz Joseph I
13. Princess Sophie of Bavaria
3. Archduchess Gisela of Austria
14. Maximilian Joseph, Duke in Bavaria
7. Elisabeth in Bavaria
15. Princess Ludovika of Bavaria

== Sources ==
- Schad, Martha,Kaiserin Elisabeth und ihre Töchter. München, Langen Müller, 1998
