= Gresten =

- Municipality
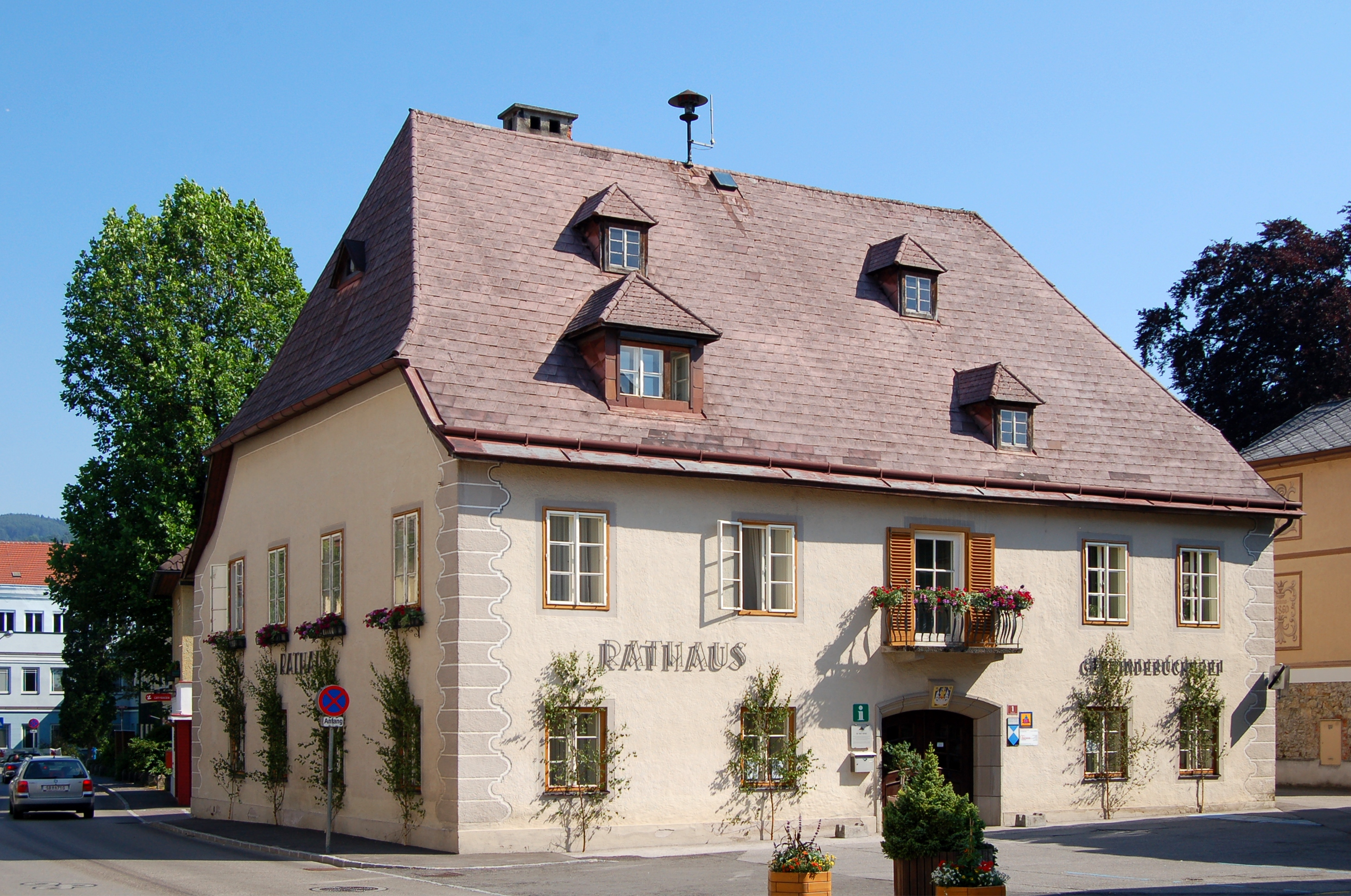
- Town hall

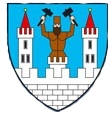
- Coat of arms

- Location within Austria Location within Lower Austria
- Coordinates: 47°59′00″N 15°01′00″E
- Country: Austria
- State: Lower Austria
- District: Scheibbs

Government
  - Mayor: Harald Gnadenberger (SPÖ)

Area
  - Total: 3.83 km^{2} (1.48 sq mi)
- Elevation: 407 m (1,335 ft)

Population (2018-01-01)
  - Total: 1,987
  - Density: 519/km^{2} (1,340/sq mi)
- Time zone: UTC+1 (CET)
  - Summer (DST): UTC+2 (CEST)
- Postal code: 3264
- Area code: 07487
- Vehicle registration: SB
- Website: https://gresten.gv.at/

Gresten is a municipality in the district of Scheibbs in Lower Austria, Austria.

== Population ==
Historical population
| Year | Pop. | ±% |
|---|---|---|
| 1971 | 1,639 | — |
| 1981 | 1,823 | +11.2% |
| 1991 | 1,889 | +3.6% |
| 2001 | 1,946 | +3.0% |
