= Church of La Concepción =

Church in Spain

Church of the Conception
- Basílica de la Concepción de Nuestra Señora
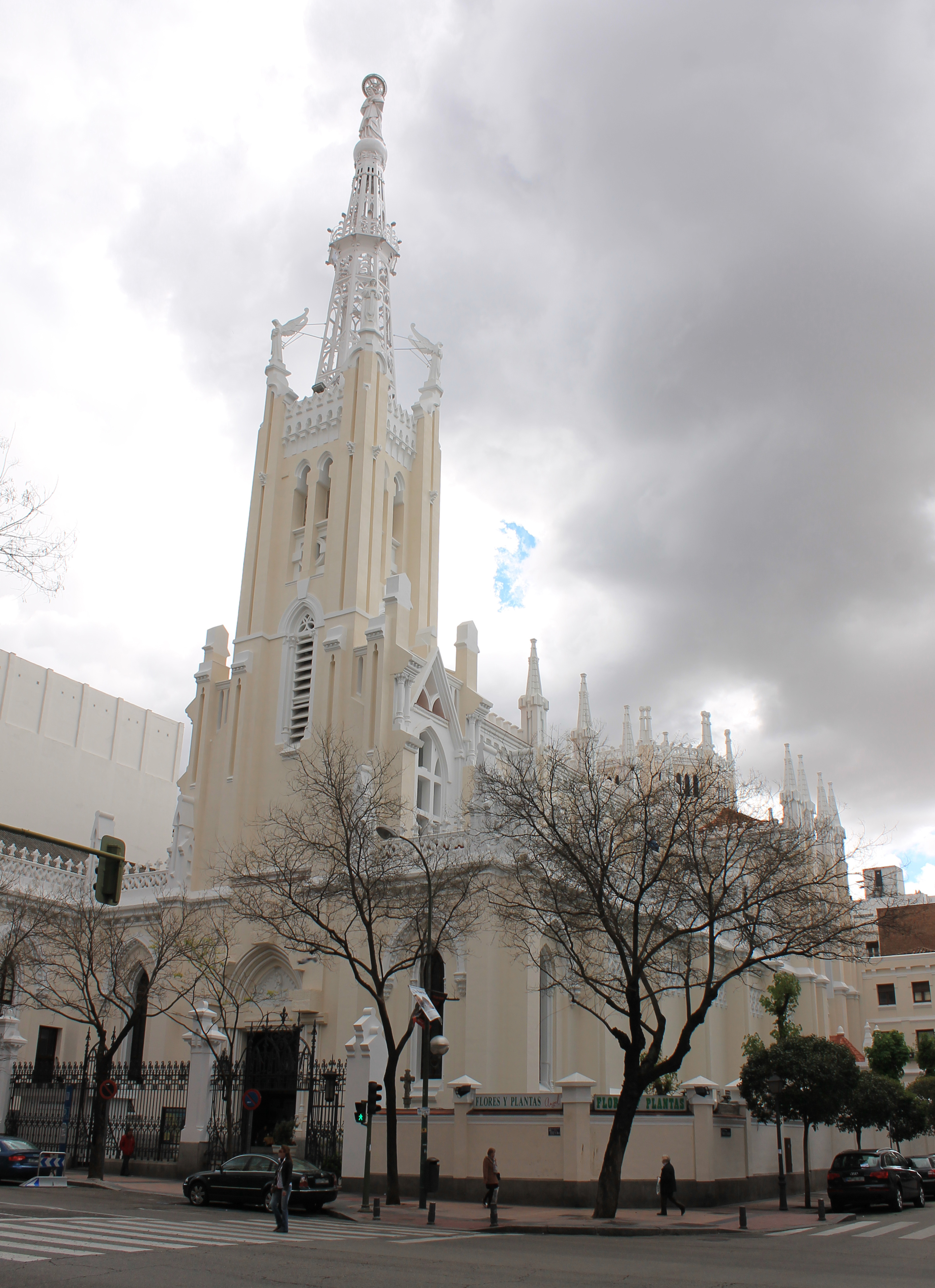
- Church of the Conception
- 40°25′28.96″N 3°40′56.81″W
- Location: Calle Goya, 26, Madrid, Spain

History
- Status: Minor basilica

Architecture
- Architect(s): Eugenio Jiménez Corera, Jesús Carrasco
- Style: Neo-Gothic
- Years built: 1912–1914
- Completed: 1914

The Church of the Conception (Spanish: Iglesia de la Concepción) is a Neogothic Catholic church and minor basilica in Madrid, Spain.

It is located on Calle Goya at the corner of Calle de Núñez de Balboa, and its construction was carried out between 1912 and 1914. The architect in charge of the church's design was Eugenio Jiménez Corera until his death in 1910. Another architect, Jesús Carrasco-Muñoz, finished the work. The tower—with a height of 43.7 m (143 ft)— is topped with an iron spire, itself crowned by a sculpture of the Immaculate Conception. King Alfonso XIII of Spain and his consort Queen Victoria Eugenie attended the church's opening; the ceremony took place 11 May 1914. The building has undergone several renovations: in the 1950s, in 1985 and 2013.

On 8 July 1977 Boletín Oficial del Estado published a report requesting the church's declaration as Bien de Interés Cultural.

On 16 April 2014, Pope Francis gave approval for the church to be conferred the dignity of a Minor basilica through a decree of the Congregation for Divine Worship. It was given to Cardinal Antonio María Rouco Varela, Archbishop of Madrid. The event coincided with the 100th anniversary of the inauguration of the church.

== See also ==
- Catholic Church in Spain
- List of oldest church buildings

== Bibliography ==
- Arquitectura y Construcción (July 1914). "Iglesia de la Purísima Concepción". Arquitectura y Construcción (in Spanish) (264). Barcelona: 155. ISSN 1887-5351.
- La Construcción Moderna (15 May 1914). "Inauguración de una iglesia en Madrid". La Construcción Moderna (in Spanish) (9). Madrid: 17. ISSN 1889-8408.
