= Bernhard von Mallinckrodt =

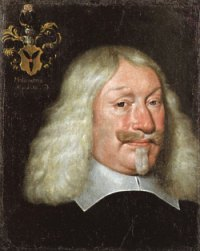
Portrait of Bernhard von Mallinckrodt by Anselm van Hulle, 1650 (Stadtmuseum Münster)

Bernhard von Mallinckrodt (29 November 1591 in Ahlen — 7 March 1664, Burg Ottenstein), dean (Domdechant) of Münster Cathedral, was a bibliophile from Mallinckrodt family, an old Westphalian noble family of Protestants, who converted to Catholicism.

== Biography ==
In 1639 he issued a pamphlet at Cologne to mark the bicentenary of the invention of printing by moveable type in Europe, defending the priority of Gutenberg; it was titled De ortu et progressu artis typographicae ("Of the rise and progress of the typographic art"), that includes the phrase prima typographicae incunabula, "the first infancy of printing". This gave rise to the term incunabula, which is still used to describe books and broadsheets printed before 1500, the arbitrary cut-off date selected by Mallinckrodt.
