= Prince Leopold of Bavaria =

German military officer (1846–1930)

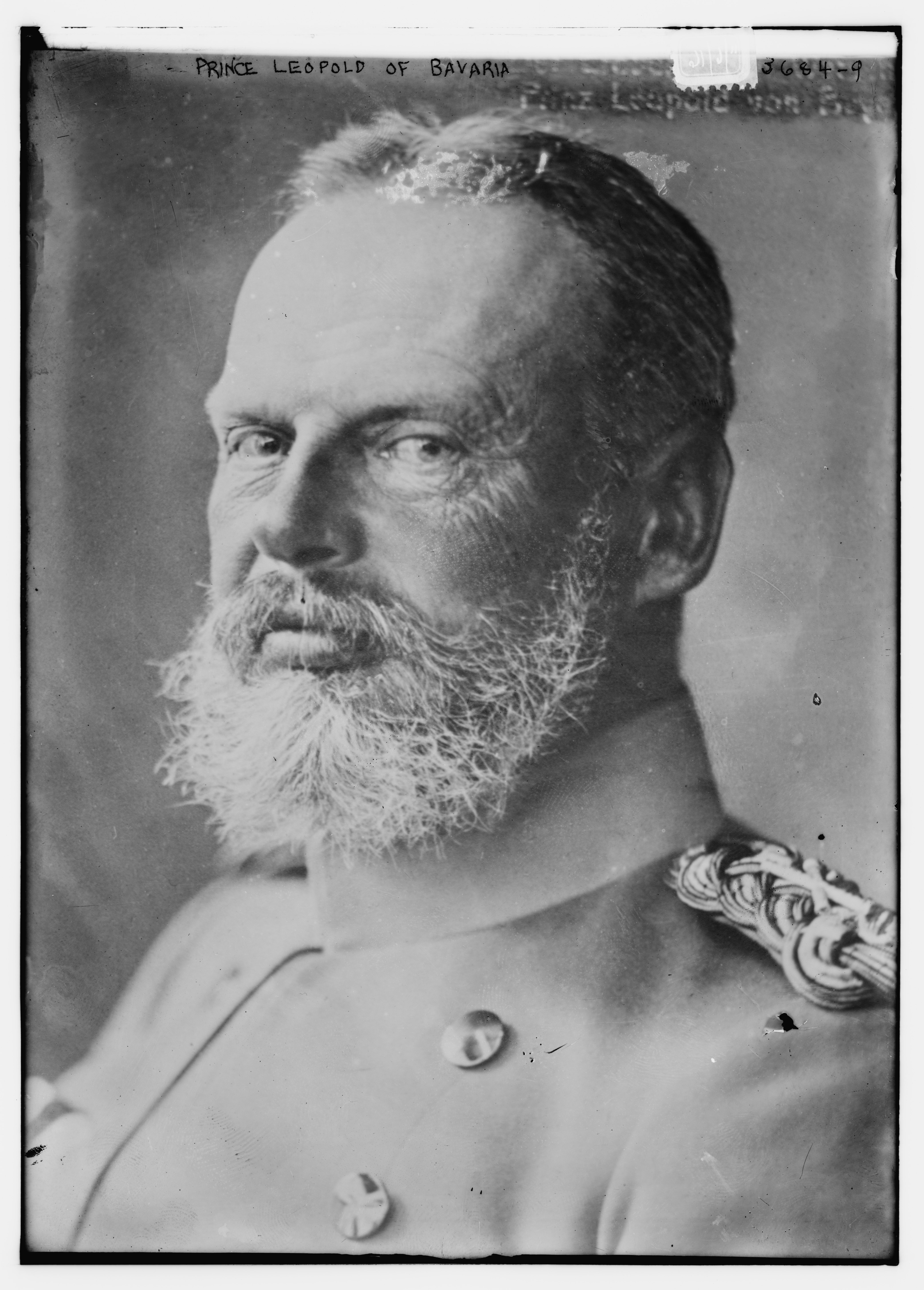
- Leopold in 1910
- Born: 9 February 1846; Munich, Kingdom of Bavaria, German Confederation
- Died: 28 September 1930 (aged 84); Munich, Bavaria, Weimar Republic
- Burial: St. Michael's Church, Munich
- Spouse: Archduchess Gisela of Austria (m. 1873)
- Issue: Princess Elisabeth, Countess of Seefried and Buttenheim; Princess Auguste, Archduchess of Austria; Prince Georg; Prince Konrad
- House: Wittelsbach
- Father: Luitpold, Prince Regent of Bavaria
- Mother: Archduchess Augusta of Austria

Prince Leopold of Bavaria (Leopold Maximilian Joseph Maria Arnulf; German: [ˈleːopɔlt maksiˈmiːli̯aːn ˈjoːzɛf maˈʁiːa ˈaʁnʊlf]; 9 February 1846 – 28 September 1930) was born in Munich, the second son of Prince Regent Luitpold of Bavaria (1821–1912) and his wife Archduchess Augusta of Austria (1825–1864). He was a Field Marshal (Generalfeldmarschall) who commanded German and Austro-Hungarian forces on the Eastern Front in World War I.

== Biography ==
=== Military career ===
Prince Leopold entered the Bavarian Army at the age of 15, and received his patent as a lieutenant dated 28 November 1861. He saw first combat during the Austro-Prussian War in 1866, where he commanded an artillery battery at Kissingen and Rossbrunn.

In 1870, King Ludwig II of Bavaria sent Leopold to the battlefields of France, where the Bavarian Army was fighting alongside the Prussian Army in the Franco-Prussian War. He served with the 3rd Bavarian Artillery Regiment and saw action at Sedan and Beauvert. He was promoted to major in December 1870. For his bravery against the enemy he received both the Iron Cross 1st and 2nd Classes, the Bavarian Military Merit Order Knight 1st Class, the Knight's Cross of the Military Order of Max Joseph, Bavaria's highest military decoration, and decorations from several other German states.

In the post-war years, Prince Leopold spent most of his time travelling, visiting Africa, Asia and countries of Europe. He was married on 20 April 1873 at Vienna to his second cousin Archduchess Gisela of Austria, daughter of Emperor Franz Joseph of Austria and the Empress Elisabeth. From 1881 to 1887 Leopold was the commander of the 1st Royal Bavarian Division, from 1887 to 1892 of the I Royal Bavarian Corps. In both commands he would be succeeded by his younger brother, Prince Arnulf of Bavaria. In 1892 Leopold became the inspector general of the 4th Army Inspection, replacing Leonhard Graf von Blumenthal. After his appointment, the 4th Army Inspection gradually became consistent of Bavarian corps. He remained in the Bavarian Army and was finally promoted to the rank of field marshal (Generalfeldmarschall) on 1 January 1905. In 1911 he ordered a 6m racing yacht "Ralle II" from the great British yacht designer Alfred Mylne, built at the Rambeck yard on Lake Starnberg. He retired from active duty in 1913 to give chances to Rupprecht, Crown Prince of Bavaria.

=== First World War ===
Prince Leopold's retirement, however, did not last long. On 16 April 1915, he was given command of the German 9th Army, replacing General August von Mackensen. Leopold quickly proved himself an able commander as he took Warsaw on 4 August 1915. Following this success, he was put in command of Army Group Prince Leopold of Bavaria (Heeresgruppe Prinz Leopold von Bayern), which was a German force in the central/northern sector of the Eastern Front. He was awarded the Grand Cross of the Military Order of Max Joseph on 5 August 1915, the prestigious Pour le Mérite, Prussia's highest military decoration, on 9 August 1915 and the oak leaves to the Pour le Mérite on 25 July 1917.

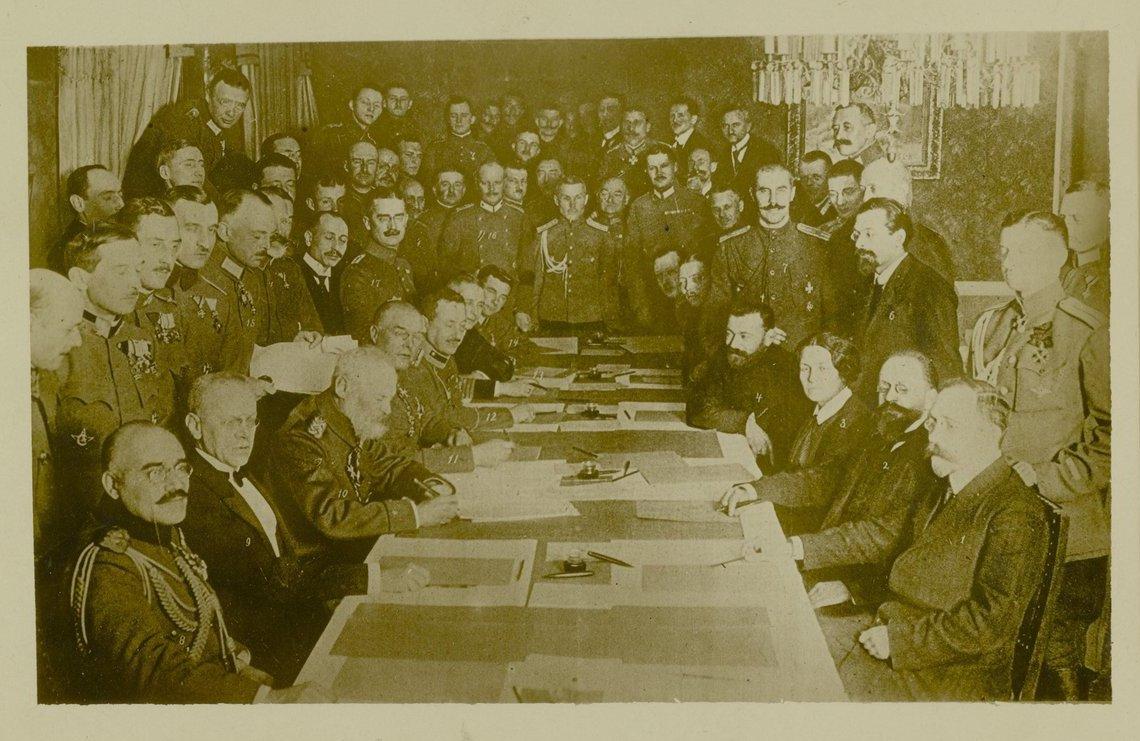
Prince Leopold signing Treaty of Brest-Litovsk.

On 29 August 1916, after the brutal summer campaigns succeeded in reversing the Brusilov Offensive against the Austrians, Leopold became the Supreme Commander of the German forces on the Eastern front (Oberbefehlshaber Ost), succeeding Field Marshal Paul von Hindenburg. Leopold held this post for the rest of the war. Because of his position, Leopold was a potential German candidate for the throne of the puppet Kingdom of Poland.

On 4 March 1918, Leopold received yet another high honor, the Grand Cross of the Iron Cross, awarded only five times during World War I.

Prince Leopold retired again in 1918 after the signing of the Treaty of Brest-Litovsk, which had ended the war on the Eastern Front. This treaty was highly favorable to Germany, and Leopold ended his career with success. He died on 28 September 1930 in Munich and is buried in the Colombarium in the Michaelskirche in Munich.

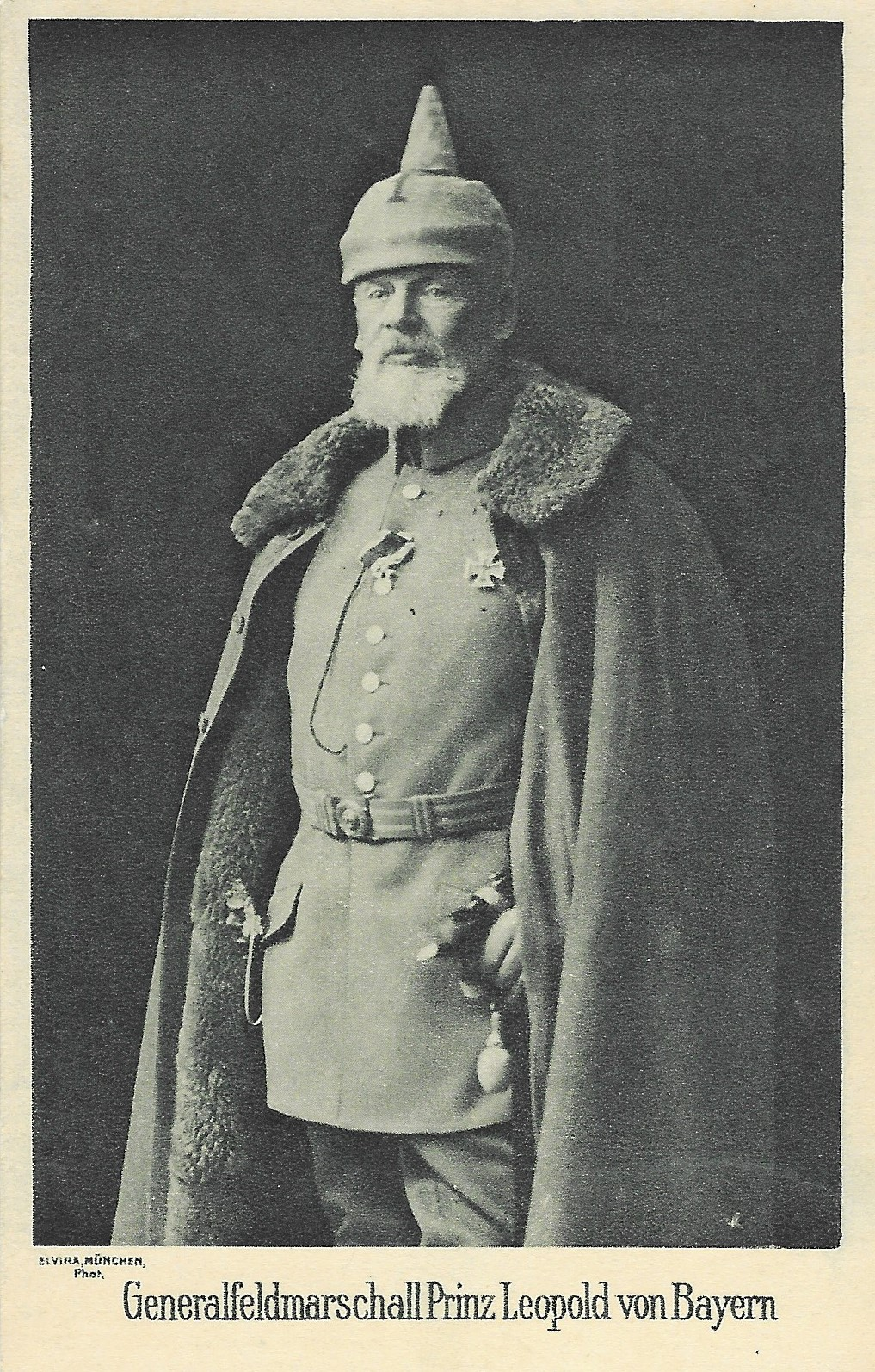
Postcard from WW1 era: General Field Marshal Leopold von Bayern

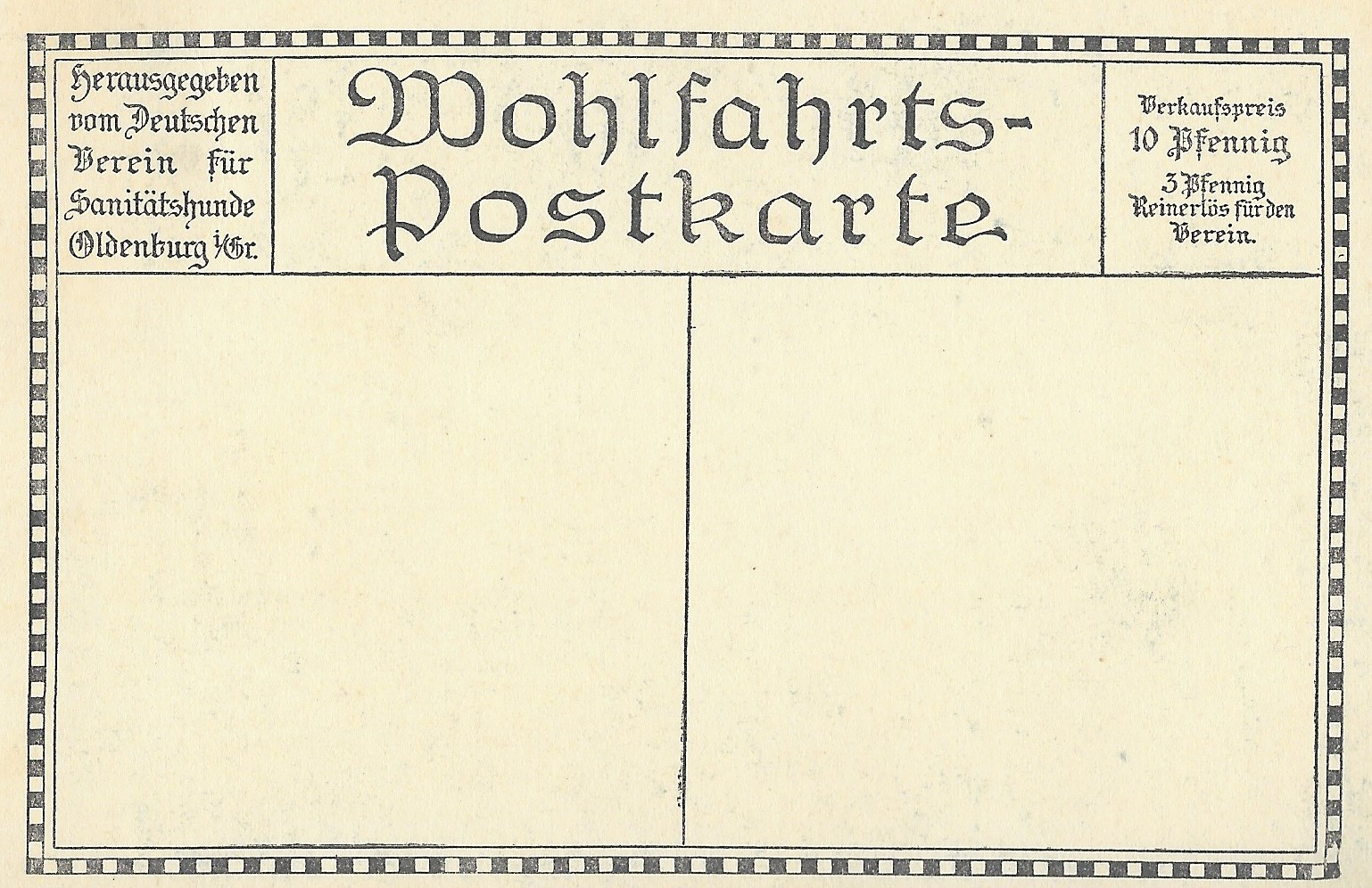
Back of postcard from WW1 era: General Field Marshal Leopold von Bayern

== Military ranks ==
- Sekondlieutenant: 28 November 1861
- Premierlieutenant: 5 June 1864
- Hauptmann: 28 April 1867
- Major: 11 December 1870
- Oberstleutnant: 27 March 1871
- Oberst: 18 February 1873
- Generalmajor: 1 November 1875
- Generalleutnant: 16 June 1881
- General der Kavallerie: 2 March 1887
- Generaloberst: 9 February 1896
- Generalfeldmarschall: 1 January 1905

== Family ==
Prince Leopold and his wife Gisela had four children:

- Princess Elisabeth Marie of Bavaria (1874–1957), who married Count Otto Ludwig Philipp von Seefried auf Buttenheim
- Princess Auguste Maria of Bavaria (1875–1964), who married Archduke Joseph August of Austria
- Prince Georg of Bavaria (1880–1943), married Archduchess Isabella of Austria
- Prince Konrad of Bavaria (1883–1969), who married Princess Bona Margherita of Savoy-Genoa

== Decorations and honors ==
=== German decorations ===
- Bavaria:
  - Knight of St. Hubert
  - Knight of the Military Merit Order, 2nd Class with Swords, ca. 1866; Grand Cross with Swords, 1917
  - Knight of the Military Order of Max Joseph, 1871; Grand Cross, 5 August 1915
  - Grand Prior of Lower Bavaria of the Royal Bavarian House Equestrian Order of St. George, 1874
  - St. George Medal
  - Ludwig Order, Honor Cross
  - Jubilee Medal with Crown
  - 1866 Army Commemorative Cross
- (Duchy of Anhalt) Anhalt: Grand Cross of Albert the Bear
- (Grand Duchy of Baden) Baden:
  - Knight of the House Order of Fidelity, 1898
  - Grand Cross of the Order of Berthold the First
- (Duchy of Brunswick) Brunswick:
  - Grand Cross of Henry the Lion, 1903
  - War Merit Cross
- (Saxe-Coburg and Gotha) (Duchy of Saxe-Altenburg) (Saxe-Meiningen) Ernestine duchies: Grand Cross of the Saxe-Ernestine House Order
- (Bremen (state)) (Hamburg) Free Hanseatic Cities: Hanseatic Crosses
- (Grand Duchy of Hesse) Hesse and by Rhine:
  - Grand Cross of the Ludwig Order, 13 January 1865
  - Military Merit Cross (1870/71), 17 June 1873
- Lippe-Detmold:
  - War Honor Cross for Heroic Deeds
  - War Merit Cross
- Mecklenburg:
  - Grand Cross of the Wendish Crown, with Crown
  - 1870 Military Merit Cross (Schwerin)
- (Kingdom of Saxony) Saxony:
  - Knight of the Rue Crown
  - Commander of the Military Order of St. Henry, 1st Class
- Saxe-Weimar-Eisenach: Grand Cross of the White Falcon, 1888
- Schaumburg-Lippe: 1870 Military Merit Medal
- (Kingdom of Württemberg) Württemberg: Grand Cross of the Württemberg Crown, 1890
- Prussia:
  - Knight of the Black Eagle 19 September 1874
  - Grand Cross of the Red Eagle, with Swords
  - Pour le Mérite, 5 August 1915; with Oak Leaves, 25 July 1917
  - Iron Cross, 2nd and 1st Classes, 1870; Grand Cross, 4 March 1918
  - Grand Commander of the Royal House Order of Hohenzollern
  - War Commemorative Medal of 1870/71
  - Centenary Medal
  - Officers' Long Service Cross
  - Red Cross Medal, 1st class with War Decoration
- (Hohenzollern-Sigmaringen) Hohenzollern: Cross of Honour of the Princely House Order of Hohenzollern, 1st Class

=== Other countries ===
- Austria-Hungary:
  - Knight of the Golden Fleece, 1868
  - Grand Cross of St. Stephen, 1881
  - Grand Cross of the Military Order of Maria Theresa, 26 March 1918
  - Military Merit Cross, 1st Class with War Decoration
  - Large Military Merit Medal ("Signum Laudis")
  - Red Cross Decoration 1st Class with War Decoration
  - 1898 Franz Joseph I Jubilee Medal
  - 1908 Franz Joseph I Jubilee Cross in Gold
  - 1908 Franz Joseph I Military Jubilee Cross
- Belgium:
  - Order of Leoopold (Grand Cordon) (Belgium)
- (Kingdom of Italy) Italy: Knight of the Annunciation, 10 September 1897
- Luxembourg: Knight of the Gold Lion of Nassau
- (Kingdom of Montenegro) Montenegro: Grand Cross of the Order of Prince Danilo I
- Ottoman Empire:
  - Gold Imtiaz Medal, with Swords
  - Grand Commander of the Order of Glory
  - Turkish War Medal ("Gallipoli Star")
- (Kingdom of Portugal) Portugal: Grand Cross of the Tower and Sword
- (Kingdom of Romania) Romania: Grand Cross of the Star of Romania
- (Kingdom of Serbia) Serbia:
  - Grand Cross of the White Eagle
  - Grand Cross of the Cross of Takovo
- Spain: Grand Cross of the Order of Charles III, April 1876; with Collar, 1883
- United Kingdom: Honorary Knight Grand Cross of the Royal Victorian Order, 15 August 1907

The orders above which were from Allied nations were awarded prior to World War I.

== Ancestry ==
Ancestors of Prince Leopold of Bavaria

8. Maximilian I Joseph of Bavaria
4. Ludwig I of Bavaria
9. Princess Augusta Wilhelmine of Hesse-Darmstadt
2. Luitpold, Prince Regent of Bavaria
10. Frederick, Duke of Saxe-Altenburg
5. Princess Therese of Saxe-Hildburghausen
11. Duchess Charlotte Georgine of Mecklenburg-Strelitz
1. Prince Leopold of Bavaria
12. Ferdinand III, Grand Duke of Tuscany
6. Leopold II, Grand Duke of Tuscany
13. Princess Luisa of Naples and Sicily
3. Archduchess Auguste Ferdinande of Austria
14. Maximilian, Hereditary Prince of Saxony
7. Princess Maria Anna of Saxony
15. Princess Carolina of Parma

== Notes ==
Prince Leopold of Bavaria House of Wittelsbach Born: 9 March 1846 Died: 28 September 1930
Military offices
Preceded by Generalleutnant Hugo Ritter von Diehl	Commander, 1. Königlich Bayerische Division; 16 June 1881 – 3 March 1887	Succeeded by Generalleutnant Prince Arnulf of Bavaria
Preceded by General der Infanterie Karl Freiherr von Horn	Commander, I. Königlich Bayerisches Armeekorps; 3 March 1887 – 27 June 1892	Succeeded by Generaloberst Prince Arnulf of Bavaria
Preceded by Generalfeldmarschall Leonhard Graf von Blumenthal	Commander, IV Army Inspection; 27 June 1892 – 27 March 1913	Succeeded by Generalfeldmarschall Rupprecht, Crown Prince of Bavaria
Preceded by Generaloberst August von Mackensen	Commander, 9th Army; 17 April 1915 – 30 July 1916	Succeeded by Dissolved
Preceded by none	Commander, Heeresgruppe Prinz Leopold von Bayern; 5 August 1915 – 30 July 1916	Succeeded by Remus von Woyrsch
Preceded by Generalfeldmarschall Paul von Hindenburg	Oberbefehlshaber Ost; 29 August 1916 – 1918	Succeeded by Dissolved
