= Kollegstufe =

The Kollegstufe, Oberstufe or Sekundarstufe II is the German equivalent of the sixth form of secondary education in the upper stage (grades 12–13, or 11–12) of German high schools. Class groupings are dissolved and instead students choose an individual combination of courses.

The idea behind this concept is not to prepare students for university, where they have to create their own timetable, as is sometimes claimed based on the mere analogy. The idea is to allow students to diversify and pick subjects of their personal preference. The Kollegstufe does not yet allow students to specialize on one or very few subjects like the university does, so a complex set of rules for the Kollegstufe ensures that important subjects (e.g. mathematics, languages) cannot be dropped, a sufficient coverage for different fields of education is achieved and the number of lessons per week covers the required minimum. After finishing the Kollegstufe successfully, which means one complies with all regulations and passes the final exams, one gets the "Abiturzeugnis", formally called "Zeugnis der Allgemeinen Hochschulreife", which entitles one to attend a German university.

The regulations for the Kollegstufe and also for the Abitur are different in the different "Länder" (federal states) of Germany. As educational matters are decided by the governments of the federal states, these differences can be quite big.

== See also ==
- Abitur
- Education in Germany
- Gymnasium (school)
