= Mallinckrodt (surname) =

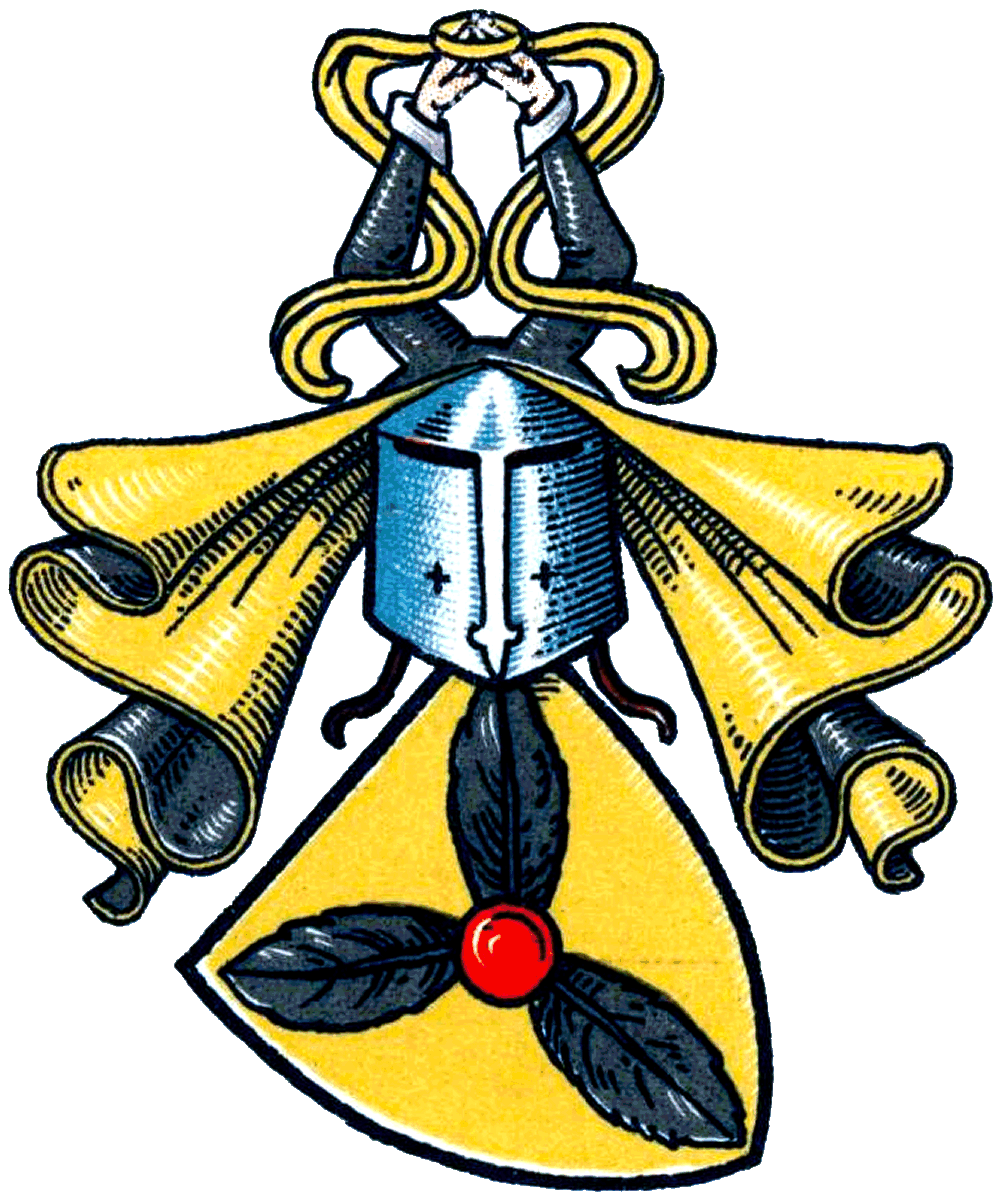
Coat of Arms of the Mallinckrodt family

The Mallinckrodt family is an old German noble family, originated from Burg Mallinckrodt in the County of Mark. It was first mentioned in 1241 with name of Ritter Ludwig de Mesekenwerke.

== Notable people ==
- Bernhard von Mallinckrodt (1591–1664), dean of Münster Cathedral
- Pauline von Mallinckrodt (1817–1881), German Catholic and foundress of the Sisters of Christian Charity
- Hermann von Mallinckrodt (1821–1874), German parliamentarian
- Friedrich von Mallinckrodt (1894–1941), German military pilot
- George von Mallinckrodt (1930–2021), German banker

== Fictional people ==
- Natalie von Mallinckrodt, character in Thomas Mann's 1924 novel The Magic Mountain
