= Sgurgola =

- Comune
- Comune di Sgurgola
- Location within Italy Location within Lazio
- Coordinates: 41°40′N 13°9′E
- Country: Italy
- Region: Lazio
- Province: Frosinone (FR)

Government
  - Mayor: Antonio Corsi

Area
  - Total: 19.22 km^{2} (7.42 sq mi)
- Elevation: 386 m (1,266 ft)

Population (31 December 2010)
  - Total: 2,709
  - Density: 140.9/km^{2} (365.1/sq mi)
- Demonym: Sgurgolani
- Time zone: UTC+1 (CET)
  - Summer (DST): UTC+2 (CEST)
- Postal code: 03010
- Dialing code: 0775
- Patron saint: St. Leonard
- Saint day: November 6
- Website: Official website

Sgurgola is a comune (municipality) in the Province of Frosinone in the Italian region Lazio, located about 60 kilometres (37 mi) southeast of Rome and about 15 kilometres (9 mi) west of Frosinone.

Sgurgola borders the following municipalities: Anagni, Ferentino, Gorga, Morolo.

== Geography ==
The historic centre of Sgurgola lies on a rocky limestone outcrop on the side of the Lepini Mountains. The town has an unimpeded view of the Sacco Valley, the surrounding landscape and towns. The municipality of Sgurgola adjoins with that of Gorga, Anagni and Morolo.

Sgurgola's territory is primarily set on the side of the mountain, with heights between 200 and 300 msml. The highest point of Sgurgola is marked at 407 mslm. The Colle Castello is at around 250mslm, Colle Cippo slightly lower, while Colle Capocroce is around 290 mslm.

The most southern part of Sgurgola's territory confines with the territory of Gorga, and has a mountainous aspect. Mount Rava Calvuccio reaches 946 meters. The lowest areas of the territory are found in the north-west, facing Anagni, and are used to cultivate vinyards and olive groves.

The Sacco River flows through the northern part of Sgurgola's territory, a tributary of the Liri River, where the strong flowing waters flow in a direction that runs from south to north.

== Origin of the Name Sgurgola ==
The name Sgurgola is derived from the Lombard word “sculca”, which means “look out”, which is clearly because of its dominant view of the surrounding territories.

Another theory proposes that the name, like that of Sgurgola's neighbour Gorga, is drawn from the verb “sgorgare”, that is to flow, like a mountain spring. This would also be appropriate taking into consideration the many mountain springs that are present in Sgurgola's territory.

== History ==
Legend has it that Sgurgola was founded by the Tharacian rebel gladiator Spartacus, who led the revolt of the slaves during the Third Servile War in 73-71 a.C. People had been living in the territory well before that time dating back to neolithic times. Most notably the territory around Sgurgola belonged to people of the Volsci tribe, a nomadic Italic tribe with strong agricultural skill and a warlike nature. The Volsci people fought the Romans for over 200 years before they were eventually subdued and assimilated by the Romans around 300b.C.

The Romans were active in the territory after that time, with a significant Roman country house being noted at Villa Magna at the base of the Lepini mountains, which was visited even by the Roman emperor Marcus Aurelius in his youth.

The settlement at Sgurgola really came into its own during the Barbarian Invasions of the 4th Century a.D., when populations of the surrounding towns sought refuge in Sgurgola owing to its protected vantage point above the Sacco Valley below.

The Papal State that followed the Roman empire instated feudal lords to rule over the territory. The territory was valuable in terms of its ability to provide revenue and produce destined for Rome. Anagni becoming a stronghold for the Papal State, and four Popes used Anagni to base a significant part of their reign. This period culminated in the rule of Pope Boniface VIII, who was born in Anagni to a nobel family and whose notorious interference in power and politics ultimately led to his downfall.

In 1300 Boniface VIII succeeded in manipulating the Conti family into the sale of the feifdom of Sgurgola to his nephew Pietro Caetani. The Pope installed his nephew as Lord of Sgurgola, although the new Caetani lord did not live in Sgurgola. In the summer of 1303 Pope Boniface VIII sent the physician and alchemist Arnaldo da Villanova to reside in Sgurgola, and it was here that he composed one of his most important work of the apocalypse, De mysterio cymbalorum Ecclesiae, in which he predicted the imminent arrival of the antichrist and the end of the world, and called for true evangelism and extolled the virtues of absolute poverty.

Many of the Lords of surrounding territories were afraid that the Pope intended to also usurp their territories for his own family. Boniface VIII had a hand in politics in greater Europe, particularly in France, Scotland and England where he was actively promoting Rome's interests. In 1303 Boniface VIII threatened to excommunicate Phillip IV of France, and as a result Phillip IV set in motion a plan to put the meddling Pope back in his place. He sent his men to organise a conspiracy to overthrow the Pope, gathering support from the displaced Lords of Sgurgola and the surrounding territories. The uprising against the Pope, called the “Anagni Slap”, one of the only times in history that a hand was raised against a Pope in power, took place in September 1303, and resulted in the Pope's removal to Rome and death a few weeks after the attack.

After this time the feudal lordship of Sgurgola continued, passing between a handful of powerful families (Conti, Caetani, Colonna) until feudalism was outlawed by the new Italian state after unification.

Sgurgola was one of the towns in southern Lazio involved in the violent acts of brigadage in the Papal state between 1860 and 1870. The coming of the railway in the mid-1800s opened Europe and the world to the region, and many Sgurgolani relocated to Rome and beyond seeking a better life. Those who remained continued to work the land, with the area being known for some of the best wine, table grapes and olive oil being sent throughout Europe by train. Many Sgurgolani worked for the railways, which became a traditional occupation for people from Sgurgola.

During WWII Sgurgola was occupied by the Fascists, although there was a strong and significant resistance from the local population. Cases were also reported in Sgurgola in connection to the mass rape, slaughter and torture of civilians by the Maroccan Gourmiers of the French foreign legion - termed the Marocchinate - in the days following the Allied victory at the Battle of Monte Cassino in May 1944. It is estimated there were over 60,000 victims of this brutal atrocity across the province of Frosinone with wide reaching cultural consequences for the population. The 1960 film Two Women (La Ciociara) starring Sophia Loren, was based on these events and earned Loren an Academy Award for her performance.

=== Symbols ===
The coat of arms for Sgurgola was recognised by government decree on the 4th July 1929.

== Monuments and Landmarks ==
- La Rocca (the ruins of the medieval Rocca fortress)
- Il bùcio pellíccio (the “hole in the sieve” quarter around the Rocca with its labyrinth of passageways)
- Il Muraglione (The Big Wall look out in Piazza Aringo with panoramic view of the Sacco Valley)
- Eremo di San Leonardo (Saint Leonard's Hermitage) A 13th Century church/retreat. Saint Leondard's Hermitage can be clearly seen halfway up the mountain to the south of Sgurgola, at 693 meters above sea level. It was constructed on the site of a previous monastery of Celestine Hermit Monks probably in the 13th century. To this day the church is the home of the venerated statue of Saint Leondard of Noblac (VI century French saint), who has been the patron saint of Sgurgola since the end of the 12th century. Near the hermitage a perennial spring flows, and nearby is the Fonte dell'Acero (Maple Fountain)
- Chiesetta di San Nicola (Saint Nicolas' Chaple) What remains of a white limestone church from the 13th Century, clearly seen on the mountainside directly above Sgurgola. Two stories, a cross vault, a side door and bezeled main door can still be seen. Next to the church there is a tunnel, through which winter a stream flows down into the village. San Nicola is an ideal starting point for excursions to explore the Lepini mountains, rich in forests, springs and caves.La Rocca (The ruins of the ancient Rocca fortress.)
- Fresco della chiesa Madonna del'aringo (Fresco from the now destroyed church of the Madonna del'aringo)
- Chiesa Santa Maria Assunta (Saint Mary of the Assumption Church)
- Chiesa San Giovanni Battista (Saint John the Baptist Church)
- Torre di Mola Colonna (The Colonna Mill Tower)
- Torre dell'Orologio (The Clock Tower)
- Cascate del fiume Sacco (The Sacco River Waterfalls)
- Fonte dell'Acero (The Maple Fountain)
- Fonte Capuani (The Capuani Spring)
- Fonte alla Caviglia
- Museo della Bande Musicali (Brass Band Museum) #Currently closed

== Society ==
=== Demographic evolution ===
According to census records, Sgurgolani numbered 2925 inhabitants in 1871. The population increased dramatically after unification reaching 4061 inhabitants in 1921. Today the population is around 2500 inhabitants.

=== Events ===
- Festa dell'Uva (Grape Festival) takes place over three days at the end of September and celebrates Sgurgola's ciociarian culture.
- Summer program of events in Sgurgola - during the summer period the main street of Sgurgola is closed to traffic and an extensive program of events take place to celebrate the season.
- Sagra del gnocchetti
- Sagra della sagna

== Infrastructure and Transport ==
=== Roads ===
The most relevant are:

- SP 145, which connects the village to its railway station.
- SP 227 of the Lepini Mountains, which connects Sgurgola to the neighbouring towns of Gorga and Morolo.

=== Railways ===
Sgurgola is serviced by the Sgurgola Train Station, on the regional train line Lazio FL&. It is an important railway link that interconnects the Roma-Cassino line and the high velocity Rome-Napoli AV/AC.

== Public Administration ==
In 1927, by decree of the fascist government of the day, Sgurgola became part of the newly created province of Frosinone. Previously Sgurgola had been part of the province of Rome.
