= Monte Semprevisa =

Mountain in Italy

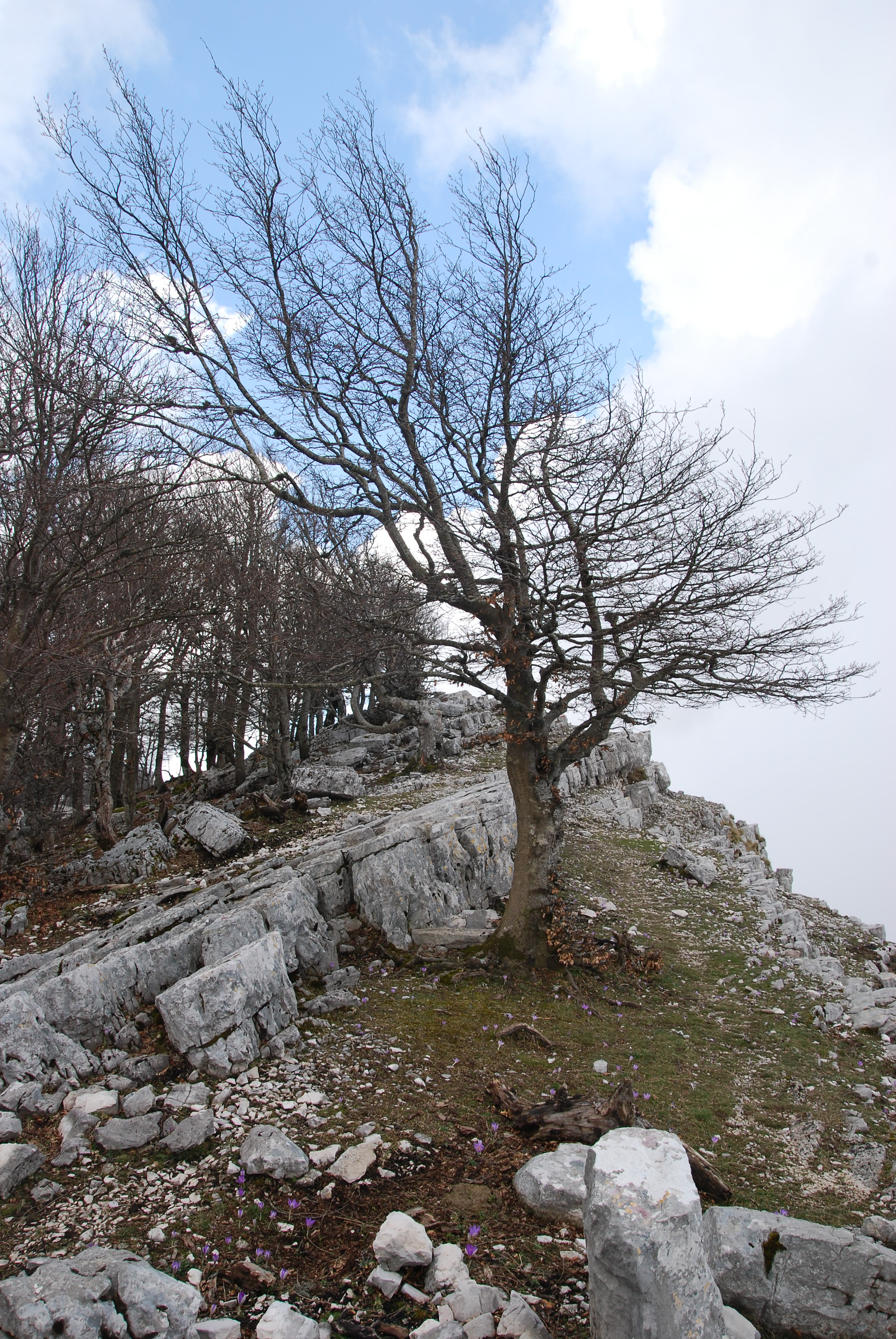

Highest point
- Elevation: 1,536 m (5,039 ft)
- Prominence: 1,231 m (4,039 ft)
- Listing: Ribu
- Coordinates: 41°34′N 13°05′E

Geography
- Location within Italy
- Location: Lazio, Italy
- Parent range: Monti Lepini

Monte Semprevisa is the highest peak in the Monti Lepini, in southern Lazio, central Italy. It has an elevation of 1,536 metres (5,039 ft).

It is located across the boundary of the provinces of Rome and Latina, in the territories of Carpineto Romano and Bassiano. Like most of the Lepini peaks, it is composed of limestone rocks.
