= Safara e Santo Aleixo da Restauração =

- Civil parish
- Location in Portugal
- Coordinates: 38.108°N 7.218°W
- Country: Portugal
- Region: Alentejo
- Intermunic. comm.: Baixo Alentejo
- District: Beja
- Municipality: Moura
- Disbanded: March 13, 2025

Area
  - Total: 237.20 km^{2} (91.58 sq mi)

Population (2011)
  - Total: 1,871
  - Density: 7.888/km^{2} (20.43/sq mi)
- Time zone: UTC+00:00 (WET)
  - Summer (DST): UTC+01:00 (WEST)

Safara e Santo Aleixo da Restauração was a civil parish in the municipality of Moura, Portugal. The population in 2011 was 1,871, in an area of 237.20 km^{2}. It was formed in 2013 by the merger of the former parishes Safara and Santo Aleixo da Restauração. It was dissolved in 2025.
