= Princess Adelaide of Savoy-Genoa =

Maria Adelaide
- Princess Leone Massimo of Arsoli
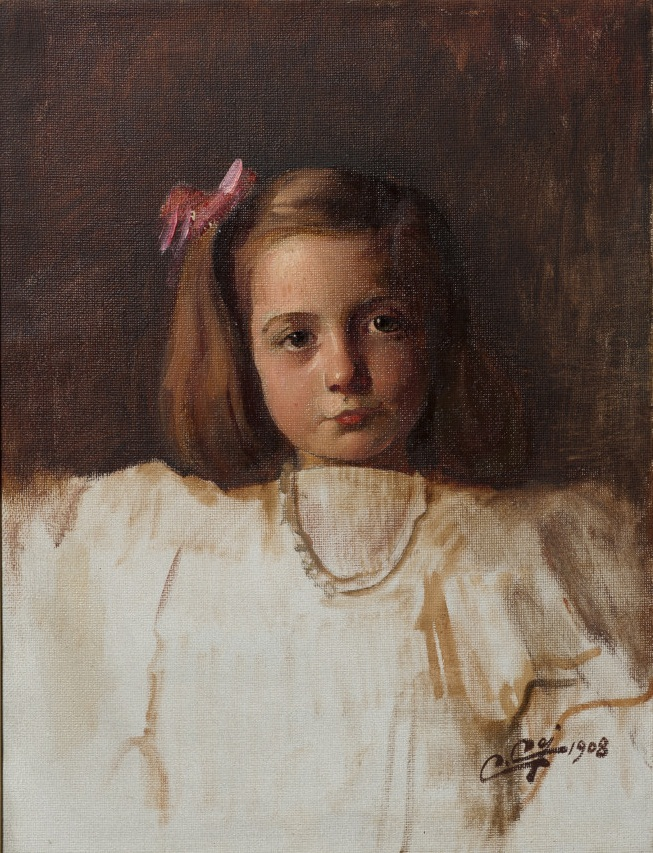
- Portrait c. 1908
- Born: 25 April 1904; Turin, Italy
- Died: 2 August 1979 (aged 75); Rome, Italy
- Spouse: Leone Massimo, Principe di Arsoli (m. 1935; died 1979)
- Issue: Isabella Massimo di Arsoli; Filippo Massimo di Arsoli; Ferdinando Massimo di Arsoli; Carlo Massimo di Arsoli; Maria Eleonora Massimo di Arsoli; Francesco Massimo di Arsoli
Names
- Italian: Maria Adelaide Vittoria Amelia
- House: Savoy-Genoa
- Father: Prince Thomas, Duke of Genoa
- Mother: Princess Isabella of Bavaria
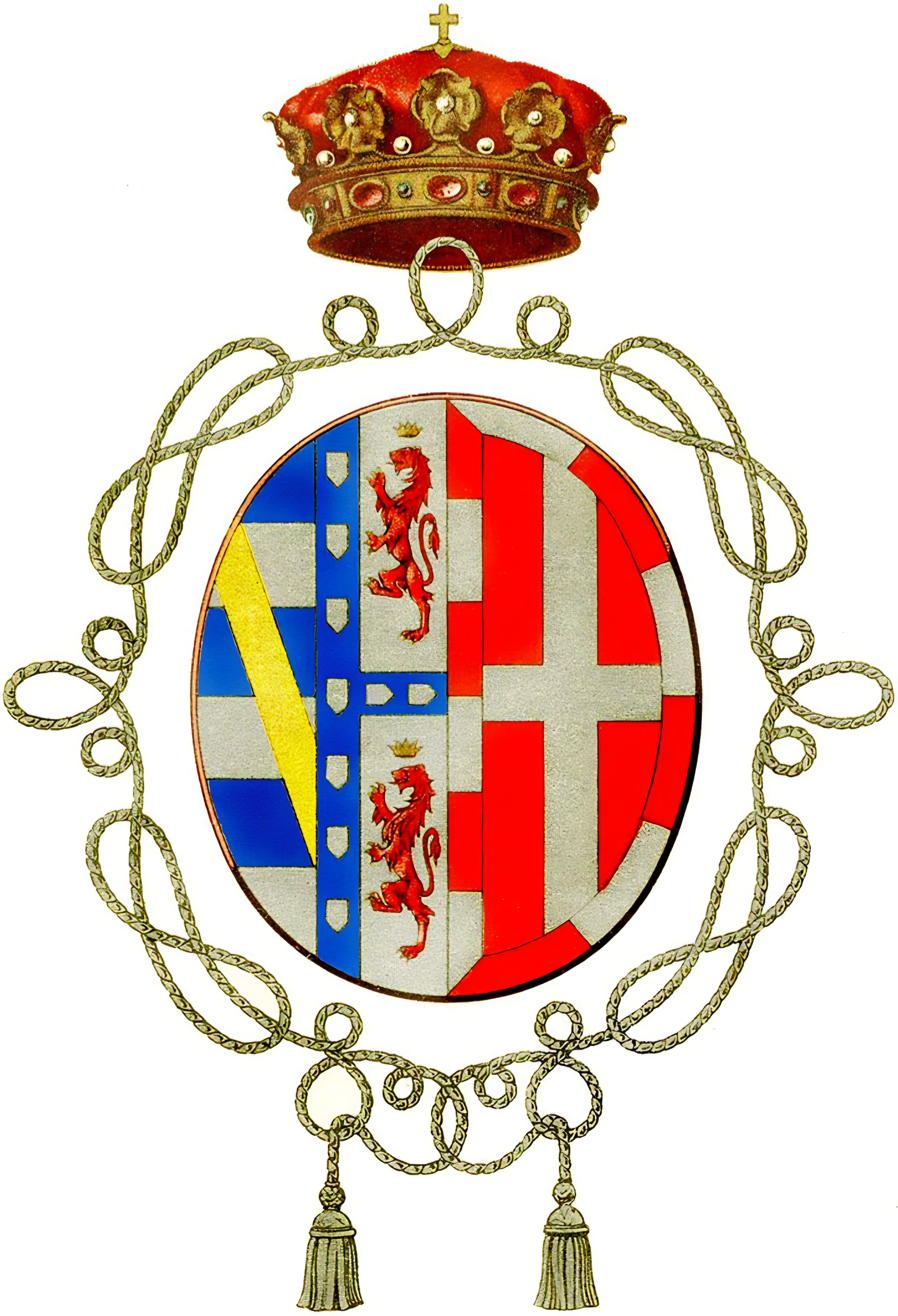
- Coat of arms Maria Adelaide of Savoy-Genoa

Princess Adelaide of Savoy-Genoa (Maria Adelaide Vittoria Amelia; 25 April 1904 – 2 August 1979), was a daughter of Prince Thomas, Duke of Genoa and Princess Isabella of Bavaria.

== Family and early life ==
Adelaide was the fifth of six children born to Prince Thomas, Duke of Genoa and his wife Princess Isabella of Bavaria. Her father was a grandson of King Charles Albert of Sardinia. Among her siblings were Ferdinando, 3rd Duke of Genoa; Filiberto, 4th Duke of Genoa; and Eugenio, 5th Duke of Genoa. Her mother Isabella was a granddaughter of King Ludwig I of Bavaria.

Through her aunt Margherita of Savoy, she was a cousin of King Victor Emmanuel III of Italy.

== Marriage ==
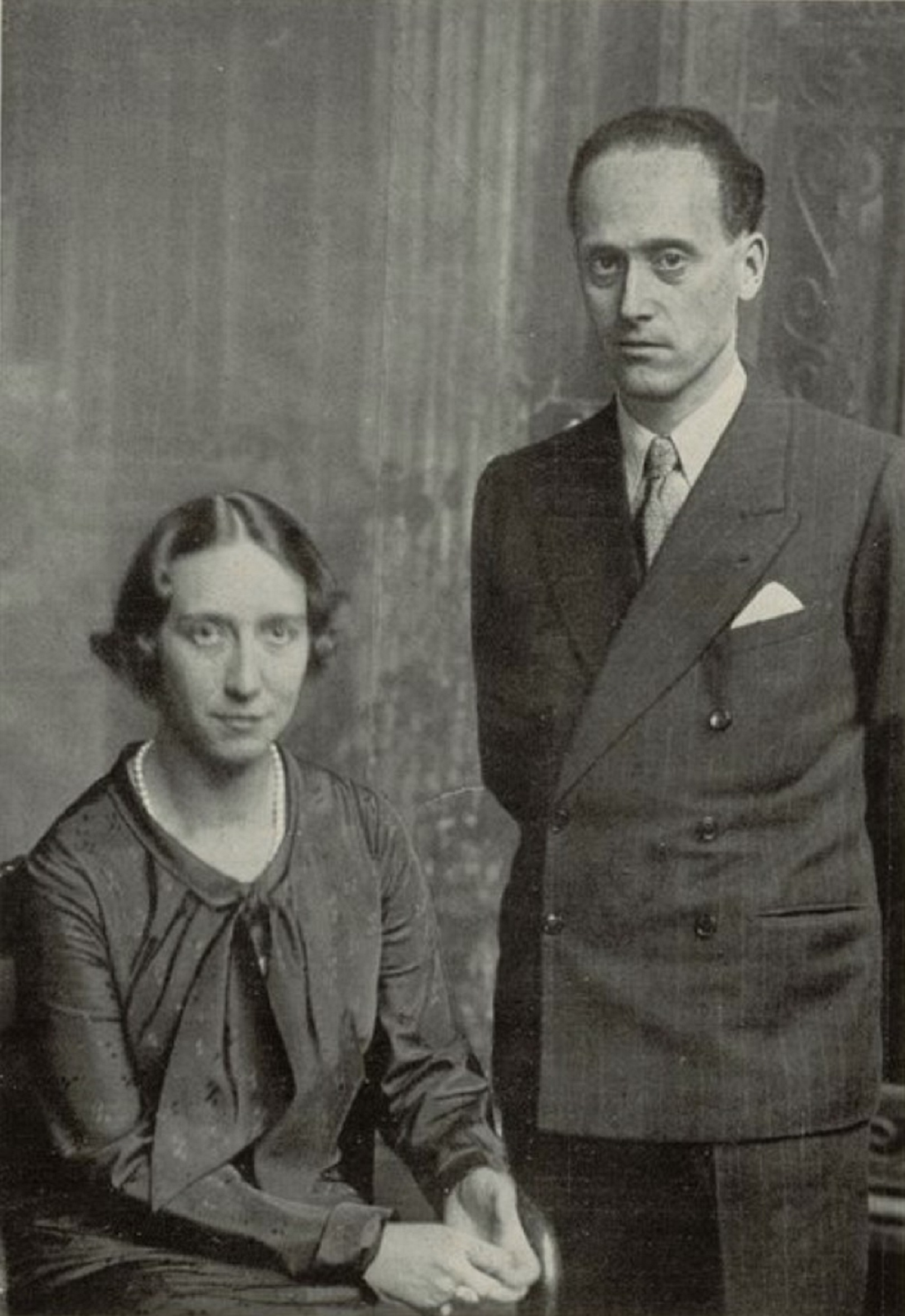
Princess Maria Adelaide with her husband

On 15 July 1935, she married her third cousin, Prince Leone Massimo, son of Camillo Francesco Massimo, 4th Principe di Arsoli and donna Eleonora Brancaccio. He was the 5th Prince of Arsoli, the 9th Marquis of Roccasecca, Baron of Pisterzo, Lord of Intrafiumara, Nobile of Tivoli and Velletri and 2nd Duke of Anticoli Corrado. Leone was also the great-grandson of Princess Caroline of Naples and Sicily and Princess Maria Gabriella of Savoy-Carignano. They had six children:

- Isabella Massimo (born 5 June 1936 in Rome), married on 4 October 1964 in Arsoli, Prince Francesco Maria di Carpegna Falconieri Gabrielli, Count of Carpegna (27 April 1924 in Rome – 25 May 2007 in Rome), son of Prince Ulderico Orazio di Carpegna Falconieri Gabrielli, Count of Carpegna, and donna Anna Maria Giusso del Galdo. They had four children:
  - Prince Antonio di Carpegna Falconieri Gabrielli, Count of Carpegna (born 23 August 1965 in Rome), married on 17 June 2006 in Tricase, Baroness Clara Polissena Winspeare Guicciardi (born 29 November 1966 in Klagenfurt), daughter of Baron Riccardo Carlo Winspeare Guicciardi and Princess Elisabeth of Liechtenstein. They have two children:
    - Elena di Carpegna Falconieri Gabrielli (born 18 October 2007 in Tricase)
    - Filippo di Carpegna Falconieri Gabrielli (born 2 September 2009 in Tricase)
  - Giovanni di Carpegna Falconieri Gabrielli, Count of Carpegna (born 19 December 1966 in Rome), married on 1 August 2015 in Orvieto, Paola Di Giacomo (born 7 March 1974 in Terni). They have one son:
    - Augusto Nicola di Carpegna Falconieri Gabrielli (born 4 November 2016 in Rome)
  - Tommaso di Carpegna Falconieri Gabrielli, Count of Carpegna (born 21 February 1968 in Rome), married on 14 June 1997 in Forte dei Marmi, Countess Anna Zileri Dal Verme degli Obbizi (born 21 July 1969 in Florence), daughter of Count Paolo Zileri Dal Verme degli Obizzi, and Nobile Lavinia Assettati. They have three children:
    - Livia di Carpegna Falconieri Gabrielli (born 21 September 1999 in Rome)
    - Sofia di Carpegna Falconieri Gabrielli (born 22 November 2001 in Rome)
    - Vittoria di Carpegna Falconieri Gabrielli (born 25 June 2005 in Rome)
  - Caterina di Carpegna Falconieri Gabrielli (born 23 August 1970 in Rome), married Nobile Guglielmo Masetti Zannini (born 4 November 1967 in Rome), son of Nobile Gianlodovico Masetti Zannini and donna Eleonora di Napoli Rampolla Barrese Bellacera
- Filippo Massimo, 6th Prince of Arsoli (born 29 September 1938 in Agliè), married on 4 April 1962 in Rome, Maria Luigia Capparella (born 15 August 1942 in Rome), daughter of Pietro Capparella. They have two children:
  - Fabrizio Massimo, 7th Prince of Arsoli, Prince of Triggiano and Roviano, Duke of Lustra (born 28 October 1963 in Rome), married in 1999, Ilaria Bottini (born 1967 or 1968), daughter of Giuseppe Bottini and Silvia Fontana. Divorced in 2002. They have three children, but Fabrizio also has one issue (Giacomo, son of Natalia Coppa Solari):
    - Marcantonio Massimo (born 10 December 1999 in Rome)
    - Barbara Massimo (born 10 December 1999 in Rome)
    - Olimpia Massimo (born November 2001 in Rome)
  - Barbara Massimo (born 4 June 1965 in Rome) married with don Scipione Prince Borghese 14th Prince of Sulmona
- Ferdinando Massimo (born 20 January 1940 in Rome), married on 4 June 1977 in Cefalù, Maresti Savona (born 1 October 1943 in Cefalù), daughter of Baldassarre Savona and Maria Cristina Catalfamo. They have two children:
  - Ascanio Massimo (born 25 July 1978 in Rome)
  - Lavinia Massimo (born 25 July 1978 in Rome), married on 7 July 2015 in Rome, Filippo Cammarano Guerritore di Ravello (born 1966)
- Carlo Massimo (born 3 July 1942 in Rome), married on 8 October 1989 in Rome, doña Elisa Osorio de Moscoso y Estanga (born 31 March 1946 in Madrid), daughter of Pedro Osorio de Moscoso, Duke of Montemar, and doña Elisa de Estanga y Cologan-Franchi
- Maria Eleonora Massimo (born 30 March 1944 in Rome), married on 7 October 1972 in Arsoli, Giuseppe Gustavo Ricci Paracciani Bergamini (born 7 February 1934 in Milan), son of Ugo Bergamini and Maria Amalia Lanza Manzanillo. They have one daughter:
  - Elena Ricci Paracciani Bergamini (born 30 July 1973 in Rome)
- Francesco Massimo (born 15 July 1946 in Rome), married on 16 July 1977 in Rome, Camillavelia Jacuzzi Ristori (born 29 January 1937 in Rome), daughter of Rodolfo Jacuzzi Ristori and Amalia Vinca

== Honours ==
- Dame of Honour and Devotion in the Sovereign Military Order of Malta
- Dame of Justice in the Sacred Military Constantinian Order of Saint George

== Ancestry ==
Ancestors of Princess Adelaide of Savoy-Genoa

8. Charles Albert of Sardinia
4. Prince Ferdinand, Duke of Genoa
9. Archduchess Maria Theresa of Austria
2. Prince Thomas, Duke of Genoa
10. John of Saxony
5. Princess Elisabeth of Saxony
11. Princess Amalie Auguste of Bavaria
1. Princess Maria Adelaide of Savoy-Genoa
12. Ludwig I of Bavaria
6. Prince Adalbert of Bavaria
13. Princess Therese of Saxe-Hildburghausen
3. Princess Isabella of Bavaria
14. Infante Francisco de Paula of Spain
7. Infanta Amalia of Spain
15. Princess Luisa Carlotta of the Two Sicilies
