= Camille de Tournon-Simiane =

French bureaucrat

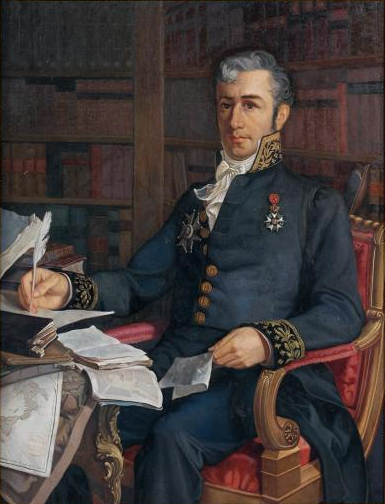
Portrait of Camille de Tournon-Simiane

Comte (Philippe-Marcellin) Camille de Tournon-Simiane (1778 – 18 June 1833) was a French bureaucrat, a chambellan of Napoleon I who served the Emperor as Prefect of Rome (6 September 1809 – 19 January 1814), and with the Bourbon Restoration served as Prefect of the Gironde at Bordeaux (25 July 1815 – 4 February 1822) and briefly of the Rhône at Lyon (1822 – January 1823).

== Biography ==
Born at Apt, Vaucluse, he was at first intended for the navy, but the Revolution intervened. He emigrated and after his return devoted seven years to polishing his interrupted studies, beginning his public career modestly in 1802 as secretary to the commission that was charged with working out the Napoleonic Code rural. As an auditeur to the Council of State, 1806, he was sent to the Département du Rhin, which was being reorganized as a department integral to France. Refusing to desert his post with the Austrian advances of 1809 he was taken prisoner (11 June) and transported to Hungary; after two months he was released and presented at Schönbrunn to Napoleon, who charged him with presenting a dossier on the Habsburg strengths. On the basis of the swiftly accomplished report he was made Prefect of Rome (6 September).

In the absence of the Pope, the Papal States had been incorporated as an integral part of France. By a decree of the Emperor, 1811, one million francs were provided to finance excavation and conservation works at Rome, of which Tournon-Simiane was in charge. Conservation works in the Roman forums from the Campidoglio to the Colosseum, were published in his Etudes Statistiques, 1831, in which he provided an account of the aims and scope of excavations undertaken during his administration, contrasting it with the wholesale pillaging that had taken place in 1798, under the terms of the Treaty of Tolentino.

The most spectacular changes removed 4 metres of silt from the Forum Romanum, taking the profile down to the level of the Via Sacra. Medieval houses that encroached on the forum site were purchased and demolished. So was the convent of Santa Francesca Romana, and structures were detached from the Arch of Titus. The Temple of Castor and Pollux was cleared to the top of its podium, and 60,000 cubic metres of earth was removed from the Basilica of Maxentius, known as the "Temple of Peace", exposing its ancient pavement and portico. A volume of fully 10 metres depth of earth was removed from the three columns of Vespasian's Temple of Jupiter Tonans. Broadly speaking, the Forum recognized in Piranesi's etchings was transformed to the forum we know today. After the restoration of Pius VII Giuseppe Camporese and the architect Giuseppe Valadier continued the path laid down by Tournon.

In 1811, he married Adèle Mayneaud de Pancemont, who brought as dowry the Château de Croix, Génelard in Saône-et-Loire.

Forced to withdraw from Rome when it was occupied by Neapolitan forces, he took with him the archives of his prefecture, from which he compiled his lasting work, Etudes statistiques sur Rome et la partie occidentale des états Romains.

In the meantime, as he had refused to join Napoleon for the Hundred Days, he was rewarded by Louis XVIII with the appointment as prefect of the Gironde where he served six years, and then, briefly at Lyon, as prefect of the Rhône. In January 1823 he was made a member of the Council of state, served in the upper chamber of the Assemblée and was made a peer of France at the end of 1823.

He died in the Hôtel de Pancemont, 57 rue de l’Arcade, Paris, which he had inherited from his father-in-law.
