= Supino =

- Comune
- Comune di Supino
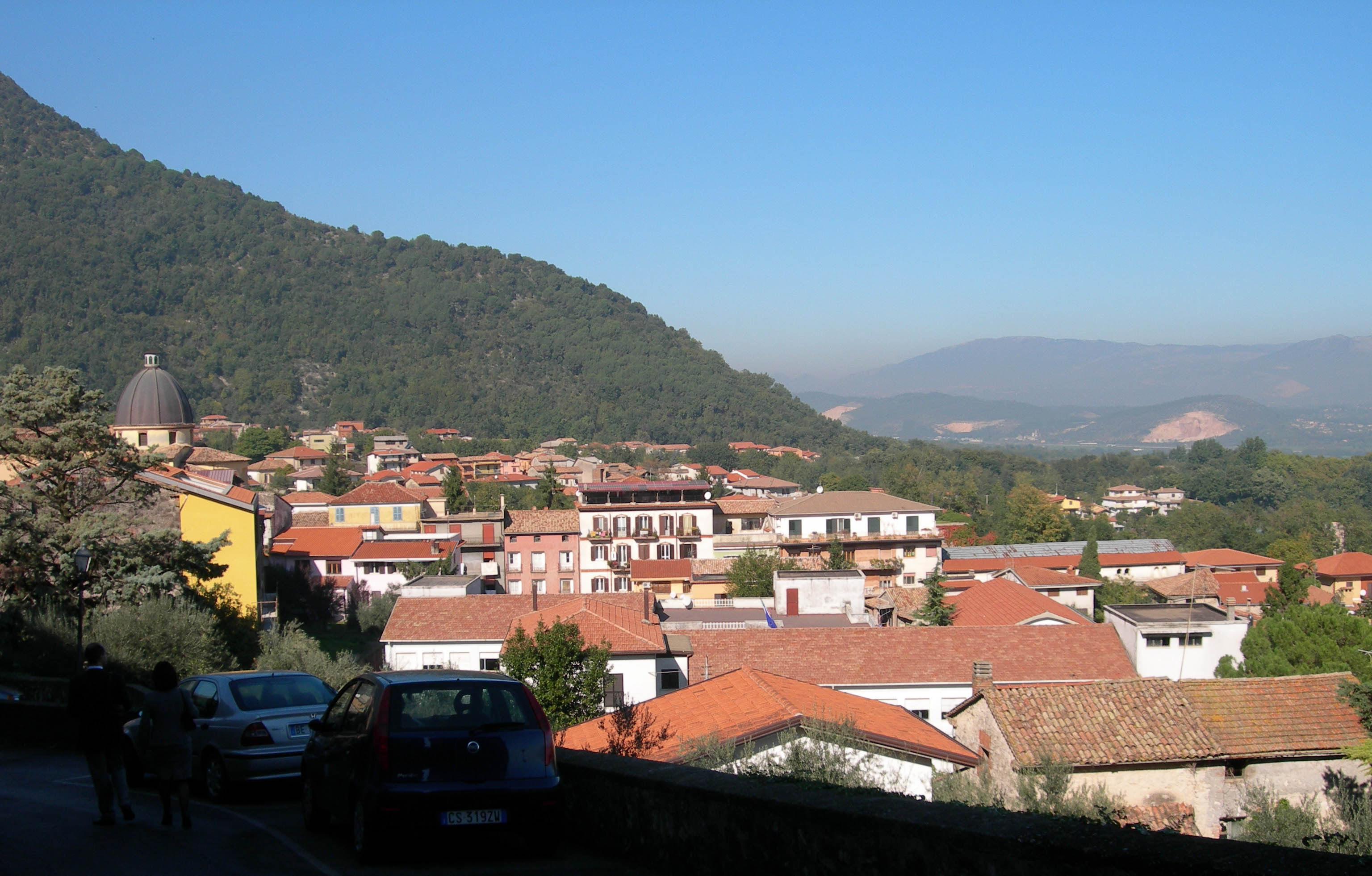
- View of Supino

- Location within Italy Location within Lazio
- Coordinates: 41°37′N 13°14′E
- Country: Italy
- Region: Lazio
- Province: Frosinone (FR)

Government
  - Mayor: Gianfranco Barletta

Area
  - Total: 35.59 km^{2} (13.74 sq mi)
- Elevation: 321 m (1,053 ft)

Population (30 November 2019)
  - Total: 4,795
  - Density: 134.7/km^{2} (348.9/sq mi)
- Demonym: Supinesi
- Time zone: UTC+1 (CET)
  - Summer (DST): UTC+2 (CEST)
- Postal code: 03019
- Dialing code: 0775
- Patron saint: Saint Lawrence = August 10th
- Website: Official website

Supino is a comune (municipality) in the Province of Frosinone in the Italian region Lazio, located about 70 kilometres (43 mi) southeast of Rome and about 10 kilometres (6 mi) west of Frosinone.

Supino borders the following municipalities: Carpineto Romano, Ferentino, Frosinone, Giuliano di Roma, Gorga, Maenza, Morolo, Patrica. This small town is located on the slopes of the Monti Lepini, at the foot of Monte Gemma (1457 m) and overlooks the Sacco river valley.
