= Gorga, Lazio =

Gorga
- Comune
- Comune di Gorga
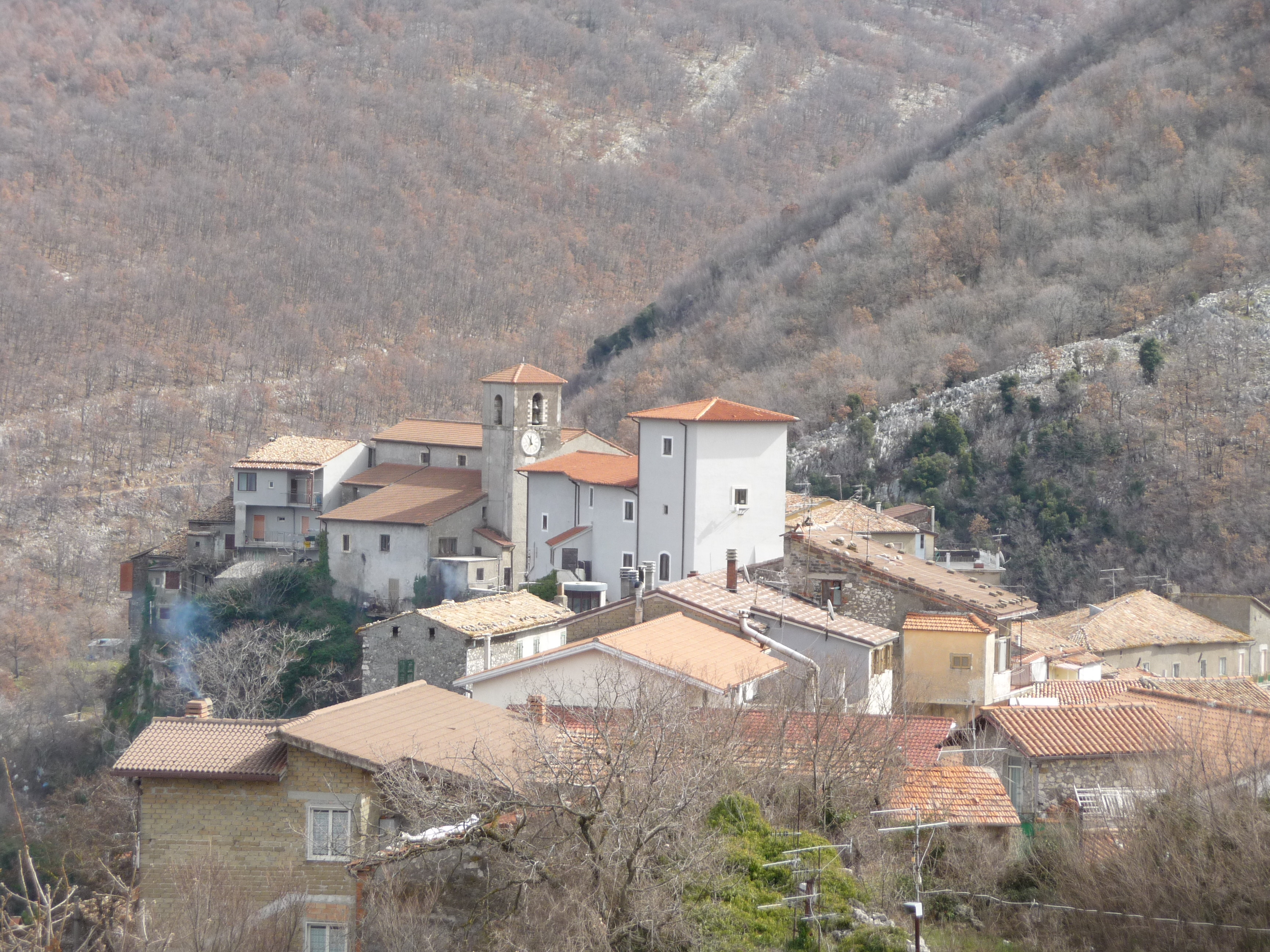
- View of Gorga, Lazio

- Gorga within the Metropolitan City of Rome

- Location within Italy Location within Lazio
- Coordinates: 41°39′N 13°7′E
- Country: Italy
- Region: Lazio
- Metropolitan city: Rome (RM)

Government
  - Mayor: Andrea Lepri

Area
  - Total: 26.3 km^{2} (10.2 sq mi)
- Elevation: 766 m (2,513 ft)

Population (31 August 2017)
  - Total: 712
  - Density: 27.1/km^{2} (70.1/sq mi)
- Demonym: Gorgani
- Time zone: UTC+1 (CET)
  - Summer (DST): UTC+2 (CEST)
- Postal code: 00030
- Dialing code: 06
- Website: Official website

Gorga is a comune (municipality) in the Metropolitan City of Rome in the Italian region Lazio, located about 60 kilometres (37 mi) southeast of Rome.

== Geography ==
Gorga borders the following municipalities: Anagni, Carpineto Romano, Montelanico, Morolo, Sgurgola, Supino.
