= Rome (department) =

Rome under the First French Empire

Département de Rome
- department of the First French Empire
- 1809–1814
- Location of Rome in France (1812)
- Capital: Rome
- Area
  - Coordinates: 41°54′N 12°30′E
  - 1812: 3,676.6 km^{2} (1,419.5 sq mi)
- Population
  - 1812: 586,000
- History
  - Annexation from the Papal States: 17 May 1809
  - Name changed from Tibre to Rome: 17 February 1810
  - Treaty of Paris: 1814
- Political subdivisions: 6 arrondissements
Preceded by	Succeeded by
Papal States	Papal States

Rome (French: [ʁɔm]) was a department of the First French Empire in present-day Italy. Its capital was Rome. It was formed on 17 May 1809, when most of the Papal States were annexed by France, and was first known as Tibre (after the Tiber river) before being renamed on 17 February 1810. Following the conquest of the Eternal City, Napoleon granted to his son Napoleon II the title of the King of Rome.

The department was disbanded after the defeat of Napoleon in 1814. At the Congress of Vienna, the Papal States were restored to Pius VII. Its territory corresponds approximately to the modern Italian region of Lazio.

== Subdivisions ==
Coat of arms of the city of Rome under the French Empire

The department was subdivided into the following arrondissements and cantons (situation in 1812):

- Rome; cantons: Bracciano, Civitavecchia, Frascati, Marino, Morlupo and Rome (9 cantons).
- Frosinone; cantons: Alatri, Anagni, Ceccano, Ceprano, Ferentino, Filettino, Frosinone, Guarcino, Monte San Giovanni, Prossedi, Ripi, Supino, Vallecorsa and Veroli.
- Rieti; cantons: Canemorto, Castelvecchio, Magliano, Monteleone, Narni, Poggio Mirteto, Rieti, Stroncone and Torri.
- Tivoli; cantons: Anticoli, Monterotondo, Olevano, Palestrina, Palombara, Subiaco, Tivoli, Vicovaro.
- Velletri; cantons: Albano, Cori, Genzano, Paliano, Piperno, Segni, Sermoneta, Sezze, Terracina, Valmontone and Velletri.
- Viterbo; cantons: Bagnorea, Canino, Caprarola, Civita Castellana, Corneto, Montefiascone, Orte, Ronciglione, Sant'Oreste, Soriano, Toscanella, Valentano, Vetralla, Vignanello and Viterbo.
