= Maenza =

- Comune
- Comune di Maenza
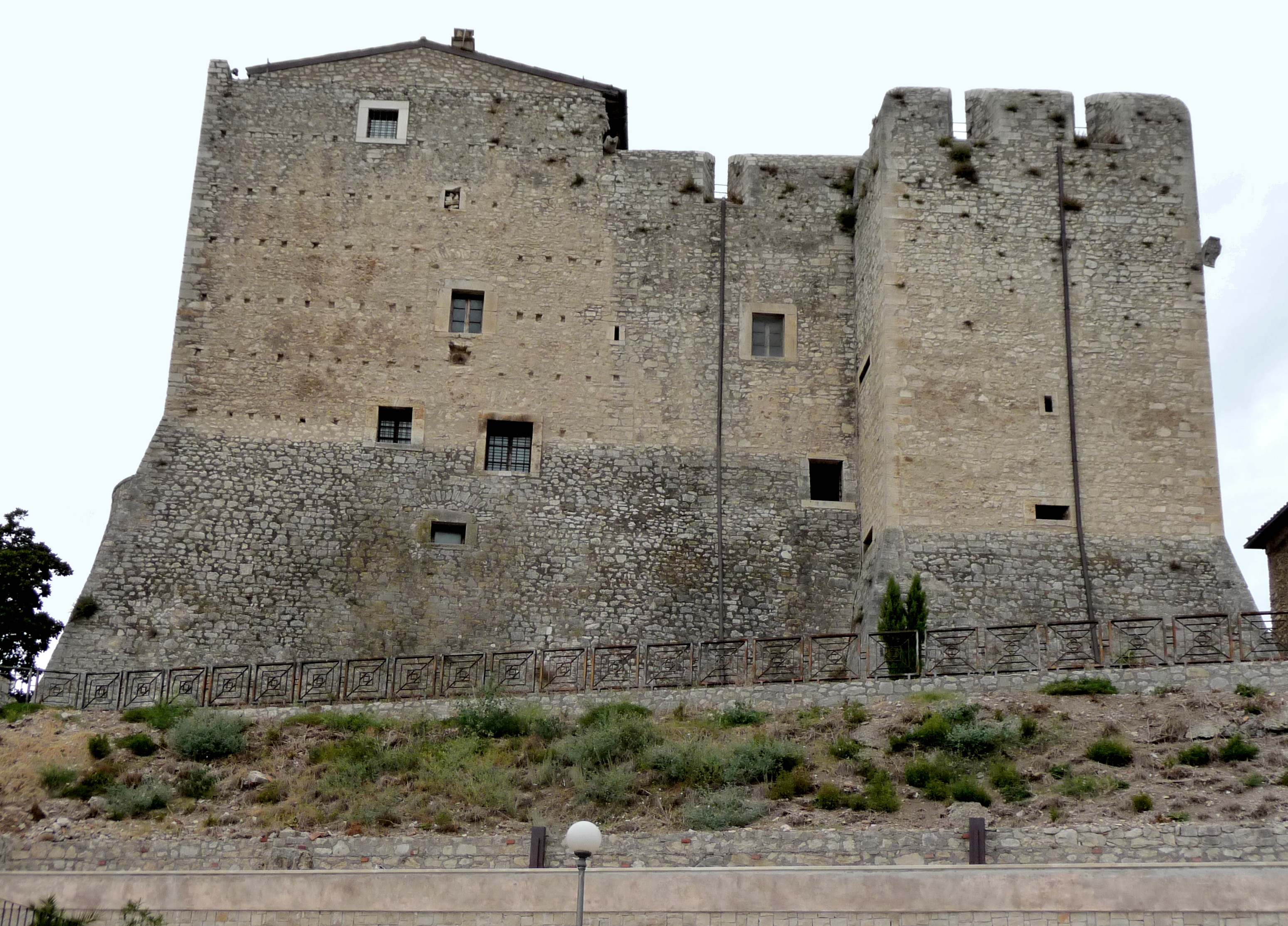
- Baronial castle (rocca)

- Coat of arms

- Location within Italy Location within Lazio
- Coordinates: 41°31′23″N 13°10′56″E
- Country: Italy
- Region: Lazio
- Province: Latina (LT)
- Frazioni: Farneto, Monte Acuto

Government
  - Mayor: Claudio Sperduti

Area
  - Total: 42.13 km^{2} (16.27 sq mi)
- Elevation: 358 m (1,175 ft)

Population (28 February 2017)
  - Total: 3,101
  - Density: 73.61/km^{2} (190.6/sq mi)
- Demonym: Maentini
- Time zone: UTC+1 (CET)
  - Summer (DST): UTC+2 (CEST)
- Postal code: 04010
- Dialing code: 0773
- Patron saint: Sant'Eleuterio
- Saint day: May 29
- Website: Official website

Maenza is a comune (municipality) in the Province of Latina in the Italian region Lazio, located about 70 km (43 mi) southeast of Rome and about 25 km (16 mi) east of Latina. It is home to a castle, originally built as a watchtower in the 12th–13th centuries, and enlarged in the 16th century. In an effort to bring in new residents, it is selling abandoned houses for €1 if buyers commit to renovations.

Maenza borders the following municipalities: Carpineto Romano, Giuliano di Roma, Priverno, Prossedi, Roccagorga, and Supino.

== History ==
When the ancient Volsci city of Privernum (Ita: Priverno) was destroyed by Saracen raids in the 9th century A.D., the city's population was dispersed and merged with groups of Germanic peoples who had entered Italy at the fall of the Western Roman Empire.

These new integrated populations would not fit within the walls of the old city of Priverno, so they populated a number of new towns, of which Maenza was one. The names of many of the leading aristocratic families show the influence of the Germanic newcomers to the area.

For most of its history, like dozens of towns in central Italy, Maenza alternated between being under the feudal lords of strong aristocratic families and being a part of the Papal States. The town lost its status as a comune in 1928 (being attached to Priverno instead), but its status as a comune was restored in 1947.
