= Patrica =

- Comune
- Comune di Patrica
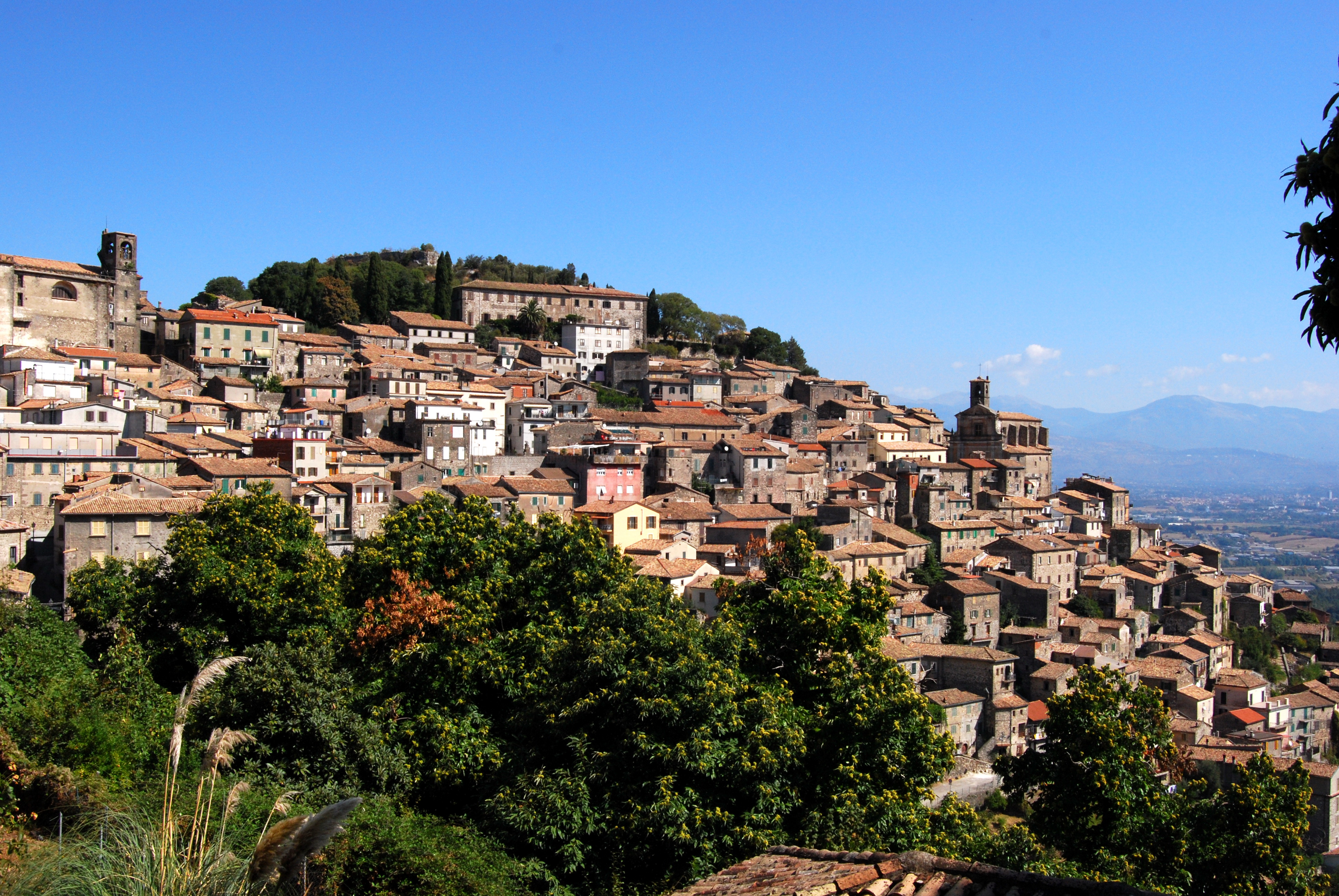
- View of Patrica

- Location within Italy Location within Lazio
- Coordinates: 41°35′N 13°15′E
- Country: Italy
- Region: Lazio
- Province: Frosinone (FR)

Government
  - Mayor: Lucio Fiordaliso

Area
  - Total: 27.31 km^{2} (10.54 sq mi)
- Elevation: 450 m (1,480 ft)

Population (30 November 2016)
  - Total: 3,176
  - Density: 116.3/km^{2} (301.2/sq mi)
- Demonym: Patricani
- Time zone: UTC+1 (CET)
  - Summer (DST): UTC+2 (CEST)
- Postal code: 03010
- Dialing code: 0775
- Patron saint: San Rocco
- Saint day: August 16
- Website: Official website

Patrica is a hill-top comune (municipality) in the Province of Frosinone in the Italian region Lazio.

== Territory ==
The town is located about 70 kilometres (43 mi) southeast of Rome and about 10 kilometres (6 mi) southwest of Frosinone. It is at 450 m MSL on a hill that rises, close to the Lepini Mountains, in a dominant position and overlooks the Sacco Valley. The territory of the comune borders Ceccano, Frosinone (the capital of the province), Giuliano di Roma, and Supino.

== History ==
The origins of the town are not well-known. Shortly before the Roman expansion, the surrounding region was inhabited by Italic peoples speaking Osco-Umbrian languages. The Romans called it Patricum. Their presence is attested by aqueduct ruins in the area. Numerous patrician villas which were located below the town.

In the Middle Ages and in the modern era, it was part of the Papal State, sharing the historical events of Rome, thus becoming part of the Kingdom of Italy in 1870.

During the 20th century, many residents emigrated from Patrica to Aliquippa, Pennsylvania, in the United States, to work in the steel mills; J&L in Aliquippa. They also emigrated to Ambridge which is just across the Ohio River from Aliquippa to work in the mills in and around Ambridge as well as at J&L; American Bridge, Wycoff, A.M. Byers, Bethlehem Steel, etc. The Italian community there continues to celebrate each August the Feast of San Rocco, patron saint of Patrica.

== Mount Cacume ==
Mount "Cacume" (derived from the Latin cacumen for top, or peak), is mentioned in Canto IV of Dante's ’’Purgatory’’: Mondazi in Bismantova e iu Cacume, and lies just southwest of the town. In 1903, a 14-metre (46 ft) high, 400-tonne (400,000 kg) cross was erected on the top of the mountain.
