= Prossedi =

- Comune
- Comune di Prossedi
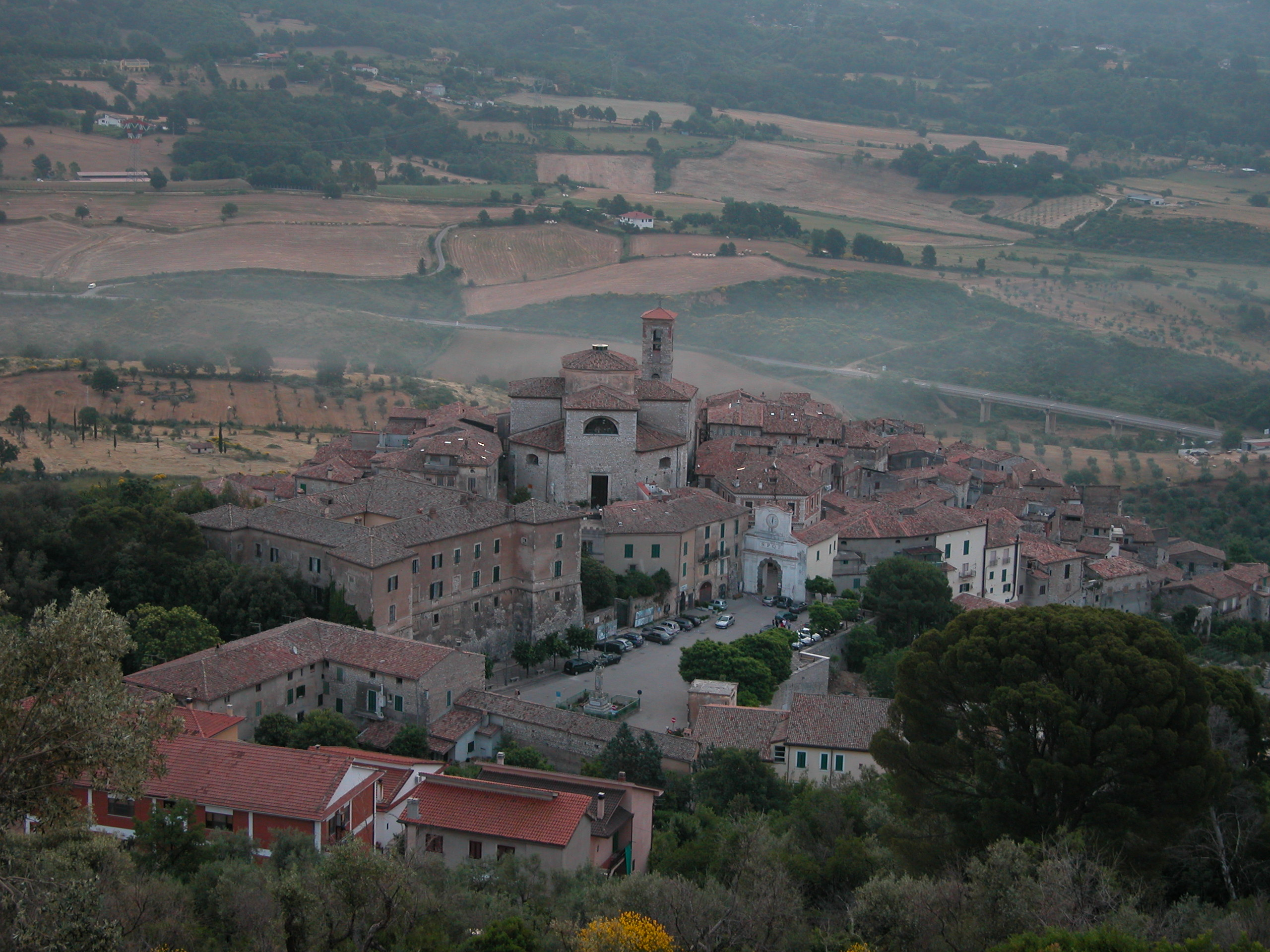
- View of Prossedi

- Coat of arms

- Location within Italy Location within Lazio
- Coordinates: 41°31′N 13°16′E
- Country: Italy
- Region: Lazio
- Province: Latina (LT)
- Frazioni: Pisterzo

Government
  - Mayor: Angelo Pincivero

Area
  - Total: 35.37 km^{2} (13.66 sq mi)
- Elevation: 206 m (676 ft)

Population (31 May 2022)
  - Total: 1,152
  - Density: 32.57/km^{2} (84.36/sq mi)
- Demonym: Prossedani
- Time zone: UTC+1 (CET)
  - Summer (DST): UTC+2 (CEST)
- Postal code: 04010
- Dialing code: 0773
- Patron saint: St. Agatha
- Saint day: Last Sunday in May
- Website: Official website

Prossedi (locally Prussedi) is a comune (municipality) in the province of Latina in the Italian region Lazio, located about 80 kilometres (50 mi) southeast of Rome and about 30 kilometres (19 mi) east of Latina.

Prossedi borders the following municipalities: Amaseno, Giuliano di Roma, Maenza, Priverno, Roccasecca dei Volsci, Villa Santo Stefano.

The village was founded by refugees from the destruction of Priverno in the 7th century. It was a possession of several baronial families, including the Chigi and the Conti. The most notable feature is the Romanesque church of San Nicola.
