= Santi Leonardo e Erasmo, Roccagorga =

Building in Roccagorga, Italy

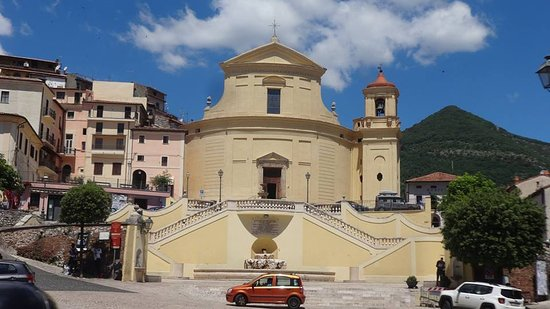
Chiesa-di-sn-leonardo.jpg

Santi Leonardo e Erasmo is a Baroque-style, Roman Catholic church located in Roccagorga, province of Latina, region of Lazio, central Italy. Presumbably, the church is dedicated in part to St Erasmus, former bishop of Formia, a port in the province of Latina. It overlooks the Piazza VI Gennaio

== History ==
A church dedicated to Santa Maria present at this site, when in 1500, a building of this general layout was built. The ancient church of Santa Maria was replaced by the present sacristy. It underwent refurbishment in a Baroque style between 1671 and 1700. The present late-Baroque structure was built after church was damaged during an earthquake in 1753, and collapsed on 23 December, 1769; the architect Paolo Posi designed the layout completed in 1775. In 1798, Napoleonic troops stripped the church of much of its silver and gold decoration; sparing the bust of San Erasmo. The church was reconsecrated on 23 October 1807.

The main nave is lined with thick pilasters. Only two of the altarpieces remain, out of the six that originally that graced the main and chapel altars. Four were stolen on 11 September 1989. The main altar is made from polychrome marble with a ciborium shaped like a Tempietto. The Chapel of Santa Orsola was erected in 1780 by the patron Cardinal Domenico Orsini d'Aragona.
