= Santo Aleixo da Restauração =

- Civil parish
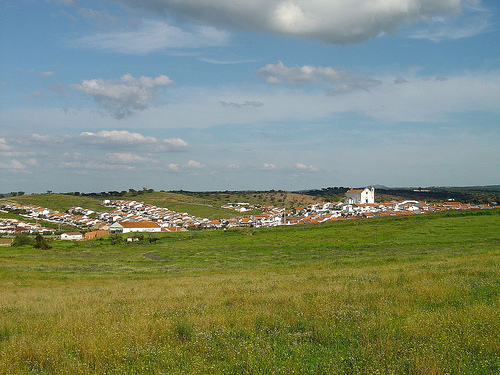
- A view of the main village of Santo Aleixo
- Interactive map of Santo Aleixo da Restauração
- Coordinates: 38°3′39″N 7°6′24″W
- Country: Portugal
- Region: Alentejo
- Intermunic. comm.: Baixo Alentejo
- District: Beja
- Municipality: Moura
- Elevation: 318 m (1,043 ft)

Population (2011)
  - Total: 812
- Time zone: UTC+00:00 (WET)
  - Summer (DST): UTC+01:00 (WEST)
- Postal code: 7875-175
- Area code: 285
- Patron: Santo Aleixo

Santo Aleixo da Restauração is a civil parish in the municipality of Moura, southern Portugal, along the Portuguese-Spanish border. In 2013, the parish merged into the parish Safara e Santo Aleixo da Restauração. It was restored in 2025.

== History ==
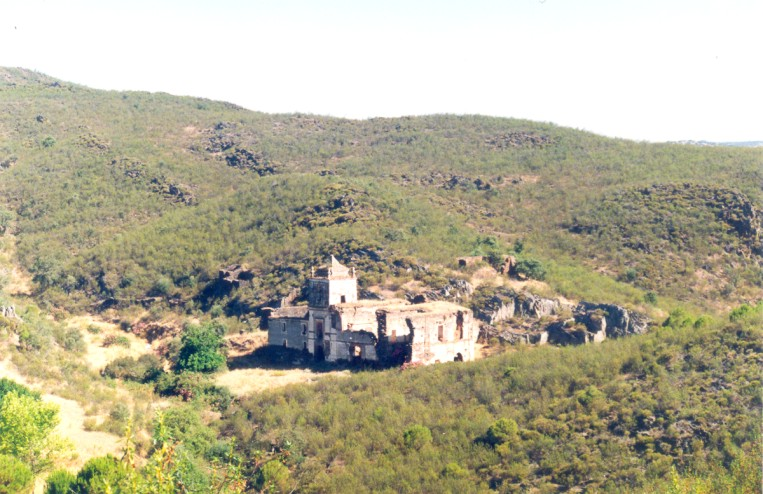
The abandoned ruins of the Convent of Tomina, in a secluded valley

Much of the history of Santo Aleixo da Restauração has been lost over time, but its origins have been fixed to a period around 4000-3000 B.C., from the existence of prehistoric dolmens and menhirs scattered in the region. Further, remnants from the Paleolithic and Neolithic periods encountered within the territory of Moura presuppose a human occupation to a primordial period of settlement.

In 1252, the region was actually called Campo de Gamos, and occupied by farmers and resident serfs from the areas of Moura and Noudar.

It was only on 3 May 1957 that the parish began to be called Santo Aleixo da Restauração, a toponymy derived from the fact it was considered a historical place during the patriotic Restoration War between Portugal and Spain.

== Geography ==
Santo Aleixo is located 27 kilometres from the municipal seat of Moura, on the Portuguese border with Spain.

The 2001 census indicated a population of 842 inhabitants, one of the parishes with great mobility, owing to a small younger population.

In addition to its local town council (Portuguese: junta de freguesia), Santo Alexio is supported by several infrastructures that include: the Casa do Povo, a primary school (EB1/2 Santo Aleixo da Restauração), postal stations, pharmacy, medical centre, parochial and social centre, the Arlindo Caldeira culture centre and funeral home.

== Economy ==
Agriculture (in particular olive cultivation) and pastoral herding, are the primary sources of income in this region, supported by an arts and crafts sector that retains many of the traditional activities of the parish (such as embroidery, knitting, cobblers and wood furniture).

== Architecture ==
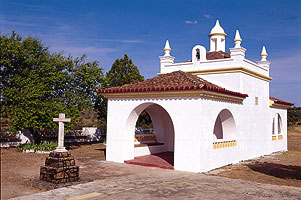
The hermitage of Santo António in Santo Aleixo

With a long history, Santo Aleixo da Restauração conserves many of the monuments constructed over its existence, including the parochial churches, the Convent da Tomina (in ruins), obelisks, dolmens, fountains and chapels:

=== Prehistoric ===
- Dolmens of Herdade da Negrita (Portuguese: Galeria Dolménica de Herdade da Negrita/Pedra das Antas e Antas das Pedras Tanchadas)

=== Civic ===
- Barracks of the Fiscal Guard of Santo Aleixo (Portuguese: Posto do Guarda Fiscal de Santo Aleixo)
- Estate of Herdade da Negrita (Portuguese: Herdade da Negrita/Monte da Negrita)
- Post of the Fiscal Guard of Ferrenha (Portuguese: Posto do Guarda Fiscal de Ferrenha)
- Post of the Fiscal Guard of Vale de Melhão (Portuguese: Posto do Guarda Fiscal de Vale de Melhão)

=== Religious ===
- Church of Santo Aleixo (Portuguese: Igreja Paroquial de Santo Aleixo da Restauração/Igreja de Santo Aleixo)
- Convent (Ruins) of Tomina (Portuguese: Ruinas do Convento de Tomina)

== Culture ==
A primary focus of local culture is the musical group "Os Restauradores".

Annually, the parish celebrates several religious and secular festivals (Portuguese: festas), including the Festa de Santo António (first Sunday of May), the Festa de Santo Aleixo (17 July) and the Festa da Tomina (last Sunday of August).
