= Roccagorga =

- Comune
- Comune di Roccagorga
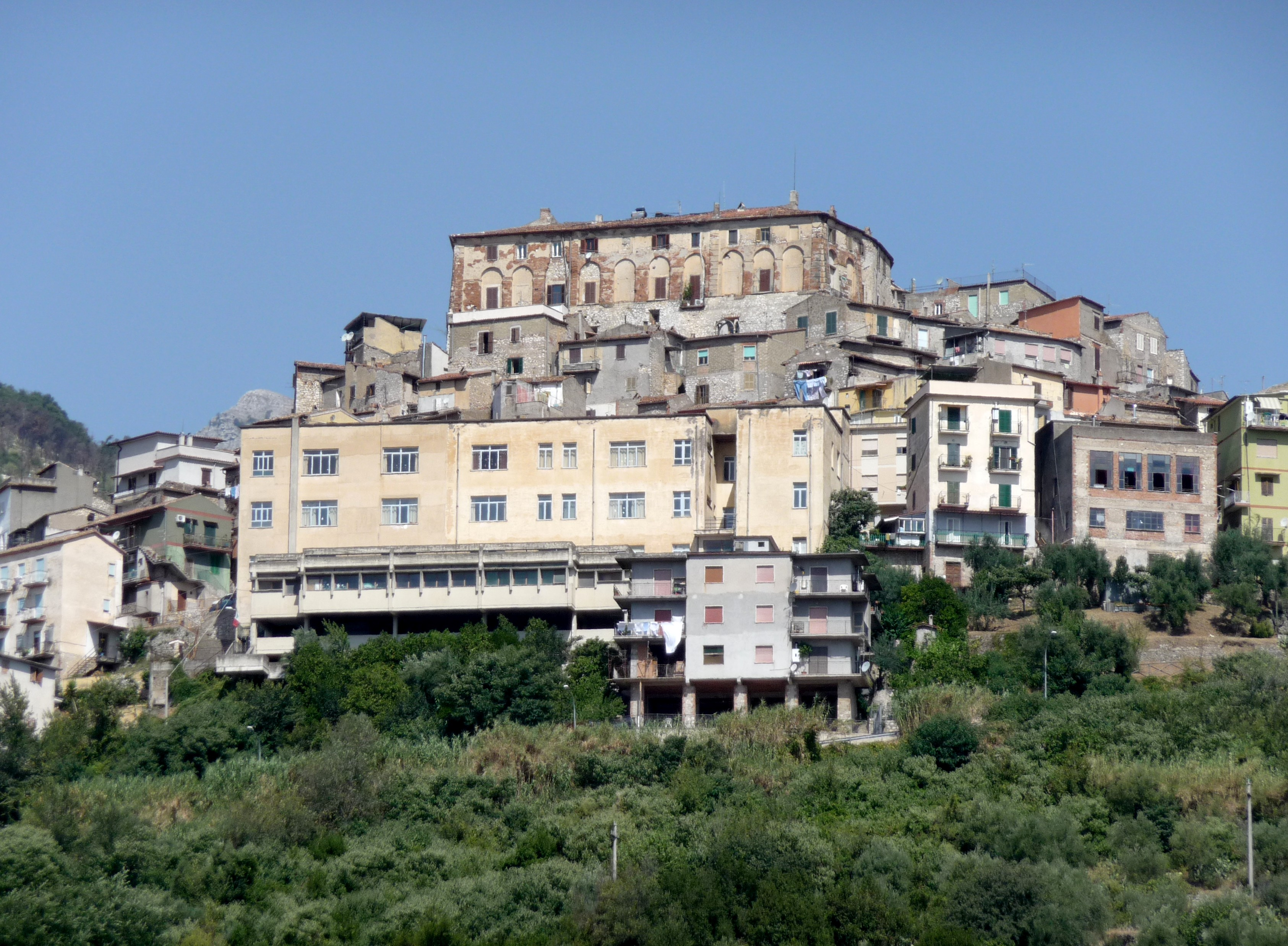
- View of Roccagorga

- Location within Italy Location within Lazio
- Coordinates: 41°32′N 13°9′E
- Country: Italy
- Region: Lazio
- Province: Latina (LT)

Government
  - Mayor: Dmenico Talani

Area
  - Total: 24.49 km^{2} (9.46 sq mi)
- Elevation: 287 m (942 ft)

Population (31 August 2022)
  - Total: 4,132
  - Density: 168.7/km^{2} (437.0/sq mi)
- Demonym: Rocchigiani (archaic: Roccagorgàni)
- Time zone: UTC+1 (CET)
  - Summer (DST): UTC+2 (CEST)
- Postal code: 04010
- Dialing code: 0773
- Website: Official website

Roccagorga is a comune (municipality) in the Province of Latina in the Italian region Lazio, located about 70 kilometres (43 mi) southeast of Rome and about 20 kilometres (12 mi) northeast of Latina.

Roccagorga borders the following municipalities: Carpineto Romano, Maenza, Priverno, Sezze.

== Physical geography ==
The terrain is primarily hilly and mountainous with a soil rich in calcium. This helps provide a year-round supply of water to the area. The climate is mediterranean, with hot, dry summers and mild, wet winters. Agriculture in the area focuses on the growing of olives, as favoured by the mediterranean climate, the calcareous soil and the southern exposure of the hillsides.

== History ==
Roccagorga is situated on Monte Nero, a hill in the southern Lepini mountains. Its origins date back to the aftermath of the destruction of Privernum in 796 AD although it was not until the Middle Ages that it began to develop on the second peak of Gorga, around the old Castle. It is named after the matron Gorga who, according to legend, settled on Monte Nero along with the Privernati refugees.

== Roccagorga Massacre ==
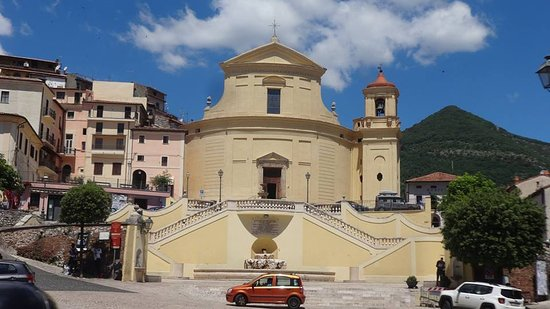
The church of Santi Leonardo e Erasmo overlooking the Piazza VI Gennaio.

On 6 January 1913, the Savoy Agricultural Society organised a demonstration by impoverished inhabitants of the town to protest against the local tax system and the inadequate sanitation situation. The original demonstration in Piazza Vittorio Emanuele, the main square in the village passed without incident. However, when a group of participants, including several women went to the offices of the society to get an Italian tricolour, the Carabinieri took offense. When they stepped forward to confiscate the flag from the woman carrying it, the demonstrators came to her assistance. Scuffles broke out and some demonstrators started throwing stones. The Army opened fire and killed 7 inhabitants of Roccagorga, with a further 23 non-fatal casualties. The Prime Minister, Giovanni Giolitti, then declared that the revolt was so serious that large-scale arrests were required. Benito Mussolini was the editor of Avanti, the left-wing newspaper of the Italian Socialist Party. He wrote an article entitled "State Assassination" in which he denounced the repression. He continued to mount a press campaign against the government, but was then arrested and tried for provoking the soldiers to disobedience and insulting the army. However, he was acquitted by the jury. The piazza was subsequently renamed Piazza VI Gennaio (6 January square) to commemorate the event.

== Main sights ==
- Hermitage of St. Erasmus.
- Ethnical Museum of the Lepini Mountains.
- Church of St Leonard and St Erasmus.
- Baronial Palace.
