= Maria Caterina Troiani =

Blessed Maria Caterina Troiani

Nun
- Born: 19 January 1813; Giuliano di Roma, Papal States
- Died: 6 May 1887 (aged 74); Cairo, Egypt
- Venerated in: Roman Catholic Church
- Beatified: 14 April 1985, Saint Peter's Square, Vatican City by Pope John Paul II
- Feast: 6 May
- Attributes: Nun's habit; Crucifix
- Patronage: Franciscan Missionaries of the Immaculate Heart of Mary

Maria Caterina Troiani (19 January 1813 – 6 May 1887) was an Italian Roman Catholic charitable worker who assumed the name of "Maria Caterina of Saint Rose" when she became a nun. Troiani established the Franciscan Missionaries of the Immaculate Heart of Mary. She was a member of the Third Order of Saint Francis.

Pope John Paul II beatified her on 14 April 1985 and the cause of canonization still continues pending another miracle needed – there is one now under investigation.

== Life ==
Maria Caterina Troiani was born in Giuliano di Roma in 1813 as the third of four children of Tommaso Troiani and Teresa Panici. She was born in the Napoleonic period. She was orphaned at the age of six when her mother died.

She approached the Bishop of Ferentino and asked him if she could be received into a convent as a nun. She lived and learned the Franciscan path with Francis of Assisi as a guide and dedicated herself – with her fellow novitiates – to education and the care of girls.

On 8 December 1829 she took the religious habit of the institute and changed her name to "Maria Teresa of Saint Rose" in honor of Saint Rose of Viterbo.

Troiani made it her mission to promote the gospel abroad. She indicated to North Africa for this mission. In 1852 the Apostolic Vicar of Egypt requested that a Franciscan institute be opened in Cairo with the aim of providing education and vocational training to girls. The emphasis was on the poor.

She and four others left on 25 August 1859 and met Pope Pius IX on 4 September who blessed them. The five embarked at Civitavecchia and Giuseppe Modena accompanied them. The group arrived in Malta to learn that the Apostolic Vicar of Egypt died suddenly. On 14 September the group entered Cairo.

In 1868 various agreements between the Order of Friars Minor and the Congregation of Propaganda Fide ensured that the institution she established in Cairo was named as the Third Order Franciscan Sisters of Cairo. It was renamed in 1868 the Franciscan Missionary Sisters of Egypt, only to be changed in 1950 to its current name. She was its Mother Superior until her death.

She died in 1887 and was buried in Cairo. Her remains were exhumed and moved to Rome on 3 November 1967. Pope Leo XIII held her in high esteem.

== Beatification ==
Troiani's spiritual writings were approved by theologians on 27 November 1937. A local pre-beatification process ran from 1937 to 1939. Troiani's cause was formally opened on 23 June 1944, granting her the title of Servant of God. Another process commenced after the official opening and spanned from 1947 to 1950.

Both the processes were ratified in 1954 and it resulted in the declaration of her being Venerable on 12 July 1982 after Pope John Paul II recognized her life of heroic virtue.

A miracle attributed to her intercession was investigated in 1957 and ratified on 15 October 1982. John Paul II approved the miracle on 9 November 1984 and beatified her on 14 April 1985.

Another miracle needed for her canonization was investigated and it closed on 2011. The process was ratified on 28 October 2011.
