= Morolo =

- Comune
- Comune di Morolo
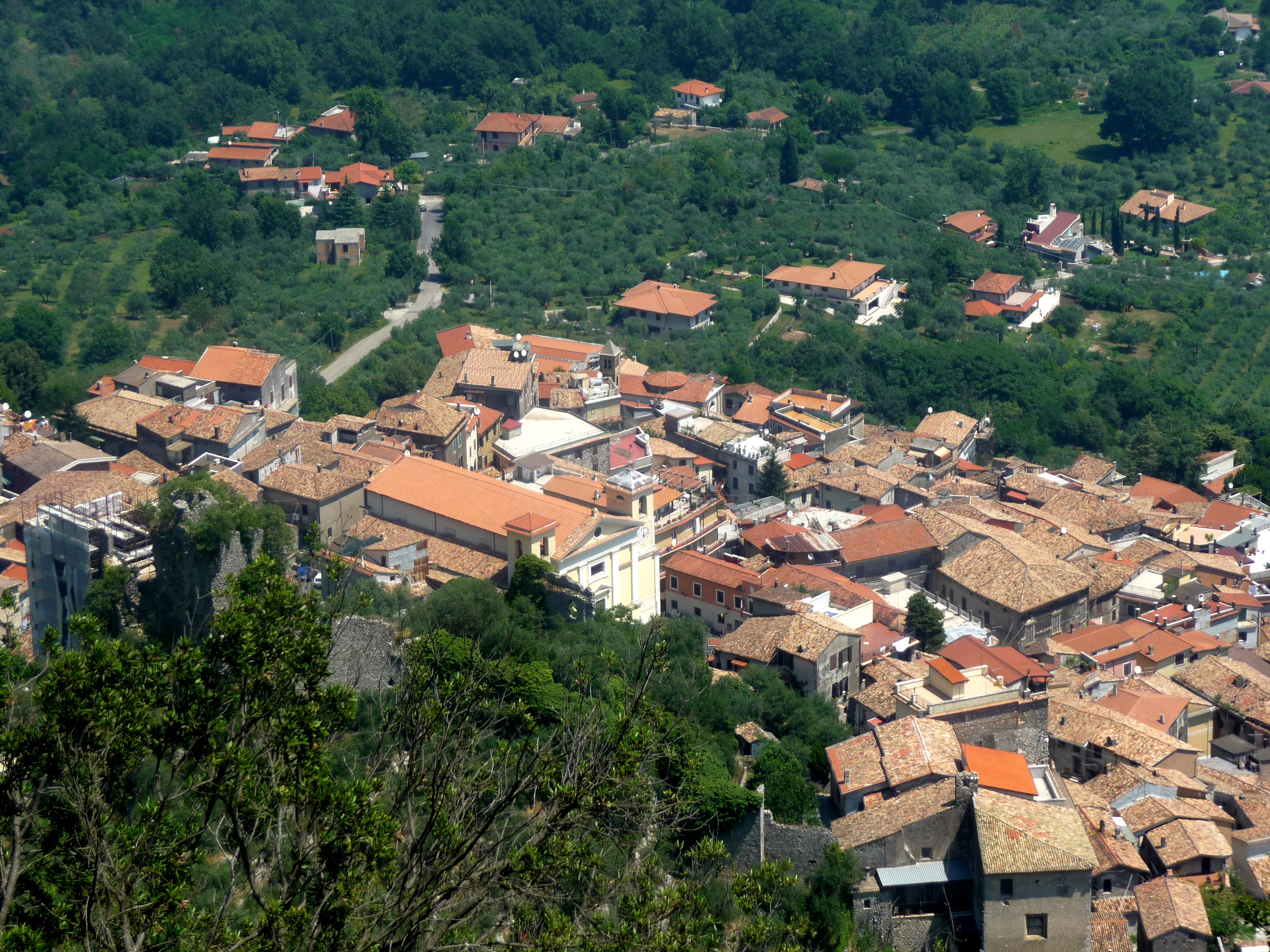
- View of Morolo

- Location within Italy Location within Lazio
- Coordinates: 41°38′N 13°12′E
- Country: Italy
- Region: Lazio
- Province: Frosinone (FR)

Government
  - Mayor: Gino Molinari

Area
  - Total: 26.5 km^{2} (10.2 sq mi)
- Elevation: 397 m (1,302 ft)

Population (31 December 2010)
  - Total: 3,299
  - Density: 124/km^{2} (322/sq mi)
- Demonym: Morolani
- Time zone: UTC+1 (CET)
  - Summer (DST): UTC+2 (CEST)
- Postal code: 03017
- Dialing code: 0775
- Patron saint: St. Michael Archangel
- Website: Official website

Morolo (locally Murolu) is a comune (municipality) in the Province of Frosinone in the Italian region Lazio, located about 70 kilometres (43 mi) southeast of Rome and about 12 kilometres (7 mi) west of Frosinone.

Morolo borders the following municipalities: Ferentino, Gorga, Sgurgola, Supino.

== People ==
- Ernesto Biondi

== Sister cities ==
- Hosszúhetény, Hungary
