= Pisterzo =

- Frazione
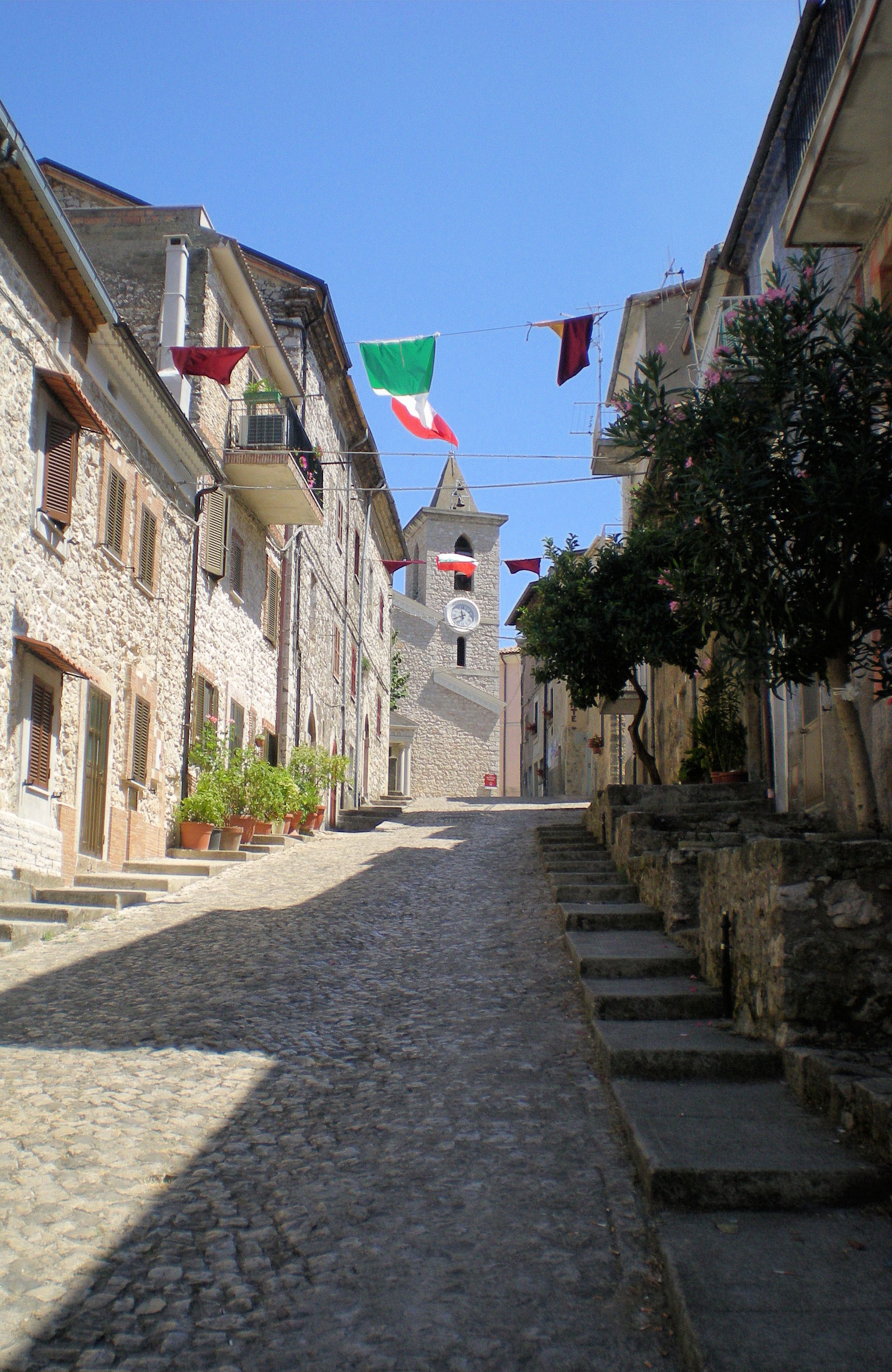
- Overview of Pisterzo

- Location of Pisterzo in Italy
- Coordinates: 41°29.45′0″N 13°16.2′0″E
- Country: Italy
- Region: Lazio
- Province: Latina (LT)
- Comune: Prossedi
- Elevation: 466 m (1,529 ft)

Population
  - Total: 40
- Demonym: Pisterzani
- Time zone: UTC+1 (CET)
  - Summer (DST): UTC+2 (CEST)
- Postal code: 04010
- Dialing code: 0773
- Patron saint: Saint Michael
- Saint day: September 29

Pisterzo is part of the municipality of Prossedi in Lazio, Italy.

== Description ==
A classic example of a medieval town, Pisterzo is a small village in the province of Latina, located in the mountainous area of the Ausoni Mountains, and overlooking the Amaseno's valley from which rise Monti Lepini, at 466 meters above sea level. The village has about eighty year-round inhabitants, but in summer it is often filled with vacationers who like to sit in peace and in a cool place. Seen from above, the town has a horseshoe shape.
