= Carpineto Romano =

- Comune
- Comune di Carpineto Romano
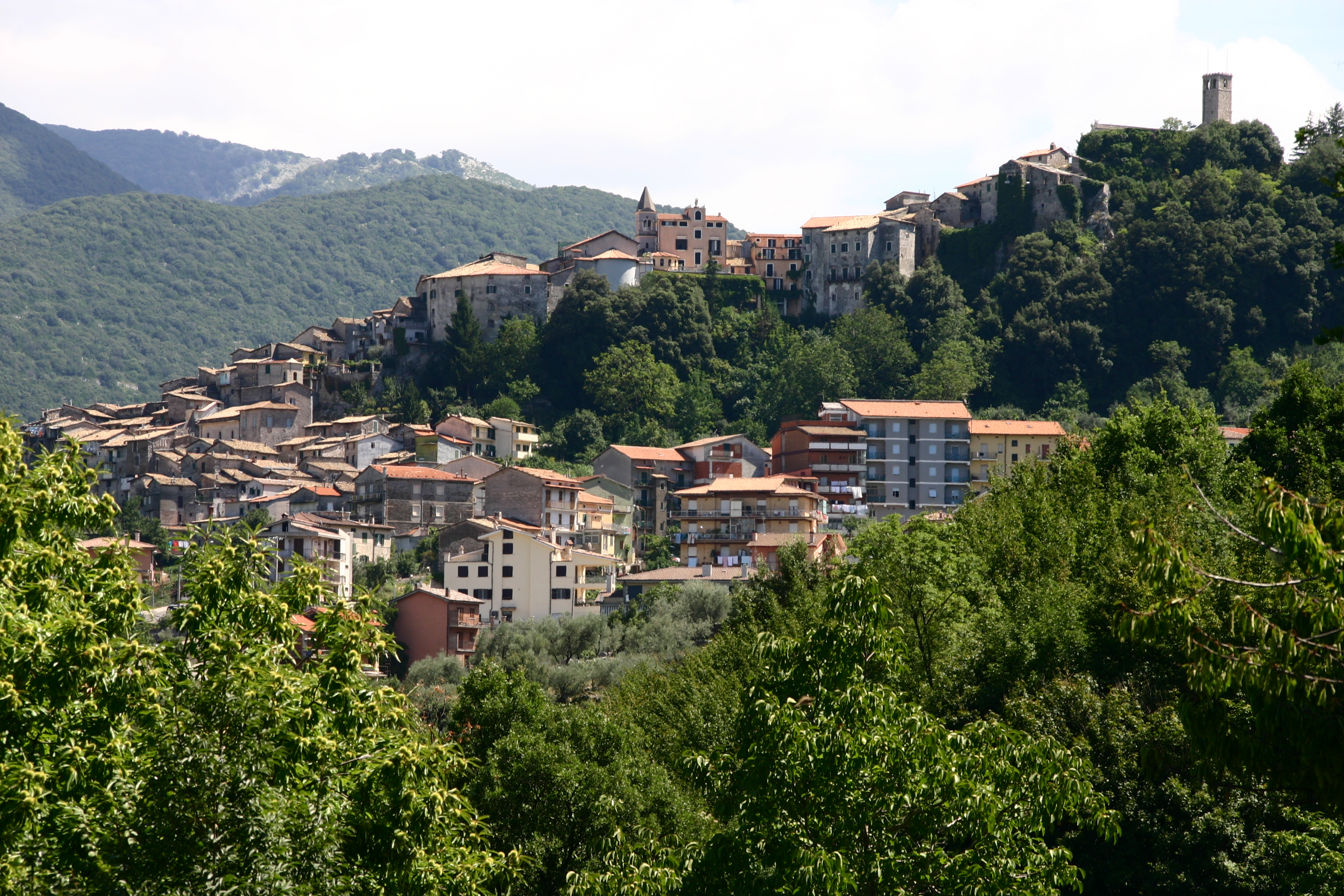
- View of Carpineto Romano

- Coat of arms

- Location within Italy Location within Lazio
- Coordinates: 41°36′N 13°5′E
- Country: Italy
- Region: Lazio
- Metropolitan city: Rome (RM)

Government
  - Mayor: Stefano Cacciotti

Area
  - Total: 86.29 km^{2} (33.32 sq mi)
- Elevation: 550 m (1,800 ft)

Population (31 August 2020)
  - Total: 4,218
  - Density: 48.88/km^{2} (126.6/sq mi)
- Demonym: Carpinetani
- Time zone: UTC+1 (CET)
  - Summer (DST): UTC+2 (CEST)
- Postal code: 00032
- Dialing code: 06
- Website: Official website

Carpineto Romano is a comune (municipality) in the Metropolitan City of Rome in the Italian region Lazio, located about 60 kilometres (37 miles) southeast of Rome.

It is the birthplace of Gioacchino Pecci, later Pope Leo XIII.

Carpineto Romano borders the following municipalities: Bassiano, Gorga, Maenza, Montelanico, Norma, Roccagorga, Sezze, Supino.

== Twin towns and sister cities ==
Carpineto Romano is twinned

- Wadowice, Poland
