= Moura, Portugal =

Moura
- Municipality
- Terra da Cal
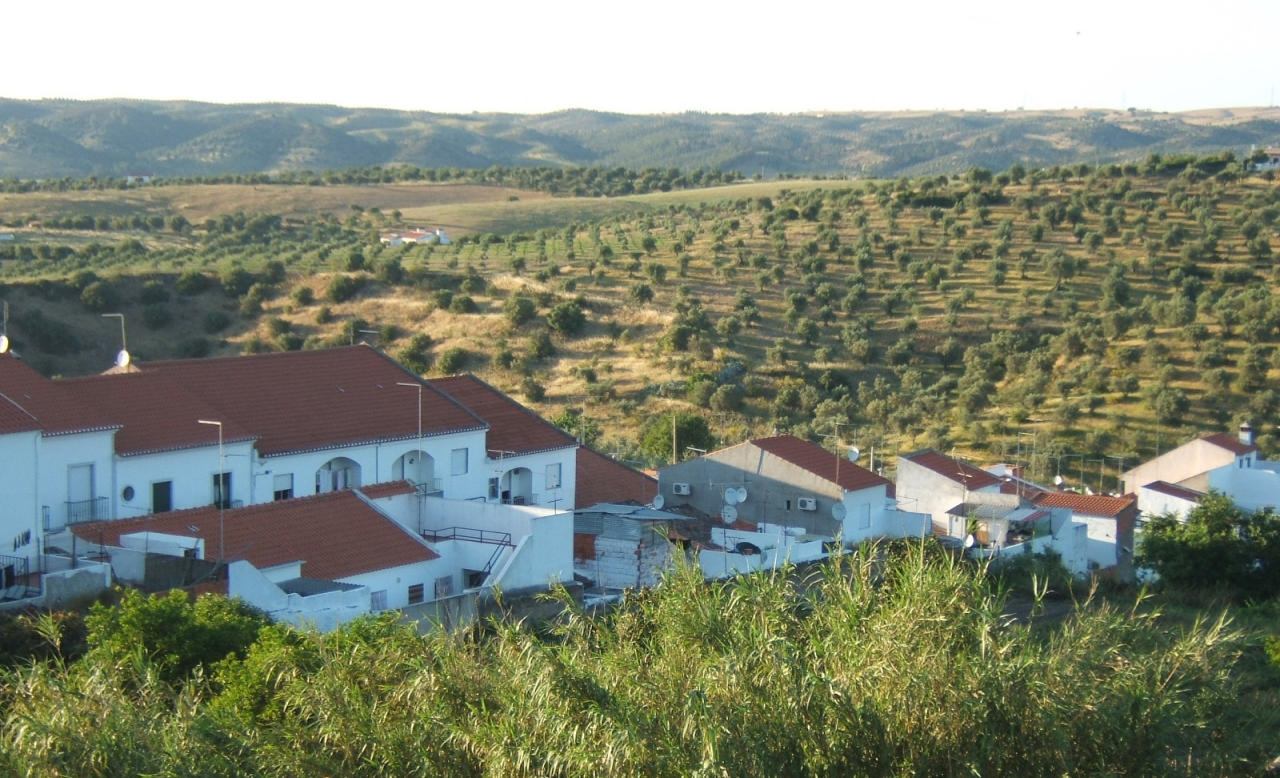
- View of Moura

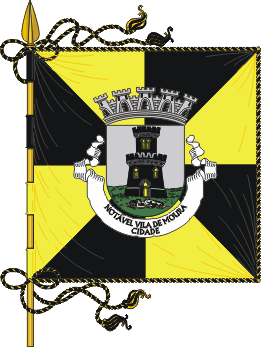
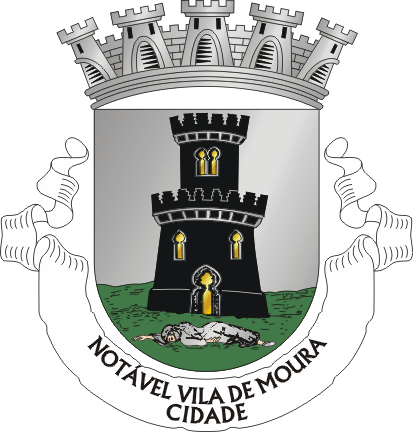
- Flag Coat of arms
- Interactive map of Moura
- Coordinates: 38°08′N 7°27′W
- Country: Portugal
- Region: Alentejo
- Intermunic. comm.: Baixo Alentejo
- District: Beja
- Parishes: 8

Government
  - President: Santiago Macias (CDU)

Area
  - Total: 958.46 km^{2} (370.06 sq mi)

Population (2021)
  - Total: 13,258
  - Density: 13.833/km^{2} (35.826/sq mi)
- Time zone: UTC+00:00 (WET)
  - Summer (DST): UTC+01:00 (WEST)
- Local holiday: Saint John; June 24
- Website: www.cm-moura.pt

Moura, (Note: European Portuguese pronunciation: [ˈmoɾɐ]) officially the Notable Town of Cal, (Note: Portuguese: Notável terra da Cal) is a city and a municipality in the District of Beja in Portugal, subdivided into 5 freguesias. The population in 2021 was 13,258, in an area of 958.46 square kilometres (370.06 mi^{2}). The city itself had a population of 8,459 in 2001. It has now around 11,000 inhabitants.

The current mayor is José Pós de Mina, elected by the Unitary Democratic Coalition, the municipal holiday is 24 June.

Many residents claim that this is where the Photovoltaic Power Station, one of Europe's largest solar-power facilities is, but the official location is Amareleja.

There are two wine regions within the borders of Moura municipality: Moura centered around the town of Moura and Granja-Amareleja within the parishes of Amareleja, Póvoa de São Miguel and part of Santo Amador and São João Baptista.

== Parishes ==
Administratively, the municipality is divided into 5 civil parishes (freguesias):

- Amareleja
- Moura (Santo Agostinho e São João Baptista) e Santo Amador
- Póvoa de São Miguel
- Safara
- Santo Aleixo da Restauração
- Sobral da Adiça

== Climate ==
Moura has a Mediterranean climate with very hot, dry summers and mild winters. It is one of the driest areas in Portugal with just over 400 mm (16 in) of precipitation.

Climate data for Moura, 15 year period (between 1941 and 1991), 158 m (518 ft)
Month	Jan	Feb	Mar	Apr	May	Jun	Jul	Aug	Sep	Oct	Nov	Dec	Year
Mean daily maximum °C (°F)	14.3 (57.7)	15.9 (60.6)	18.7 (65.7)	21.1 (70.0)	24.9 (76.8)	30.2 (86.4)	34.2 (93.6)	34.1 (93.4)	30.2 (86.4)	24.3 (75.7)	18.5 (65.3)	14.5 (58.1)	23.4 (74.1)
Daily mean °C (°F)	9.9 (49.8)	11.1 (52.0)	13.3 (55.9)	15.3 (59.5)	18.4 (65.1)	22.8 (73.0)	25.8 (78.4)	25.6 (78.1)	23.2 (73.8)	18.6 (65.5)	13.8 (56.8)	10.4 (50.7)	17.3 (63.2)
Mean daily minimum °C (°F)	5.4 (41.7)	6.3 (43.3)	7.8 (46.0)	9.4 (48.9)	11.9 (53.4)	15.3 (59.5)	17.3 (63.1)	17.1 (62.8)	16.1 (61.0)	12.9 (55.2)	9.1 (48.4)	6.2 (43.2)	11.2 (52.2)
Average precipitation mm (inches)	56.8 (2.24)	45.4 (1.79)	49.2 (1.94)	40.7 (1.60)	30.8 (1.21)	15.4 (0.61)	2.8 (0.11)	2.1 (0.08)	17.9 (0.70)	46.2 (1.82)	50.9 (2.00)	60.7 (2.39)	418.9 (16.49)
Source: IPMA

Climate data for Contenda, 1971-2000 normals and extremes, altitude: 450 m (1,480 ft)
Month	Jan	Feb	Mar	Apr	May	Jun	Jul	Aug	Sep	Oct	Nov	Dec	Year
Record high °C (°F)	25.5 (77.9)	28.5 (83.3)	29.5 (85.1)	30.5 (86.9)	34.2 (93.6)	42.5 (108.5)	44.1 (111.4)	42.1 (107.8)	40.7 (105.3)	34.6 (94.3)	27.2 (81.0)	25.9 (78.6)	44.1 (111.4)
Mean daily maximum °C (°F)	12.9 (55.2)	14.3 (57.7)	17.4 (63.3)	18.6 (65.5)	22.3 (72.1)	28.0 (82.4)	32.5 (90.5)	32.4 (90.3)	28.6 (83.5)	22.1 (71.8)	17.0 (62.6)	13.8 (56.8)	21.7 (71.0)
Daily mean °C (°F)	9.4 (48.9)	10.4 (50.7)	12.6 (54.7)	13.7 (56.7)	16.6 (61.9)	21.2 (70.2)	24.8 (76.6)	24.7 (76.5)	22.3 (72.1)	17.5 (63.5)	13.4 (56.1)	10.5 (50.9)	16.4 (61.6)
Mean daily minimum °C (°F)	6.0 (42.8)	6.6 (43.9)	7.9 (46.2)	8.7 (47.7)	10.9 (51.6)	14.3 (57.7)	17.1 (62.8)	17.1 (62.8)	15.9 (60.6)	12.9 (55.2)	9.6 (49.3)	7.3 (45.1)	11.2 (52.1)
Record low °C (°F)	−5.0 (23.0)	−2.6 (27.3)	−3.0 (26.6)	0.8 (33.4)	2.5 (36.5)	6.3 (43.3)	8.9 (48.0)	9.0 (48.2)	6.4 (43.5)	3.4 (38.1)	0.2 (32.4)	−3.0 (26.6)	−5.0 (23.0)
Average rainfall mm (inches)	75.5 (2.97)	61.6 (2.43)	45.5 (1.79)	73.8 (2.91)	45.2 (1.78)	26.1 (1.03)	6.3 (0.25)	4.2 (0.17)	34.0 (1.34)	70.2 (2.76)	72.6 (2.86)	99.1 (3.90)	614.1 (24.19)
Average precipitation days (≥ 0.1 mm)	10.1	10.8	9.5	10.5	8.2	4.6	1.2	0.9	3.8	9.7	8.5	11.3	89.1
Source: Instituto Português do Mar e da Atmosfera

== Town Twinning ==
Moura has cooperation agreements with the following cities:

- Aroche, Spain, since 1994
- Bissau, Guinea-Bissau, since 1997
- Amareleja-Valencia del Mombuey, Spain, since 2000
- Medjez El Bab, Tunisia, since 1995
- Roccagorga, Italy

Other towns with the same name include:

- Moura, Australia

== Notable people ==
- Gonçalo Abecasis (born 1976) a Portuguese American biomedical researcher at the University of Michigan
- Corino Andrade (1906–2005) a leading neurologist and researcher who first described the familial amyloidotic polyneuropathy (FAP) syndrome
- Miguel Garcia (born 1983) a former footballer with 228 club caps
- Eunice Muñoz (born 1928 in Amareleja) a Portuguese actress
- Francisco Martins Rodrigues (1927– 2008) a Portuguese anti-Fascist and the founder of the Portuguese Marxist-Leninist Committee
- António Rolim de Moura Tavares (1709 – 1782) the 1st Count of Azambuja and the 10th Viceroy of Brazil

== Gallery ==
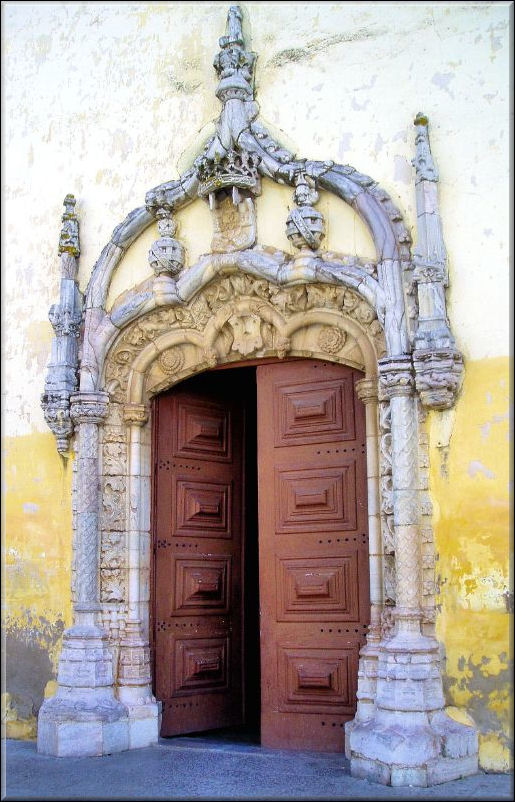
Moura, Portugal

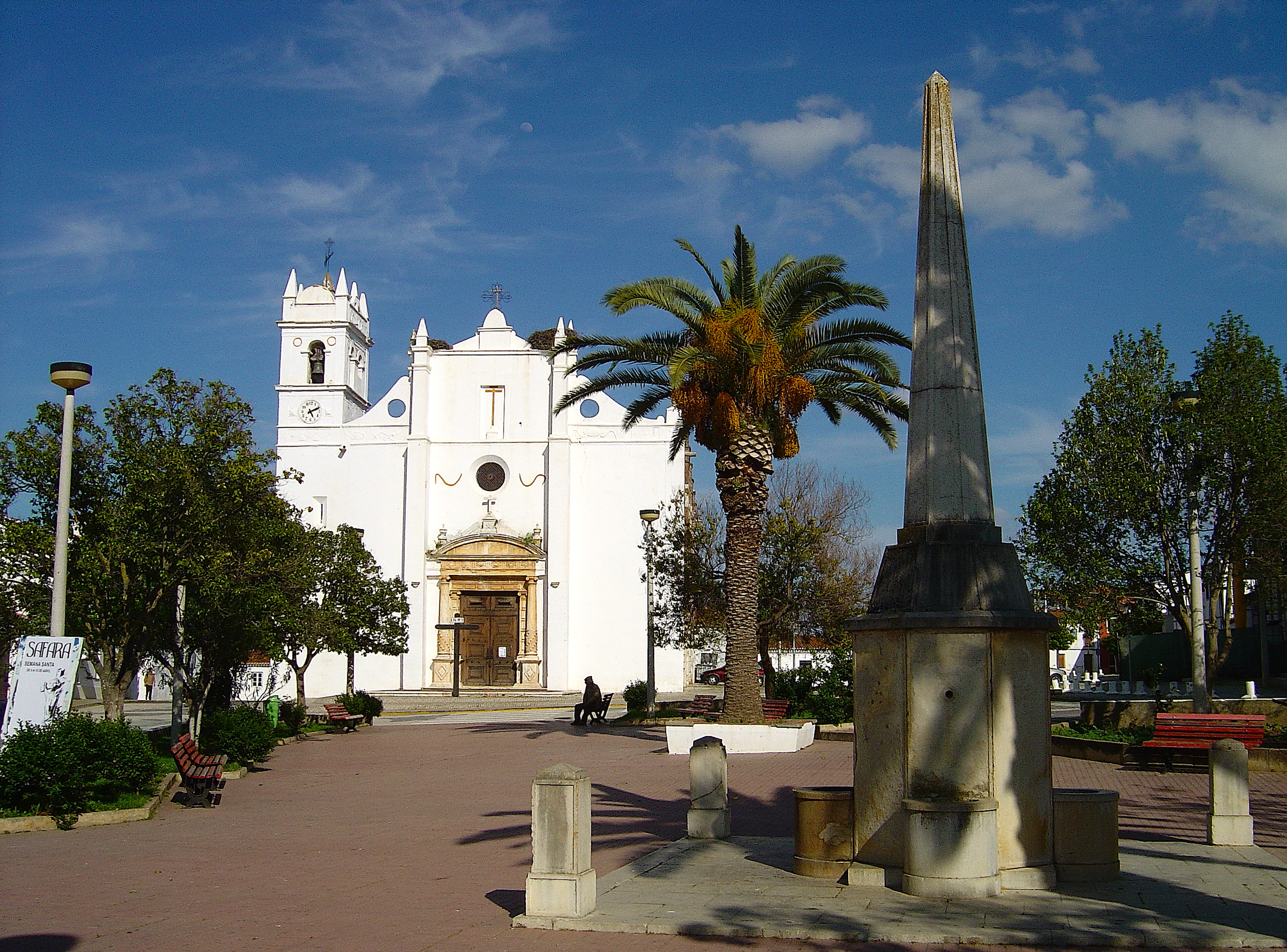
Moura, Portugal

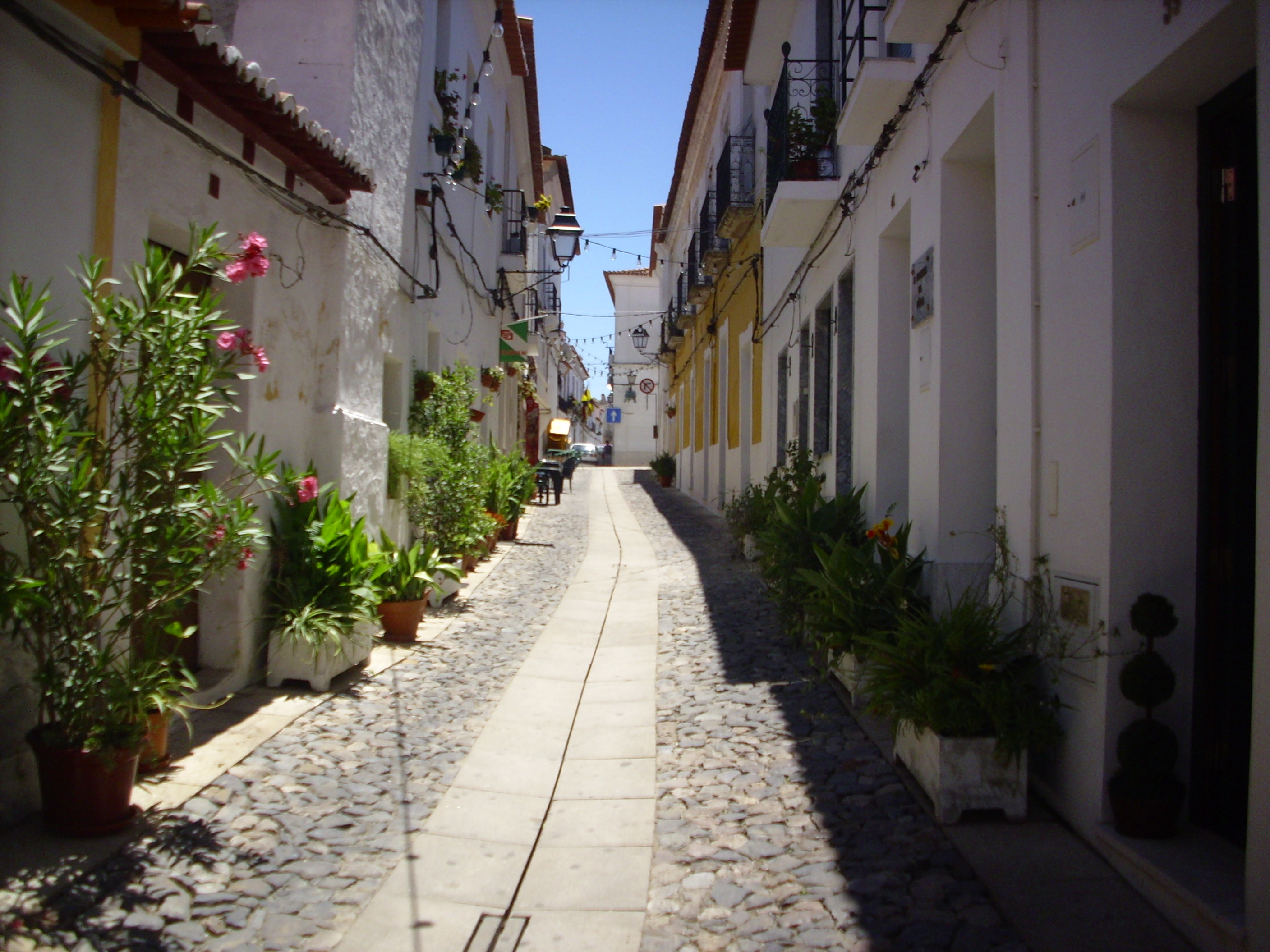
Moura, Portugal

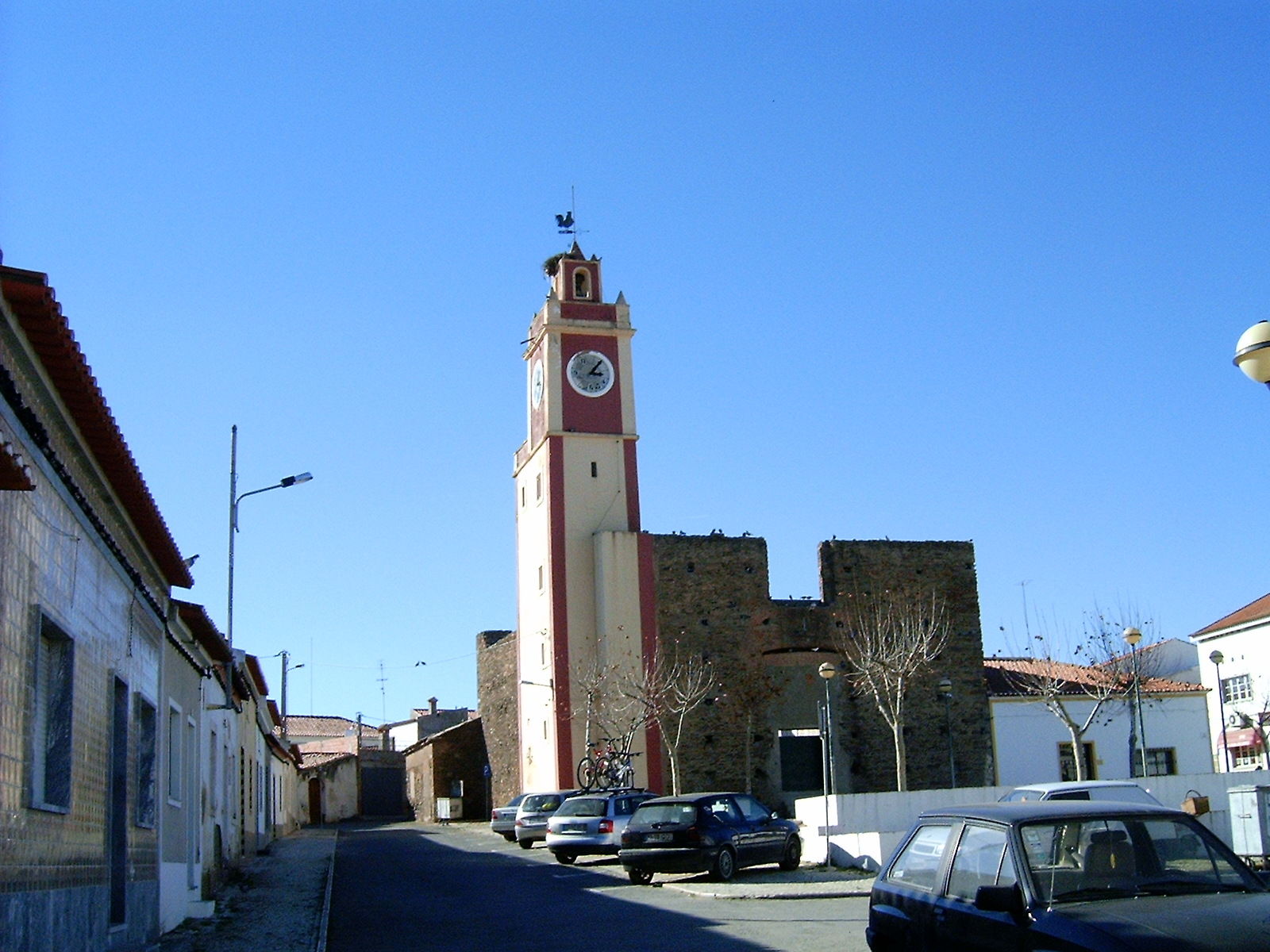
Moura, Portugal

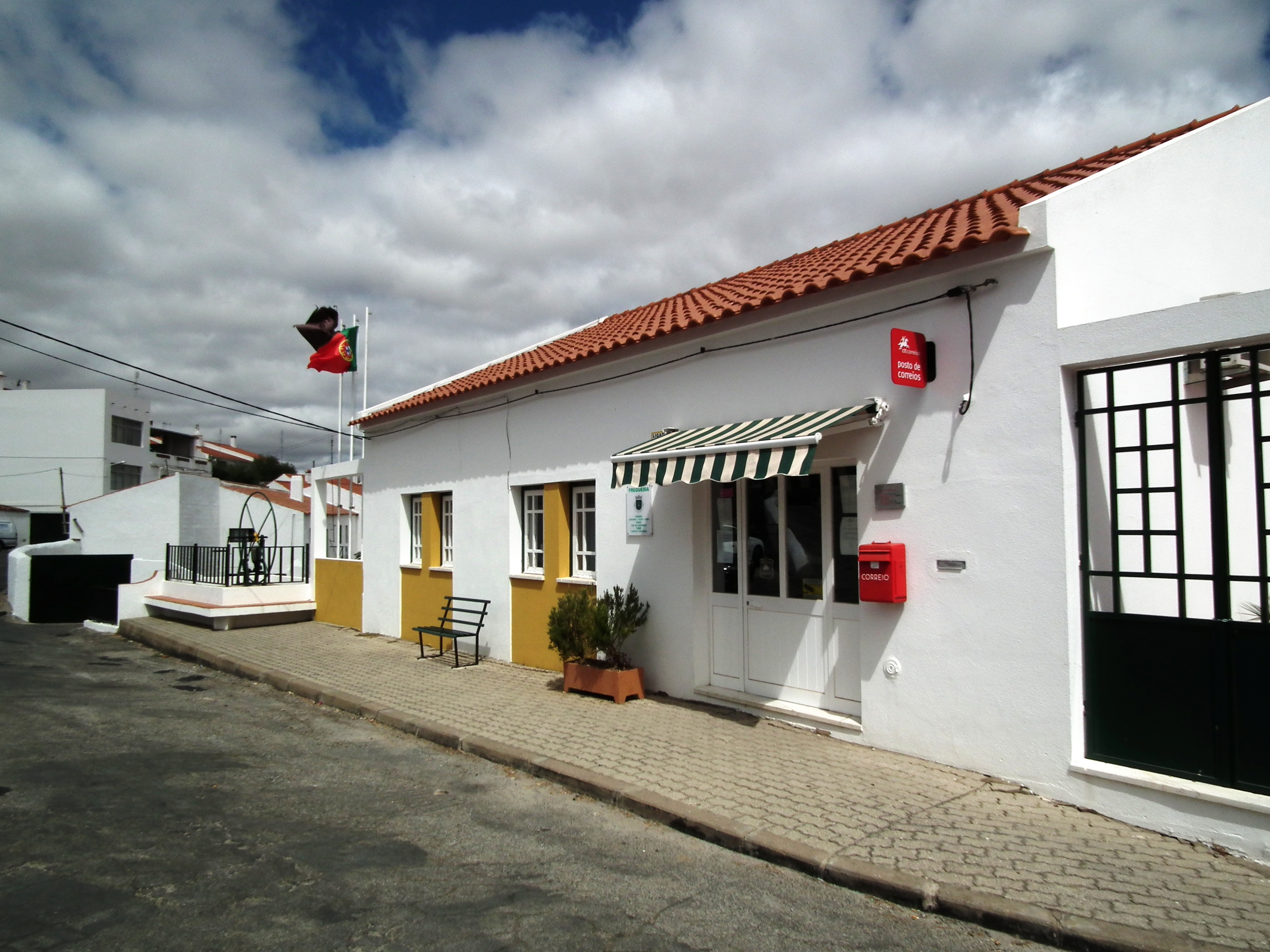
Moura, Portugal

== See also ==
- Moura IPR
