= Montelanico =

- Comune
- Comune di Montelanico
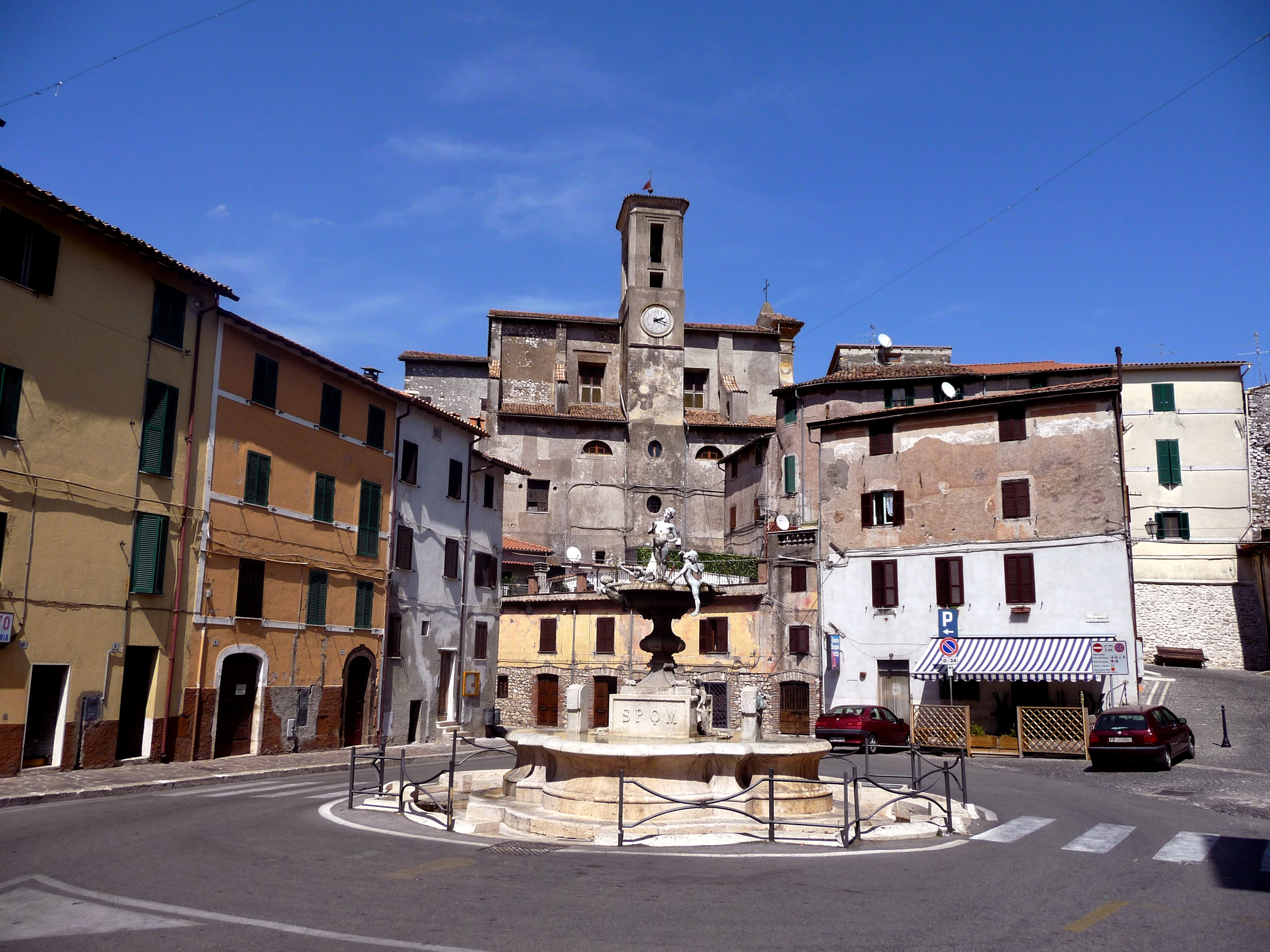
- Piazza Vittorio Emanuele II

- Coat of arms

- Location within Italy Location within Lazio
- Coordinates: 41°39′N 13°2′E
- Country: Italy
- Region: Lazio
- Metropolitan city: Rome (RM)

Government
  - Mayor: Sandro Onorato

Area
  - Total: 35.14 km^{2} (13.57 sq mi)
- Elevation: 297 m (974 ft)

Population (31 August 2020)
  - Total: 2,115
  - Density: 60.19/km^{2} (155.9/sq mi)
- Demonym: Montelanichesi
- Time zone: UTC+1 (CET)
  - Summer (DST): UTC+2 (CEST)
- Postal code: 00030
- Dialing code: 06
- Patron saint: St. Michael and Madonna del Soccorso
- Website: Official website

Montelanico is a comune (municipality) in the Metropolitan City of Rome in the Italian region of Latium, located about 50 kilometres (31 mi) southeast of Rome.

Montelanico is home to an annual international short films festival, titled Arrivano i corti ("The short [film]s arrive").

== Twin towns ==
- Lagnes, France
