= Monti Lepini =

Mountain range in Italy

Lepini Mountains
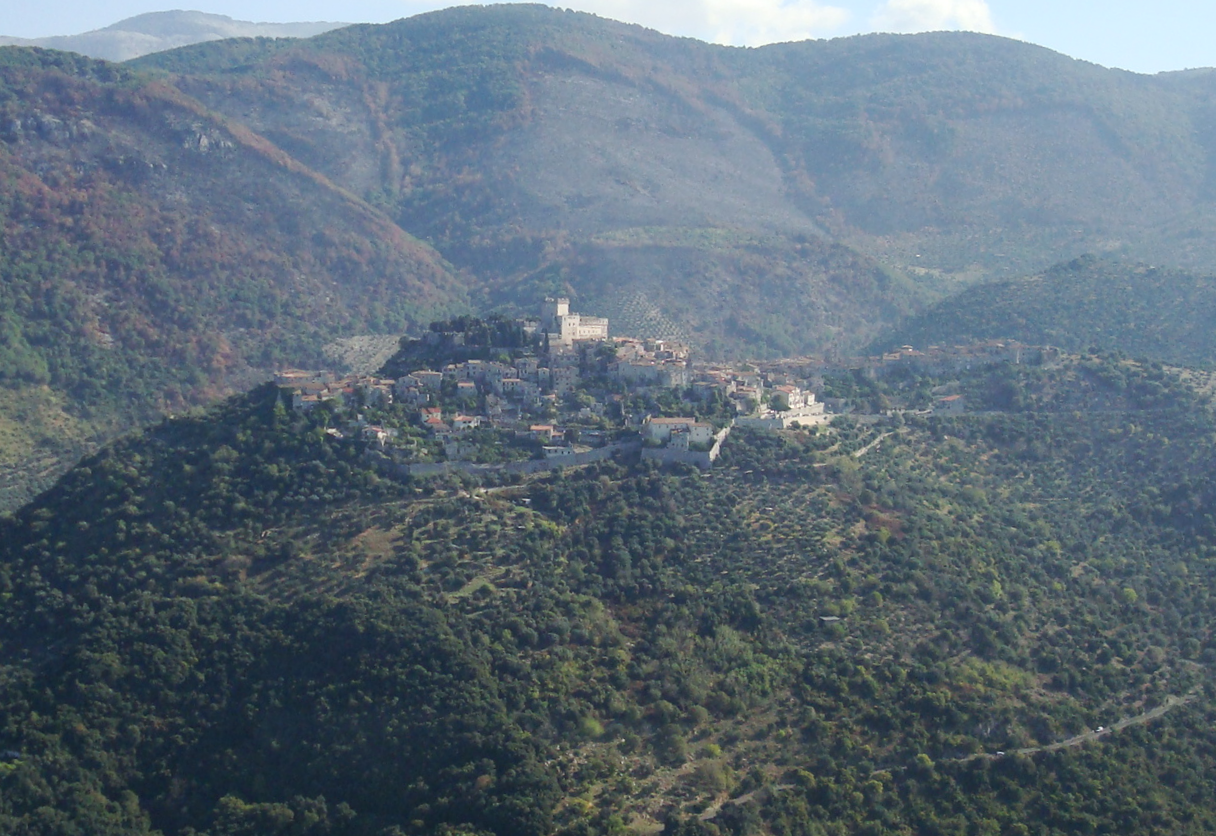
- Sermoneta, on the foothills of the Monti Lepini, visible in the background. The Agro Pontino is out of sight at the foot of the hill in the foreground.

Naming
- Etymology: Ancient tribal name
- Native name: Monti Lepini (Italian)

Geography
- Location within Italy
- Country: Italy
- Region: Lazio
- Province: Latina
- Range coordinates: 41°35′N 13°00′E
- Parent range: Apennine Mountains, Volsci Chain

Geology
- Orogeny: Southern Apenninic Orogeny
- Rock age(s): Messinian of Miocene, Pliocene-Pleistocene
- Rock type: limestone karst

The Monti Lepini (Italian: Lepini mountains) are a mountain range which belongs to the Anti-Apennines of the Lazio region of central Italy, between the two provinces of Latina and Rome.

The range borders to the north with the Colli Albani, to the south-east with the Amaseno Valley, to the south with the Monti Ausoni and to the west with the Pontinian Plain. The highest peak is the Monte Semprevisa (1,536 m).

The name derives probably from the Latin lapis (stone), referring to the mountains’ limestone rocks. In ancient times, the area was settled by the Volsci.

The most striking natural feature is the Gardens of Ninfa. There are also numerous grottoes, including some of the most significant in central Italy. The wildlife of the mountains includes peregrine falcons, griffons and Apennine wolves.
