= Giuliano di Roma =

- Comune
- Comune di Giuliano di Roma
- Coat of arms

- Location within Italy Location within Lazio
- Coordinates: 41°32′N 13°17′E
- Country: Italy
- Region: Lazio
- Province: Frosinone (FR)

Government
  - Mayor: Adriano Lampazzi

Area
  - Total: 33.54 km^{2} (12.95 sq mi)
- Elevation: 363 m (1,191 ft)

Population (31 August 2017)
  - Total: 2,413
  - Density: 71.94/km^{2} (186.3/sq mi)
- Demonym: Giulianesi
- Time zone: UTC+1 (CET)
  - Summer (DST): UTC+2 (CEST)
- Postal code: 03020
- Dialing code: 0775
- Patron saint: St. Blaise
- Saint day: 3 February and the last Sunday in August
- Website: Official website

Giuliano di Roma (Central-Northern Latian: Gigliane) is a comune (municipality) in the province of Frosinone in the Italian region Lazio, located about 80 kilometres (50 mi) southeast of Rome and about 12 kilometres (7 mi) southwest of Frosinone.

Blessed Maria Caterina Troiani, a charitable activist, was born here in 1813.
