= Ludwig I of Bavaria =

King of Bavaria from 1825 to 1848

Ludwig I
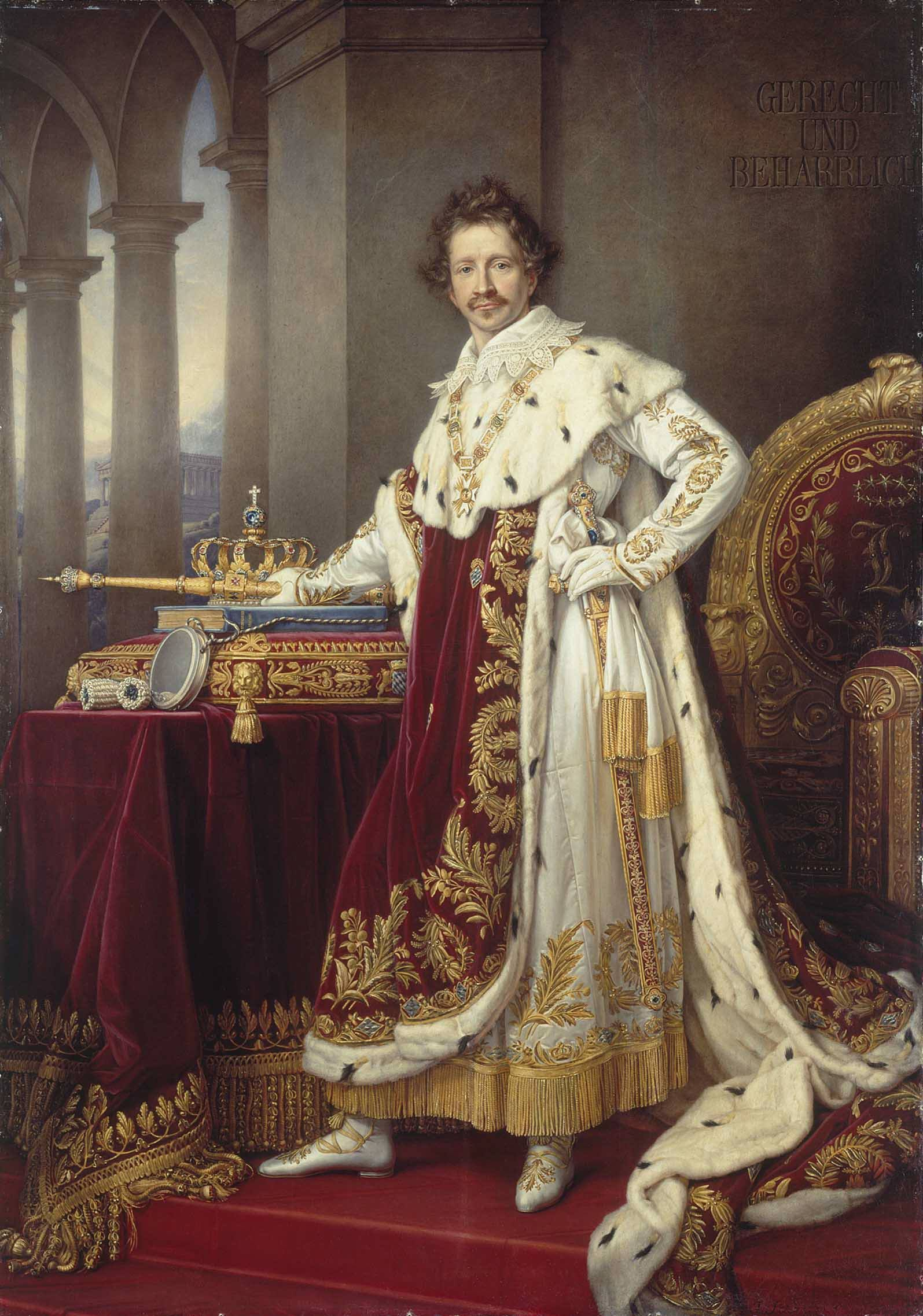
- Portrait of Ludwig I by Joseph Stieler, 1826

King of Bavaria
- Reign: 13 October 1825 – 20 March 1848
- Predecessor: Maximilian I Joseph
- Successor: Maximilian II
- Born: 25 August 1786; Strasbourg, Kingdom of France
- Died: 29 February 1868 (aged 81); Nice, Second French Empire
- Burial: St. Boniface's Abbey, Munich
- Spouse: Therese of Saxe-Hildburghausen (m. 1810; died 1854)
- Issue: Maximilian II, King of Bavaria; Mathilde Caroline, Grand Duchess of Hesse and by Rhine; Otto, King of Greece; Princess Theodelinde; Luitpold, Prince Regent of Bavaria; Adelgunde, Duchess of Modena; Hildegard, Duchess of Teschen; Princess Alexandra; Prince Adalbert
Names
- German: Ludwig Karl August; English: Louis Charles Augustus
- House: Wittelsbach
- Father: Maximilian I Joseph of Bavaria
- Mother: Augusta Wilhelmine of Hesse-Darmstadt
- Religion: Roman Catholicism

Ludwig I or Louis I (German: Ludwig I.; 25 August 1786 – 29 February 1868) was King of Bavaria from 1825 until the 1848 revolutions in the German states. When he was crown prince, he was involved in the Napoleonic Wars. As king, he encouraged Bavaria's industrialization, initiating the Ludwig Canal between the rivers Main and the Danube. In 1835, the first German railway was constructed in his domain, between Fürth and Nuremberg, with his Bavaria joining the Zollverein economic union in 1834. After the July Revolution of 1830 in France, Ludwig's previous liberal policy became increasingly repressive; in 1844, he was confronted during the Beer riots in Bavaria. During the revolutions of 1848, he faced increasing protests and demonstrations by students and the middle classes. On 20 March 1848, he abdicated in favour of his eldest son, Maximilian.

Ludwig lived another 20 years after his abdication and remained influential. An admirer of ancient Greece and the Italian Renaissance, he patronized the arts and commissioned several neoclassical buildings, especially in Munich. He was an avid collector of arts, amassing paintings from the Early German and Early Dutch periods as well as Graeco-Roman sculptures.

All living legitimate agnatic members of the House of Wittelsbach descend from him.

== Crown prince ==
Born in the Zweibrücker Hof in Straßburg as Ludwig Karl August von Pfalz-Birkenfeld-Zweibrücken, he was the son of Count Palatine Maximilian Joseph of Zweibrücken (later Maximilian I Joseph of Bavaria) by his first wife Princess Augusta Wilhelmine of Hesse-Darmstadt. At the time of his birth, his father was an officer in the French Army stationed at Strasbourg. Ludwig was the godson and namesake of Louis XVI of France.

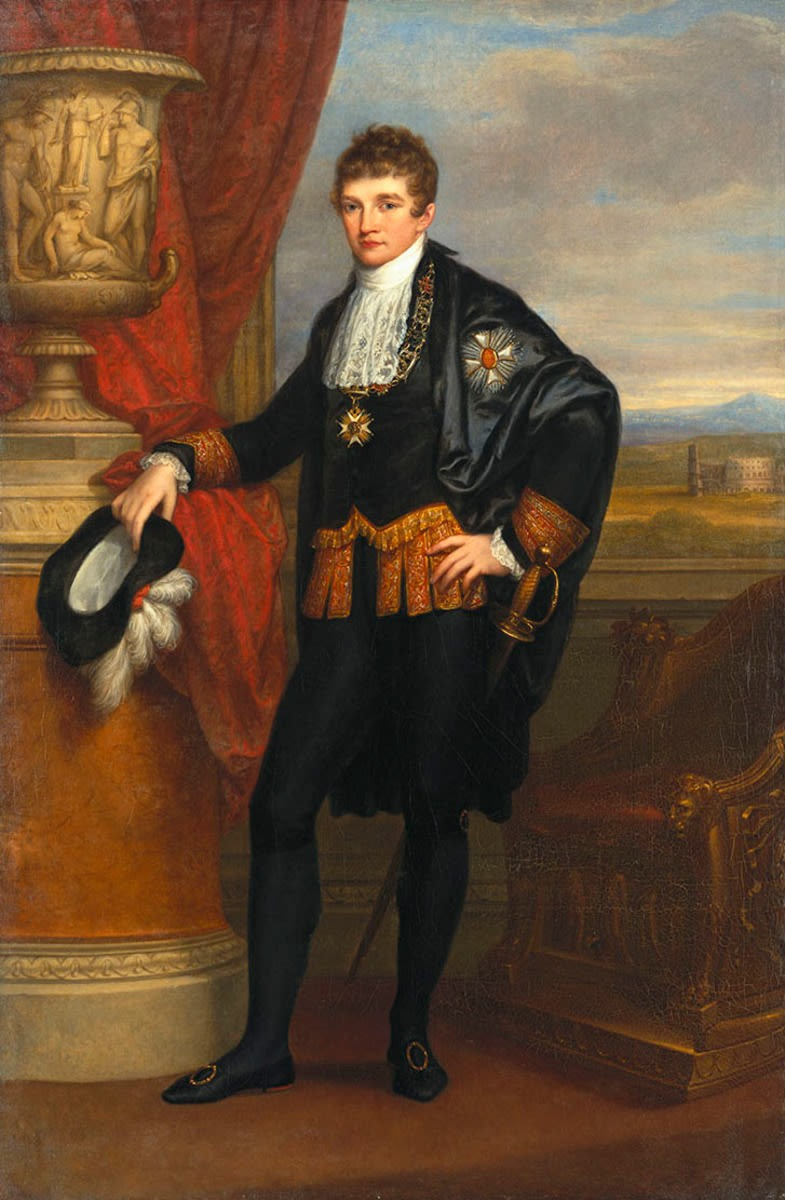
Portrait of Crown Prince Ludwig by Angelica Kauffman, 1807

On 1 April 1795 his father succeeded Ludwig's uncle, Charles II, as duke of Zweibrücken, and on 16 February 1799 became Elector of Bavaria and Count Palatine of the Rhine, the Arch-Steward of the Empire, and Duke of Berg on the extinction of the Sulzbach line with the death of the elector Charles Theodore. His father assumed the title of King of Bavaria on 1 January 1806.

Starting in 1803 Ludwig studied at the Ludwig-Maximilians-Universität in Landshut, where he was taught by Johann Michael Sailer and in Göttingen. On 12 October 1810 he married Therese of Saxe-Hildburghausen (1792–1854), the daughter of Frederick, Duke of Saxe-Hildburghausen. The wedding was the occasion of the first-ever Oktoberfest.

Ludwig strongly rejected the alliance of his father with Napoleon of France but in spite of his anti-French politics the crown prince had to join the emperor's wars with allied Bavarian troops in 1806. As commander of the 1st Bavarian Division in VII Corps, he served under Marshal François Joseph Lefebvre in 1809. He led his division in action at the Battle of Abensberg on 20 April.

With the Treaty of Ried of 8 October 1813 Bavaria left the Confederation of the Rhine and agreed to join the Sixth Coalition against Napoleon in exchange for a guarantee of its continued sovereign and independent status. On 14 October, Bavaria formally declared war against Napoleonic France. The treaty was passionately backed by Crown Prince Ludwig and by Marshal von Wrede.

Already at the 1815 Congress of Vienna, Ludwig advocated a German national policy. Until 1816 the crown prince served as governor-general of the Duchy of Salzburg, whose cession to Austria he strongly opposed. His second son, Otto, the later King of Greece, was born there. Between 1816 and 1825, he spent his years in Würzburg. He also made numerous trips to Italy and stayed often in the Villa Malta in Rome, which he later also bought (1827). Ludwig supported generously as a Philhellene the Greek War of Independence, in which he provided a loan of 1.5 million florins from his private funds.

In 1817 Ludwig was also involved in the fall of Prime Minister Count Max Josef von Montgelas whose policies he had opposed. He succeeded his father on the throne in 1825.

== Reign and fall ==
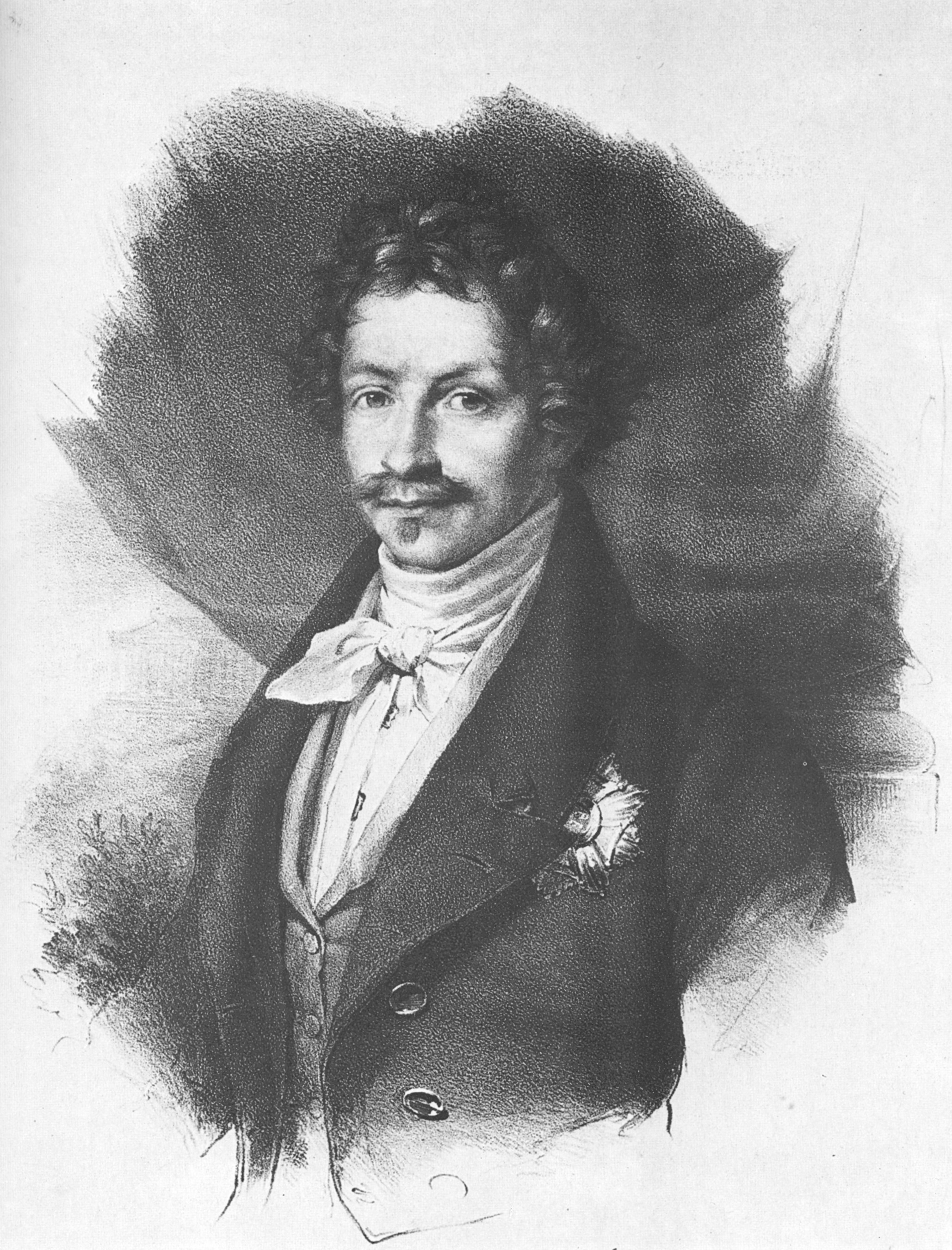
Ludwig I of Bavaria, c. 1830

Ludwig's rule was strongly affected by his enthusiasm for the arts and women and by his overreaching royal assertiveness.

An enthusiast for the German Middle Ages, Ludwig ordered the re-erection of several monasteries in Bavaria that had closed during German mediatisation. He reorganized the administrative regions of Bavaria in 1837 and reintroduced the old names Upper Bavaria, Lower Bavaria, Franconia, Swabia, Upper Palatinate, and Palatinate. He changed his royal titles to Ludwig, King of Bavaria, Duke of Franconia, Duke in Swabia and Count Palatine of the Rhine. His successors kept these titles.

Ludwig's plan to reunite the eastern part of the Palatinate with Bavaria could not be realized. The Electoral Palatinate, a former dominion of the Wittelsbach, had disappeared under Napoleon when France first annexed the left bank of the Rhine, including about half of the Palatinate, and then gave what remained on the right bank, including Mannheim and Heidelberg, to Baden during the German Mediatization of 1803. In 1815, Baden's possession of Manheim and Heidelberg was confirmed and only the left bank territories were returned to Bavaria. Ludwig founded the city of Ludwigshafen there as a Bavarian rival to Mannheim.

Ludwig moved the Ludwig-Maximilians-Universität from Landshut to Munich in 1826. He also encouraged Bavaria's industrialization. He initiated the Ludwig Canal between the rivers Main and the Danube. In 1835 the first German railway was constructed in his domain, between Fürth and Nuremberg. Bavaria joined the Zollverein in 1834.

As Ludwig had supported the Greek fight of independence, his second son, Otto, was elected king of Greece in 1832. Otto's government was initially run by a three-man regency council made up of Bavarian court officials.

After the July Revolution of 1830 in France, Ludwig's previous liberal policy became more and more repressive. The Hambacher Fest in 1832 revealed the discontent of the population caused by high taxes and censorship. In connection with the unrest of May 1832, some 142 political trials were initiated. The seven death sentences that were pronounced were commuted to long-term imprisonment by the king. About 1,000 political trials were to take place during Ludwig's reign. The strict censorship, which he had reinstated after having abolished it in 1825, was opposed by large sectors of the population.

In 1837 the Ultramontanes backed by the Roman Catholic Church gained control of the Bavarian parliament and began a campaign of changes to the constitution, such as removing civil rights that had earlier been granted to Protestants, as well as enforcing political censorship. On 14 August 1838, the King issued an order for all members of the military to kneel in the presence of the Blessed Sacrament at Corpus Christi processions and church services. The policy, which had been in place when Bavaria was still almost purely Catholic before 1803, had been discontinued after the inclusion of large Protestant areas. Catholic disturbances during the funeral of the Protestant Queen Caroline of Baden in 1841 caused a scandal. This treatment of his beloved stepmother permanently softened the attitude of Caroline's stepson Ludwig I, who had been a strong opponent of Protestantism in spite of his marriage to a Protestant princess, Therese of Saxe-Hildburghausen. The Ultramontanes' regime only ended due to their demands against the naturalization of Ludwig I's Irish-born mistress Eliza Gilbert (better known by her stage name Lola Montez). Ludwig resented that move, and the Ultramontanes under Karl von Abel were pushed out.

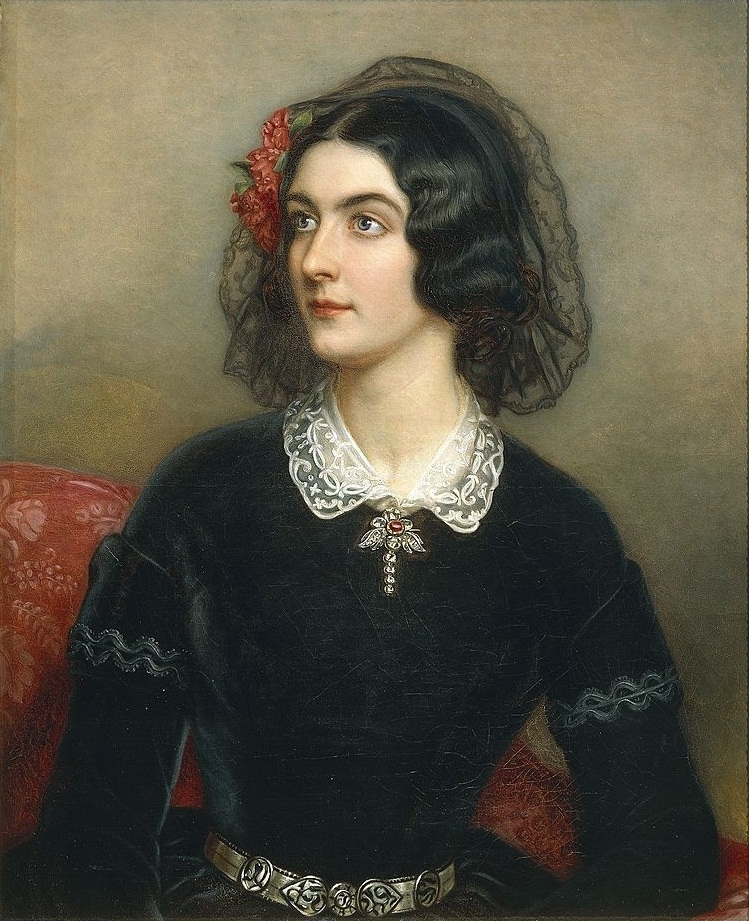
Portrait of Lola Montez by Joseph Karl Stieler, 1847

Already in 1844, Ludwig was confronted with the Beer riots in Bavaria. During the revolutions of 1848 he faced increasing protests and demonstrations by the students and the middle classes. He had ordered the university to close in February, and on 4 March a large crowd assaulted the Armory to storm the Munich Residenz. Ludwig's brother Prince Karl appeased the protesters, but the royal family and the Cabinet now turned against Ludwig. He had to sign the so-called "March Proclamation" with substantial concessions. On 16 March 1848 it was followed by renewed unrest because Montez (his unpopular mistress) had returned to Munich after a short exile. Not willing to rule as a constitutional monarch, Ludwig abdicated on 20 March 1848 in favour of his eldest son, Maximilian.

Ludwig lived for another 20 years after his abdication and remained influential, especially as he continued several of his cultural projects. For most of his time in Munich his residence was the neo-Gothic Wittelsbacher Palais, once built for his successor and unloved by Ludwig. He died at Nice in 1868 and was buried in St. Boniface's Abbey, Munich, which he had ordered to be built.

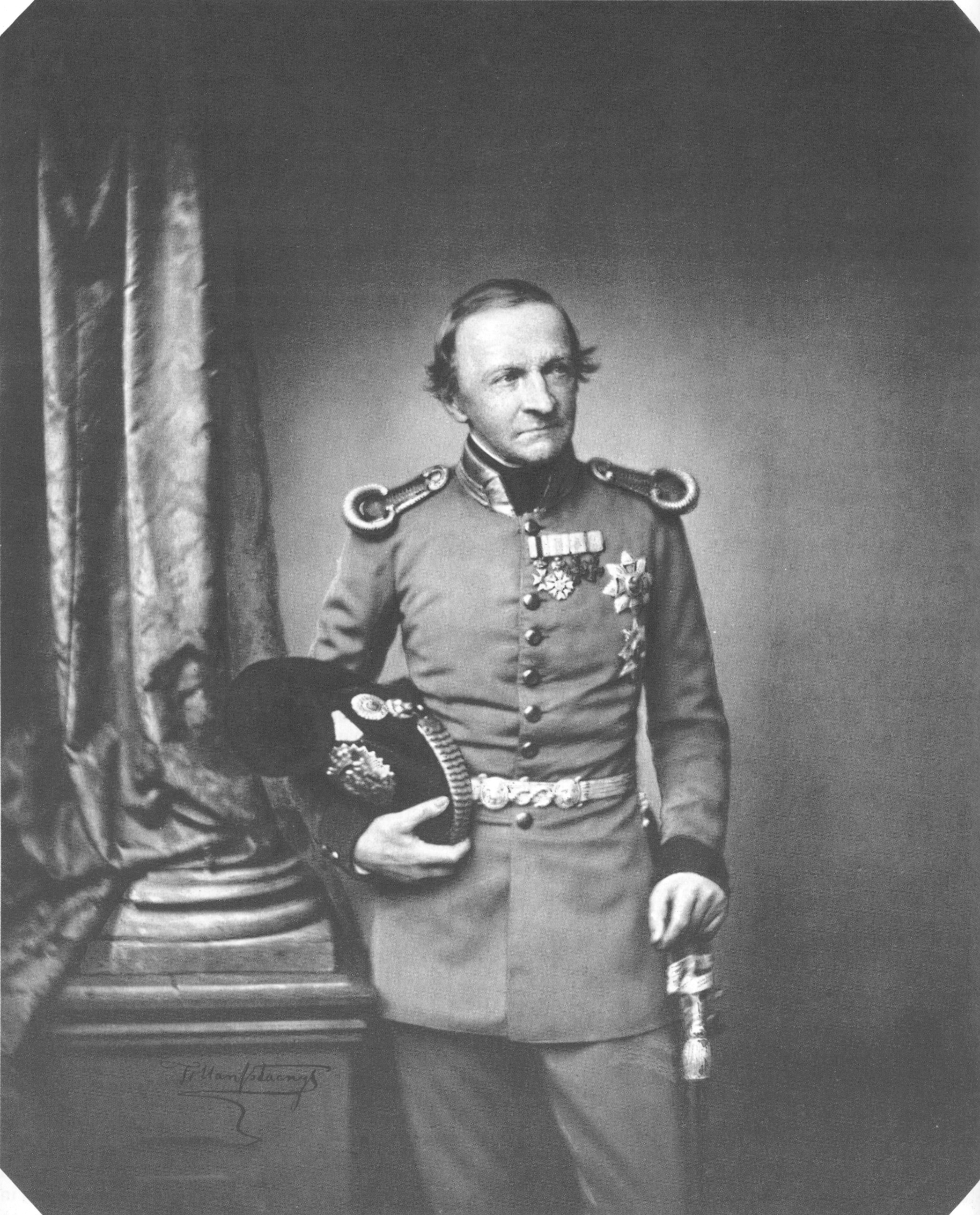
Ludwig I of Bavaria, c. 1860

== Cultural legacy ==
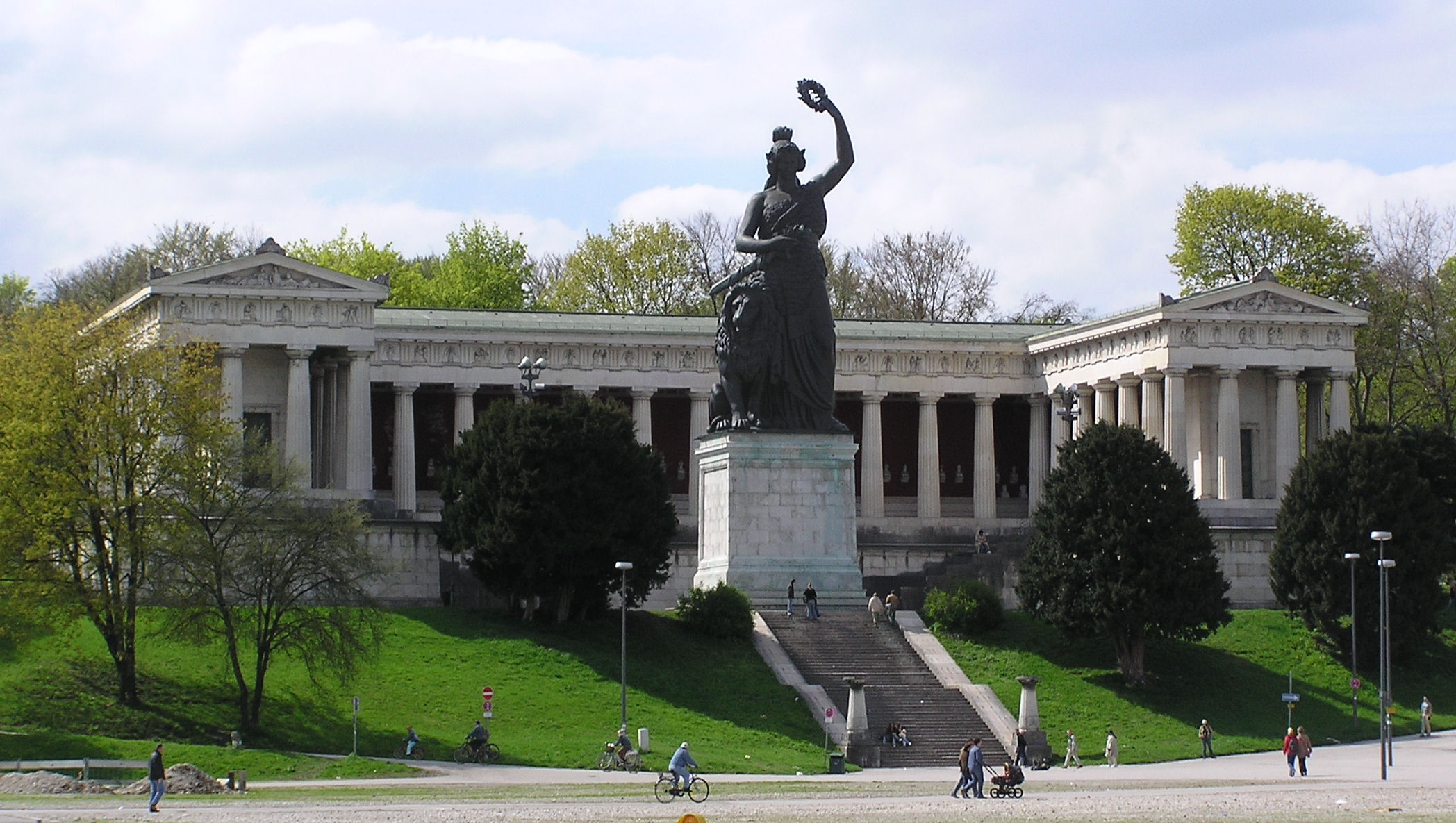
Bavaria with Ruhmeshalle in Munich

As admirer of ancient Greece and the Italian Renaissance, Ludwig patronized the arts as principal of many neoclassical buildings, especially in Munich, and as fanatic collector. Among others he commissioned the Walhalla temple, the Befreiungshalle, the Villa Ludwigshöhe, the Pompejanum, the Ludwigstraße, the Bavaria statue, the Ruhmeshalle, the Glyptothek, the Old and the New Pinakothek. His architects Leo von Klenze and Friedrich von Gärtner also strongly influenced the cityscape of modern Athens.

Already as crown prince Ludwig collected Early German and Early Dutch paintings, masterpieces of the Italian renaissance, and contemporary art for his museums and galleries. He also placed special emphasis on collecting Greek and Roman sculpture. Through his agents, he managed to acquire such pieces as the Medusa Rondanini, the Barberini Faun, and, in 1813, the figures from the Temple of Aphaea on Aegina. One of his most famous conceptions is the celebrated "Schönheitengalerie" (Gallery of Beauties), in the south pavilion of his Nymphenburg Palace in Munich. A collection of 36 portraits of the beautiful women painted between 1827 and 1850 mostly by Joseph Karl Stieler.

Also after his abdication, Ludwig remained an important and lavish sponsor for the arts. This caused several conflicts with his son and successor Maximilian. Finally, Ludwig financed his projects from his own resources.

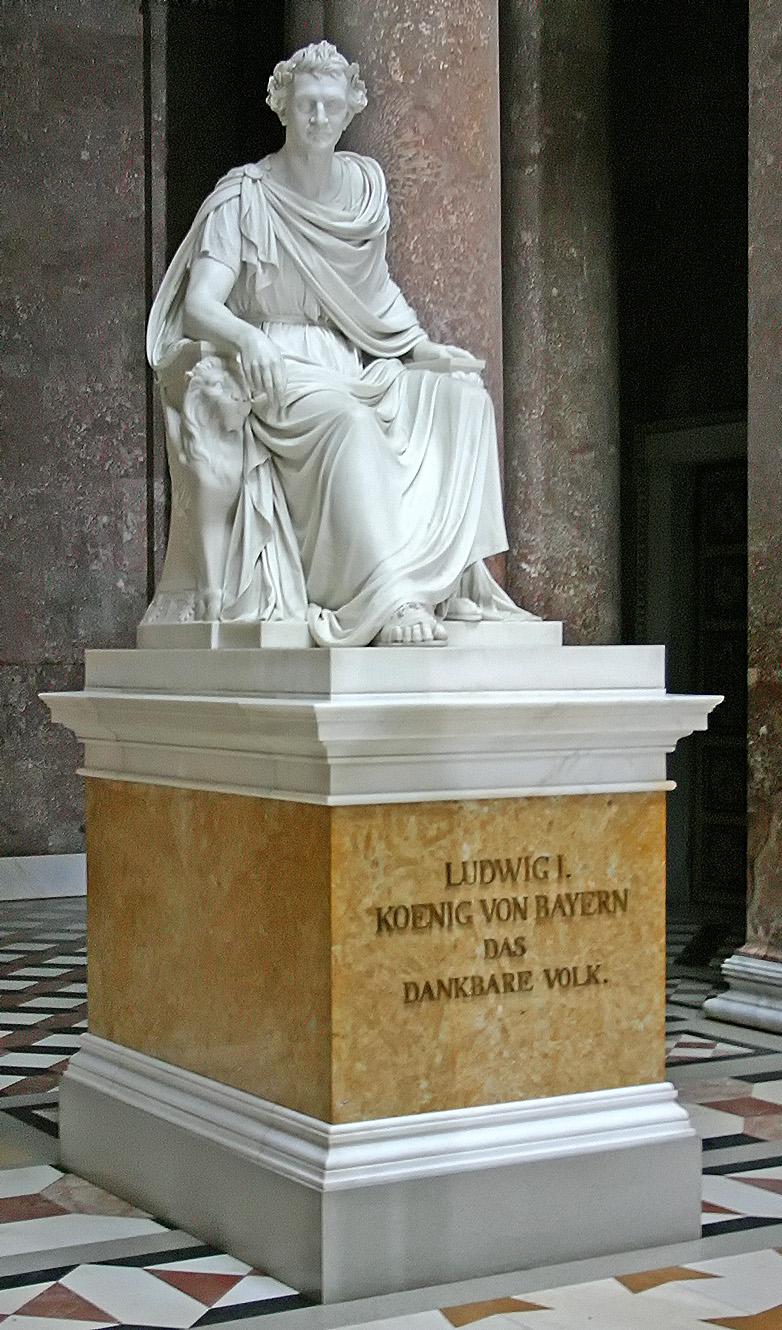
Ludwig I of Bavaria, a monument in the Walhalla

Because of King Ludwig's philhellenism, the German name for Bavaria today is spelled "Bayern" instead of "Baiern", while the German dialect spoken there has retained its original spelling "Bairisch"—note the I versus the Greek-derived Y.

Ludwig was an eccentric and notoriously bad poet. He would write about anything, no matter how trivial, with strings of rhyming couplets. For this, he was teased by Heinrich Heine, who wrote several mocking poems in Ludwig's style. Ironically, Ludwig's Walhalla temple added Heine's bust to its collection in 2009.

== Private life and issue ==
In private life Ludwig was, in spite of his royal assertiveness, modest and companionable and even known for his often shabby attire. Ludwig was hard of hearing and had a birthmark on his forehead that was often concealed in portraits.

Ludwig had several extramarital affairs and was one of the lovers of Jane Digby, an aristocratic English adventuress. Another affair was with the Italian noblewoman Marianna Florenzi. His affair with Lola Montez also caused a scandal.

In 1866, when Queen Emma of Hawaii was visiting Nice, Ludwig proposed marriage to the recently widowed dowager queen, who was 49 years his junior. She refused, writing to her mother: "I met with the King of Bavaria today. He is old and feeble. And he asked me to marry him. I refused saying I will not be marrying."

Issue by Princess Therese of Saxe-Hildburghausen (8 July 1792 – 26 October 1854; married on 12 October 1810 in Theresienwiese, Munich)

Name	Birth	Death	Notes
Maximilian Joseph	28 November 1811	10 March 1864	succeeded as King of Bavaria married, 1842, Princess Marie of Prussia; had issue
Mathilde Karoline Friederike Wilhelmine Charlotte	30 August 1813	25 May 1862	married, 1833, Ludwig III, Grand Duke of Hesse and by Rhine; no issue
Otto Friedrich Ludwig	1 June 1815	26 July 1867	became the first King of Greece married, 1836, Duchess Amalia of Oldenburg; no issue
Theodolinde Charlotte Luise	7 October 1816	12 April 1817	died in infancy
Luitpold Karl Joseph Wilhelm Ludwig	12 March 1821	12 December 1912	Regent of Bavaria married, 1844, Archduchess Augusta of Austria-Tuscany; had issue
Adelgunde Auguste Charlotte Caroline Elisabeth Amalie Marie Sophie Luise	19 March 1823	28 October 1914	married, 1843, Francis V, Duke of Modena; had issue
Hildegard Luise Charlotte Theresia Friederike	10 June 1825	2 April 1864	married, 1844, Archduke Albert of Austria, Duke of Teschen; had issue
Alexandra Amelie	26 August 1826	21 September 1875	never married; no issue
Adalbert Wilhelm Georg Ludwig	19 July 1828	21 September 1875	married, 1856, Infanta Amalia of Spain; had issue

== Arms and honours ==
Greater Coat of Arms of the King of Bavaria (1807-1835)	Greater coat of arms of the King of Bavaria (1835-1918)

- Kingdom of Bavaria:
  - Knight of the Order of St. Hubert, 1799
  - Grand Prior of the Royal Bavarian House Equestrian Order of St. George, 1801
  - Grand Cross of the Military Order of Max Joseph
  - Grand Cross of the Order of Merit of the Bavarian Crown
  - Founder of the Royal Order of Ludwig, 25 August 1827
- French Empire: Grand Eagle of the Legion of Honour, 1806/07
- Kingdom of Saxony: Knight of the Order of the Rue Crown, 1808
- Baden: Grand Cross of the House Order of Fidelity, 1812
- Austrian Empire:
  - Grand Cross of the Royal Hungarian Order of St. Stephen, 1816
  - Knight of the Order of the Golden Fleece, 1825
- Württemberg: Grand Cross of the Order of the Württemberg Crown, 1818
- Denmark: Knight of the Order of the Elephant, 8 November 1825
- Kingdom of Prussia: Knight of the Order of the Black Eagle, 17 December 1825
- Russian Empire: Knight of the Order of St. Andrew, March 1826
- Grand Duchy of Hesse: Grand Cross of the Ludwig Order, 10 August 1826
- Kingdom of Greece: Grand Cross of the Order of the Redeemer, 1833
- Kingdom of Portugal:
  - Grand Cross of the Royal Military Order of Our Lord Jesus Christ, 25 March 1835
  - Grand Cross of the Order of the Tower and Sword, 25 March 1835
- (Saxe-Coburg and Gotha) (Duchy of Saxe-Altenburg) (Saxe-Meiningen) Ernestine duchies: Grand Cross of the Saxe-Ernestine House Order, May 1836
- Belgium: Grand Cordon of the Order of Leopold, 12 March 1840
- Oldenburg: Grand Cross of the House and Merit Order of Peter Frederick Louis, with Golden Crown, 1 July 1841
- Sweden-Norway: Knight of the Royal Order of the Seraphim, 28 September 1844
- Ascanian duchies: Grand Cross of the Order of Albert the Bear, 28 January 1854
- Duchy of Modena and Reggio: Grand Cross of the Order of the Eagle of Este, 1856
- Mexican Empire: Grand Cross of the Order of the Mexican Eagle, 1865
- Grand Duchy of Tuscany: Grand Cross of the Order of St. Joseph
- Two Sicilies:
  - Knight of the Order of Saint Januarius, 1829
  - Grand Cross of the Order of St. Ferdinand and Merit

== Ancestry ==
Ancestors of Ludwig I of Bavaria

8. Christian III, Count Palatine of Zweibrücken
4. Frederick Michael, Count Palatine of Zweibrücken
9. Countess Caroline of Nassau-Saarbrücken
2. Maximilian I Joseph of Bavaria
10. Joseph Charles, Hereditary Prince of Sulzbach
5. Countess Palatine Maria Franziska of Sulzbach
11. Countess Palatine Elisabeth Auguste Sofie of Neuburg
1. Ludwig I of Bavaria
12. Louis VIII, Landgrave of Hesse-Darmstadt
6. Prince George William of Hesse-Darmstadt
13. Countess Charlotte of Hanau-Lichtenberg
3. Princess Augusta Wilhelmine of Hesse-Darmstadt
14. Count Christian Karl Reinhard of Leiningen-Dagsburg-Falkenburg
7. Countess Maria Louise Albertine of Leiningen-Dagsburg-Falkenburg
15. Countess Katharina Polyxena of Solms-Rödelheim

== See also ==
- Ann O'Delia Diss Debar, claimed to be the daughter of Ludwig and Lola Montez
- King Ludwig Oak, monument named after Ludwig

== Sources ==
- Heinz Gollwitzer, Ludwig I. von Bayern. Königtum im Vormärz, Munich 1986 (²1997).

Ludwig I of Bavaria House of Wittelsbach Born: 25 August, 1786 Died: 29 February, 1868
Regnal titles
Preceded by Maximilian I Joseph	King of Bavaria; 1825–1848	Succeeded by Maximilian II
