= King Ludwig Oak =

Natural monument in Germany

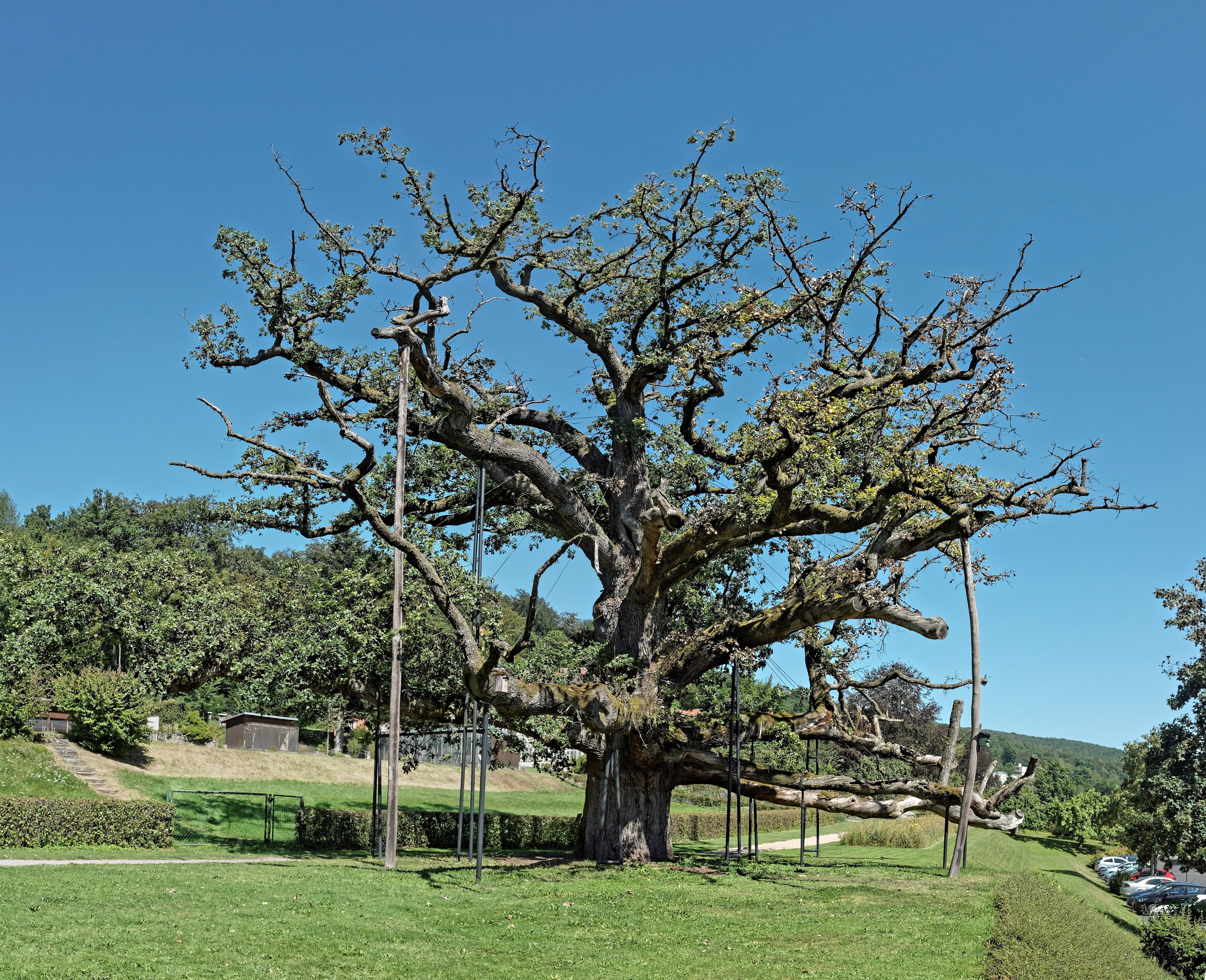
- King Ludwig Oak (also known as Königseiche) seen from the southwest

- Location within Germany
- Native name: König-Ludwig-Eiche (German)
- Species: European oak (Quercus robur)
- Location: Staatsbad Brückenau, Bad Brückenau, Germany
- Coordinates: 50°18′14.2″N 9°44′43.1″E
- Height: 17 m (56 ft)
- Diameter: 26 m (85 ft) (crown)
- Custodian: Lower Nature Conservation Authority of the Bad Kissingen district

The King Ludwig Oak (in German: König-Ludwig-Eiche, and also Königseiche, Tausendjährige Eiche, and until the middle of the 19th century, Stolze Eiche) is an oak tree recognised as a natural monument in the Staatsbad Brückenau, a state-run spa and park two kilometres (1.2 mi) west of Bad Brückenau in the German state of Bavaria. The German Tree Archive counts the oak among the trees of national importance (National bedeutsamer Baum, NBB).

Estimates of its age range between 370 and 700 years. The circumference of the trunk is about seven metres (23 ft). It is named after King Ludwig I, who frequented it during his numerous spa stays at the Staatsbad Brückenau. The oak has been described and depicted many times since 1780. Many domestic aristocrats and monarchs from abroad who were staying in Brückenau for the cure visited the oak.

== Location ==
The King Ludwig Oak stands in the Sinn river valley at the foot of the Dreistelzberg mountain, at an elevation of about 300 metres (980 ft), in Staatsbad Brückenau, Bad Brückenau, Germany. Until the 20th century, the spa gardens of Brückenau surrounded the tree. Due to landscape changes it is now the edge of the park near an open space, about 10 metres (33 ft) above the Sinn. A hiking trail with information boards leads past the oak. Almost the entire spa area can be seen from its elevated position. The central spa area with the Kursaal building, the spa hotel, and the foyer, lie about 200 metres (660 ft) southeast of the oak. In between, state road 3180 runs from Staatsbad to the Züntersbach district.

King Ludwig I resided at the Fürstenhof during his spa stays. Built in 1775 as the summer residence of Prince-Bishop Heinrich von Bibra, the Fürstenhof is now the Fürstenhof Palace Hotel. It is about 150 metres (490 ft) northeast of the oak. To the north, there is a small zoo in the old castle nursery and to the east is a herb garden. Several villas and a Protestant church were built to the west around 1900.

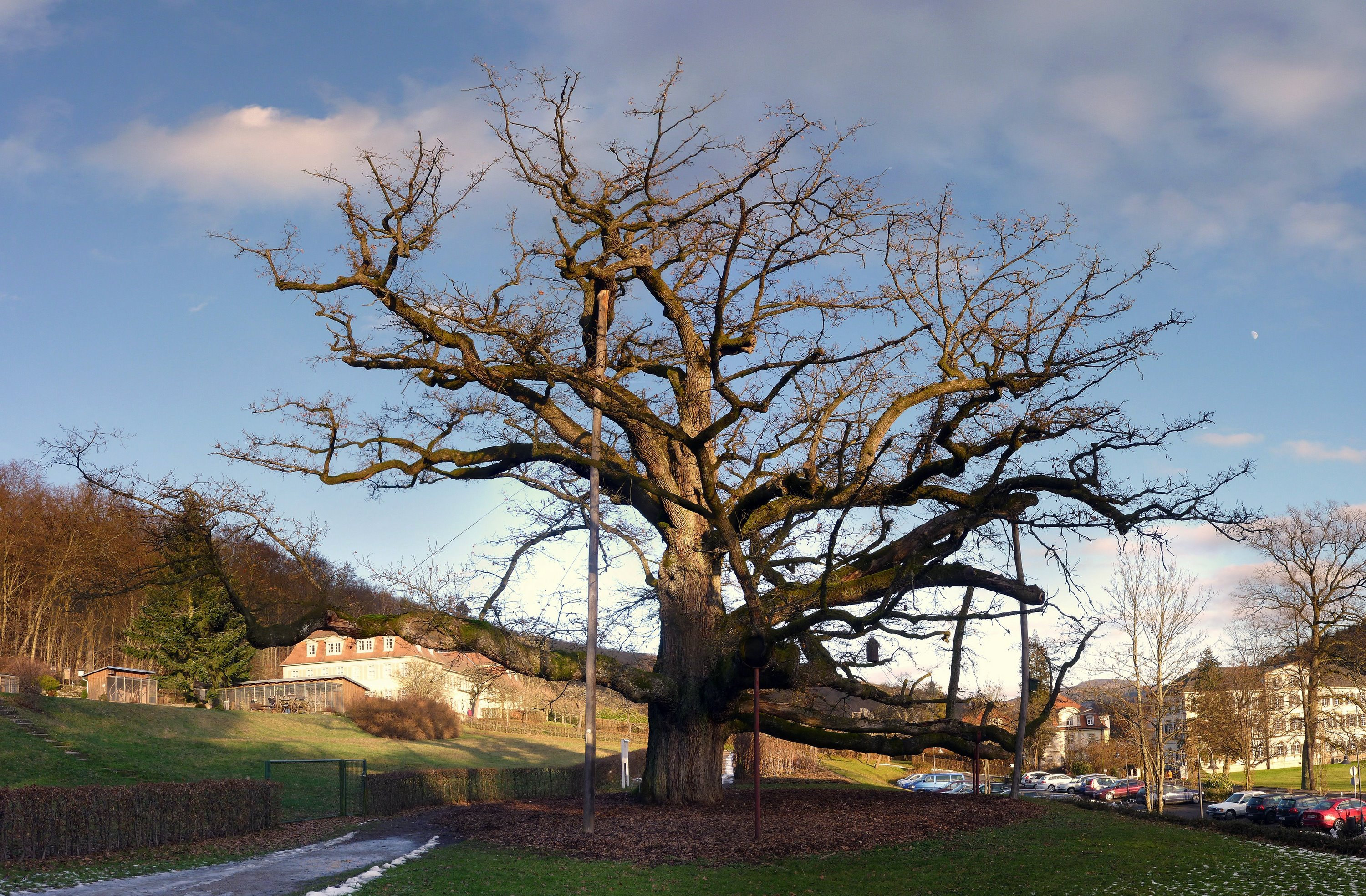
View from the west, left behind the Fürstenhof

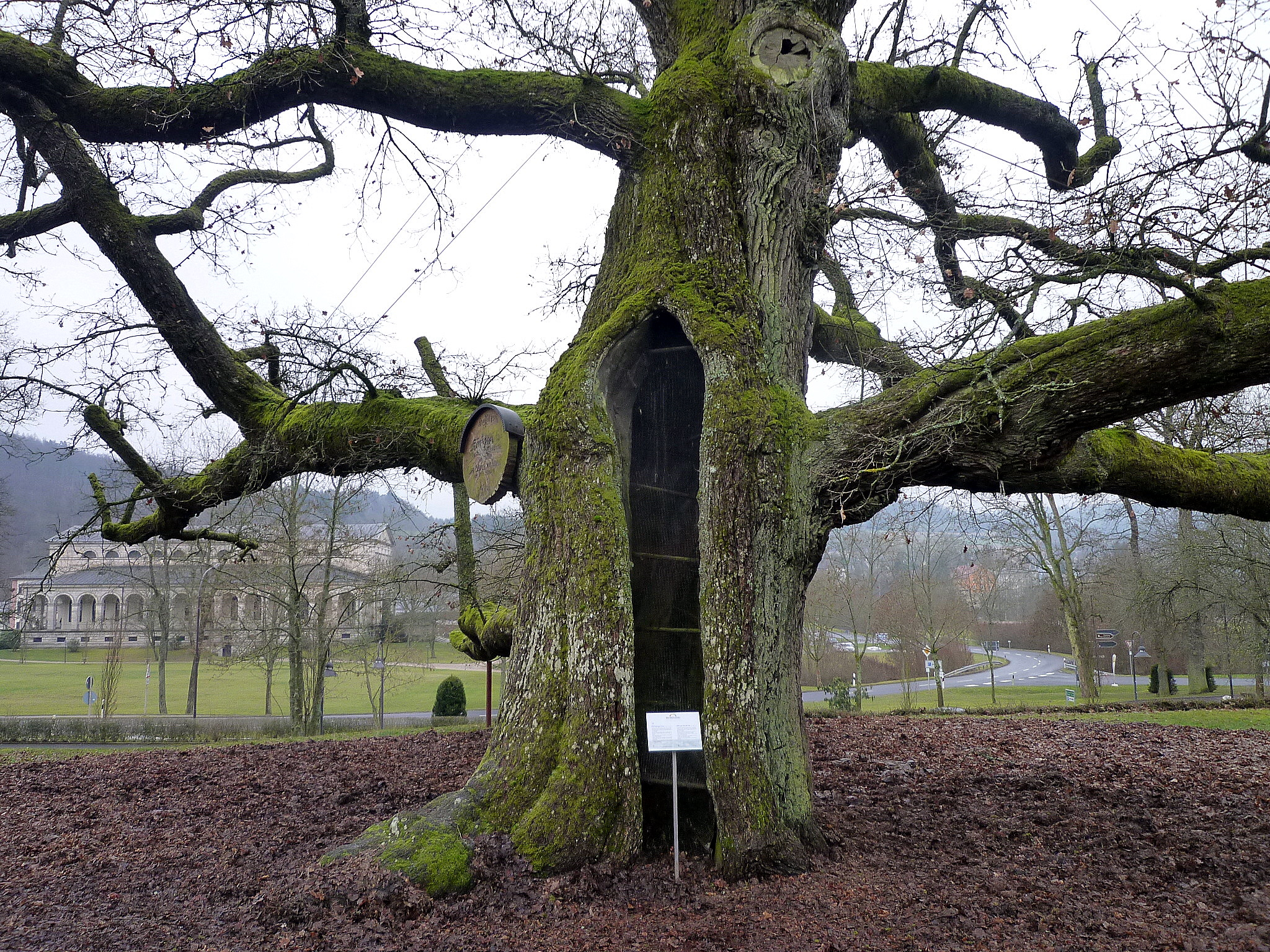
Open trunk from the north, with information board in front of it

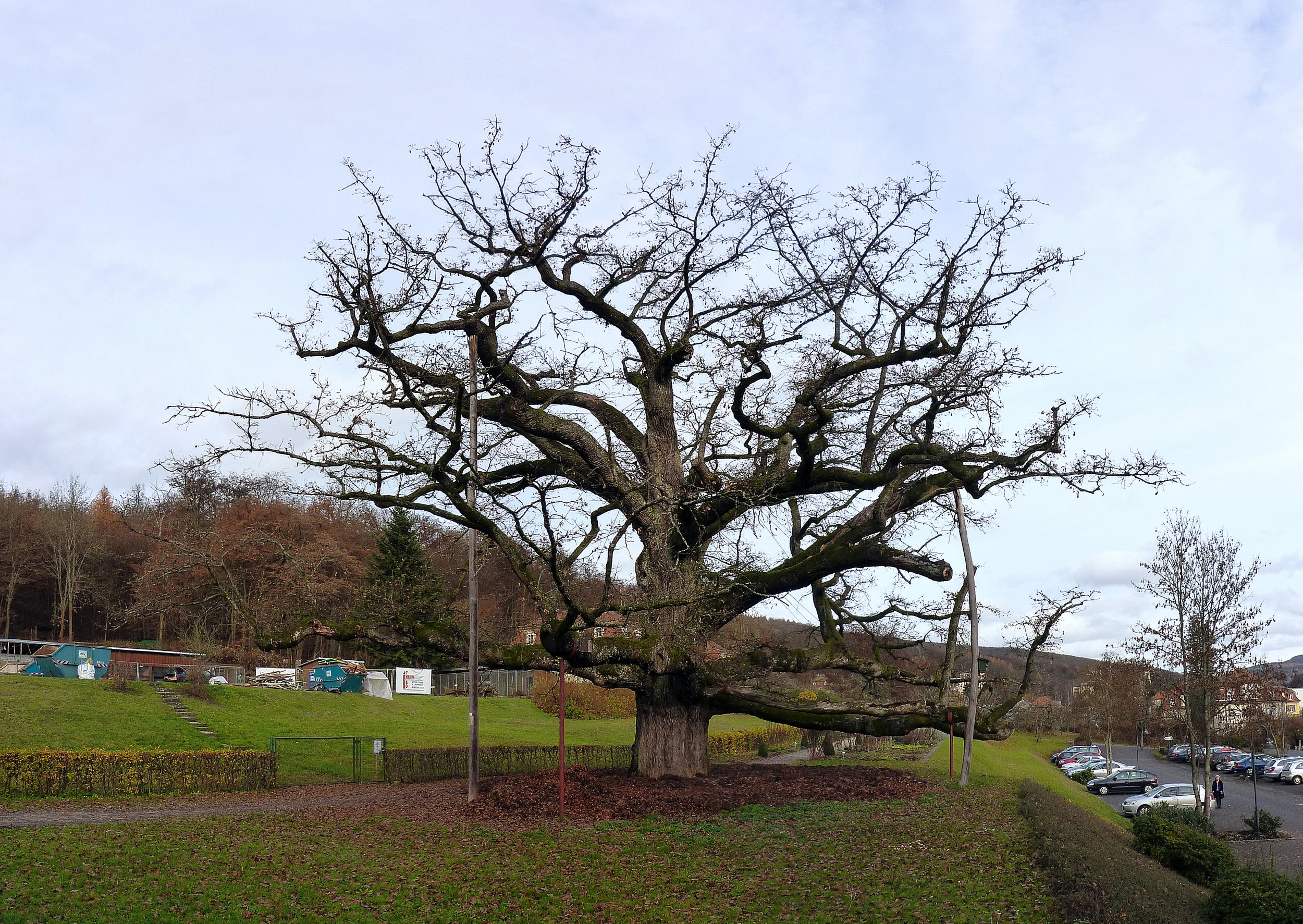
View from the southwest

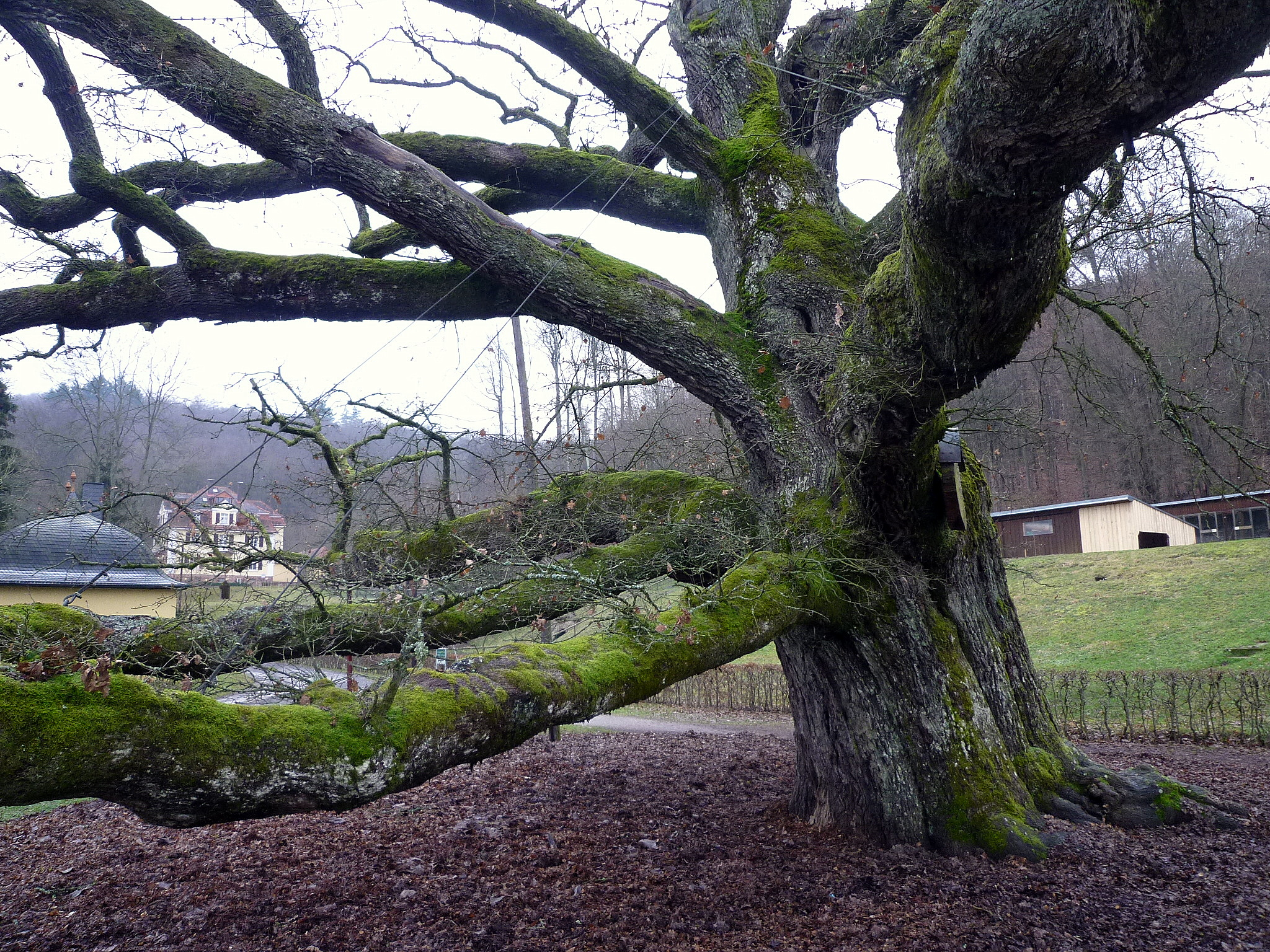
Branches branching horizontally, the ground covered with a layer of leaves

== Description ==
The Lower Nature Conservation Authority of the Bad Kissingen district listed the oak, known as the royal oak, as a natural monument on March 2, 1987, with the number 672-N/009. The royal oak appears extremely asymmetrical in the lower part of the crown. In the past, the surrounding area served the spa guests as a place to celebrate, play, dance, and rest. One hundred years ago the tree's crown had a diameter of 45 metres (148 ft). Over 100 seats could be arranged in the 1,500-square-metre (16,000 sq ft) area underneath the foliage. In order not to further burden the oak, no more festivals are held there. If the information in the sources is correct, it would have been the largest of all the old oaks in Germany with a crown diameter of 45 metres (148 ft). Currently, the crown's diameter is only about 30 metres (98 ft) at a height of 23 metres (75 ft), as some branches have been cut.

Five branches extend horizontally on one side at a height of about four metres (13 ft) and, like other branches of the crown, are heavily mossed on the top. They lie on three iron rods and two wooden poles to relieve the pressure from their mass. The tapering trunk strives vertically up to a height of about 20 metres (66 ft). It is inclined at about 20 degrees in the direction at which most of the main horizontal branches branch off. Oaks supported by poles are extremely rare, in contrast to the drawn and supported dance linden trees. The Femeiche in Erle (about twelve metres (39 ft) trunk circumference), the Lenzeiche near Sichertshausen (about 6.5 metres (21 ft) trunk circumference), and the royal oak are the only supported oaks of this size in Germany. A hundred years ago it still had more than ten supports and the height of its growth; the trunk was still completely closed, and the crown densely branched. Six branches at about the same height formed a wreath. It is not known when the supports were first installed. King Ludwig I campaigned for the care of the oak during his spa stays in Brückenau. Presumably, the first supports were installed then, the oldest description of which dates from 1838.

When the longest horizontal branch at 22 metres (72 ft) broke out in the 1960s, a deep gap formed in the trunk on the north side. The branch had been provided with an iron ring that was supposed to hold it together. The ring had grown into the branch until it finally burst and 84 annual rings were counted around the ingrown iron ring.

The trunk is completely hollow and has a 4-metre (13 ft) high and 0.6-metre (2 ft 0 in) wide crack, which appeared after the large branch broke out. It is closed with a close-knit wire mesh. Some of the supported old branches are also hollow, and the upper walls are partly missing, so they consist only of a half-shell made of bark material. In addition to the supports, the oak is secured with a crown made up of about 20 steel cables that radiate from the main axis to the horizontal side branches. It is a static crown protection in which the branches are braced to the trunk by the steel cables. The ropes are attached to threaded rods that have been drilled through the branches and lead to the partially ingrown retaining eyes that are screwed into the trunk. Since the hot summer of 2003, the previously small amount of dead wood, which is regularly cut out, has increased; the oak's declining vitality noticeable.

=== Inscriptions ===
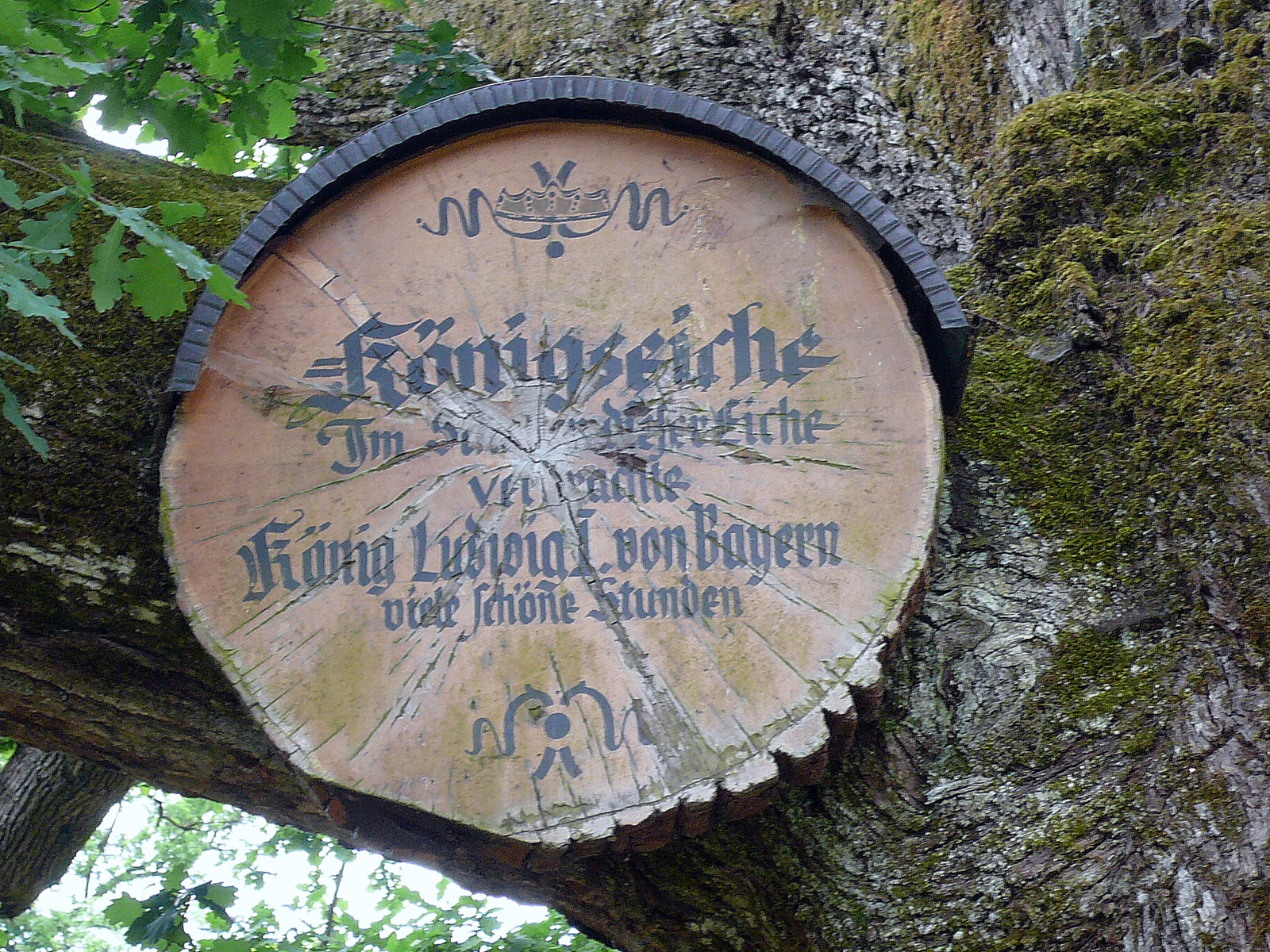
Wooden plaque with inscription

A wooden plaque with the following inscription is attached to the oak (English translation from German):

King Oak
In the shadow of this oak
spent
King Ludwig I of Bavaria
many happy hours

The inscription on the previous plaque read (in German):

Königseiche (die Zierde des Bades),
Lieblingsplatz weiland S. M. König Ludwig I. 1818–1862

=== Trunk diameter ===
In 2011, the completely hollow trunk had a circumference of 6.81 metres (22.3 feet) at the point of its smallest diameter and a height of 7.11 metres (23.3 ft) at 1 metre (3 ft 3 in). In 2000, the German Tree Archives indicated a circumference of 6.68 metres (21.9 ft) at the point of the smallest diameter, and in 2001, a height of 7.00 metres (22.97 ft). In 2016, the trunk had at 1.3 metres (4 ft 3 in), the height of the so-called breast height diameter (BHD), a circumference of 7.00 metres (22.97 feet) and at 1.5 m (4 ft 11 in), a circumference of 6.90 metres (22.6 ft). In 1912, it was 5.70 metres (18.7 ft) at the same height. According to records the circumference has increased by around 1.2 metres (3 ft 11 in) over the past 100 years, an average of 1.2 centimetres (0.47 in) a year. This roughly coincides with measurements at the point of smallest diameter in 1991 with 6.6 metres (22 ft) and in 2016 with 6.79 metres (22.3 ft). An increase in circumference of 19 centimetres (7.5 in) in 26 years corresponds to a little less than 1 centimetre (0.39 in) per year. Because of the nutrient-poor soil substrate and the supported crown, the oak grows somewhat more slowly than most of its species of comparable size, for which the annual increase in circumference is around 1.8 centimetres (0.71 in) to 2 centimetres (0.79 in). It grew at a similarly slow rate between 1804 and 1996, with an annual increase in circumference of 1.16 centimetres (0.46 in). The largest oak is at the zoo near Ivenack. It measures over 12 metres (39 ft) in circumference, is about 800 years old, and is the strongest oak in Germany at 140 metres (460 feet), and the most massive in Europe.

=== Age ===
Different information is available about the oak's age. The Lower Nature Conservation Authority estimates it to be 400–600 years old. In 2000, the forest scientist, Hans Joachim Fröhlich estimated its age at 700 years and the German Tree Archive in 2009 estimated it to be between 360 and 420 years old. Sometimes its age is given at 1000 or even 1500 years; however, this is likely to be too high. Since the oldest wood is missing in the centre of the trunk, annual ring counting with the help of a drill core or by drilling resistance measurement using a resistograph, and radiocarbon dating is impossible. The actual age can only be estimated roughly based on the size of the trunk and convention. Because of the increase in circumference of around 1.2 centimetres (0.47 in) per year over the past hundred years, the age of the oak should be set at a maximum of 500 years, provided it has not grown more slowly in its younger years than in the last hundred years because of unfavourable growth conditions. The count on a branch trimmed in the outer crown area in 2007, which had solid wood to the middle, resulted in around 300 annual rings. However, it is not known when the oak formed this branch. About 120 years ago, there was an abrupt change in the annual ring width. Since then, the annual rings are only about half as far apart from one another as before.

== History ==
=== Oldest traditions ===
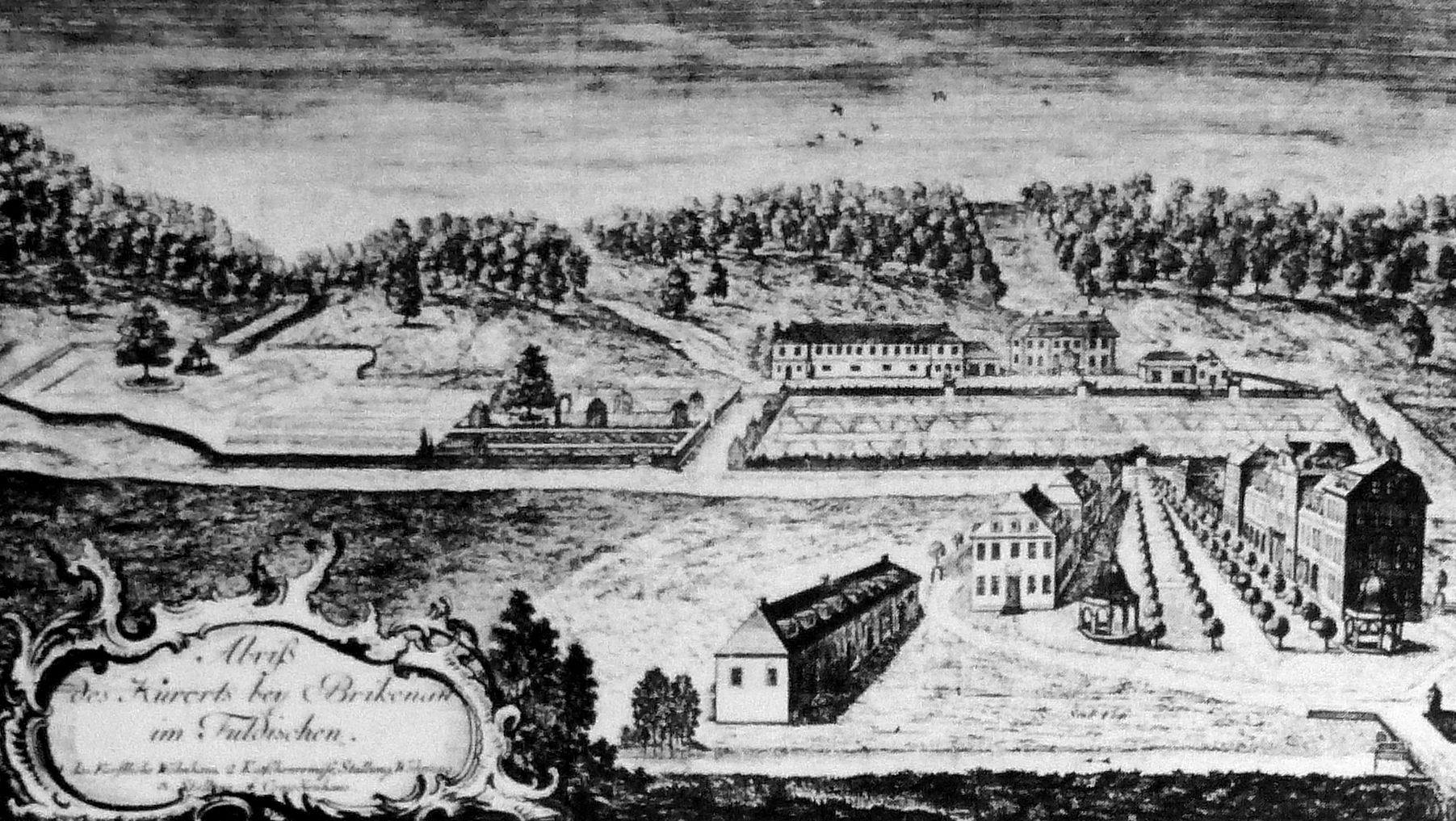
Copper engraving from 1780 by Egid Verhelst with the spa facilities of the state bath and the oak in the centre left

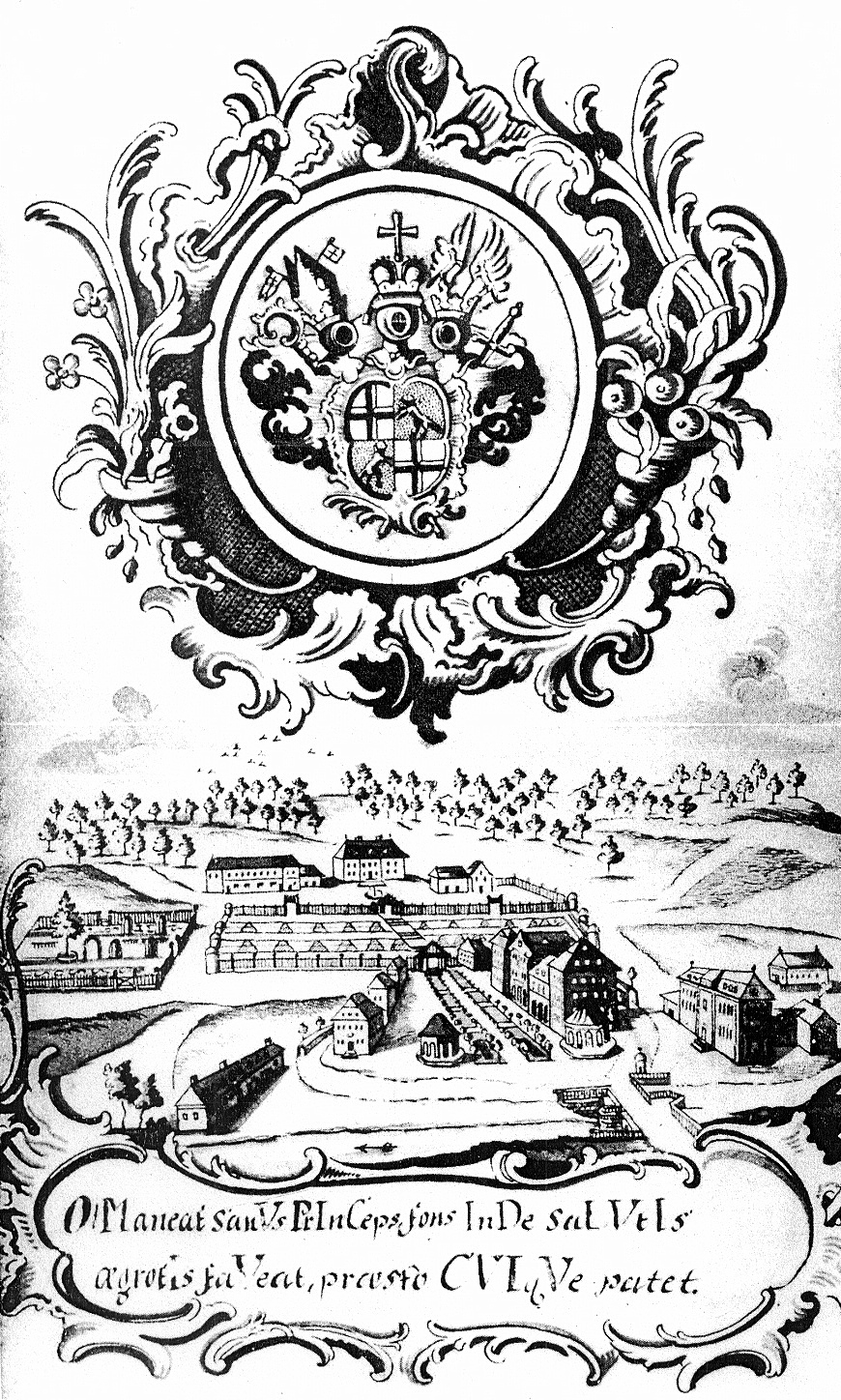
Sketch of the state bath from 1781 with the oak on the left edge of the picture

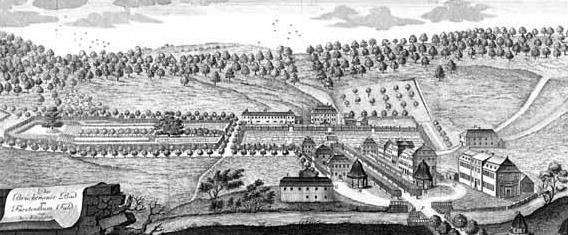
Copper engraving from 1790 by Egid Verhelst with the spa facilities of the state bath and the oak in the center left

In 1747, the Fulda Prince Abbot Amand von Buseck founded the spa following the discovery of the medicinal properties of the waters. This was the beginning of the spa business at Fulda. When the spa's gardens were designed, an open space was left around the oak tree, to which one of the main paths leads. The second half of the 18th century saw the first heyday of the spa business, as is evident from numerous descriptions. The oak is mentioned and depicted in many of these reports. On an engraving by the artist Egid Verhelst from 1780, the oak is shown with a pointed, high-reaching crown. This is the oldest known pictorial representation of the tree. The oldest description, in which it is referred to as a "proud oak", also comes from the year 1780. The spa's doctor, Melchior Adam Weikard, wrote at that time:

Here there are beautiful corridors, paths painted green, various niches, everything covered with flowers. The first main course leads to the proud oak that stands in the middle of the garden and really cuts a splendid figure. Around them run lawn benches, at some distance star-shaped slats with canopies, so that more than a hundred people can sit here at the same time under the shade of the beautiful oak. When I sit here alone or in company under this proud tree, and have something important, indifferent, or nothing to think about, in the end my attention generally falls on the beauty of oak, and I would always like something to praise.

— Melchior Adam Weikard, Neueste Nachricht von den Mineralwässern bei Brückenau im Fuldischen (1780), English translation

Leopold Friedrich Günther von Goeckingk, a poet, wrote in 1782 in the Deutsches Museum, a magazine for literature, art, and public life:

The gardens that the prince had laid out in front of his house on the hill are also pleasant walks, because here you have a different view. I particularly notice two places, beautiful by two aged oaks that shade them. One stands in the middle of the garden; Around them run lawn benches, at some distance star-shaped slats with canopies, so that more than a hundred people can sit here at the same time in the shade of the beautiful tree. The other oak stands about 100 meters from the other, a little higher, because from there you can overlook the health resort, the village of Wernarz and the area of Brückenau. The area around is quiet because it is the outermost tip of what has been cultivated, the forest is close by, and a passage in a narrow green valley, which also serves as a disc stand, leads lonely there. Under these oaks, especially under the first, breakfasts (déjeunés) were sometimes given by one or the other of the cure guests, in which all foreigners took part.

— Leopold Friedrich Günther von Goeckingk, Von dem Kurbrunnen bei Brückenau im Fuldischen (1782), English translation

Two years later, in 1784, he wrote in the monthly journal Journal von und für Deutschland:

Also a proud oak deserves to be admired, under its shade more than a hundred people on the lawn benches and canapés around it find.

The oak can be recognized on other copper engravings from the state bath from the end of the 18th and the following centuries. A revised engraving by Verhelst from 1790 shows it with a large, hemispherical crown. Christian von Eggers wrote in 1810 in Journey through Franconia, Bavaria, Austria, Prussia and Saxony about his journey to Brückenau in 1804:

There are beautiful avenues in the garden, which is used for general walks. I noticed a very large oak, eight cubits in circumference, with an extremely broad top. It amply shadows the seats in the round.

=== Ludwig era ===
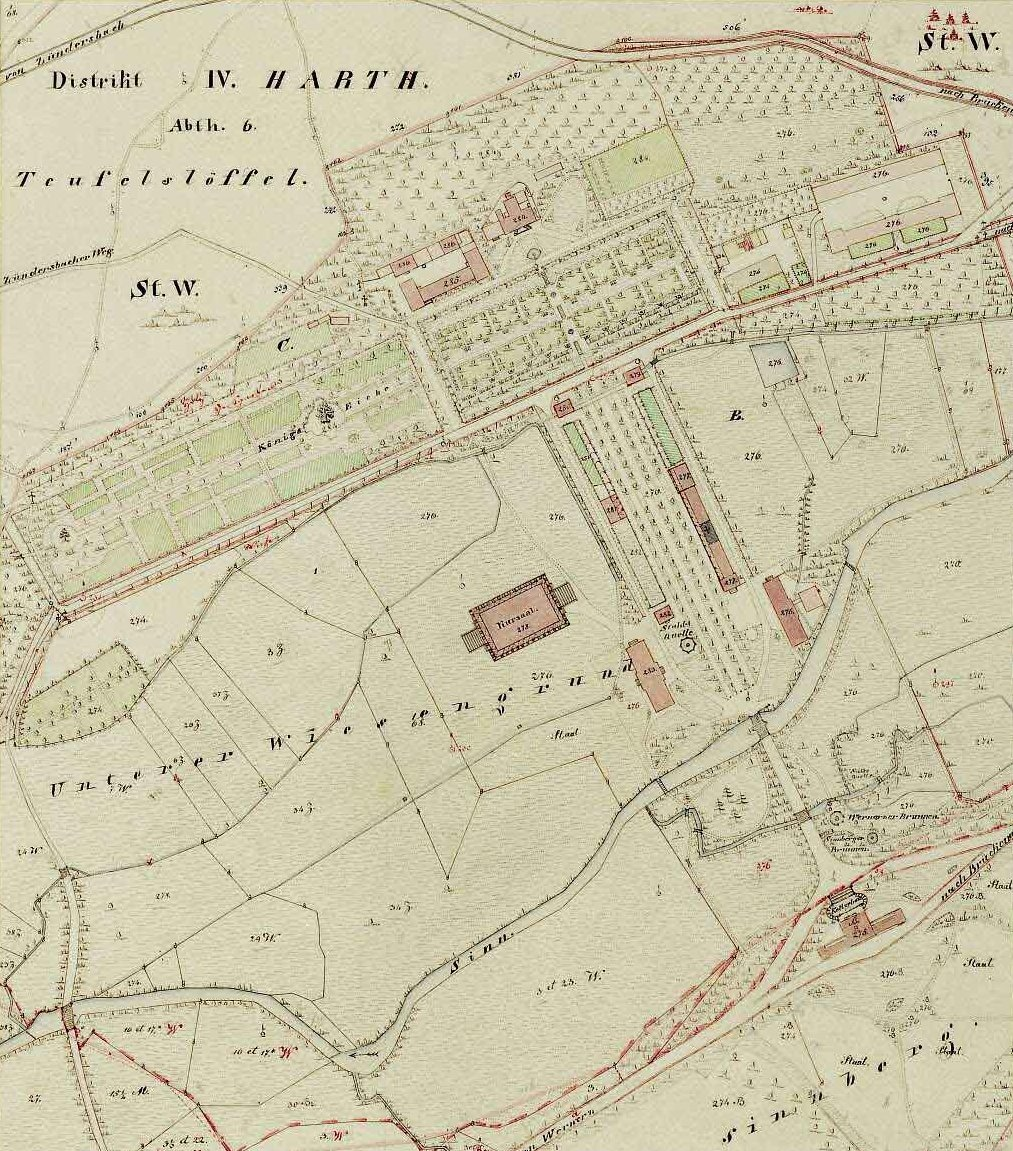
Ortsblatt Brückenau from 1848 with the oak tree on the left above the middle

After several changes of rulership, Brückenau was awarded to the Kingdom of Bavaria by the Congress of Vienna in 1816. One of the first views of the Bavarian spa from 1817/1818 was made by the architectural painter Domenico Quaglio, who depicted the oak with a large crown in a watercolour. In 1818, Crown Prince Ludwig of Bavaria visited the state bath for the first time. He was a patron of the arts and sciences and in the same year placed the deciduous forests and especially the old oaks in the Staatsbad Brückenau under his special protection. During his total of 26 often months-long spa stays between 1818 and 1862 in Brückenau (from 1825 as King of Bavaria), he regularly visited the royal oak and rested under it. In 1822, the doctor Johann Evangelist Wetzler wrote in Gesundbrunnen and Heilbäder:

Between these buildings and those on the plain, the mentioned gardens with shady arches and arbors spread out, the fruit trees are pyramidal in shape, all the slats are painted green. The ornament of these gardens, however, is a giant oak with tremendously horizontal branches, in whose shade there is space for more than 100 people. Here is the favorite spot of the spa guests; great festivals were often held here; people danced and raved about here and there. From there you get into the forest, where you can take pleasant walks.

— Johann Evangelist Wetzler, Ueber Gesundbrunnen und Heilbäder überhaupt, oder über deren Nutzen, Einrichtung und Gebrauch (1822), English translation

On July 29, 1840, Ludwig I, who was later accompanied by his grandson, the later King of Bavaria and art lover Ludwig II, wrote the poem "Under the oak tree in the Bad Brückenau" (in German: Unter der großen Eiche im Bade Brückenau):

Under the oak tree in the Bad Brückenau

I sat musing, was surrounded
by the wreath of
flowers, noble life poured out
in the sun, joyful shine

Under the lofty oak,
the centuries seen, they spoke
from every branch,
felt them rise again.

Nice days in German prehistoric times,
steps up again,
And the legend became
true, The chorus was deeper.

Freyer feels it in the Freye,
the song sounds mighty,
man receives consecration,
sees what he otherwise does not see.

German under the German oak,
the German sense rises,
great prehistoric old witness interwoven
with the present.

Tighter is knotted together
Since the sacred bond of unity,
higher since the flames of love
burn for the fatherland

— (Translation of Unter der großen Eiche im Bade Brückenau), Ludwig I, 1840

During the first comprehensive survey in the then Kingdom of Bavaria in the years 1808 to 1853, the oak was registered on the Bad Brückenau—NW CIV 56 original sheet from November 1848 with the field number 284 and the name Königseiche.

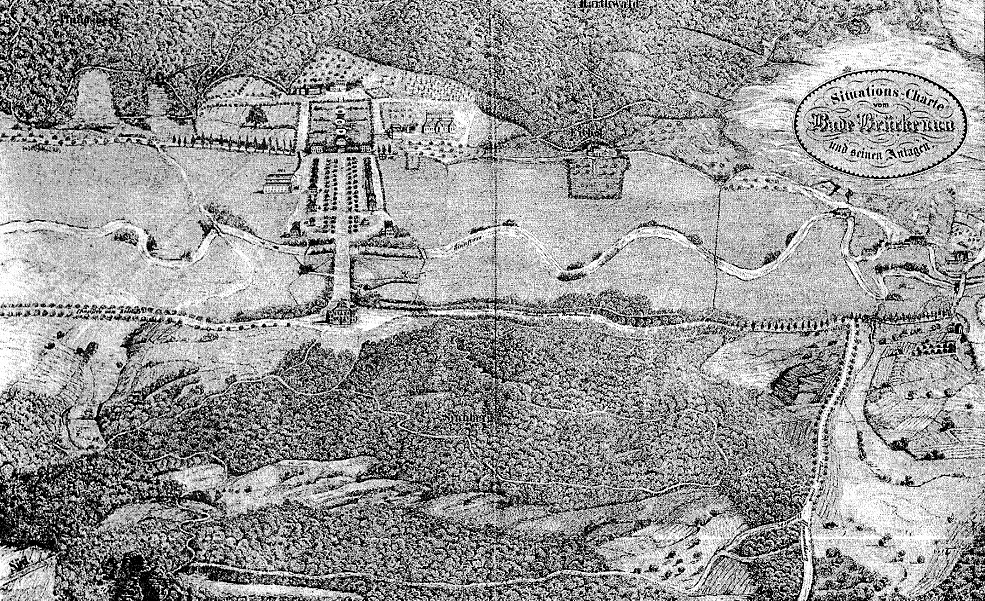
Map of the state bath around 1850 with the oak in the upper left corner

The spa in Brückenau enjoyed a second heyday from the middle to the end of the 19th century, when numerous monarchs from abroad came for the cure and visited the tree. King Maximilian II stayed under the oak in 1856 and Queen Amalie of Greece in 1873 during their longer spa stays in Brückenau. Other visitors to the spa and the oak in 1857 were the widow of the Tsarina Alexandra Feodorovna, the Tsarina Marija Alexandrovna, and the Queen of Bavaria, Marie Friederike.

The gardener and garden writer Hermann Jäger wrote in the newspaper in 1861 to disseminate scientific knowledge and view of nature for readers of all levels:

I know an oak near Brückenau at the southern foot of the Rhön Mountains, which has a trunk diameter of 4 feet and no dry branch yet relatively young (200 years old), the leafy branches with their 35 forms a crown 125 feet in diameter, that is even more "than the strong oak in France".(English translation)

=== Luitpold period ===
In 1897, Prince Regent Luitpold unveiled a memorial in Brückenau in honour of his father Ludwig I. At the Königseiche, he drank a glass of wine toasting a successful future for Brückenau. Empress Elisabeth of Austria also stayed there for four weeks in 1898. The first detailed description of the oak dates from 1900. The tree photographer Friedrich Stützer, inspector of the royal Bavarian state railway in Munich, wrote in his tree book The largest, oldest or otherwise strange trees in Bavaria in words and pictures:

The royal oak in the spa garden at Brückenau

"[...] the royal oak at Brückenau, in its full, unbroken strength and beauty, an outstanding tree ornament of the much-visited health resort, has that consecration with the king's name no less because of the fact that the king often and gladly stayed under its shady canopy received, which the axe will keep away from her forever. In the present, she already lives up to this name by her appearance, because her stature is majestic! Her crown spreads out like a wide green canopy. The trunk with a circumference of 5 ⅓ meters sends out from a height of 4 meters from giant branches of almost half the thickness of the trunk, in partly horizontal, partly slightly upward growth up to 22 meters in length! On these branches, as the leafless image of the oak shows, formal tree trunks grow upwards again; This can be seen particularly clearly on a branch on the left of the picture [see view by Josef Bott from 1899] reaching almost to the summit. In order to prevent the risk of breaking the lower branches, they are often supported with columns. One will find this concern doubly comprehensible when one learns that the total weight of the tree in summery abundance of leaves and fruit is no less than 1000. Center calculated. The wood mass including branches and roots would result in approx. 50 . When the sun is at its highest, the almost circular treetop with an average diameter of 45 meters shades an area of 1500 square meters . Hardly any other bathing resort will be able to boast such an airy green convertible tent that protects against sun and rain!"

— Friedrich Stützer, The largest, oldest or otherwise strange trees in Bavaria in words and pictures (1901), English translation

The oak was shown on postcards from around 1900. At the turn of the century and in the years after, the number of supports used in the tree fluctuated. In 1912 there were 13, at times up to 16, so significantly more than today with five. In Communications from the German Dendrological Society of 1912, August Siebert wrote:

The place where the oak stands doesn't have a special name. The oak itself is said to have been given the name "Royal Oak" because King Ludwig liked to linger under it. With a trunk circumference of 5.70 m—measured 150cm above the earth—the most recent measurement showed a height of 32m, the longest horizontally grown branch, i.e. the radius of the crown, showed 22m. Thirteen support pillars were necessary to support the heavy lower branches. [...] Mr. Königl. Forestry Council Unselt, one of the oldest foresters in the area, estimates the age of the oak at 1200–1300 years, even taking into account the unfavourable growth conditions in earlier years; but he is convinced that the tree can get 120–150 years older with the care given to it. It is also of interest that the oak is hung with fruit almost every year, this year it is even very rich.

— August Siebert, Communications from the German Dendrological Society (1912), English translation

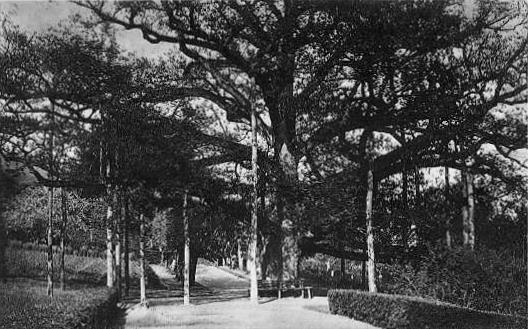
Royal oak with 16 supports, shortly after 1900

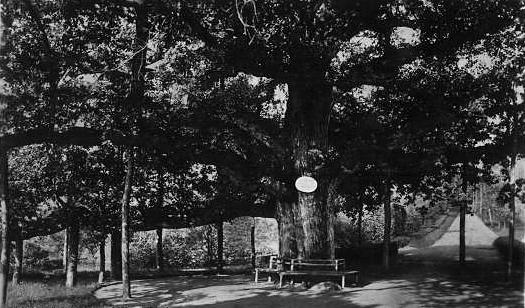
Royal oak from the east, shortly after 1900

=== In recent times ===
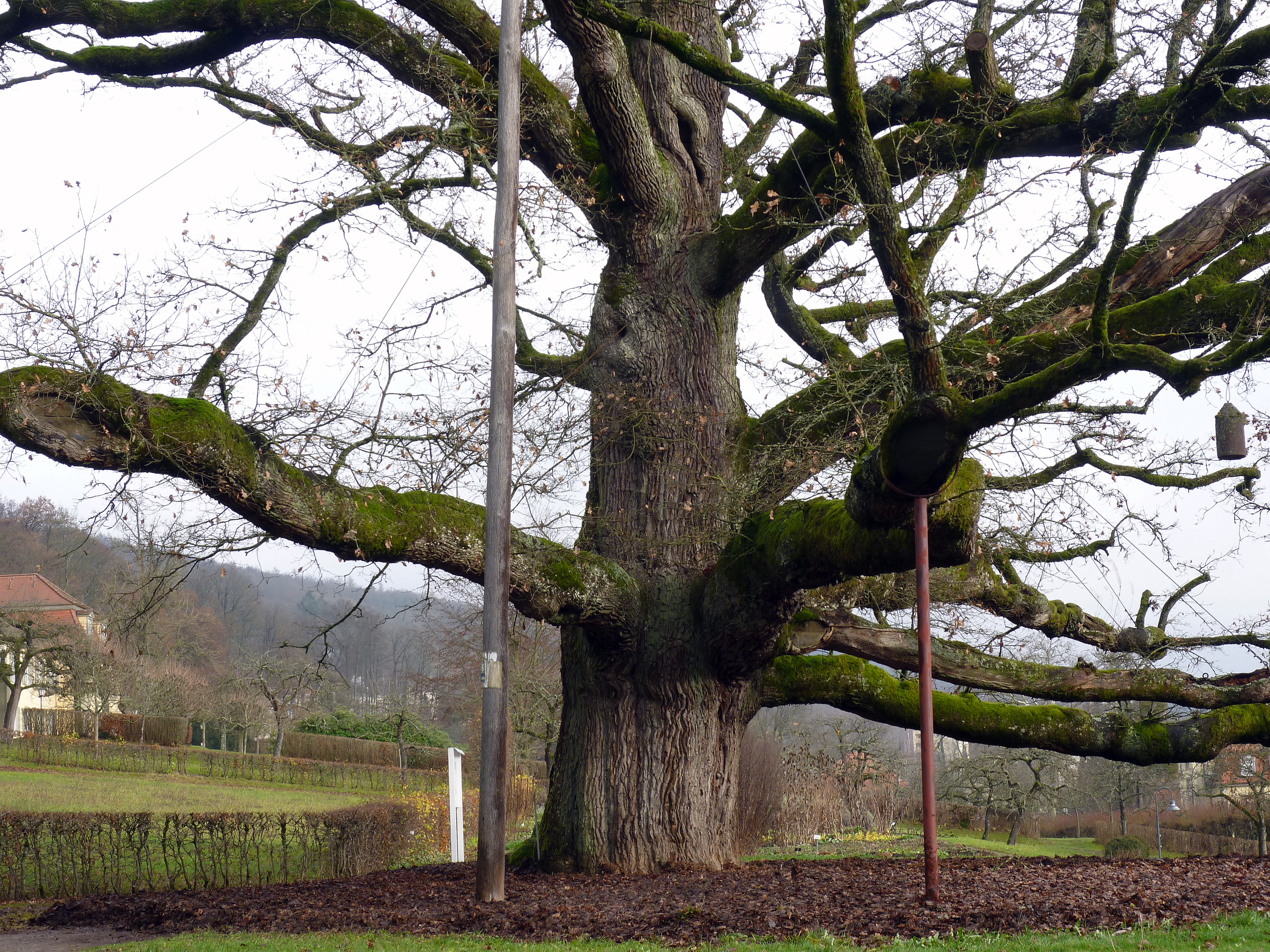
Branches running horizontally with supports

In Schneider's Rhönführer from 1928:

A foliage vault formed by the interweaving of 16 linden trees leads from the castle garden to the royal oak, which may be over 1000 years old and through long, horizontally stretched branches a distance of approx. 30 m in the west diameter covered.

In the last 50 years, tree care measures have been carried out several times on the oak. The rotten and fungus-infested wood was removed from the hollow trunk. Then it was dexelled, the rest smoothed and the surface treated with fungicidal agents. To stabilize the trunk, several intersecting threaded rods with over-pipes were attached in the cavity. The crown came with a crown lock provided, branches were shortened and trimmed, and wound closure agents were applied to cut surfaces. Three of the wooden supports were replaced by iron bars with which the branches are connected by threaded bars with open arches. A bench around the trunk from the 19th century was removed to prevent further soil compaction in the root area.

In 1996, the tree was renovated and a decrease in vitality and a high proportion of dead wood were found. A specialist company carried out crown maintenance, renewed the supports, and installed a new support. Old wounds and rotten areas were checked and the anchorages of the holding ropes checked. At the same time, the soil type was determined and a nutrient analysis was carried out. A residual wall thickness measurement was carried out on a hollow, thick branch. The oak suffered greatly from the hot (the warmest temperatures in at least 250 years) and partly dry summer of 2003. The branches' vitality, which had been good up to that point, has continued to decline. Several branches died in the outer crown area. This is probably because of the lowering of the groundwater level and the resulting water shortage. To counteract decay, the tree disc is now fertilized annually with a soil activator to create more favorable conditions for the roots via the soil structure. In dry periods, the oak is watered as much as is necessary. Dead branches were removed in the winter of 2005/2006, the crown was trimmed, and the security of its limbs checked.

In the spring of 2006, the state spa's nursery planted special medicinal mushrooms (Mycorrhiza) in the root area. Since 2008, the soil in the crown area has been covered with a layer of leaves in autumn. These remain there all year round to prevent the upper soil layers from drying out. Because of the continuing decline in the tree's vitality, further maintenance measures were carried out by a specialist company in spring 2009. Dead branches were again removed and the steel cable connections checked. In addition, the crown was secured using the BOA system. With this newer form of branch securing, the laterally protruding branches were tied to one or more main branches using rope connections that end in loops, so that the load is distributed within the tree. In September 2012, ten new steel supports were installed. Two of the previous wooden supports remain. Of the ten new supports made from roughly eight-centimetre (3.1 in) thick round tubes, seven are designed as A-supports that can also absorb lateral forces. The branches are attached to the supports with straps, the contact surface of which is coated with rubber. Gaps in the rubber allow the water to drain off better. Some of the supports have a threaded section and can be readjusted. The pillars are embedded in concrete foundations 20 centimetres (7.9 in) deep.
