= Beer riots in Bavaria =

1844 riots against the beer tax in Bavaria

The beer riots in Bavaria happened between 1 May and 5 May 1844, beginning after King Ludwig I decreed a tax on beer. Crowds of urban workers beat up police while the Bavarian army showed reluctance to get involved. Civil order was restored only after the King decreed a ten percent reduction in the price of beer. Following the Revolutions of 1848, Ludwig I abdicated in favour of his son, Maximilian II.

== Background ==
In the mid-19th century, beer was an essential part of daily life in Bavaria, particularly for the working class, who consumed it as a cheap and nutritious beverage. At the time, the price of beer was regulated by the government to ensure it remained affordable. However, due to rising grain prices and other economic pressures, Bavaria brewers sought permission to raise beer prices.

King Ludwig I, who was already unpopular due to his extravagant spending and the influence of his mistress, Lola Montez, approved the price increase in May 1844. This decision was seen as a direct affront to the working class, who relied on cheap beer as a basic necessity. The new price was set at 6.5 kreuzers per Mass (a traditional Bavarian beer measure, roughly equivalent to one liter), up from the previous 5 kreuzers.

== Riots ==
The price increase sparked immediate outrage among the population. On May 1, 1844, a large crowd of Munich residents, primarily composed of workers and artisans, gathered to protest the new beer prices. The protests quickly escalated into riots, with demonstrators smashing beer barrels, looting taverns, and attacking the properties of brewers who had supported the price hike.

The unrest spread rapidly throughout the city, and the authorities struggled to contain the situation. Over the course of several days, the rioters clashed with the police and the military, resulting in significant property damage and a number of injuries.

=== Suppression ===
Faced with widespread disorder and fearing further escalation, King Ludwig I was forced to back down. On May 5, 1844, the government announced that the beer price increase would be reversed, restoring the price to 5 kreuzers per Mass. This concession ended the riots, and order was gradually restored in Munich.

== Aftermath ==
The Beer Riots of 1844 left a lasting impact on Bavarian society and politics. Ludwig I's already waning popularity suffered further as a result of his handling of the crisis, and his reputation never fully recovered. The events of 1844 also contributed to the growing revolutionary sentiments that would culminate in the Revolutions of 1848, which swept across Europe, including the German states.

== Legacy ==
The riots are remembered today as an example of popular resistance to economic injustice and as a reflection of the deep cultural significance of beer in Bavarian life. The Beer Riots of 1844 remain a notable episode in the history of Munich and Bavaria, illustrating the intersection of economic, cultural, and political forces in 19th-century Germany.

== See also ==
- Beer riots in Chicago: the Lager Beer Riot
